= 1970 Crossmaglen bombing =

1970 IRA attack in Northern Ireland

- Part of the Troubles
- Location: 54°7′55.72″N 6°34′57.10″W; Crossmaglen, County Armagh, Northern Ireland
- Date: 11 August 1970; 12:30 a.m.
- Target: Royal Ulster Constabulary personnel
- Attack type: Booby-trap bomb
- Deaths: 2 RUC officers
- Perpetrator: IRA (South Armagh Brigade)

On 11 August 1970, two Royal Ulster Constabulary (RUC) officers were killed by a booby-trap bomb planted under a car by the Provisional Irish Republican Army (IRA) near Crossmaglen, in County Armagh, Northern Ireland. They were the first RUC officers to be killed by republicans during the Troubles and the first security forces to be killed in South Armagh, an IRA stronghold for much of the conflict.

== Background ==
The conflict known as Troubles had started a year earlier in August 1969 with the Battle of the Bogside followed by the August 1969 riots. The first RUC officer to be killed in the conflict was Victor Arbuckle (29). He was shot dead by members of the Ulster Volunteer Force (UVF) on 12 October 1969, during street violence in the Shankill area of Belfast. The loyalists "had taken to the streets in protest at the Hunt Report, which recommended the disbandment of the B Specials and disarming of the RUC".

== The bombing ==
On the evening of 11 August, two RUC officers based in Crossmaglen—Samuel Donaldson (23) and Robert Millar (26)—went to investigate a red Ford Cortina abandoned on the Lissaraw Road near the village. Unknown to the officers, the car contained a booby-trap bomb, made up of 20 lb (9.1 kg) of gelignite. It exploded when one of the officers attempted to open one of the car doors, badly wounding them and blowing them over a hedge. The blast was heard from Crossmaglen RUC station. The officers died of their wounds the next day. They were the first members of the security forces to be killed by republicans during the conflict. The car had been stolen outside the Ardmore Hotel in Newry on 7 August. The action was planned and executed by an active service unit made up of IRA members from Navan, County Meath and Inniskeen, County Monaghan, both in the Republic of Ireland. The group was led by high-profile republican Seán Mac Stíofáin.

== Aftermath ==
The next killing of a member of the British security forces was in February 1971, when the IRA shot dead Gunner Robert Curtis in Belfast. Curtis was the first British soldier to be killed in the Troubles.

Crossmaglen would become an Irish republican stronghold and the Provisional IRA carried out many attacks on the British security forces there during the course of the conflict.

The bombing was part of a wider campaign of violence by the IRA during the Troubles, and was widely condemned by politicians on both sides of the Irish Sea.

== See also ==
- Drummuckavall Ambush
- South Armagh Sniper
- Glasdrumman ambush
- Operation Conservation
- Attack on Cloghogue checkpoint
