= Military Reaction Force =

British Army counter-insurgency force

- Active: Mid-1971 – early 1973
- Country: United Kingdom
- Branch: British Army
- Role: Counterinsurgency; Special reconnaissance Clandestine human intelligence
- Size: 40
- Part of: 39th Infantry Brigade
- Headquarters: Palace Barracks, Northern Ireland
- Engagements: Operation Banner (The Troubles)

Commanders
- Commander: Cpt. James McGregor (June 1972 onward)
- Commander: Cpt. Arthur Watchus (until June 1972)

The Military Reaction Force, Military Reconnaissance Force or Mobile Reconnaissance Force (MRF) was a covert intelligence-gathering and counterinsurgency unit of the British Army active in Northern Ireland during the Troubles. The unit was formed during the summer of 1971 and operated until late 1972 or early 1973. MRF teams operated in plain clothes and civilian vehicles, equipped with pistols and submachine guns. They were tasked with tracking and arresting or killing members of the Provisional Irish Republican Army (IRA). It is alleged that the MRF killed a number of Catholic civilians in drive-by shootings.

The MRF also handled informers within the paramilitary groups and ran several front companies to gather intelligence. In October 1972, the IRA uncovered and attacked two of the MRF's front companies—a mobile laundry service and a massage parlour—which contributed to the unit's dissolution. The MRF was succeeded by the Special Reconnaissance Unit (SRU; or 14 Intelligence Company) and, later, by the Force Research Unit (FRU).

== Origins and structure ==
The MRF was established in the summer of 1971. It appears to have its origins in ideas and techniques developed by Brigadier Sir Frank Kitson, a senior commander in the British Army, who had created "counter gangs" to defeat the Kenya Land and Freedom Army in the Colony and Protectorate of Kenya during the Mau Mau rebellion. He was the author of two books on counter-insurgency tactics: Gangs & Counter Gangs (1960) and Low Intensity Operations (1971). From 1970 to 1972, Kitson served in Northern Ireland as commander of the 39th Infantry Brigade. It has been claimed that he was responsible for establishing the MRF and that the unit was attached to his brigade.

The MRF was based at Palace Barracks in the Belfast suburb of Holywood. The MRF's first commander was Captain Arthur Watchus. In June 1972, he was succeeded as commander by Captain James 'Hamish' McGregor. The unit consisted of up to 40 men, handpicked from throughout the British Army. A Ministry of Defence review concluded the MRF had "no provision for detailed command and control".

== Modus operandi ==
In March 1994, the UK's Junior Defence Minister Jeremy Hanley issued the following description of the MRF in reply to a parliamentary written question: "The MRF was a small military unit which, during the period 1971 to 1973, was responsible for carrying out surveillance tasks in Northern Ireland in those circumstances where soldiers in uniform and with Army vehicles would be too easily recognized".

Martin Dillon described the MRF's purpose as being "to draw the Provisional IRA into a shooting war with loyalists in order to distract the IRA from its objective of attacking the Army".

Many details about the unit's modus operandi have been revealed by former members. One issued a statement to the Troops Out Movement in July 1978. In 2012–13, a former MRF member using the covername 'Simon Cursey' gave a number of interviews and published the book MRF Shadow Troop about his time in the unit. In November 2013, a BBC Panorama documentary was aired about the MRF. It drew on information from seven former members, as well as a number of other sources. The Panorama documentary identified 10 unarmed civilians who were shot by the MRF (the MRF was disbanded in 1973).

The MRF had both a "defensive" surveillance role and an "offensive" role. MRF operatives patrolled the streets in these cars in teams of two to four, tracking down and arresting or killing suspected IRA members. They were armed with Browning pistols and Sterling sub-machine guns. Former MRF members admitted that the unit shot unarmed people without warning, both IRA members and civilians. Former MRF members claim they had a list of targets they were ordered to "shoot on sight". One member interviewed for the BBC's Panorama, Soldier F, said "We were not there to act like an army unit, we were there to act like a terror group". Soldier H said "We operated initially with them thinking that we were the UVF", to which Soldier F added: "We wanted to cause confusion". Another said that their role was "to draw out the IRA and to minimise their activities". They said they fired on groups of people manning defensive barricades, on the assumption that some might be armed. The MRF member who made a statement in 1978 opined that the unit's role was one of "repression through fear, terror and violence". He said that the unit had been trained to use weapons favoured by the IRA.

Republicans argued that the MRF deliberately attacked civilians for two main reasons: firstly, to draw the IRA into a sectarian conflict with loyalists and divert it from its campaign against the state; and secondly, to show Catholics that the IRA could not protect them, thus draining its support.

The MRF's surveillance operations included the use of front companies (see below) and disguises. Former members claim they posed as road sweepers, dustmen and even homeless meths-drinkers while carrying out surveillance. The MRF is known to have used agents referred to as 'Freds'. These were republican or loyalist paramilitaries who were recruited by the Intelligence Corps. The Freds would work inside paramilitary groups, feeding back information to the MRF. They were also ferried through Belfast in armoured cars, and through the gunslit would point-out paramilitary individuals of note. Through this method the MRF compiled extensive photographs and dossiers of Belfast militants of both factions.

== Alleged attacks on civilians ==
In 1972, it is alleged MRF teams carried out a number of drive-by shootings in Catholic and Irish nationalist areas of Belfast, some of which were attributed to Ulster loyalist paramilitaries. MRF members have asserted the unit's involvement in most of these attacks. There are also allegations that the unit helped loyalists to carry out attacks.

=== McGurk's Bar bombing ===
On 4 December 1971, the loyalist Ulster Volunteer Force (UVF) detonated a time bomb at the door of McGurk's public house, located on the corner of North Queen Street and Great George's Street in Belfast. The pub was frequented by Irish Catholics/nationalists. The explosion caused the building to collapse, killing fifteen Catholic civilians, including 2 children, and wounding seventeen more. It was the deadliest attack in Belfast during the Troubles. The book Killing For Britain (2009), written by former UVF member 'John Black', claims that the MRF organised the bombing and helped the bombers get in and out of the area. Two days before the bombing, republican prisoners had escaped from nearby Crumlin Road Prison. Security was tightened, and there were many checkpoints in the area at the time. However, locals claimed that the security forces helped the bombers by removing the checkpoints an hour before the attack. One of the bombers—Robert Campbell—said that their original target had been The Gem, a nearby pub that was allegedly linked to the Official IRA. It is claimed the MRF plan was to help the UVF bomb The Gem, and then blame the bombing on the Provisional IRA. This would start a feud between the two IRA factions, diverting them from their fight against the security forces and draining their support. Campbell said that The Gem had security outside and, after waiting for almost an hour, they decided to bomb the nearest 'Catholic pub' instead. Immediately afterward, the security forces claimed that a bomb had accidentally exploded while being handled by IRA members inside McGurk's.

=== Whiterock Road shooting ===
On 15 April 1972, brothers Gerry and John Conway—both Catholic civilians—were walking along Whiterock Road to catch a bus. As they passed St Thomas's School, a car stopped, and three men leapt out and began shooting at them with pistols. The brothers ran, but both were shot and wounded. Witnesses said one of the gunmen returned to the car and spoke into a handset radio. Shortly afterward two armoured personnel carriers arrived, and there was a conversation between the uniformed and the plainclothes soldiers. The three vehicles then left, and the brothers were taken by ambulance to the Royal Victoria Hospital. The British Army told journalists that an army patrol had encountered two wanted men, that one had fired at the patrol, and that the patrol returned fire. In a 1978 interview, a former MRF member claimed he had been one of the gunmen. He confirmed that the brothers were unarmed but claimed his patrol had mistaken the brothers for two IRA men whom the MRF were ordered to "shoot on sight".

=== Andersonstown shootings ===
On 12 May 1972, the British government announced there would be no disciplinary action against the soldiers involved in Bloody Sunday. That night, MRF personnel shot seven Catholic civilians in the Andersonstown area.

An MRF team in an unmarked car approached a checkpoint manned by members of the Catholic Ex-Servicemen's Association (CESA) at the entrance to Riverdale Park South. The CESA was an unarmed vigilante organization set up by former members of the British Army to protect Catholic areas. The car stopped, and then reversed. One of the MRF men opened fire from the car with a sub-machine gun, killing Catholic civilian Patrick McVeigh (44) and wounding four others. The car continued on, turned, and then drove past the scene of the shooting. All of the men were local residents and McVeigh, who was shot through the back, had stopped to chat to the CESA members as he walked home. He was a married father of six children. The British Army told journalists that gunmen in a passing car had fired indiscriminately at civilians and called it an "apparently motiveless crime". The car had come from a Protestant area and had returned the same way. This, together with the spokesman's statement, implied that loyalists were responsible.

An inquest into the attack was held in December 1972, where it was admitted that the car's occupants were soldiers belonging to an undercover unit known as the MRF. The soldiers did not appear at the inquest but issued statements to it, claiming they had been shot at by six gunmen and were returning fire. However, eyewitnesses said none of the CESA members were armed, and this was supported by forensic evidence. The MRF members involved were never prosecuted. There is no evidence that any of their targets were in the IRA. An MRF member stated in 1978 that their intention was to make it look like a loyalist attack, thus provoking sectarian conflict and "taking the heat off the Army".

Minutes before the shooting at the checkpoint, two other Catholic civilians had been shot nearby by another MRF team. The two young men—Aidan McAloon and Eugene Devlin—had taken a taxi home from a disco and were dropped off at Slievegallion Drive. As they began walking along the street, in the direction of a vigilante barricade, the MRF team opened fire on them from an unmarked car. The MRF team told the Royal Military Police that they had shot a man who was firing a rifle. Witnesses said there was no gunman on the street, and police forensics experts found no evidence that McAloon or Devlin had fired weapons.

Two weeks later, on 27 May, Catholic civilian Gerard Duddy (20) was killed in a drive-by shooting at the same spot where Patrick McVeigh was killed. His death was blamed on loyalists.

=== Killing of Jean Smith ===
On the night of 9 June 1972, Catholic civilian Jean Smith (or Smyth) was shot dead on the Glen Road. Jean was a 24-year-old mother of one. She was shot while sitting in the passenger seat of a car at the Glen Road bus terminus. As her male companion turned the car, he heard what he thought was a tyre bursting. When he got out to check, the car was hit by a burst of automatic gunfire. Smith was shot in the head and died shortly afterward. Her companion stopped a passing taxi and asked the driver to take her to hospital. However, the taxi was then stopped by police and diverted to Andersonstown RUC base, where they were held for several hours.

The security forces blamed the killing on the IRA. In October 1973, however, the Belfast Telegraph published an article suggesting that Smith could have been shot by the MRF. Documents uncovered from the British National Archives reveal that the MRF fired shots in the area that night. They claim to have fired at two gunmen and hit one of them. The Belfast Telegraph article also suggested that Smith could have been shot by the IRA, who fired on the car thinking it was carrying MRF members. The IRA deny this and claim that it was not in the area at the time of the shooting.

=== Glen Road shooting ===
On 22 June 1972, the Provisional IRA announced that it would begin a ceasefire in four days, as a prelude to secret talks with the British government. That afternoon, MRF members in an unmarked car shot and wounded three Catholic men standing by a car at Glen Road bus terminus. A man in a nearby house was also wounded by the gunfire. Shortly afterward, the MRF unit's car was stopped by the Royal Ulster Constabulary (RUC) and the occupants were arrested. Inside the car was a Thompson sub-machine gun, "for years the IRA's favourite weapon". One of the MRF members—Clive Graham Williams—was charged with attempted murder. He told the court that two of the men had been armed, and one had fired at the MRF car. He claimed he was returning fire. Witnesses said that none of the civilians were armed, and that it was an unprovoked attack. Police forensics experts found no evidence that the civilians had fired weapons. However, key witnesses were not called to give evidence in person, and Williams was acquitted on 26 June 1973. He was later promoted and awarded the Military Medal for bravery.

=== St James's Crescent shooting ===
On the night of 27 September 1972, the MRF shot dead Catholic civilian Daniel Rooney and wounded his friend Brendan Brennan. They were shot from a passing car while standing on a street corner at St James's Crescent, in the Falls district. British Army told journalists that the two men fired at an undercover Army patrol and that the patrol returned fire. They also claimed that the two men were IRA members. The IRA, the men's families, and residents of the area denied this, and Rooney's name has never appeared on a republican roll of honour. An inquest was held in December 1973. The court was told that forensic tests on the men's hands and clothing found no firearms residue. The six soldiers involved repeated the British Army's claim, but they did not appear at the inquest. Their statements were read by a police officer and they were referred to by initials.

=== New Lodge Six ===
There are also allegations that the MRF was involved in a drive-by shooting in the Catholic New Lodge area on 3 February 1973. The car's occupants opened fire on a group of young people standing outside a pub on Antrim Road, killing IRA members James Sloan and James McCann and wounding others. The gunmen drove on and allegedly fired at another group of people outside a takeaway. In the hours that followed, a further four people—an IRA member and three civilians—were shot dead in the area by British snipers. The dead became known as the "New Lodge Six".

In June 1973, the Northern Ireland Civil Rights Association issued advice on how to behave in the event of being "shot by MRF/SAS squads", saying for example that people should "pretend to be dead until the squad moves away".

== Front companies ==
The MRF ran a number of front companies in Belfast during the early 1970s. They included Four Square Laundry (a mobile laundry service operating in nationalist West Belfast) and the Gemini massage parlour on Antrim Road. The MRF also had an office at College Square. All were set up to gather intelligence on the Provisional Irish Republican Army (IRA) and Irish nationalist movement.

A Four Square van visited houses in nationalist West Belfast twice a week to collect and deliver laundry. One "employee" (a young man) drove the van while another (a young woman) collected and delivered the laundry. Both were from Northern Ireland. Four Square initially gathered customers by offering "discount vouchers", which were numbered and colour-coded by street. Clothes collected for washing were first forensically checked for traces of explosives, as well as blood or firearms residue. They were also compared to previous laundry loads from the same house—the sudden presence of different-sized clothes could indicate that the house was harbouring an IRA member. Surveillance operatives and equipment were hidden in the back of the van or in a compartment in the roof. Further intelligence was gathered by staff observing and "chatting" to locals whilst collecting their laundry.

However, in September 1972, the IRA found that two of its members—Seamus Wright and Kevin McKee—were working for the MRF as double agents. Under interrogation, McKee told the IRA about the MRF's operations, including the laundry and the massage parlour. The leaders of the Provisional IRA Belfast Brigade ordered that the companies immediately be put under surveillance. This surveillance confirmed that McKee's information was correct. The IRA later took Wright and McKee to South Armagh, where they were "executed" as spies. Their bodies were recovered in 2015.

=== October 1972 attacks ===
Following these revelations, the leaders of the IRA's Belfast Brigade planned an operation against the MRF, which was to take place on 2 October 1972. The 2nd Battalion would attack the Four Square Laundry van and the office at College Square, while the 3rd Battalion would raid the massage parlour. At about 11:20AM on 2 October, IRA volunteers ambushed the Four Square Laundry van in the nationalist Twinbrook area of West Belfast. Four volunteers were involved: one drove the car while three others did the shooting. They shot dead the driver, an undercover British soldier of the Royal Engineers, and machine-gunned the roof compartment where undercover operatives were thought to be hiding. The other Four Square employee—a female soldier from the Women's Royal Army Corps (WRAC)—was collecting and delivering laundry from a nearby house at the time. The residents, who thought that loyalists were attacking the van, took her into the house and kept her safe. The woman was later secretly invested at Buckingham Palace with an MBE.

About an hour later, the same IRA unit raided College Square but found nobody there. Meanwhile, a unit of the 3rd Battalion made for the room above the massage parlour, which they believed was being used to gather intelligence. They claimed to have shot three undercover soldiers: two men and a woman. According to some sources, the IRA claimed to have killed two surveillance officers allegedly hidden in the laundry van, and two MRF members at the massage parlour. However, the British Army only confirmed the death of the van driver on that day. Brendan Hughes said that the operation "was a great morale booster for the IRA and for the people that were involved".

The MRF, realising its undercover operations were blown, disbanded the units and was itself disbanded shortly afterwards. The incident was believed to have prompted the establishment of a new undercover intelligence unit: the 14 Intelligence Company (also known as "The Det").

== See also ==
- 14 Intelligence Company
- '71 (film)
- Drummuckavall ambush
- Force Research Unit
- Glasdrumman ambush
- Glenanne gang
- Operation Conservation
- Special Reconnaissance Unit
