= Attack on Derryard checkpoint =

1989 Provisional IRA attack in Northern Ireland

Attack on Derryard PVC
- Part of the Troubles and Operation Banner
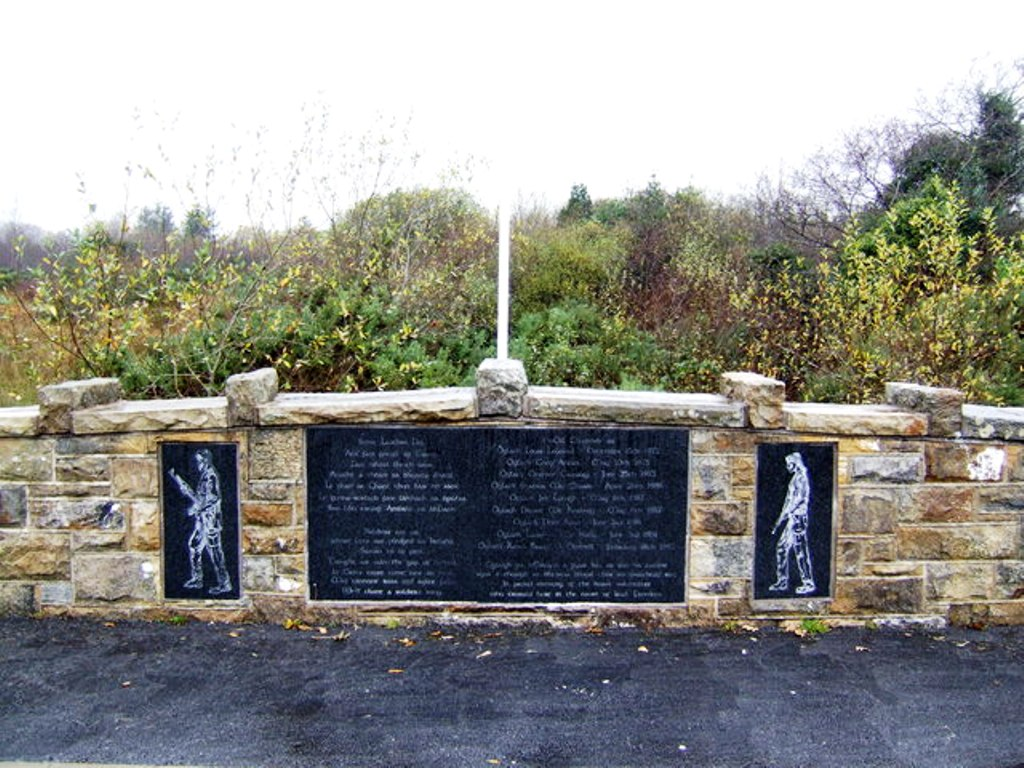
- Republican memorial at Carragunt bridge, on the border between Northern Ireland and the Republic, often crossed by Provisional IRA forces during the Troubles to attack British targets inside County Fermanagh
| Date | 13 December 1989 |
| Location | Derryard, near Rosslea, County Fermanagh 54°15′27.9″N 7°10′58.4″W |
| Result | British Army complex stormed IRA bombing attempt failed |

Belligerents
| Provisional IRA | United Kingdom • British Army • RUC |

Commanders and leaders
| Thomas Murphy; Michael Ryan | Corporal Robert Duncan |

Strength
| 1 Improvised armoured vehicle 11 in attacking unit 9 providing tactical support | 9 in the complex 4 on nearby patrol 1 helicopter |

Casualties and losses
| None | 2 killed 2 wounded |
- Location within Northern Ireland

On 13 December 1989 the Provisional Irish Republican Army (IRA) attacked a British Army permanent vehicle checkpoint complex manned by the King's Own Scottish Borderers (KOSB) near the Northern Ireland–Republic of Ireland border at Derryard townland, a few miles north of Rosslea, County Fermanagh. The IRA unit, firing from the back of an armoured dump truck, attacked the small base with heavy machine-guns, hand grenades, anti-tank rockets and a flamethrower. A nearby Army patrol arrived at the scene and a fierce firefight erupted. The IRA withdrew after leaving a van bomb inside the complex, but the device did not fully detonate. The assault on the outpost left two soldiers dead and two wounded.

== Planning ==
According to journalist Ed Moloney, the IRA Army Council, suspecting a great deal of infiltration by double agents at the grassroots level of the IRA, decided to form an experimental flying column (instead of the usual active service unit) to mount a large-scale operation against a permanent vehicle checkpoint along the border. It hoped that this would prevent any information leak that could result in another fiasco like the Loughgall Ambush of 1987.

Moloney maintains that the planning was in the charge of Thomas Murphy, alleged leader of the South Armagh Brigade, and that the raid was to be led by East Tyrone Brigade member Michael "Pete" Ryan. Journalist Ian Bruce instead claims that the IRA unit was led by an Irish citizen who had served in the Parachute Regiment, citing intelligence sources. The column was made up of about 20 experienced IRA volunteers from throughout Northern Ireland, 11 of whom would carry out the attack itself. Bruce reported that IRA members from County Monaghan, supported by local Fermanagh militants, carried out the raid.

== Attack ==
The target was a permanent vehicle checkpoint at Derryard. Described as a "mini base", it included an accommodation block and defensive sangars. It was manned by eight soldiers of the 1st Battalion, King's Own Scottish Borderers and a Royal Ulster Constabulary (RUC) officer. The 11 IRA members would be driven to the checkpoint in the back of a makeshift Bedford armoured dumper truck. They were armed with 7.62mm AK-47s, 5.56mm Armalite AR-18s, two 12.7mm DShK heavy machine-guns, RPG-7s, different kinds of grenades, and a LPO-50 flamethrower. The heavy machine guns and the flamethrower were mounted on a tripod on the lorry bed. To assure widespread destruction, the column would detonate a van bomb after the initial assault.

The attack took place shortly after 4 p.m. IRA members sealed off roads leading to the checkpoint in an attempt to prevent civilians from getting caught up in the attack. The truck was driven from the border and halted at the checkpoint. As Private James Houston began to check the back of the truck, the IRA opened fire with assault rifles and threw grenades into the compound. Two RPG-7s were fired at the observation sangar while the flamethrower stream was directed at the command sangar. Heavy shooting continued as the truck reversed and smashed through the gates of the compound. At least three IRA volunteers dismounted inside the checkpoint and sprayed the portacabins with gunfire and the flamethrower's fire stream, while throwing grenades and nail bombs. The defenders were forced to seek shelter in sangars, from where they fired into their own base. A farmer some distance away saw an orange ball of flames and heard gunfire 'raking the fields'. As the truck drove out of the now wrecked compound, a red transit van loaded with a 400 lb (182 kg) bomb was driven inside and set to detonate once the IRA unit had made its escape. However, only the booster charge exploded.

The attack was finally repulsed by a four-men Borderers section from the checkpoint that was patrolling nearby, with the support of a Wessex helicopter. The patrol fired more than 100 rounds at the IRA unit. The Wessex received gunfire, and was forced to take evasive action. The IRA column, at risk of being surrounded, broke toward the border in the armoured truck. It was found abandoned at the border with a 460-pound (210 kg) bomb on board.

Two soldiers were killed in the attack: Private James Houston (22) from England and Lance-Corporal Michael Patterson (21) from Scotland. Corporal Whitelaw was badly wounded by shrapnel and later airlifted for treatment. Another soldier suffered minor injuries.

== Aftermath ==
There was outrage in Westminster and among unionists, as a supposedly well-defended border post had been overrun by the IRA and two soldiers killed. On the other hand, according to Moloney, there was also some disappointment among republicans. Despite the positive propaganda effect, the quick and strong reaction from the outpost's defenders convinced some high-ranking IRA members that the Army Council had been infiltrated by a mole.

A senior British military officer, when quizzed about the IRA attack, said:

They are murdering bastards, but they are not cowards. This team actually pressed home a ground attack right into the heart of the compound. That takes guts when there are people firing back.

KOSB officers and security sources believed that the IRA unit involved was not locally recruited, putting the blame instead on IRA members from Clogher (County Tyrone) and South Monaghan (in the Republic). The same sources said that the attack was executed "in true backside-or-bust Para style".

Major Bob Andrew, the KOSB garrison commander at Cookstown, went on to say:

The Provos in Belfast or Londonderry tend to stage incidents timed to catch the six o'clock news. The people down here are out to inflict casualties on us. They are a harder breed entirely, and very, very dangerous. This has always been a committed Republican area. The cowboy element was caught or shot years ago. What we have now is an experienced, professional enemy with enormous local support. They should never be underestimated. That can be fatal. Last year, they mortared the unit in our base at 10 minutes to midnight on Hogmanay, hoping to catch them off-guard. That's a measure of their calculating approach.

After the action of Derryard, the British Army in Northern Ireland were issued the French designed Luchaire 40mm rifle grenade, fitted on the muzzle of the SA80 rifle. This gave the troops a lightweight armour piercing capability to deal with the threat imposed by improvised armoured vehicles. Permanent checkpoints along the border were also fitted with GPMG machine guns. From 1990 until the end of the IRA campaign in 1997, there were a number of further bloodless, small-scale attacks against permanent vehicle checkpoints along this part of the border using automatic weapons and improvised mortars, particularly in County Fermanagh and against a military outpost at Aughnacloy, County Tyrone.

Two soldiers, Corporal Robert Duncan and Lance Corporal Ian Harvey, were bestowed the Distinguished Conduct Medal (DCM), whilst Lance-Corporal Patterson received a posthumous mention in dispatches for his actions during the attack. The checkpoint at Derryard was dismantled, along others in the area, in March 1991, as part of a major border security re-arrangement codenamed Operation Mutilate.

== See also ==
- 1990 British Army Gazelle shootdown
- Attack on Cloghoge checkpoint
- Drummuckavall ambush
- Glasdrumman ambush
- Operation Conservation
- 1993 Fivemiletown ambush
- Improvised tactical vehicles of the Provisional IRA
- List of attacks on British aircraft during The Troubles
