= Provisional Irish Republican Army campaign =

Effort to end UK control of Northern Ireland (1969–1997)

Provisional IRA campaign
- Part of the Troubles
- IRA members showing an improvised mortar and an RPG (1992)
Date	1969–1997
Location	Primarily Northern Ireland and England but also launched attacks against British targets in West Germany, Belgium and the Netherlands.
Result	Military stalemate Ceasefire

Belligerents
Provisional Irish Republican Army (IRA): South Armagh Brigade; East Tyrone Brigade; Belfast Brigade; Derry Brigade	(United Kingdom) British Armed Forces; Royal Ulster Constabulary; (RUC)	Ulster Defence Association (UDA); Ulster Volunteer Force; (UVF); Loyalist Volunteer Force (LVF); Red Hand Commando (RHC); Other loyalist paramilitary groups

Casualties and losses
IRA 293 killed over 10,000 imprisoned at different times during the conflict	British Armed Forces 643–697 killed RUC 270–273 killed	Loyalist paramilitary groups 28–39 killed
- Others killed by IRA; 508–644 civilians 1 Irish Army soldier 6 Gardaí; 5 other republican paramilitaries

From 1969 until 1997, the Provisional Irish Republican Army (IRA) conducted an armed paramilitary campaign primarily in Northern Ireland and England, aimed at ending British rule in Northern Ireland in order to create a united Ireland.

The Provisional IRA emerged from a split in the Irish Republican Army in 1969, partly as a result of that organisation's perceived failure to defend Catholic neighbourhoods from attack in the 1969 Northern Ireland riots. The Provisionals gained credibility from their efforts to physically defend such areas in 1970 and 1971. From 1971 to 1972, the IRA took to the offensive and conducted a relatively high-intensity campaign against the British and Northern Ireland security forces and the infrastructure of the state. The British Army characterised this period as the "insurgency phase" of the IRA's campaign.

The IRA declared a brief ceasefire in 1972 and a more protracted one in 1975, when there was an internal debate over the feasibility of future operations. The armed group reorganised itself in the late 1970s into a smaller, cell-based structure, which was designed to be harder to penetrate. The IRA then carried out a smaller scale but more sustained campaign, which they characterised as the 'Long War', with the eventual aim of weakening the British government's resolve to remain in Ireland. The British Army called this the "terrorist phase" of the IRA's campaign.

The IRA made attempts in the 1980s to escalate the conflict with the aid of weapons donated by Libya. In the 1990s they also resumed a campaign of bombing economic targets in London and other cities in England.

On 31 August 1994, the IRA called a unilateral ceasefire with the aim of having their associated political party, Sinn Féin, admitted into the Northern Ireland peace process. The organisation ended its ceasefire in February 1996 but declared another in July 1997. The IRA accepted the terms of the Good Friday Agreement in 1998 as a negotiated end to the Northern Ireland conflict. In 2005 the organisation declared a formal end to its campaign and had its weaponry decommissioned under international supervision.

== Beginnings ==
In the early days of the Troubles (1969–72), the Provisional IRA was poorly armed, with only a handful of old weapons left over from the IRA's Border campaign of 1956–1962. The IRA had split in December 1969 into the Provisional IRA and Official IRA factions. In the first two years of the conflict, the Provisionals' main activities were defending Irish nationalist areas from attacks by loyalist paramilitaries.

In contrast to the IRA's relative inaction during the 1969 Northern Ireland riots, in the summer of 1970, the Provisional IRA mounted determined armed defences of the nationalist areas of Belfast against loyalist attackers, killing a number of Protestant civilians and loyalists in the process. On 27 June 1970, the IRA killed five Protestant civilians during street disturbances in Belfast. Three more were shot in Ardoyne in north Belfast after gun battles broke out during an Orange Order parade. When loyalists retaliated by attacking the nationalist enclave of Short Strand in east Belfast, Billy McKee, the Provisionals' commander in Belfast, occupied St Matthew's Church and defended it in a five-hour gun battle with the loyalists, in what became known as the Battle of St Matthew's. One of his men was killed, he was badly wounded, and three loyalists were also killed. The Provisional IRA gained much of its support from these activities, as they were widely perceived among nationalists as being defenders of nationalist and Irish Catholic people against aggression.

Initially, the British Army, deployed into Northern Ireland in August 1969 to reinforce the Royal Ulster Constabulary (RUC) and restore government control, was welcomed in Catholic nationalist areas as a neutral force compared to the Protestant- and unionist-dominated RUC and Ulster Special Constabulary. However, this good relationship with nationalists did not last long. The Army was soon discredited in the eyes of many nationalists by incidents such as the Falls Curfew of July 1970, when 3,000 British troops imposed martial law conditions on the nationalist lower Falls area of west Belfast. After a gun and grenade attack on troops by Provisional IRA members, the British fired over 1,500 rounds of ammunition in gun battles with both the Official IRA and Provisional IRA in the area, killing six civilians. Thereafter, the Provisionals continued targeting British soldiers. The first soldier to die was gunner Robert Curtis, killed by Billy Reid in a gun battle in February 1971.

1970 and 1971 also saw feuding between the Provisional and Official IRAs in Belfast, as both organisations vied for supremacy in nationalist areas. Charlie Hughes, commander of the Provisionals' D Company in the Lower Falls, was killed before a truce was brokered between the two factions.

== Early campaign 1970–72 ==
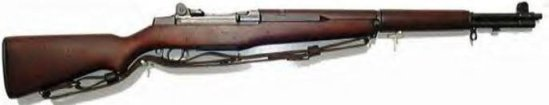
The M1 Garand rifle, typical of the World War II-era weaponry the Provisional IRA had in the early 1970s

In the early 1970s, the IRA imported large quantities of modern weapons and explosives, primarily from supporters in the Republic of Ireland and Irish diaspora communities within the Anglosphere as well as the government of Libya. Leader of the Opposition Harold Wilson in 1971 secretly met with IRA leaders with the help of John O'Connell, angering the Irish government; Garret FitzGerald wrote 30 years later that "the strength of the feelings of our democratic leaders ... was not, however, publicly ventilated at the time" because Wilson was a former and possible future British prime minister.

As the conflict escalated in the early 1970s, the numbers recruited by the IRA mushroomed, in response to the nationalist community's anger at events such as the introduction of internment without trial and Bloody Sunday, when the 1st Battalion, Parachute Regiment of the British Army shot dead 14 unarmed civil rights marchers in Derry.

The early 1970s were the most intense period of the Provisional IRA campaign. About half the total of 650 British soldiers to die in the conflict were killed in the years 1971–73. In 1972 alone, the IRA killed 100 British soldiers and wounded 500 more. In the same year, they carried out 1,300 bomb attacks and 90 IRA members were killed.

Up to 1972, the IRA controlled large urban areas in Belfast and Derry, but these were eventually re-taken by a major British operation known as Operation Motorman. Thereafter, fortified police and military posts were built in republican areas throughout Northern Ireland. During the early 1970s, a typical IRA operation involved sniping at British patrols and engaging them in firefights in urban areas of Belfast and Derry. They also killed RUC and Ulster Defence Regiment (UDR) soldiers, both on and off-duty, and a number of retired policemen and UDR soldiers. These tactics produced casualties for both sides and for many civilian bystanders. The British Army study of the conflict later described this period (1970–72), as the 'insurgency phase' of the IRA's campaign.

Another element of their campaign was the bombing of commercial targets such as shops and businesses. The most effective tactic the IRA developed for its bombing campaign was the car bomb, where large amounts of explosives were packed into a car, which was driven to its target and then detonated. Seán Mac Stíofáin, the first Chief of Staff of the Provisional IRA, described the car bomb both as a tactical and strategic weapon. From the tactical point of view, it tied down a great number of British troops in Belfast and other cities and major towns across Northern Ireland. Strategically, it hampered the British administration and government of the country, striking simultaneously at its economic structure. While most of the IRA's attacks on commercial targets were not intended to cause casualties, on many occasions they killed civilians. Examples include the bombing of the Abercorn restaurant in Belfast in March 1972, in which two young Catholic women were killed and 130 people injured, attributed to the IRA, which never acknowledged responsibility, as well as the bombing of the La Mon restaurant in County Down in February 1978, which resulted in the deaths of twelve Protestant civilian customers, and others maimed and injured.

In rural areas such as South Armagh (which is a majority Catholic area near the Irish border), the IRA unit's most effective weapon was the "culvert bomb", where bombs were planted under drains in country roads. This proved so dangerous for British Army patrols that virtually all troops in the area had to be transported by helicopter, a policy which continued until the last British Army base was closed in South Armagh.

== Ceasefires – 1972 and 1975 ==
The Provisional IRA declared two ceasefires in the 1970s, temporarily suspending its armed operations. In 1972, the IRA leadership believed that Britain was on the verge of leaving Northern Ireland. The British government held secret talks with the Provisional IRA leadership in 1972 to try to secure a ceasefire based on a compromise settlement within Northern Ireland. The Provisional IRA agreed to a temporary ceasefire from 26 June to 9 July. In July 1972, Provisional leaders Seán Mac Stíofáin, Dáithí Ó Conaill, Ivor Bell, Seamus Twomey, Gerry Adams and Martin McGuinness met a British delegation led by William Whitelaw. The IRA leaders refused to consider a peace settlement that did not include a commitment to British withdrawal to be completed by 1975, a retreat of the British Army to barracks and a release of republican prisoners. The British refused and the talks ended. On Bloody Friday in July 1972 in Belfast 22 bombs exploded, killing nine people and injuring 130. Bloody Friday was intended to be a demonstration of IRA strength following the ceasefire, but was a disaster for the IRA due to the authorities being unable to deal with so many simultaneous bomb alerts in a small area.

By the mid-1970s, it was clear that the hopes of the Provisional IRA leadership for a quick military victory were receding. Secret meetings between IRA leaders Ruairí Ó Brádaigh and Billy McKee with British Secretary of State for Northern Ireland Merlyn Rees secured an IRA ceasefire from February 1975 until January of the next year. The republicans believed initially that this was the start of a long-term process of British withdrawal. However, after several months, many in the IRA came to believe that the British were trying to bring the Provisional movement into peaceful politics without giving them any guarantees.

Critics of the IRA leadership, most notably Gerry Adams, felt that the ceasefire was disastrous for the IRA, leading to infiltration by British informers, the arrest of many activists and a breakdown in IRA discipline, which in turn led to tit-for-tat killings with loyalist groups fearful of a British sell-out and a feud with fellow republicans in the Official IRA. By early 1976, the IRA leadership, short of money, weapons and members, was on the brink of calling off the campaign. Instead, the ceasefire broke down in January 1976.

=== Late 1970s and the "Long War" ===
The years 1976 to 1979 under Roy Mason, Merlyn Rees' replacement as the Secretary of State for Northern Ireland, were characterised by a falling death rate for many reasons, including a drop in loyalist violence (attributed to the absence of political initiatives under Mason), and a change in IRA tactics after its weakening during the previous year's ceasefire. Mason developed a policy that rejected a political or military solution in favour of treating paramilitary violence "as a security problem". In addition, RUC Chief Constable Kenneth Newman took advantage of Emergency Powers legislation to subject suspected IRA members to "intensive and frequently rough" seven-day interrogations. British concentration on intelligence-gathering and recruiting of informers, accelerated during the 1975 ceasefire and continued under Mason, meant that arrests of IRA members rose steeply in this period. Between 1976 and 1979, 3,000 people were charged with "terrorist offences". There were 800 republican prisoners in Long Kesh alone by 1980.

In 1972, there were over 12,000 shooting and bombing attacks in Northern Ireland; by 1977, this was down to 2,800. In 1976, there were 297 deaths in Northern Ireland; in the next three years the figures were 112, 81, and 113. An IRA man contended that "we were almost beaten by Mason", and Martin McGuinness commented: "Mason beat the shit out of us". Mason's policy of 'criminalisation' led to the blanket protest in the prisons. When Mason left office in 1979, he predicted the IRA were "weeks away from defeat".

After the early years of the conflict, it became less common for the IRA to use large numbers of men in its armed actions. Instead, smaller but more specialised groups carried out sustained attritional attacks. In response to the 1975 ceasefire and the arrest of many IRA volunteers in its aftermath, the IRA re-organised their structures in 1977 into small cell-based units. While these were harder to infiltrate, the greater secrecy also caused a distance to develop between the IRA and sympathetic civilians. They also embarked on a strategy known as the "Long War" – a process of attrition based on the indefinite continuation of an armed campaign until the British government grew tired of the political, military and financial costs involved in staying in Northern Ireland. The British Army characterised this change in the IRA campaign as a move from "insurgency" to a "terrorist phase".

The highest military death toll from an IRA attack came on 27 August 1979, with the Warrenpoint ambush in County Down, when 18 British soldiers from the Parachute Regiment were killed by two culvert bombs placed by the South Armagh Brigade, a unit that didn't feel the need to adopt the cell structure because of its history of successfully avoiding intelligence failures. On the same day, the IRA killed one of their most famous victims, The Earl Mountbatten of Burma, assassinated along with two teenagers (aged 14 and 15) and The Dowager Lady Brabourne in County Sligo, by a bomb placed in his boat. Another effective IRA tactic devised in the late 1970s was the use of home-made mortars mounted on the back of trucks which were fired at police and army bases. These mortars were first tested in 1974 but did not kill anyone until 1979.

== Sectarian attacks ==
The IRA argued that its campaign was aimed not at Protestant and unionist people, but at the British presence in Northern Ireland, manifested in the state security forces. However, many unionists argue that the IRA's campaign was sectarian and there are many incidents where the organisation targeted Protestant civilians. The 1970s were the most violent years of the Troubles. As well as its campaign against the security forces, the IRA became involved, in the middle of the decade, in a "tit for tat" cycle of sectarian killings with loyalist paramilitaries. The worst examples of this occurred in 1975 and 1976. In September 1975, for example, IRA members machine-gunned an Orange Hall in Newtownhamilton, killing five Protestants. On 5 January 1976, in Armagh, IRA members operating under the proxy name South Armagh Republican Action Force shot dead ten Protestant building workers in the Kingsmill massacre.

In similar incidents, the IRA deliberately killed 91 Protestant civilians in 1974–76. The IRA did not officially claim the killings, but justified them in a statement on 17 January 1976, "The Irish Republican Army has never initiated sectarian killings ... [but] if loyalist elements responsible for over 300 sectarian assassinations in the past four years stop such killing now, then the question of retaliation from whatever source does not arise". In late 1976, the IRA leadership met with representatives of the loyalist paramilitary groups and agreed to halt random sectarian killings and car bombings of civilian targets. The loyalists revoked the agreement in 1979, after the IRA killing of Lord Mountbatten, but the pact nevertheless halted the cycle of sectarian revenge killings until the late 1980s, when the loyalist groups began killing Catholics again in large numbers.

After the British introduced their policy of "Ulsterisation" from the mid-1970s, IRA victims came increasingly from the ranks of the RUC and Ulster Defence Regiment, including off-duty and retired personnel. Most of these were Protestant and unionist, thus the killings were portrayed and perceived by many as a campaign of sectarian assassination. Historian Henry Patterson said about Fermanagh "that the killings struck at the Protestant community's morale, sense of security and belonging in the area was undeniable." while Democratic Unionist Party leader Ian Paisley claimed that the IRA campaign in Fermanagh was "genocidal". Protestants in the rural border areas of counties Fermanagh and Tyrone, where the number of members of the security forces killed was high, viewed the IRA's campaign as ethnic cleansing. These views have been challenged. Boyle and Hadden argue that the allegations do not stand up to serious scrutiny, while nationalists object to the term on the grounds that it is not used by unionists to describe similar killings or expulsions of Catholics in areas where they form a minority. Henry Patterson, professor of politics at the University of Ulster, concludes that while the IRA's campaign was unavoidably sectarian, it did not amount to ethnic cleansing. Although the IRA did not specifically target these people because of their religious affiliation, more Protestants joined the security forces so many people from that community believed the attacks were sectarian. IRA volunteer Tommy McKearney argues that due to the British government's Ulsterisation policy increasing the role of the locally recruited RUC and UDR, the IRA had no choice but to target them because of their local knowledge, but acknowledges that Protestants viewed this as a sectarian attack on their community. Gerry Adams, in a 1988 interview, claimed it was, "vastly preferable" to target the regular British Army as it "removes the worst of the agony from Ireland" and "diffuses the sectarian aspects of the conflict because loyalists do not see it as an attack on their community".

Rachel Kowalsaki argues that the IRA did not generally engage in sectarian activities but instead targeted those they deemed responsible for British rule in Northern Ireland and that they generally only targeted members of the military and police and made efforts to avoid civilian deaths. However, Kowalsaki notes that the IRA did not recognise that while they may have thought of themselves as fighting for a united Ireland, their actions were often perceived by the Northern Irish Unionists as sectarian attacks against Protestants. A similar argument was made by Lewis et al., who argue that the IRA's ideology – which held that Irish Protestants and Unionists were part of the imagined community of the Irish nation and were simply deluded into thinking themselves British by colonial oppression – meant that the organisation had an ideological restraint against mass sectarianism. However, the authors note that this same belief could also blind them to the actual effects of their campaign, as they did not acknowledge that Northern Irish Unionists regarded themselves as a distinct community and thus would perceive the IRA's activities as sectarian.

Timothy Shanahan argues that while the IRA did launch attacks against legitimate targets (defined as members of the security services), many members of the security services, such as the RUC and UDR, would themselves be Protestant, and would be presumed to be Protestant by the IRA. Thus any attacks on these legitimate targets would suffice in killing members of the Protestant community, negating any need for sectarian attacks on Protestant civilians. Shanahan thus argues that while the IRA may not have been sectarian as some loyalist paramilitaries, it may not have been as anti-sectarian as popularly claimed. Similar arguments were made by Steve Bruce, who also argued that Catholic RUC members were disproportionately targeted, which Bruce argues is because they were viewed as betraying their community, which only makes sense in the nature of a sectarian conflict. James Dingley argues that the IRA's focus on the idea of a united and independent Ireland made it de facto sectarian, as it did not recognise Ulster Unionists as a legitimate group and wanted to use violence to pursue goals that were opposed by the majority of the Northern Irish population.

Towards the end of the Troubles, the IRA widened their campaign even further, to include the killing of people who worked in a civilian capacity with the RUC and British Army. These workers were mostly, but not exclusively, Protestant, although Catholic judges, magistrates, and contractors were also assassinated by the IRA. In 1992, in Teebane, near Cookstown, an IRA bomb killed eight Protestant building workers who were working on a British Army base at Omagh.

== Attacks outside Northern Ireland ==
=== England ===
==== 1970s ====
The Provisional IRA was chiefly active in Northern Ireland, but from the early 1970s, it also took its bombing campaign to England. At a meeting of the Provisional IRA Army Council in June 1972, Seán Mac Stíofáin proposed bombing targets in England to "take the heat off Belfast and Derry". However, the Army Council did not consent to a bombing campaign in England until early 1973, after talks with the British government the previous year had broken down. They believed that such bombing would help create a demand among the British public for their government to withdraw from Northern Ireland.

The first IRA team sent to England included eleven members of the Belfast Brigade, who hijacked four cars in Belfast, fitted them with explosives and drove them to London via Dublin and Liverpool. The team were reported to the London Metropolitan Police and all but one of them were arrested. Nevertheless, two of the bombs exploded, killing one man and injuring 180 people.

Thereafter, control over IRA bombings in England was given to Brian Keenan from Belfast. Keenan directed Peter McMullen, a former member of the British Parachute Regiment, to carry out a series of bombings in 1973. A bomb planted by McMullen exploded at a barracks in Yorkshire, injuring a female canteen worker. On 23 September 1973, a British soldier died of wounds six days after being injured while attempting to defuse an IRA bomb outside an office block in Birmingham.

Some of the most indiscriminate bombing attacks and killings of the IRA's bombing campaign were carried out by a unit of eight IRA members, which included the Balcombe Street Gang, who were sent to London in early 1974. They avoided contact with the Irish community there in order to remain inconspicuous and aimed to carry out one attack a week. In addition to bombings, they carried out several assassination attempts. Ross McWhirter, a right wing politician who had offered a £50,000 reward for information leading to the arrest of the bombers, was shot dead at his home. The group later made an assassination attempt on Edward Heath. They were eventually arrested after a machine-gun attack on an exclusive restaurant on Mayfair. Pursued by police, they took two hostages (a married couple) and barricaded themselves for six days in a flat on Balcombe Street before they surrendered, an incident known as the Balcombe Street Siege. They were sentenced to thirty years each for a total of six murders. At their trial, the group admitted responsibility for the Guildford pub bombings of 5 October 1974, which killed five people (four of whom were off-duty soldiers) and injured 54, as well as the bombing of a pub in Woolwich, which killed another two people and injured 28.

On 21 November 1974, two pubs were bombed in the Birmingham pub bombings (an act widely attributed to the IRA, but not claimed by them), which killed 21 civilians and injured 162. An inadequate warning was given for one bomb and no warning for the other. There were no military targets associated with either of the pubs. The Guildford Four and Maguire Seven, and the Birmingham Six, were imprisoned for the Guildford and Birmingham bombings, respectively, but each group protested their innocence. They were eventually exonerated and released after serving lengthy prison sentences, even though the Balcombe Street group had admitted responsibility long before.

==== 1980s ====
After the campaign of the mid-1970s, the IRA did not undertake a major bombing campaign again in England until the late 1980s and early 1990s. However, throughout the intervening period, they did carry out a number of high-profile bombing attacks in England.

In October 1981 the IRA carried out the Chelsea Barracks bombing, the nail bomb was aimed at soldiers returning to Chelsea Barracks, but the blast killed two civilians passing by, 40 people were injured in the attack including 23 British soldiers. The same month a British bomb disposal expert Kenneth Robert Howorth, was killed trying to defuse an IRA bomb on Oxford Street, London.

In 1982 the Hyde Park and Regent's Park bombings killed 11 soldiers and wounded some 50 soldiers and civilians at a British Army ceremonial parade at Hyde Park, and a British Army band performance in Regent's Park in London.

In 1984, in the Brighton hotel bombing, the IRA tried to assassinate British Prime Minister Margaret Thatcher and her cabinet. She survived, but five people including Sir Anthony Berry, a Conservative Party Member of Parliament, Eric Taylor, the northwest party chairman, and three wives (Muriel Maclean, Jeanne Shattock, and Roberta Wakeham) of party officials were killed. Margaret Tebbit, wife of Norman Tebbit, was left permanently disabled.

In 1985 the IRA planned a sustained bombing campaign in London and English seaside resorts including Bournemouth, Southend and Great Yarmouth. The IRA planned for bombs to explode on sixteen consecutive days beginning in July, excluding Sundays. As well as damaging the tourist industry, the IRA hoped to take advantage of police resources being stretched and launch an assassination campaign against political and military targets including General Frank Kitson. Patrick Magee, who was wanted in connection with the Brighton hotel bombing after his palm print was found on the hotel register, was under police surveillance, with police hoping he would lead them to other IRA members. He met with an IRA member at Carlisle railway station, and they were followed to Glasgow, where they were arrested on 24 June 1985 at a safe house along with three other people, including Martina Anderson and Gerry McDonnell, who had escaped from the Maze Prison in 1983. On 11 June 1986 they were sentenced for conspiring to cause explosions and received life sentences, Magee was also convicted of the Brighton hotel bombing and received a life sentence with a minimum recommended sentence of 35 years.

On several more occasions, the Provisional IRA attacked British troops stationed in England, the most lethal of which was the Deal barracks bombing, in which 11 Royal Marines Band Service bandsmen were killed in 1989.

Republicans argued that these bombings "concentrated minds" in the British government far more than the violence in Northern Ireland. The IRA made a point of only striking at targets in England (not Scotland or Wales), although they once planted a small bomb on an oil terminal in the Shetland Isles in May 1981 on the same day that Queen Elizabeth II was attending a nearby function to mark the opening of the terminal. The bomb detonated, damaging a boiler but no one was injured and the ceremony continued. During the IRA's 25-year campaign in England, 115 deaths and 2,134 injuries were reported, from a total of almost 500 incidents.

==== Early 1990s ====
In the early 1990s the IRA intensified the bombing campaign in England, planting 15 bombs in 1990, 36 in 1991, and 57 in 1992. In February 1991 three mortar rounds were fired at the British Prime minister's office in Downing Street in London during a Cabinet meeting, which was a propaganda boost for the IRA.

During this period, the IRA also launched a highly damaging economic bombing campaign in English cities, particularly London, which caused a huge amount of physical and economic damage to property. Among their targets were the City of London, Bishopsgate and Baltic Exchange in London, with the Bishopsgate bombing causing damage initially estimated at £1 billion and the Baltic Exchange bombing £800 million of damage. A particularly notorious bombing was the Warrington bomb attack in 1993, which killed two young children, Tim Parry and Johnathan Ball. In early March 1994, there were three mortar attacks on Heathrow Airport in London, which forced the authorities to shut it down.

It has been argued that this bombing campaign convinced the British government (who had hoped to contain the conflict to Northern Ireland with its Ulsterisation policy) to negotiate with Sinn Féin after the IRA ceasefires of August 1994 and July 1997.

=== Elsewhere ===
The Provisional IRA also carried out attacks in other countries such as West Germany, Belgium, and the Netherlands, where British soldiers were based. Between 1979 and 1990, eight soldiers and six civilians died in these attacks, including the British Ambassador to the Netherlands Sir Richard Sykes and his valet, Karel Straub. In May 1988 the IRA killed three RAF men & injured three others in two separate attacks in the Netherlands. On one occasion, the IRA shot dead two Australian tourists in the Netherlands, claiming its members mistook them for off-duty British soldiers. On another occasion an IRA gunman shot dead Heidi Hazell, a German woman, as she sat alone in her car. She was parked near a British Army married quarter in Unna. They claimed she had been shot "in the belief that she was a member of the British Army garrison at Dortmund". Her husband was a British Army staff sergeant. Hans Engelhard, West Germany's justice minister called it "the insane act of a blind fanatic."

The IRA also sent members on arms importation, logistical support and intelligence operations at different times to continental Europe, Canada, the United States, Australia, Africa, Western Asia and Latin America. On at least one occasion IRA members traveled to Colombia.

== Libyan arms ==
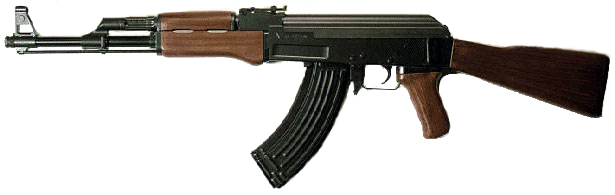
An AK-47 rifle, over 1,000 of which were smuggled by Muammar Gaddafi to the Provisional IRA in the 1980s

In the 1980s, the Provisional IRA received large quantities of modern weaponry, including heavy weaponry such as heavy machine guns, over 1,000 rifles, several hundred handguns, rocket-propelled grenades, flamethrowers, surface-to-air missiles and the plastic explosive Semtex, from the Libyan regime of Muammar Gaddafi. There were four successful shipments between 1985 and 1986; three of these trips were carried out by the trawler Casamara and a fourth by the oil-rig replenisher Villa. All told, they brought in 110 tons of weaponry. A fifth arms cargo on board the coaster Eksund was intercepted by the French Navy in 1987. This brought the Provisional IRA's new capability to the attention of the authorities on either side of the Irish border. Five men were captured with the boat; three IRA members, including Gabriel Cleary, received jail sentences. Reportedly, Gaddafi donated enough weapons to arm the equivalent of two infantry battalions.

The IRA therefore came to be very well armed in the latter part of the Troubles. Most of the losses it inflicted on the British Army, however, occurred in the early 1970s, although they continued to cause substantial casualties to the British military, the RUC and UDR throughout the conflict. According to author Ed Moloney, the IRA Army Council had plans for a dramatic escalation of the conflict in the late 1980s, which they likened to the Tet Offensive of the Vietnam War, with the aid of the arms obtained from Libya.

The plan had been to take and hold several areas along the border, forcing the British Army to either withdraw from border areas or use maximum force to re-take them – thus escalating the conflict beyond the point which the Provisional IRA thought that British public opinion would accept. However, this offensive failed to materialise. IRA sources quoted in the Secret History of the IRA by Ed Moloney say that the interception of the Eksund shipment eliminated the element of surprise which they had hoped to have for this offensive. The role of informers within the IRA seems to have also played a role in the failure of the "Tet Offensive" to get off the ground. Nevertheless, the shipments which got through enabled the IRA to begin a vigorous campaign in the 1980s. The success of the arms smuggling was a defeat for British intelligence and marked a turning point in the conflict in Northern Ireland. The Libyan weaponry allowed the IRA to wage war indefinitely.

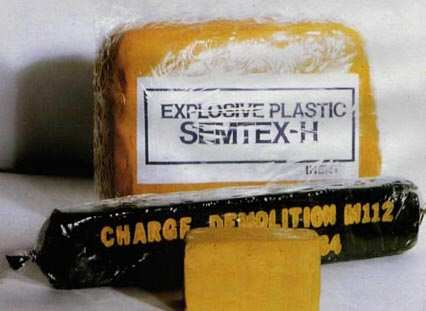
Samples of Semtex-H and C4 plastic explosives

In the event, much of the IRA's new heavy weaponry, for instance the surface-to-air missiles (SAMs) and flamethrowers, were never, or very rarely, used. The only recorded use of flamethrowers took place in the attack in Derryard, County Fermanagh, when two soldiers were killed when a permanent checkpoint manned by the King's Own Scottish Borderers was the target of a multiple weapons attack on 13 December 1989. The SAMs turned out to be out of date models, unable to shoot down British helicopters equipped with anti-missile technology. The missiles were eventually rendered useless when their batteries wore out. The Semtex plastic explosive proved the most valuable addition to the IRA's armoury.

As it was, the numbers of members of the British military personnel killed by the IRA increased in the years 1988–1990, from 12 in 1986 to 39 in 1988, but dropped to 27 in 1989 and decreased again to 18 in 1990. The death toll by 1991 was similar to that of the mid-1980s, with 14 fatalities. 32 members of the RUC were killed in the same period.

By the late 1980s, the Provisional IRA, in the judgement of journalist and author Brendan O'Brien, "could not be beaten, it could be contained". Politically and militarily, that was the most significant factor. By the late 1980s and early 1990s, roughly nine out of every ten IRA attacks were aborted or failed to cause casualties. Republican sources such as Mitchel McLaughlin and Danny Morrison argued that by the early 1990s, the Provisional IRA could not attain their objectives by purely military means.

A campaign to pressure Libya to pay compensation to IRA victims was derailed by the Libyan Crisis.

== Incidents with British special forces ==
The IRA suffered some heavy losses at the hands of British special forces like the Special Air Service (SAS), the heaviest being the killing of eight IRA members in the Loughgall Ambush in 1987, as they attempted to destroy the Loughgall RUC station. The East Tyrone Brigade was hit particularly hard by British killings of their members in this period, losing 28 members killed by British forces in the period 1987–1992, out of 53 dead in the whole conflict. In many of these cases, Provisional IRA members were killed after being ambushed by British special forces. Some authors alleged that this amounted to a campaign of assassination on the part of state forces (see shoot-to-kill policy in Northern Ireland).

Another high-profile incident took place in Gibraltar in March 1988, when three unarmed IRA members were shot dead by an SAS unit while scouting out a bombing target (see Operation Flavius). The subsequent funerals of these IRA members in Belfast were attacked by loyalist gunman Michael Stone. At a funeral of one of Stone's victims, two plainsclothes British Army corporals were abducted, beaten and shot dead by the IRA after driving into the funeral procession (see Corporals killings).

There were, however, a number of incidents in which undercover operations ended in failure, such as a shoot-out at the village of Cappagh on 24 March 1990, where plain-clothes members of the security forces were ambushed by an IRA unit, and, just two month later, Operation Conservation, which was thwarted by the IRA's South Armagh Brigade, A British soldier in an undercover position was shot dead in a counter-ambush. On 2 May 1980, Joe Doherty, Angelo Fusco, Paul Magee and another IRA member were arrested after being cornered by the SAS in a house in Belfast. SAS commander Captain Herbert Westmacott was hit by fire from an M60 machine gun and killed instantly.

== Loyalists and the IRA – killing and reprisals ==
The IRA and Sinn Féin suffered from a campaign of assassination launched against their members by loyalist paramilitaries from the late 1980s. These attacks killed about 12 IRA and 15 Sinn Féin members between 1987 and 1994. This tactic was unusual as the vast majority of loyalist victims were Catholic civilians. In addition, loyalists killed family members of known republicans; John (or Jack) McKearney and his nephew, Kevin McKearney, and Kevin's parents-in-law, Charles and Teresa Fox (whose son, Peter, was an IRA volunteer) were all targeted by the UVF. Two of Kevin's brothers, Pádraig and Sean, were IRA volunteers killed during the Troubles. According to recently released documents, British military intelligence stated in a secret 1973 draft report that within the Ulster Defence Regiment (UDR) it was likely there were soldiers who were also loyalist paramilitaries. Despite knowing this, the British Government stepped up the role of the UDR in "maintaining order" within Northern Ireland. British Government documents released on 3 May 2006 show that overlapping membership between British Army units like the UDR and loyalist paramilitary groups was a wider problem than a "few bad apples" as was often claimed.

The documents include a draft report titled "Subversion in the UDR" which detailed the problem. In 1973; an estimated 5–15% of UDR soldiers were directly linked to loyalist paramilitary groups, it was believed that the "best single source of weapons, and the only significant source of modern weapons, for Protestant extremist groups was the UDR", it was feared UDR troops were loyal to "Ulster" alone rather than to "Her Majesty's Government", the British Government knew that UDR weapons were being used in the assassination and attempted assassination of Roman Catholic civilians by loyalist paramilitaries.

Loyalists were aided in this campaign by elements of the security forces, including the British Army and RUC Special Branch (see Stevens Report). Loyalist sources have since confirmed that they received intelligence files on republicans from members of British Army and police intelligence in this period. A British Army agent within the Ulster Defence Association (UDA), Brian Nelson, was convicted in 1992 of the killings of Catholic civilians. It was later revealed that Nelson, while working as a British Army agent, was also involved in the importation of arms for loyalists from South Africa in 1988.

In 1993, for the first time since the 1960s, loyalist paramilitaries killed two more people than republican paramilitaries. In 1994, loyalists killed eleven more people than republicans, and in 1995, they killed twelve more. In the latter case (1995 period), the Provisional IRA 1994's cease-fire was still in place.

In response to these attacks, the IRA began a reactive assassination campaign against leading members of the UDA and UVF. By the late 1980s, the IRA Army Council would not sanction attacks on Protestant areas with a high likelihood of civilian casualties, but only on named, identified loyalist targets. The main reason for this was the negative impact of attacks on civilians on the republican movement's electoral appeal. The IRA issued a statement in 1986 saying: "At no time will we involve ourselves in the execution of ordinary Protestants, but at all times we reserve the right to take armed action against those who attempt to terrorise or intimidate our people into accepting British/unionist rule". Gerry Adams stressed his party's point of view in 1989; "Sinn Féin does not condone the deaths of people who are non-combatants".

To maximise the impact of the tactic, the IRA targeted senior loyalist paramilitary figures. Among the leading loyalists killed were John McMichael, Joe Bratty, Raymond Elder and Ray Smallwoods of the UDA and John Bingham and Robert Seymour of the UVF. Mechanic Leslie Dallas, shot dead by the IRA along with two elderly Protestants in 1989, was also claimed by the IRA to be a member of the UVF but his family and the UVF denied this. He is listed in the Sutton Index as a civilian.

One IRA bomb on 23 October 1993 caused civilian casualties, when a bomb was planted at a Shankill Road fish shop. The bomb was intended to kill the entire senior leadership of the UDA, including Johnny Adair, who sometimes met in a room above the shop. Instead, the bomb killed eight Protestant civilians, a low-level UDA member and also one of the bombers, Thomas Begley, when the device exploded prematurely. In addition, 58 more people were injured. This provoked a series of retaliatory killings by the UVF and UDA of Catholic civilians with no political or paramilitary connections. According to the Conflict Archive on the Internet (CAIN), University of Ulster statistics, the Provisional IRA killed 30 loyalist paramilitaries in total. Lost Lives gives a figure of 28 out of a total number of loyalists killed in the Troubles of 126.

According to The Irish War by Tony Geraghty, the IRA killed 45 loyalists. These killings intensified just before the IRA ceasefire of 1994, with UDA members Ray Smallwoods being killed on 11 July, Joe Bratty & Raymond Elder on 31 July & a UVF commander Billy Wright had been seriously injured by the IRA in June. As well as these IRA killings the other Republican paramilitary the Irish National Liberation Army killed three UVF men during the same period including UVF Belfast commander Trevor King. The loyalist groups called their ceasefire six weeks after the IRA ceasefire of that year and they argued that it was the killing of Catholic civilians and republicans that had forced the IRA ceasefire by placing intolerable pressure on nationalists, a view echoed by former deputy leader of the Ulster Unionist Party, John Taylor, Baron Kilclooney.

== Campaign up to and after the 1994 ceasefire ==
=== Early 1990s ===
The improvised mortar was the weapon of choice for the Provisional IRA during the 1990s.

By the early 1990s, although the death toll had dropped significantly from the worst years of the 1970s, the IRA campaign continued to severely disrupt normal life in Northern Ireland.

- In 1987, the IRA carried out almost 300 shooting and bombing attacks, killing 31 RUC, UDR and British Army personnel and 20 civilians, while injuring 100 security forces and 150 civilians.
- In 1990, IRA attacks killed 30 soldiers and RUC members and injured 340.
- In 1992, the figure for IRA attacks was 426.

The IRA was capable of carrying on with a significant level of violence for the foreseeable future. On the other hand, the goal of the British government in the 1980s was to destroy the IRA, rather than find a political solution. Moreover, in addition to those killed and injured, the conflict had a substantial economic cost. The UK had to devote an enormous budget to keep their security system in Northern Ireland running indefinitely.

From 1985 onward, the IRA carried out a five-year campaign against RUC and Army bases that resulted in 33 British security facilities destroyed and nearly a hundred seriously damaged. The attacks and bombings in the early 1990s forced the UK government to dismantle several bases and security posts, whose maintenance or reconstruction was not affordable. The presence of the British Army in the region increased from its lowest ebb of 9,000 men in 1985 to 10,500 by 1992 after an escalation of the IRA's mortar attacks.

In South Armagh, in contrast to other brigade areas, IRA activity increased in the early 1990s. Travelling by road in South Armagh became so dangerous for the British Army that by 1975 they began using helicopters to transport troops and supply its bases, a practice continued until the late 1990s. The IRA there shot down five helicopters (one in 1978, killing Lt. Col. Ian Corden-Lloyd, another one in 1988 and 1991 and two in 1994), and damaged at least another three in this period, using DShK heavy machine guns and improvised mortars. Another one was brought down in early 1990 in County Tyrone by the IRA's East Tyrone Brigade, wounding three crew members.

One of several methods the IRA used to counter British body armour was the use of high velocity Barrett Light 50 and Belgian FN sniper rifles, several of which the IRA imported from the US. Two snipers teams of the South Armagh Brigade killed nine members of the security forces in this way. To avoid the jamming of wireless-triggered detonators, the organisation began to employ radar beacons to prime their explosive devices, improving dramatically the effectiveness of the attacks. By 1992, the use of long-range weapons like mortars and heavy machine guns by the IRA had forced the British Army to build its checkpoints one to five miles from the border in order to avoid attacks launched from the Republic.

Another IRA technique used on several occasions between October 1990 and late 1991 was the "proxy bomb", where a victim was kidnapped and forced to drive a car bomb to its target. In the first series of attacks in October 1990, all three victims were Catholic men employed by the security forces. Their families were held hostage to ensure the proxies did as they were directed. The first proxy, at Coshquin (near Derry), died, along with six soldiers. The second proxy, at Cloghoge (or Cloghogue; near Newry), escaped but a soldier was killed. The third incident, at Omagh, produced no casualties due to a faulty detonator. Proxy bomb attacks continued for months afterwards; very large bombs (8,000 lb (3,600 kg)) were used in two attacks in November 1990 and September 1991. The proxy-bomb tactic was dropped, reportedly due to the revulsion it caused among nationalists.

In the early 1990s the IRA intensified its campaign against commercial and economic targets in Northern Ireland. For example, in May 1993 over four days the IRA detonated car bombs in Belfast, Portadown, and Magherafelt, County Londonderry, causing millions of pounds worth of damage. On 1 January 1994, the IRA planted eleven incendiary devices in shops and other premises in the Greater Belfast area in a "firebomb blitz" that caused millions of pounds worth of damage. In 1991, the IRA used a total of 142 cassette-type incendiary devices against shops and warehouses in Northern Ireland.

=== The ceasefires ===
In August 1994, the Provisional IRA announced a "complete cessation of military operations". This was the culmination of several years of negotiations between the Republican leadership, led by Gerry Adams and Martin McGuinness, various figures in the local political parties, the Irish government and British government. It was informed by the view that neither the UK forces, nor the IRA could win the conflict and that greater progress towards Republican objectives might be achieved by negotiation.

The devastation on Corporation Street in Manchester after the IRA bombing of 1996

While many Provisional IRA volunteers were reportedly unhappy with the end of armed struggle short of the achievement of a united Ireland, the peace strategy has since resulted in substantial electoral and political gains for Sinn Féin, the movement's political wing. It may now be argued that the Sinn Féin political party has eclipsed the Provisional IRA as the most important part of the republican movement. The ceasefire of 1994 therefore, while not a definitive end to Provisional IRA operations, marked the effective end of its full scale armed campaign.

The Provisional IRA called off its 1994 ceasefire on 9 February 1996 because of its dissatisfaction with the state of negotiations. They signaled the end of the ceasefire by detonating a truck bomb at Canary Wharf in London, which caused the deaths of two civilians and massive damage to property. In the summer of 1996, another truck bomb devastated Manchester city centre. However, the Provisional IRA campaign after the ceasefire was suspended during this period and never reached the intensity of previous years. In total, the IRA killed 2 British soldiers, 2 RUC officers, 2 British civilians, and 1 Garda in 1996–1997 according to the CAIN project. They resumed their ceasefire on 19 July 1997.

These Provisional IRA military activities of 1996–97 were widely believed to have been used to gain leverage in negotiations with the British government during the period. Whereas in 1994–95, the British Conservative Party government had refused to enter public talks with Sinn Féin until the IRA had given up its weapons, the Labour Party government in power by 1997 was prepared to include Sinn Féin in peace talks before IRA decommissioning. This precondition was officially dropped in June 1997.

Another widespread interpretation of the temporary breakdown in the first IRA ceasefire is that the leadership of Gerry Adams and Martin McGuinness tolerated a limited return to violence in order to avoid a split between hardliners and moderates in the IRA Army Council. Nevertheless, they emphasized in every public statement since the fall of 1996 the need for a second truce. Once they had won over or removed the militarists from the council, they re-instated the ceasefire.

== Casualties ==
According to the Conflict Archive on the Internet (CAIN), a research project at the University of Ulster, the IRA was responsible for 1,705 deaths, about 48% of the total conflict deaths. Of that figure:

- 1,009 (59%) were members or former members of the British security forces, including:
  - 697 British military personnel: 644 from the British Army (including the Ulster Defence Regiment/Royal Irish Regiment), 4 from the Royal Air Force, 1 from the Royal Navy, and 43 former British military personnel.
  - 312 British law enforcement personnel: 270 Royal Ulster Constabulary (RUC) officers, 14 former RUC officers, 20 Northern Ireland Prison Service (NIPS) officers, 2 former NIPS officers, and 6 English police officers.
- 508 (29%) were classed as civilians, including 17 political activists.
- 133 (7.8%) were members of the IRA, killed as informers or in premature explosions of bombs.
- 39 (2%) were loyalist paramilitary members: 26 Ulster Defence Association (UDA) members, 12 Ulster Volunteer Force (UVF) members and 1 Red Hand Commando member.
- 8 (nil%) were members of the Irish security forces, including 6 Gardaí, 1 Irish Prison Service officer, and 1 Irish Army soldier.
- 5 (nil%) were members of other republican paramilitary groups: 4 Official IRA members and 1 IPLO member.

Another detailed study, Lost Lives, states the Provisional IRA was responsible for the deaths of 1,781 people up to 2004. It says that, of this figure:

- 944 (53%) were members of the British security forces, including: 638 British military (including the UDR), 273 Royal Ulster Constabulary (including RUC reserve), 23 Northern Ireland Prison Service officers, five British police officers and five former British soldiers.
- 644 (36%) were civilians.
- 163 (9%) were Republican paramilitary members (including IRA members, most caused their own deaths when bombs they were transporting exploded prematurely).
- 28 (1.5%) were loyalist paramilitary members.
- 7 (nil%) were members of the Irish security forces (6 Gardaí and one Irish Army).

Lost Lives states that 294 Provisional IRA members died in the Troubles. The IRA lost 276 members during the Troubles according to the CAIN figures. In addition, a number of Sinn Féin activists or councillors were killed, some of whom were also IRA members. An Phoblacht gives a figure of 341 IRA and Sinn Féin members killed in the Troubles, indicating between 50 and 60 Sinn Féin deaths if the IRA deaths are subtracted.

About 120 Provisional IRA members caused their own deaths, almost all when they were killed by their own explosives in premature bombing accidents – 103 deaths according to CAIN, 105 according to an RUC report of 1993. Nine IRA members died on hunger strike. Lost Lives gives a figure of 163 killings of republican paramilitary members (this includes bombing accidents and feuds with republicans from other organisations). Of the remaining 200 or so IRA dead, around 150 were killed by the British Army, with the remainder killed by loyalist paramilitaries, the RUC and the UDR.

Far more common than the killing of IRA volunteers however, was their imprisonment. Journalists Eamonn Mallie and Patrick Bishop estimate in The Provisional IRA (1988), that between 8,000–10,000 Provisional IRA members were, up until that point, imprisoned during the course of the conflict, a number they also give as the total number of IRA members during the Troubles. The total number of Provisional IRA members imprisoned must be higher, once the figures from 1988 onwards are included.

== Assessments ==
IRA poster

=== British Army official report ===
An internal British Army document released under the Freedom of Information Act 2000 in 2007 stated an expert opinion that the British Army had failed to defeat the IRA by force of arms but also claims to have "shown the IRA that it could not achieve its ends through violence". The report examined 37 years of British troop deployment and was compiled following a six-month study by a team of three officers carried out in early 2006 for General Sir Mike Jackson, the British Army's Chief of the General Staff. The military assessment describes the IRA as "professional, dedicated, highly skilled and resilient".

The paper divides the IRA activity and tactics in two main periods: The "insurgency" phase (1971–1972), and the "terrorist" phase (1972–1997). The British Army claims to have curbed the IRA insurgency by 1972, after Operation Motorman, but IRA members fled to the nearby Republic of Ireland safe from British capture where they continued to carry out cross-border attacks into Northern Ireland with weapons made in the South or sourced overseas. As a result, the IRA remerged as a cell-structured group. The report also asserts that the government efforts by the 1980s were aimed to destroy the IRA, rather than negotiate a political solution, and that the British campaign produced no final victory "in any recognisable way". One of the conclusions from the paper reveals the failure of the British Army to engage the IRA at strategic level and the lack of a single campaign authority and plan.

=== Other analyses ===
Some authors, including Brendan O'Brien, Patrick McCarthy, Peter Taylor, Tom Hayden, Fergus Finlay and Timothy J. White, also concluded that, unlike previous IRA campaigns, the Provisionals had not been defeated but had arrived at the conclusion of a bloody stalemate in which neither side could destroy the other. According to O'Brien, the IRA "could end its armed campaign from a avowed position of strength, discipline and military capacity. They had not been defeated." Political analysts Brian Barton and Patrick Roche maintain that while the IRA, although undefeated, fell short of their ultimate goal of a united Ireland, the IRA campaign was eventually legitimised by the peace process and the Good Friday Agreement.

== Other activities ==
Apart from its armed campaign, the Provisional IRA was also involved in many other activities, including "policing" of nationalist communities, robberies and kidnapping for the purposes of raising funds, fund raising in other countries, involvement in community events and parades, and intelligence gathering. The Independent Monitoring Commission (IMC), a body supervising the ceasefire and activities of paramilitary groups in Northern Ireland has judged the Provisional IRA to have ceased all of the above activities. The IMC issues a bi-yearly public report on the activities of all paramilitary groups operating and known of in Northern Ireland.

=== Paramilitary policing ===
Activities deemed punishable by the Provisional IRA (often described as "anti-social activities"), included collaboration with the RUC and/or British Army i.e. informing, drug dealing, criminal activity outside of the Provisional IRA, joy riding, spreading of dissent, and any other activities which might either damage the Provisional IRA or interests of the community as defined by the Provisional IRA. For the most part, the list of activities deemed punishable by the Provisional IRA coincided with those deemed punishable by the community at large. Punishments ranged in severity from verbal warnings to physical attacks, through to wounding by gunshot, progressing to forcing the suspect to flee Ireland for their lives and death. This process was often described as "summary justice" by the political establishment and media. In the majority of cases the Provisional IRA claimed that there had been a full investigation and that guilt had been established before their sentence was carried out. The process, which was widely known of in nationalist communities, worked on a sliding scale of severity – in the case of a petty thief a warning to stop may initially be issued, escalating to a physical attack known as a "punishment beating" usually with baseball bats or similar tools. If the behaviour continued then a more serious physical assault known as a "knee-capping" (gunshot wounds to limbs, hands, joints) would occur. The final level would be a threat of death against the suspect if they did not leave the island of Ireland, and if this order was not adhered to, death. The IMC has noted that the Provisional IRA has repeatedly come under pressure from nationalist community members since its cessation of violence to resume such policing but has resisted such requests.

Suspected informers and those who cooperated with the RUC and British Army (sometimes referred to as collaborators) were generally dealt with by a counter-intelligence unit titled the Internal Security Unit (ISU), sometimes referred to as the "nutting squad". Typically, the ISU would abduct and interrogate suspects frequently using torture to extract confessions. The interrogations would often be recorded and played back to senior Provisional IRA members at a secretly held board of inquiry. This board would then pronounce judgement, usually a fatal gunshot to the head. A judgement as severe as death was frequently made public in the form of a communique released to the media but in some cases, for reasons of political expediency, the Provisional IRA did not announce responsibility. The bodies of killed informers were usually found shot dead by roadsides in isolated areas. On occasion recordings of their confessions were released to the media.

This style of summary justice, often meted out based on evidence of dubious quality, by untrained investigators and self-appointed judges frequently led to what the Provisional IRA has acknowledged as horrific mistakes. As of February 2007, the IMC has stated that the Provisional IRA has issued "instructions to members not to use physical force" and noted what it describes as "the leadership's maintenance of a firm stance against the involvement of members in criminality." Where criminality has been engaged in by Provisional IRA, members of the IMC note that "we were satisfied these individual activities were contrary to the express injunctions of the leadership".

=== Internal republican feuds ===
The Provisional IRA has also targeted other republican paramilitary groups and dissenting members of the Provisional IRA who refuse or disregard orders. In 1972, 1975 and 1977, the Official IRA and Provisional IRA engaged in attacks on the opposing organisation leaving several dead on either side. In 1992, The Provisional IRA attacked and eliminated the Irish People's Liberation Organisation (IPLO), which was widely perceived as being involved in drug dealing and other criminality in West Belfast. One IPLO member was killed, several knee-capped and more ordered to disband. The last known example of this practise as of February 2007 took place in 2000 and involved the shooting dead of a Real Irish Republican Army member for his opposition to the Provisionals' ceasefire.

=== Activities in Republic of Ireland ===
Although the Provisional IRA's General Order No.8 forbids military action "against 26 County forces under any circumstances whatsoever", members of the Garda Síochána (the Republic of Ireland's police force) have also been killed, including Detective Garda Jerry McCabe. McCabe was killed by machine-gun fire as he sat in his patrol car in Adare County Limerick during the escort of a post office delivery in 1996. Sinn Féin has called for the release of his killers under the terms of the Good Friday Agreement. In total, the Provisional IRA killed six Gardaí and one Irish Army soldier, mostly during robberies.

==== Robberies and criminal enterprise ====
The Provisional IRA has carried out numerous bank and post office robberies across Ireland throughout its existence. An RUC estimate from 1982 to 1983, puts the amount stolen in such raids by the Provisional IRA at around £700,000 (sterling). Also in the 1980s, the Provisional IRA were involved in the kidnapping and ransom of businessmen Gaelen Weston, Ben Dunne and Don Tidey. Activities such as these were linked to the IRA's fund-raising. Gardaí estimate that the Provisional IRA got up to £1.5 million from these activities. Activities include smuggling, sale of stolen items and contraband including cigarettes, red diesel, extortion, protection rackets, and money laundering. Most recently, the Provisional IRA have been blamed for carrying out the Northern Bank robbery in December 2004, although no proof was ever forwarded and this crime remains unsolved. The IMC note that in their view the Provisional IRA has not had any "organisational involvement in robbery or other such organised crime".

Thomas Murphy, a prominent Provisional IRA leader from South Armagh, has been the subject of repeated rumours of organised crime including diesel smuggling and tax evasion. In 2006 both Irish and British security forces mounted a major joint raid on his farm, and in December 2015 he was arrested and put on trial in Dublin's Special Criminal Court charged with tax evasion. He was found guilty of tax evasion on 17 December 2015.

== See also ==
- Improvised tactical vehicles of the Provisional IRA
- List of attacks on British aircraft during The Troubles
- List of chronologies of Provisional Irish Republican Army actions
