= Bernard McGinn =

Bernard McGinn may refer to:

- Bernard McGinn (theologian) (born 1937), American Roman Catholic theologian
- Bernard Henry McGinn (c. 1957–2013), member of the Irish Republican Army
