= Forensic Science Laboratory bombing =

1992 IRA attack in Belfast, Northern Ireland

- Part of the Troubles
- Location: Newtownbreda, Belfast, Northern Ireland
- Date: 23 September 1992 (UTC)
- Target: Northern Ireland Forensic Science Laboratory
- Attack type: Van bomb
- Deaths: 0
- Injuries: 20
- Perpetrators: Provisional Irish Republican Army; South Armagh Brigade

The Provisional Irish Republican Army (IRA) targeted the Northern Ireland Forensic Science Laboratory (NIFSL) facilities on Newtownbreda Road in the southern outskirts of Belfast with a large 3,000 lb bomb on 23 September 1992. The huge impact of the bomb destroyed the lab and damaged over 1,000 homes within a 1.5 mile radius, including adjacent Belvoir Park, a Protestant housing estate. It was one of the biggest bombs ever detonated during Northern Ireland's Troubles, causing massive damage and being felt over 10 miles away. Hundreds of residents had to be treated for shock. Several military vehicles were damaged. The lab was a key target because it analysed evidence in cases involving IRA attacks. The IRA had given a warning, and British Army bomb disposal experts were investigating an abandoned van when the explosion occurred. One estimate put the repair damage cost at £20 million at the time.

According to journalist and author Toby Harnden, the attack was planned and carried out from beginning to end by the IRA South Armagh Brigade. Volunteers from the brigade hijacked a truck near Newry and packed it with explosives weighing 3,500 pounds (1,600 kg). They left the truck outside the Forensic Science Laboratory at 8:40pm. Nearly 45 minutes later, after a coded warning, the bomb exploded.

== See also ==
- Glenane barracks bombing
- Attack on Cloghoge checkpoint
- Provisional Irish Republican Army campaign 1969–1997
