= Michael McVerry =

IRA member

Michael McVerry (1 December 1949 – 15 November 1973), was a Provisional Irish Republican Army volunteer and Officer Commanding of the First Battalion of the Provisional IRA South Armagh Brigade. He was killed in Keady in 1973.

McVerry was born and raised in the townland of Skerriff near Cullyhanna, County Armagh, Northern Ireland. He attended Cullyhanna Primary School and later Bessbrook Technical College before starting work on building sites throughout Ireland.

Michael McVerry joined the IRA in August 1971. He was imprisoned in Mountjoy Prison and later The Curragh camp, both in the Republic of Ireland, where he took part in a hunger and thirst strike. On Sunday, 29 October 1972 he and six other republican prisoners (Colm Murphy, James Hazlett, Tommy Corrigan, Paddy Carty, James McCabe and Christopher Murphy) audaciously escaped from The Curragh through a tunnel and returned to IRA active service.

He gradually became the most experienced guerrilla fighter in the IRA at that time and a legend among the local republican population in south Armagh. In 1973 he lost his hand while testing grenades.

On 15 November 1973 he was killed during an attack on the Royal Ulster Constabulary (RUC) barracks in Keady. He was shot by British soldiers after placing a 100 lb bomb against the gable wall of the barracks during the IRA attack. The resulting explosion badly damaged the station and surrounding properties. A second device failed to detonate. A gun battle started as the IRA unit withdrew after attack between them and members of the RUC and British Army in which a policeman was shot in the shoulder. One member of the IRA was also hit. The IRA unit escaped towards Carnagh Custom Post on the border, where they hijacked two cars and set fire to the Custom Post before escaping across the border. McVerry was taken to St Mary's Hospital in Castleblayney, County Monaghan, but was found to be dead on arrival from a bullet wound in the stomach.
