= Bernard Henry McGinn =

IRA volunteer and bomb-maker (1957–2013)

- Born: c. 1957; Castleblayney, County Monaghan, Ireland
- Died: Monaghan Town, Ireland
- Body discovered: 21 December 2013
- Occupation: Irish republican volunteer
- Organization: Provisional Irish Republican Army
- Known for: IRA activity
- Criminal status: Released under the Good Friday Agreement (2000)

Bernard Henry McGinn (c. 1957 – body discovered 21 December 2013) was a Provisional Irish Republican Army (IRA) volunteer who was sentenced to a total of 490 years' imprisonment in 1999. He was released in 2000 under the terms of the Good Friday Agreement.

== Early life and background ==
McGinn was born into an Irish republican family in Castleblayney, County Monaghan, Ireland c. 1957. His father was a former Sinn Féin councillor and his brother-in-law, Caoimhghín Ó Caoláin, has been a Sinn Féin TD for Cavan–Monaghan since 1997.

== IRA Activity ==
In 1978 Dessie O'Hare and McGinn killed Thomas Johnston, a former member of the Ulster Defence Regiment (UDR) in Keady, South Armagh. In 1979 McGinn was arrested at a disused farmhouse and charged with possession of explosives. He failed to turn up at his trial and was sentenced to 10 years' imprisonment in absentia. After several months on the run, he was arrested in Dundalk following a 27-hour siege, during which he held a family hostage with a pistol and a hand grenade. McGinn was released from prison in 1987, and joined the IRA's South Armagh Brigade. Initially viewed as an outsider, within several years he became a trusted member of the brigade, helping assemble bombs used by the IRA in England. He was a member of one of two sniper teams which killed nine members of the security forces between 1992 and 1997, including Lance Bombardier Stephen Restorick, who was killed by a single shot from a Barrett M90 sniper rifle on 12 February 1997, and was the last British Army soldier to be killed during The Troubles.

== Arrest and trial ==
McGinn and other members of the sniper team were arrested by the Special Air Service at a farm near Crossmaglen on 10 April 1997, and taken to Gough Barracks in Armagh for questioning. During a week of questioning, McGinn confessed to his role in the IRA bombing campaign, and implicated more than twenty members of the South Armagh Brigade in attacks in Northern Ireland and England. He claimed to have manufactured explosive mixes varying from between 200 pounds and 10 tons, and said it was "like a day's work".

On 19 March 1999 McGinn was sentenced to a total of 490 years' imprisonment for 34 separate offences, including the murder of three British soldiers, and involvement in the 1992 bombing of the Baltic Exchange, the 1996 Docklands bombing, and the bombing of Hammersmith Bridge later the same year. He laughed at his sentence, knowing that he would be freed, at most, in shortly over a year under the terms of the Good Friday Agreement. Two months after his conviction McGinn was temporarily released on compassionate grounds to visit his sick mother, which caused anger and consternation among unionists. On 28 July 2000, McGinn was freed from HM Prison Maze, after serving 16 months.

=== Appeal ===
On 5 October 2000 McGinn's convictions for explosives offences and the soldiers' murders were overturned at the Court of Appeal in Belfast on the grounds that he was not properly cautioned before he confessed. The court, however, dismissed his appeals against convictions for conspiracy to murder and firearms possession for which he received a twenty-year sentence at his original trial.

== Death ==
McGinn was found dead at a house in Monaghan Town on 21 December 2013. The cause of death remained unknown, pending a post-mortem examination. It was later reported that he died of a suspected heart attack.
