= South Armagh Sniper (1990–1997) =

IRA sniping campaign against British security forces

South Armagh sniper campaign (1990–97)
- Part of the Troubles and Operation Banner
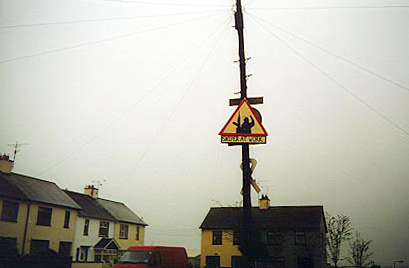
- A "Sniper at Work" sign in Crossmaglen
| Date | March 1990 – March 1997 |
| Location | Southern County Armagh, Northern Ireland |
| Result | IRA victory Mobility of foot patrols further restricted |

Belligerents
| Provisional IRA: South Armagh Brigade | United Kingdom: British Army; Royal Ulster Constabulary |

Commanders and leaders
| Frank McCabe | Captain Rupert Thorneloe; Staff Sergeant Gaz Hunter |

Strength
| 2 sniper teams 1 improvised armoured vehicle | British Army patrols RUC patrols 3 SAS units |

Casualties and losses
| 1 sniper team captured | 7 soldiers killed 2 constables killed 1 constable wounded |
- Another soldier in Belfast and an RUC officer in County Fermanagh were killed by IRA snipers in the same period

The South Armagh Sniper is the generic name given to the members of the Provisional Irish Republican Army's (IRA) South Armagh Brigade who conducted a sniping campaign against the British Army from 1990 to 1997. The campaign is notable for the snipers' use of .50 BMG calibre Barrett M82 and M90 anti-materiel rifles in some of the shootings.

== Origins ==
One of the first leaders of the Provisional IRA, Seán Mac Stíofáin, supported the use of snipers in his book Memoirs of a Revolutionary and was attracted by the motto "one shot, one kill". Most of the soldiers who were shot dead in 1972, the bloodiest year of the conflict in Northern Ireland, were killed by IRA snipers. About 180 British soldiers, Royal Ulster Constabulary (RUC) officers were killed that way between 1971 and 1991. The Armalite AR-18 rifle became the weapon of choice for the IRA's members in that time.

The British Army's assessment of the conflict asserted that the IRA's sniping skills often did not match those expected from a well-trained sniper. The report identifies four different patterns of small arms attacks during the IRA campaign, the last being that developed by the South Armagh sniper units.

== Sniper teams in South Armagh ==
=== Rifles ===
During the 1980s, the IRA relied mostly on weaponry smuggled from Libya. The regular shipments from the United States, once the main source of arms for the republicans through the gunrunning operations of Irish immigrant and IRA veteran George Harrison, were disrupted after he was arrested by the Federal Bureau of Investigation in 1981. The smuggling scheme suffered a further blow when the Fenit-based trawler Marita Ann, with a huge arms cache from Boston, was captured by the Irish Naval Service in 1984.

Between the mid-1980s and the 1990s, there was some small-scale activity, leading to the purchase of US-made Barrett M82 and M90 rifles, which became common weapons for the South Armagh snipers. According to letters seized by US federal authorities from a Dundalk IRA member, Martin Quigley, who had travelled to the US to study computing at Lehigh University in Pennsylvania, the organisation managed to smuggle an M82 to the Republic of Ireland just before his arrest in 1989. He was part of a larger plot to import electronic devices to defeat British Army countermeasures against IRA remote-controlled bombs.

In August 1986, another M82 had been sent in pieces from Chicago to Dublin, where the rifle was reassembled. At least two of the M90 rifles were bought as recently as six months after the first IRA ceasefire. It was part of a batch of two sold to Michael Suárez, a Cuban resident of Cleveland, on 27 January 1995 by a firearms dealer. Suárez later passed the weapons to an Irishman, who finally shipped the rifles, their ammunition and two telescopic sights to the Republic of Ireland. An unidentified leading figure inside the IRA sniper campaign, quoted by Toby Harnden, said:

What's special about the Barrett is the huge kinetic energy.... The bullet can just walk through a flak jacket. South Armagh was the prime place to use such weapon because of the availability of Brits. They came to dread it and that was part of its effectiveness.

Three of the security forces members killed in the campaign were the victims of 7.62×51mm rounds instead. Five missed shots belonged to the same kind of weapon. Harnden recalls a Belgian FN FAL rifle recovered by the Gardaí near Inniskeen in 1998 as the possible source of these bullets. Security sources suspected a Heckler & Koch PSG1 sniper rifle might have been used in some attacks.

=== Shootings ===
| Victim name and rank | Date | Location | Rifle calibre used |
|---|---|---|---|
| Paul Turner, private | 28 August 1992 | Crossmaglen | .50 BMG |
| Jonathan Reid, constable | 25 February 1993 | Crossmaglen | 7.62 mm |
| Lawrence Dickson, lance corporal | 17 March 1993 | Forkhill | 7.62 mm |
| John Randall, private | 26 June 1993 | Newtownhamilton | 7.62 mm |
| Kevin Pullin, lance corporal | 17 July 1993 | Crossmaglen | .50 BMG |
| Brian Woods, constable | 2 November 1993 | Newry | .50 BMG |
| Paul Garret, lance bombardier | 2 December 1993 | Keady | .50 BMG |
| Daniel Blinco, guardsman | 30 December 1993 | Crossmaglen | .50 BMG |
| Stephen Restorick, lance bombardier | 12 February 1997 | Bessbrook | .50 BMG |

Contrary to the first British Army assessment and the speculation of the press, there was not just a single sniper involved. According to Harnden, there were two different teams, one responsible for the east part of South Armagh, around Dromintee, the other for the west, in the area surrounding Cullyhanna. The volunteer in charge of the Cullyhanna unit was Frank "One Shot" McCabe, a senior IRA member from Crossmaglen.

Each team comprised at least four members, not counting those in charge of support activities, such as scouting for targets and driving vehicles. Military officials claim that the Dromintee-based squad deployed up to 20 volunteers in some of the sniping missions. The teams made good use of dead ground to conceal themselves from British observation posts.

The sniper attack on a checkpoint at Newry killed Constable Brian Woods and was officially reported in an IRA South Down Brigade statement, but a high-profile IRA member from Dromintee, identified by Toby Harnden as a South Armagh Brigade volunteer known as "The Surgeon", was identified by the author as the mastermind behind the shooting.

Between 1990 and 1997, 24 shots were fired at British forces. The first eight operations (1990–1992), ended in misses. On 16 March 1990, the Barrett M82 was used for the first time by the IRA. The target was a checkpoint defended by soldiers of The Light Infantry regiment on Castleblaney Road. A single .50 round pierced the helmet and skimmed the skull of Lance Corporal Hartsthorne, who survived with minor head injuries. In August 1992, one team mortally wounded a Light Infantry soldier. By April 1997, seven soldiers and two policemen had been killed. An RUC constable almost lost one of his legs in the last sniper attack during the Troubles.

Another six rounds achieved nothing, but two of them narrowly missed the patrol boat HMS Cygnet, in Carlingford Lough and another holed Borucki sangar, a British Army outpost in Crossmaglen square. On 31 July 1993 at 10:00 pm a British Army patrol which had set up a mobile checkpoint on Newry Road, near Newtownhamilton, was fired at by an IRA sniper team. The British soldiers returned fire, but there were no casualties on either side. The marksman usually fired from a distance of less than 300 m, despite the 1 km effective range of the rifles. Sixteen operations were carried out from the rear of a vehicle, with the sniper protected by an armour plate in case the patrols returned fire. At least in one incident, after the killing of a soldier in Forkhill on 17 March 1993, had the British Army fire back at the sniper's vehicle without effect. The IRA vehicles were escorted by scout cars, to alert about the presence of security checkpoints ahead.

Two different sources include in the campaign two incidents that happened outside South Armagh; one in Belcoo, County Fermanagh, where a constable was killed, the other in West Belfast, which resulted in the death of a British soldier. The IRA Belfast Brigade claimed that the latter incident actually involved two shooters, who fired 28 rounds from assault rifles on a British Army vehicle. An RUC investigation after the Belfast ambush led to the discovery of one Barrett M82, hidden in a derelict house. It was later determined that this rifle was the weapon responsible for the first killing in South Armagh in 1992. Another Barrett is reported to have been in possession of the IRA team in the Occupation of Cullaville in South Armagh in April 1993.

A third unrelated sniper attack, which resulted in the death of a British soldier, was carried out by the IRA in the New Lodge, North Belfast, on 3 August 1992. Two other soldiers were wounded by snipers in the New Lodge, which was suitable for sniper attacks because of the number of high-rise flats in the area, in November 1993 and January 1994. Two people were arrested and a loaded rifle recovered in the aftermath of the latter incident. On 30 December 1993, Guardsman Daniel Blinco became the last soldier killed by snipers in South Armagh before the first IRA ceasefire in 1994.

His killing, along with the reaction of the MP of his constituency, was covered by the BBC's Inside Ulster, which also showed Blinco's abandoned helmet and the hole that was made by the sniper's bullet on the wall of a bar. The tabloid press of the time started calling the sniper 'Goldfinger' or 'Terminator', the nicknames current in Crossmaglen's bars. The last serviceman killed by snipers at South Armagh, Lance Bombardier Stephen Restorick, was also the last British soldier to die by hostile fire during the Troubles, on 12 February 1997. Restorick's killing resulted in a public outcry. Gerry Adams called his death "tragic" and wrote a letter of condolence to his mother.

=== Caraher team captured ===
The IRA ceasefire from 31 August 1994 gave an opportunity to the British to collect intelligence to be used against the snipers. The truce was strongly resented by South Armagh IRA members. During the ceasefire, an alleged member of the Drumintee squad, Kevin Donegan, was arrested by an RUC patrol in relation to the 1994 murder of a postal worker in the course of an armed robbery. When the IRA ended the ceasefire with the bombing of the London Docklands in February 1996, some republicans had already abandoned the organisation, and others had turned to criminal activities. The period after the ceasefire saw little IRA activity in South Armagh.

After two attacks in 1997, a Special Air Service unit captured four men from the sniper team based in the west of the region on 10 April, who were responsible for several deaths. After a brief scuffle, James McArdle, Michael Caraher, Bernard McGinn and Martin Mines were seized at a farm near Freeduff and handed over to the RUC. The British troops were under strict orders to avoid IRA casualties. A Barrett M90 rifle was seized, which forensic and intelligence reports linked only to the 1997 shootings. It was suggested by a former member of the Special Forces that there was an informer, a claim dismissed by the Police Ombudsman report.

McGinn provided the RUC with a lot of information about IRA activities and even betrayed Frank McCabe, the IRA commander behind the sniper campaign, but he eventually withdrew his statement. One of the key players in the British campaign against the South Armagh sniper was Welsh Guards' Captain Rupert Thorneloe, according to the journalist Toby Harnden. Thorneloe worked as an intelligence liaison officer between the 3rd Infantry Brigade and the RUC Special Branch. Thorneloe, who reached the rank of lieutenant-colonel, was killed in July 2009 by an improvised explosive device during the war in Afghanistan. Another senior figure involved in the British efforts against the sniper squads was SAS Staff Sergeant Gaz Hunter, whose experience in South Armagh dated back to 1975. Despite the sense of relief among British forces after the arrests, there was concern over the other two Barrett rifles still in the possession of the South Armagh Brigade.

One of the IRA volunteers captured, Michael Caraher, was the brother of Fergal Caraher, a Sinn Féin member and IRA volunteer killed by Royal Marines at a checkpoint on 30 December 1990 near Cullyhanna. Michael, also shot and wounded in the same incident, had lost a lung in the aftermath. The Marines involved were tried and acquitted by Lord Chief Justice Hutton. The shooting of Guardsman Daniel Blinco in Crossmaglen took place on the third anniversary of the killing of Fergal Caraher. Michael Caraher was thought to be the shooter in several attacks, but he was indicted only for the case of the maimed constable. He was defended by the solicitor Rosemary Nelson who was later killed by the loyalist organisation Red Hand Defenders. The other three men of the sniper team were convicted in 1999 for six killings, two of them unrelated to the sniping operations (the deaths of two men when one of the team's members, James McArdle, planted the bomb at Canary Wharf in 1996).

The capture of the sniper unit was the greatest success for the security forces in South Armagh in more than a decade. The men were set free 16 months later, under the terms of the Good Friday Agreement. The Dromintee sniper party was never apprehended.

== Conclusions ==
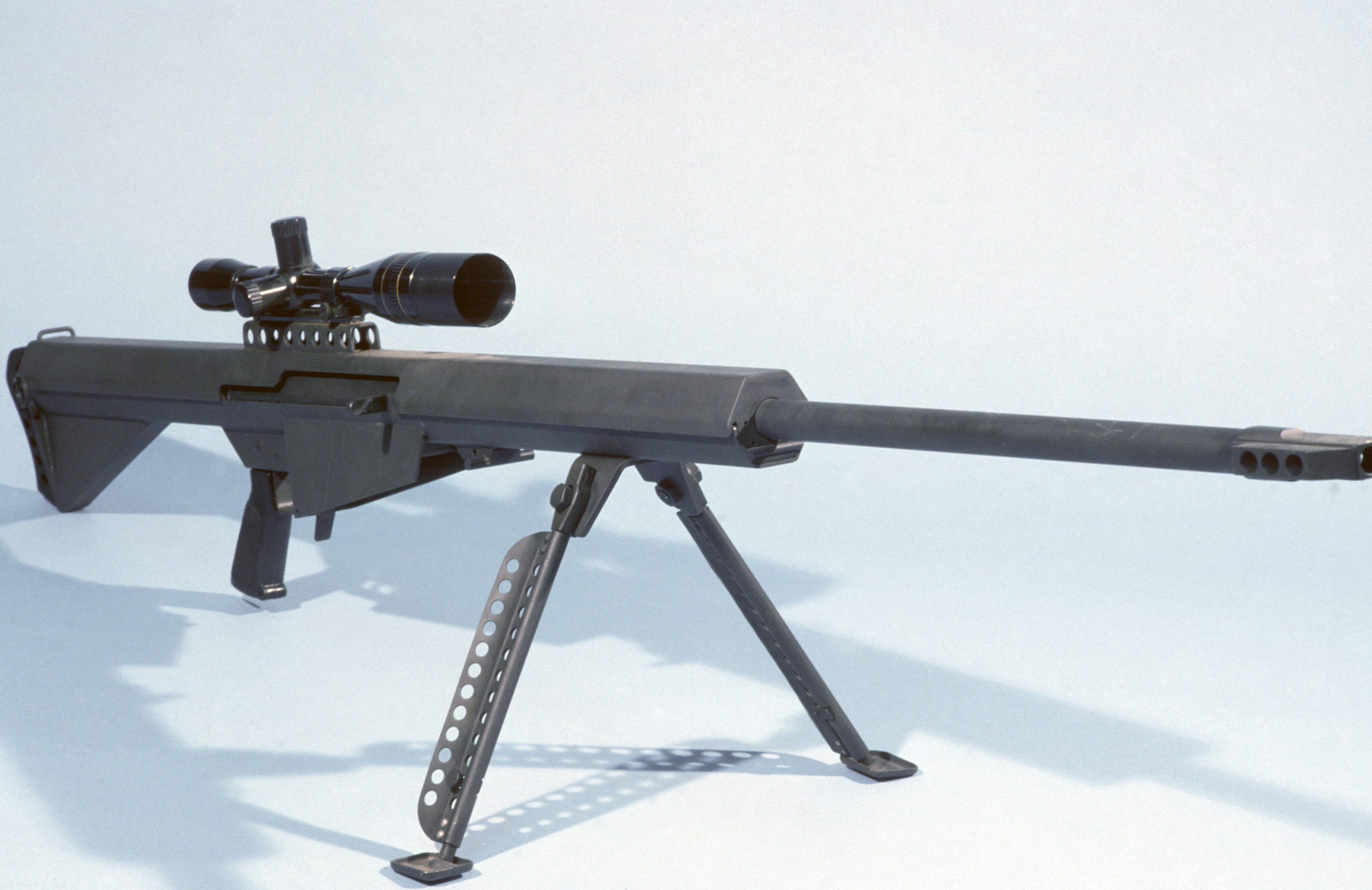
Barrett M82 rifle, the main weapon used by the sniper squads

The IRA sniping activities further restricted the freedom of movement of the British Army in South Armagh by hindering their patrols. The British Ministry of Defence issued a new type of body armour, which was both expensive (£4,000) and too heavy (14.5 kg or 32 lbs) for use on patrol. The British Army's official assessment on Operation Banner acknowledges that the sniper campaign "had an impact on morale among some troops and police officers". The morale of the troops was so low that some servicemen had to be disciplined for remaining in shelter while they were under orders to check vehicles. A British major said:

That meant that to some extent the IRA had succeeded in forcing troops off the ground and it made helicopters more vulnerable so we had to guard against using them too much.

The IRA strategy also diverted a large amount of British security resources from routine operations to tackle the threat. Until the 1994 ceasefire, even the SAS was unable to prevent the attacks. The IRA ceasefire between 1994 and 1996 made surveillance easier for the RUC and the British Army, leading to the success against the Caraher team. The security forces set the ground for an SAS ambush by deploying a decoy patrol, but the counter-sniper operation failed twice. In the end, the sniper squad was tracked to a farm complex and arrested there.

By the second IRA ceasefire, another team was still operational, and two Barrett rifles remained unaccounted for. The campaign is viewed as the most efficient and successful overall IRA operation in Northern Ireland for this period.

A Highway Code-style sign saying "SNIPER AT WORK" was mounted by the IRA near Crossmaglen and became an icon of the republican cause. Following the Good Friday Agreement, the "at work" caption inscribed on the sign has intermittently been covered with slogans such as "on hold", "job seeking" and variations thereof.

== See also ==
- Chronology of Provisional Irish Republican Army actions (1990–1999)
- Attack on Cloghogue checkpoint
- Operation Conservation
- Drummuckavall ambush
- Glasdrumman ambush
