= Occupation of Cullaville =

1993 IRA action in Northern Ireland

- Part of the Troubles
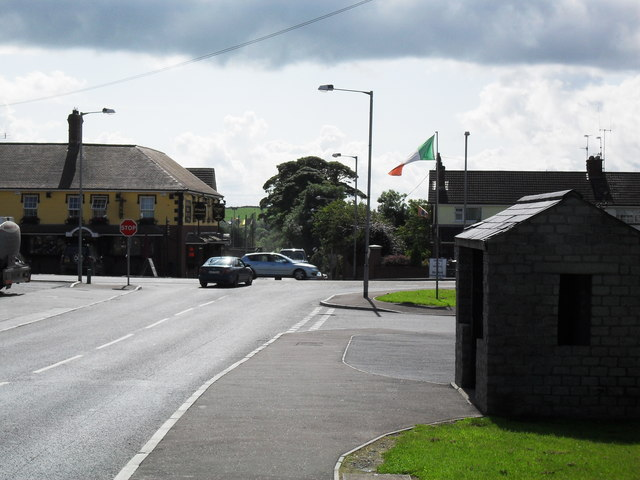

- Location: 54°03′43.20″N 6°38′38.12″W; Cullaville, County Armagh, Northern Ireland
- Date: 22 April 1993; 17:00 (UTC)
- Attack type: Armed occupation
- Weapons: Assault rifles, heavy machine guns, 1 sniper rifle, 1 rocket launcher
- Perpetrator: Provisional IRA

The occupation of Cullaville took place on 22 April 1993, when 12 armed members of the South Armagh Brigade of the Provisional Irish Republican Army (IRA) set up a checkpoint on the main crossroads of Cullaville, County Armagh, Northern Ireland, isolating the small village for a two-hour period, despite the presence of a British Army watchtower some yards away. The IRA men withdrew before the security forces in the area could react.

== Background ==
Since the mid-1970s, the British Army had ceased using roads in south County Armagh because of the threat of culvert mines and almost all military movement including minor and major operations, especially the resupply of security bases, had to be carried out by helicopter. In February 1974, up to 20 members of the Provisional IRA had briefly set up a checkpoint at Cullaville with the specific purpose of defusing a bomb planted by them eight days before in a local supermarket, that the Welsh Guards had failed to find earlier. British efforts to prevent illegal roadblocks in South Armagh were thwarted by the IRA during the 1981 Irish hunger strike, when a covert observation post was ambushed and a Royal Green Jackets soldier was killed. In 1984 the British Army began the building of 12 surveillance watchtowers along the border between County Armagh and County Louth in the Republic of Ireland, with the aim of hindering the IRA's freedom of movement. The airlift of materials and personnel involved was the largest airborne operation of the British Army since D day in World War II. A member of the IRA in South Armagh later told author Toby Harnden that the group had made a detailed study of the watchtowers' blind spots, and they had concluded that the outposts could surveil only 35 per cent of the area in good weather conditions. On 1 October 1992, 15 IRA members, armed with rifles and machine guns, set up a number of checkpoints around the south Armagh's village of Meigh without interference from British security forces.

== Cullaville action ==
On 22 April 1993, at approximately 17:00, a 12-man active service unit of the IRA mounted an armed checkpoint on the three-way crossroads in the centre of the village of Cullaville, effectively occupying the town. They started to stop drivers and ask them for identification. The IRA team was equipped with a number of small arms, AK-47 rifles, M60 machine guns, a Barret sniper rifle, a rocket launcher and a DShK heavy machine gun. They made good use of dead ground to conceal themselves from a British Army surveillance watchtower located barely 1 mile north of the village. The South Armagh IRA were noted for their ability to take advantage of the terrain. After two hours, the IRA left unmolested. According to some claims, the watchtower was unmanned at the time of the IRA operation. Other sources claim that the IRA intention was to lure British troops into an ambush. On this occasion, the IRA unit had no support from the southern side of the border.

== Aftermath ==
There was a bitter reaction from parliamentary circles in both London and Dublin. Seamus Mallon, then Westminster Member of Parliament for Newry and Armagh, described the incident as an example of the wrong approach of the British government to tackle the situation in Northern Ireland since 1921. He blamed the government emphasis on "emergency legislation" and "security intensity" for the "gap between the police and the community" which meant that "intelligence information is simply not there, despite what people will say." Michael Mates, then Minister of State at the Northern Ireland Office, questioned by Mallon about the inaction of the British Army, claimed that the terrain allowed the IRA team to hide from the watchtower, and that a come-on operation couldn't be ruled out. Bill Cotter, then Fine Gael member of the Labour Panel in the Seanad of Ireland, cited the incident to stress the increasing tension on both sides of the border. He remarked that "It is clear that private armies have the ability to take over any of our towns whenever they choose, but worse than that they have displayed their ability to wreak carnage of huge proportions. It is also clear that there is a hardening of attitudes in the North at this time". Cotter denounced the "dangerous complacency at Government level towards the question of national security at this time", and criticised a drop in Gardaí numbers as unwise. He also remarked the lack of a "partnership between local authorities and local communities" in border areas as foreseen in the 1985 Anglo-Irish Agreement.

== See also ==
- The Troubles in Cullaville
- South Armagh Sniper (1990–1997)
- Chronology of Provisional Irish Republican Army actions (1990–1999)
