= Provisional IRA South Armagh Brigade =

South Armagh Brigade
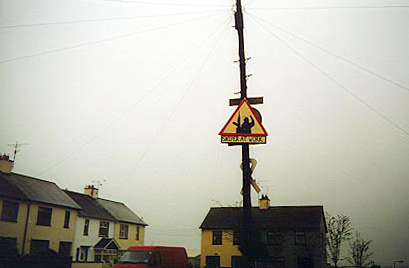
- The SNIPER AT WORK sign in South Armagh became a republican icon of the Troubles
- Active: December 1969 – July 1997
- Allegiance: Provisional Irish Republican Army
- Area of operations: South County Armagh, South County Down
- Engagements: 1970 RUC booby-trap bombing Forkhill land mine attack Tullyvallen massacre (claimed by South Armagh Republican Action Force); Drummuckavall Ambush; Kingsmill massacre (claimed by South Armagh Republican Action Force); Jonesborough Gazelle shooting 1978 Crossmaglen Ambush; Warrenpoint ambush Bessbrook landmine attack Glasdrumman ambush Newry mortar attack Aughanduff Lynx shootdown Jonesborough ambush Mayobridge landmine attack South Armagh sniper campaign Operation Conservation; Silverbridge Lynx shootdown Cloghogue checkpoint attack Forensic Science Laboratory bombing Occupation of Cullaville; Battle of Newry Road; Crossmaglen Lynx shootdown 1996 Docklands bombing

Commanders
- Notable commanders: Thomas Murphy (Brigade Commander); Peter Cleary (Staff Officer); Michael McVerry (1st Battalion Commander)

The South Armagh Brigade of the Provisional Irish Republican Army (IRA) operated during the Troubles in south County Armagh. It was organised into two battalions, one around Jonesborough and another around Crossmaglen. By the 1990s, the South Armagh Brigade was thought to consist of about 40 members, roughly half of them living south of the border. It has allegedly been commanded since the 1970s by Thomas 'Slab' Murphy who is also alleged to be a member of the IRA's Army Council. Compared to other brigades, the South Armagh IRA was seen as an 'independent republic' within the republican movement, retaining a battalion organizational structure and not adopting the cell structure the rest of the IRA was forced to adopt after repeated intelligence failures.

As well as paramilitary activity, the South Armagh Brigade has also been widely accused of smuggling across the Irish border. Between 1970 and 1997 the brigade was responsible for the deaths of at least 165 members of British security forces (123 British soldiers and 42 Royal Ulster Constabulary (RUC) officers). A further 75 civilians were killed in the area during the conflict, as well as ten South Armagh Brigade members. The RUC recorded 1,255 bombings and 1,158 shootings around a radius of ten miles from the geographic centre of South Armagh in the same period.

== Background ==
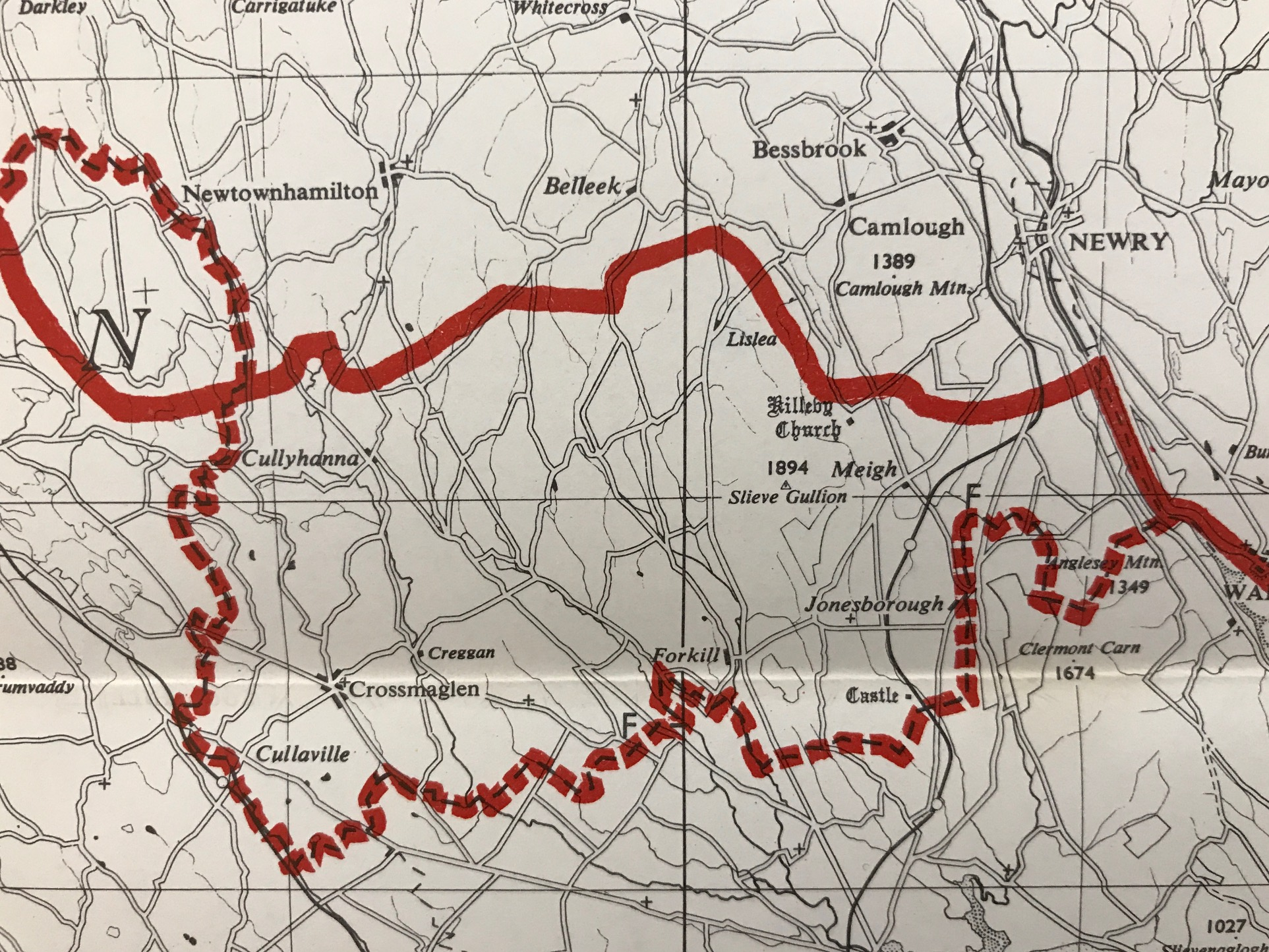
Map of South Armagh from the Irish Boundary Commission; due to its large Catholic population, it was considered to become part of the Irish Free State (solid red line as border), but in the end the border followed the old county boundary (dashed line).

South Armagh has a long Irish republican tradition. From 1919, Frank Thornton, Third Director of Operations in Michael Collins' Intelligence Staff, played a key role in organising IRA activities across South Armagh, Louth, Monaghan, Cavan, Longford and Down. Many men in the area served in the Fourth Northern Division of the Irish Republican Army during the Irish War of Independence (1919–21) and, unlike most of the rest of the Northern Ireland IRA, on the anti-Treaty side in the Irish Civil War (1922–23). Men from the area also took part in IRA campaigns in the 1940 and 1950s.

== 1970s ==
At the beginning of the Northern Ireland Troubles in August 1969, rioters, led by IRA men, attacked the RUC barracks in Crossmaglen, in retaliation for the attacks on Catholic/nationalist areas in Belfast in the Northern Ireland riots of August 1969. After the split in the IRA in that year, the South Armagh unit sided with the Provisional IRA rather than the Official IRA. The following August, two RUC constables were killed by a car bomb in Crossmaglen.

However, the IRA campaign in the area did not begin in earnest until 1971. On 7 August of that year, Harry Thornton, a 29-year-old sewage worker from South Armagh was shot and killed by the British Army while staying in a car outside Springfield Road base in Belfast, he and his coworker Arthur Murphy having been mistaken for gunmen. Murphy was lightly wounded and arrested by the RUC. The incident caused outrage among South Armagh residents, provided the IRA with many new recruits and created a hostile climate where local people were prepared to tolerate the killing of security force members. The soon-to-be South Armagh Brigade saw an afflux of hundreds of Volunteers, with the 3rd Battalion alone, operating between Drumintee and Keady, zones more distant from South Armagh's heartland of Crossmaglen, having more than 60 new volunteers in the days following Thornton's death.

During the early 1970s, the brigade was mostly engaged in ambushes of British Army patrols. In one such ambush in August 1972, a Ferret armoured car was destroyed by a 600 lb landmine, killing one soldier. There were also frequent gun attacks on foot patrols. Travelling overland in South Armagh eventually became so dangerous that the British Army began using helicopters to transport troops and supply its bases - a practice that had to be continued until the late 1990s. According to author Toby Harnden, the decision was taken shortly after a Saracen armoured vehicle was destroyed by a culvert bomb near Crossmaglen, on 9 October 1975. Subsequently, the British Army gave up the use of roads to the IRA in South Armagh. IRA volunteer Éamon McGuire, a former Aer Lingus senior engineer, and his team claim that they were responsible for getting the British Army "off the ground and into the air" in South Armagh. He was identified as the IRA's chief technical officer by the Central Intelligence Agency. Another noted IRA commander at that time was the commanding officer of the first battalion, Captain Michael McVerry. He was eventually killed during an attack on the RUC barracks in Keady in November 1973. Around this time IRA engineers in South Armagh pioneered the use of home-made mortars which were relatively inaccurate but highly destructive.

In 1975 and 1976, as sectarian violence increased in Northern Ireland, the South Armagh Republican Action Force, allegedly a cover-name for the South Armagh Brigade, carried out two attacks against Protestants. In September 1975 they attacked an Orange lodge in Newtownhamilton, killing five members of the lodge. Then, in January 1976, after a series of loyalist Ulster Volunteer Force (UVF) attacks on Catholic civilians in the border areas (including the Reavey and O'Dowd killings the previous day), the group shot and killed ten Protestant workmen in the "Kingsmill massacre" near Bessbrook. The workers' bus was stopped and the one Catholic worker taken aside before the others were killed. In response, the British government stated that it was dispatching the Special Air Service (SAS) to South Armagh, although the SAS had been present in the area for many years. While loyalist attacks on Catholics temporarily declined afterwards and many Protestants became more reluctant to help the UVF, the massacre caused considerable controversy in the republican movement.

By the end of the 1970s, the IRA in most of Northern Ireland had been restructured into a cell system. South Armagh, however, where the close rural community and family connections of IRA men diminished the risk of infiltration, retained its larger "battalion" structure. On 17 February 1978 the commander of the 2nd Battalion Royal Green Jackets, Lieutenant Colonel Ian Corden-Lloyd, was killed and two other soldiers injured when the Gazelle helicopter he was travelling in was attacked by an IRA unit near Jonesborough. At that moment, a gun battle was taking place on the ground between British soldiers and members of the South Armagh Brigade. The helicopter crashed while taking evasive manoeuvres after being fired at from the east side of Edenappa road. In August 1979, a South Armagh unit killed 18 soldiers in the Warrenpoint ambush. This was the biggest single loss of life inflicted on the British Army in its deployment in Northern Ireland (Operation Banner).

A number of South Armagh IRA members were imprisoned by the end of the 1970s and took part in the blanket protest and dirty protest in pursuit of political status for IRA prisoners. Raymond McCreesh, a South Armagh man, was among the ten republican hunger strikers who died for this goal in the 1981 hunger strike. The South Armagh Brigade retaliated for the deaths of the hunger strikers by killing five British soldiers with a mine that destroyed their armoured vehicle near Bessbrook.

== 1980s ==
During the mid-1980s, the brigade focused its attacks on the RUC, killing 20 of its members between 1984 and 1986. Nine of these were killed in the February 1985 Newry mortar attack. Three months later, a further four RUC officers were killed by a 900 lb roadside bomb at Killean, County Armagh.

In 1986, the British Army erected ten hilltop observation posts in South Armagh. These bases acted as information-gathering centres and also allowed the British Army to patrol South Armagh more securely. Between 1971 and the erection of the hilltop sites in the mid-1980s (the first in 1986), 84 members of the security forces were killed in the Crossmaglen and Forkhill areas by the IRA. After this, 24 security force personnel and Lord Justice Gibson and his wife were killed in the same areas, roughly a third of the previous yearly rate.

In March 1989, two senior RUC officers were killed in an ambush near Jonesborough. Chief Superintendent Harry Breen and Superintendent Bob Buchanan were returning from a meeting with the Garda Síochána in the Republic of Ireland, where they had been discussing a range of issues including ways of combating IRA attacks on the cross-border rail link, when they were ambushed. This incident was investigated by the Smithwick Tribunal into alleged collusion between the IRA and the Gardaí. As the divisional commander for South Armagh, Breen was the most senior policeman to have been killed during the Troubles.

South Armagh became the most heavily militarised area in Northern Ireland. In an area with a population of 23,000, the British Army stationed around 3,000 troops in support of the RUC to contain an unknown number of paramilitaries.

== 1990s ==
In the late 1980s and early 1990s, the IRA elsewhere in Northern Ireland found that nine out of ten planned operations were aborted. However, the South Armagh Brigade continued to carry out varied and high-profile attacks in the same period. By 1991, the RUC acknowledged that no mobile patrols had operated in South Armagh without Army support since 1975.

On 30 December 1990, Sinn Féin member and IRA volunteer, Fergal Caraher, was killed by Royal Marines near a checkpoint in Cullyhanna. His brother Michael Caraher, who was severely wounded in the shooting, later became the commander of one of the South Armagh sniper squads.

These squads were responsible for killing seven soldiers and two RUC members until the Caraher team was finally caught by the Special Air Service in April 1997. The South Armagh Brigade also built the bombs that were used to wreck economic targets in London during the 1990s, specially hitting the financial district. The truck bombs were sent to England by ferry. On 22 April 1993, the South Armagh IRA unit took control of the village of Cullaville near the border with the Republic, for two hours, making good use of dead ground. The fact that the IRA executed the action despite the presence of a British Army watchtower nearby, caused outrage among British and Irish parliamentary circles.

The South Armagh Brigade was by far the most effective IRA brigade in shooting down British helicopters during the conflict. They carried out 23 attacks on British Army helicopters during the Troubles, bringing five down on separate occasions: the Gazelle shot down in February 1978 near Jonesborough, a Lynx in June 1988, a second Lynx in February 1991. while in 1994 another Lynx and an RAF Puma were shot down in March and July respectively. The shooting down of the Lynx in 1994 during a mortar attack on Crossmaglen barracks is regarded by Toby Harnden as the most successful IRA operation against a helicopter in the course of the Troubles. A sustained machine gun attack against a helicopter was filmed by a Dublin television crew in March 1991 outside Crossmaglen Health Center. There was no reaction from British security although the RUC/Army base was just 50 yards away. The only successful IRA attack against an Army helicopter outside South Armagh was carried out by the East Tyrone Brigade near Clogher, County Tyrone, on 11 February 1990. By 1994, the only way for the British army to travel safely across South Armagh and some border areas of Tyrone and Fermanagh was on board troop-carrying Chinook helicopters.

=== Timeline: South Armagh sniper operations ===
- 16 March 1990 – First use of the Barrett M82 sniper rifle in Northern Ireland by the South Armagh Brigade sniper teams. A British soldier suffered minor head injures when a bullet pierced his helmet on Castleblaney Road, County Armagh.
- 27 August 1992 – An unsuccessful attack was launched by a sniper on a British Army patrol at Carran Road, Crossmaglen, County Armagh.
- **28 August 1992** – British soldier Paul Turner was shot dead by a sniper in the main square of Crossmaglen, County Armagh. He was taking up position in the main square of the town when he was hit in the chest by a single bullet fired by an IRA sniper some 250 yards away. He was the first person killed by one of the South Armagh sniper teams.
- **25 February 1993** – RUC officer Jonathan Reid was shot dead by a sniper while on joint British Army and RUC foot patrol in Crossmaglen, County Armagh. He was taking cover at the side of a road. When he stood up he was hit by a single bullet which struck him in the chest.
- **17 March 1993** – British soldier Lawrence Dickson was shot dead by a sniper in Forkhill, County Armagh. The patrol were in pursuit of a man who had been acting suspiciously when a single high velocity shot was fired by a sniper who is believed to have been in a nearby vehicle. The bullet hit the soldier in the side and he died a short time later. Another British soldier unsuccessfully returned fire.
- 3 April 1993 – A British soldier was shot and injured by the IRA near Crossmaglen, South Armagh.
- **26 June 1993** – British soldier John Randall was shot dead by an IRA sniper near Newtownhamilton, County Armagh. He had been patrolling a field when the sniper fired a single high-velocity shot from the back of a stationary vehicle which hit Randall in the stomach.
- **17 July 1993** – British soldier Kevin Pullin was shot dead by a sniper while on foot patrol, Carran Road, Crossmaglen, County Armagh.
- 31 July 1993 – A British Army mobile checkpoint was fired at by an IRA sniper at Newtownhamilton, County Armagh. The British patrol manning the checkpoint returned fire. There were no injuries on either side.
- **2 November 1993** – RUC officer Brian Woods died two days after being shot by an IRA sniper while at an RUC Vehicle Check Point (VCP), Upper Edward Street, Newry, County Down. A single shot hit him in the neck
- **2 December 1993** – British soldier Paul Garrett was shot dead by a sniper while on foot-patrol, Victoria Street, Keady, County Armagh. He was hit in the stomach by a single bullet fired from a nearby hill.
- **30 December 1993** – British soldier Daniel Blinco (22) Grenadier Guards was shot dead by an IRA sniper while on foot-patrol while passing Murtaghs Pub, North Street, Crossmaglen, County Armagh.
- 25 July 1994 – A British soldier was shot and wounded by the IRA in Crossmaglen, County Armagh.
- **12 February 1997** – A British soldier was shot dead by a sniper near the British Army base in Bessbrook, County Armagh. Lance Bombardier Stephen Restorick was the last British soldier to be killed in Northern Ireland during Operation Banner.
- 29 March 1997 – An RUC officer was badly wounded when he was shot by a sniper outside Forkhill joint security base, County Armagh. This was the last action of the IRA Armagh Sniper teams.
- 16 April 1997 – A group of sixteen undercover SAS members restrained four IRA members, part of one of the two sniper teams which operated in South Armagh and gave them to the RUC, after tracking the IRA men to a farm complex. The owner of the farm was also arrested.

Dates in bold indicate a death by a sniper.

== Ceasefires and the peace process ==
Borucki sangar, a British army outpost in Crossmaglen with a republican flag on top during an Ógra Shinn Féin protest some time before its removal in 2000

The IRA ceasefire of 1994 was a blow to the South Armagh Brigade, in that it allowed the security forces to operate openly in the area without fear of attack and to build intelligence on IRA members. When the IRA resumed its campaign in 1996-97, the South Armagh IRA was less active than previously, although one of the sniper teams killed one soldier and seriously wounded an RUC constable. But the snipers also lost a number of their most skilled members, such as Mícheál Caraher, who were arrested and imprisoned just weeks before the second ceasefire. The capture of the sniper team was the single major success for the security forces in South Armagh in more than a decade, and was arguably among the most important of the Troubles, but by then, the IRA and Sinn Féin had achieved huge political gains towards their long-term goals. The last major action of the brigade before the last IRA ceasefire was a mortar attack on Newtownhamilton RUC/Army barracks, on 12 July 1997. The single Mk-15 mortar bomb landed 40 yards (37 m) short of the perimeter fence beside the base helipad.

In 1997, several members of the South Armagh Brigade, based in Jonesborough and Dromintee, following Michael McKevitt, left the Provisional IRA because of its acceptance of the Mitchell Principles of non-violence at a General Army Convention in October of that year and formed a dissident grouping, the Real IRA, which rejected the peace process. Their discontent was deepened by Sinn Féin's endorsement of the Good Friday Agreement in 1998. Most of the South Armagh IRA stayed within the Provisional movement, but there were reports of the brigade aiding the dissidents in different actions before the signing of the agreement, among them the bombings of Moira and Portadown, and mortar attacks on a security base at Forkhill and a watchtower at Glassdrumman. The Omagh bombing of August 1998, a botched Real IRA operation which killed 29 civilians, was prepared by dissident republicans in South Armagh. Thomas Murphy and the leadership of the IRA in the area have allegedly since re-asserted their control, expelling dissidents from the district under threat of death. Michael McKevitt and his wife Bernadette were evicted from their home near Dundalk. IRA members in South Armagh ceased co-operating with the RIRA after the Omagh bombing.

After the Provisional IRA announced its intention to disarm and accept peaceful methods in July 2005, the British government announced a full demilitarisation plan which included the closing of all British Army bases in South Armagh by 2007. The normalisation process, negotiated under the provisions of the Good Friday Agreement in exchange for the complete decommissioning of IRA weaponry, was one of the main goals of the republican political strategy in the region.

Since the army wind-down in 2007, security in the area is the sole responsibility of the Police Service of Northern Ireland.

== Smuggling activities ==
Senior IRA figures in South Armagh, notably Thomas Murphy, are alleged to have been involved in large-scale smuggling across the Irish border and money-laundering. Other alleged illegal activities involve fraud through embezzlement of agricultural subsidies and false claims of property loss. In 2006, the British and Irish authorities mounted joint operations to clamp down on smuggling in the area and to seize Thomas Murphy's assets. On 22 June 1998 a deadly incident involving fuel smuggling took place near Crossmaglen, when former Thomas Murphy employee Patrick Belton ran over and killed a British soldier attempting to stop him while driving his oil tanker through a military checkpoint. Belton was shot and injured by other members of the patrol, but managed to flee to the Republic. He was later acquitted of any charges, but he eventually agreed in 2006 to pay €500,000 for cross-border smuggling. Some sources claim that the smuggling activities not only made the South Armagh brigade self-sustained, but also provided financial support to most of the IRA operations around Northern Ireland. The IRA control over the roads across the border in South Armagh enabled them to impose 'taxes' on every cross-border illegal enterprise.

== South Armagh Memorial Garden ==
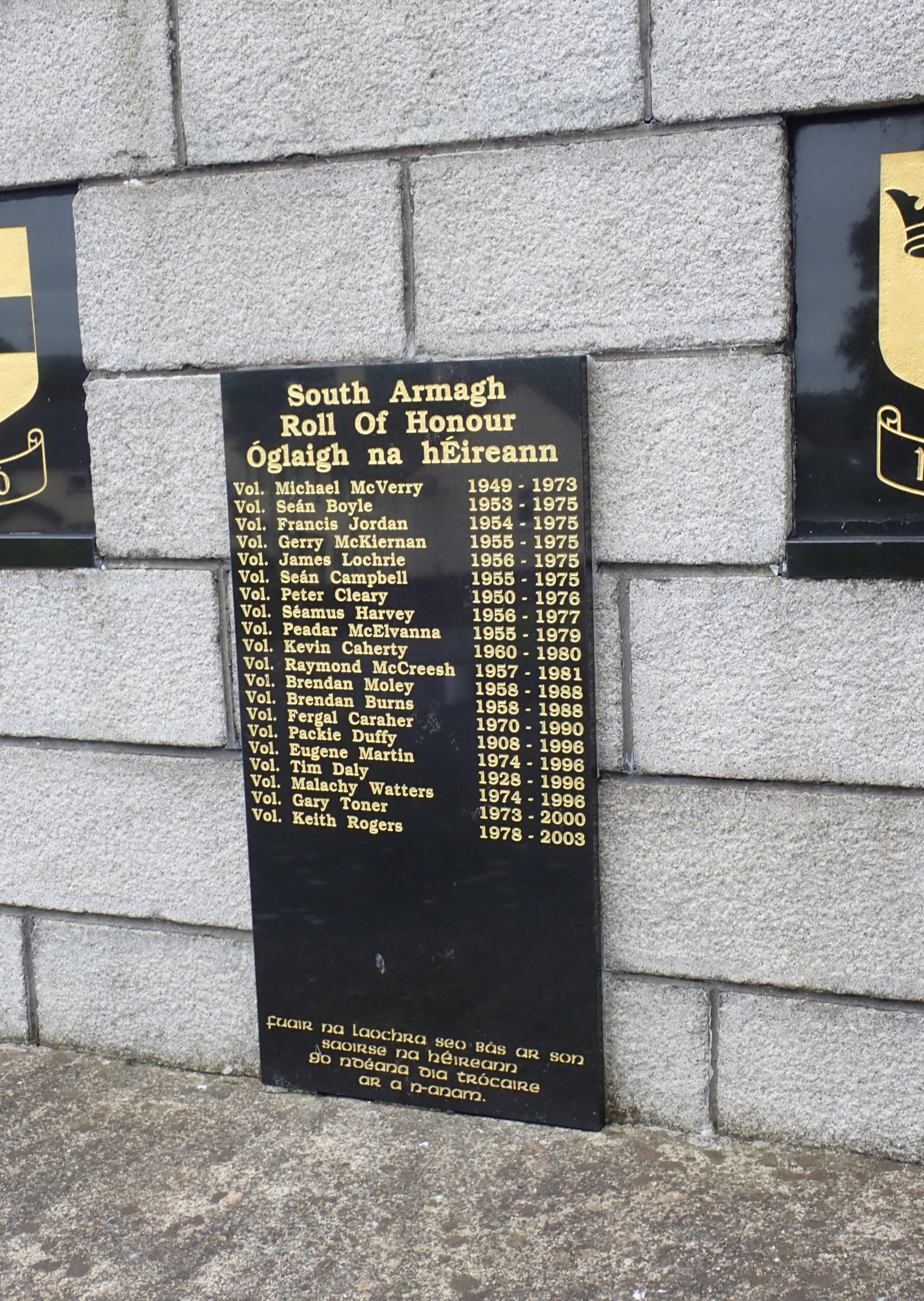
Memorial in Cullyhanna

A memorial garden was unveiled on 3 October 2010 in the village of Mullaghbawn, near Slieve Gullion mountain, with the names of 24 members of the South Armagh Brigade who died from different causes over the years inscribed upon a marble monument, along a bronze statue of Irish mythological hero Cú Chulainn. Martin McGuinness, then deputy First Minister of Northern Ireland, gave the main oration, while Conor Murphy, then Minister for Regional Development, introduced the families of the dead IRA members. The unveiling involved a large republican parade which failed to comply with the procedures of the Parades Commission. A Police Service of Northern Ireland spokesman confirmed that an investigation was underway, but also stated that both Sinn Féin Ministers and everyone attending the parade were unaware that "the proper paperwork hadn't been submitted". The monument serves as the venue for an annual South Armagh Brigade commemoration held each year in June.

== See also ==
- Provisional IRA campaign 1969-1997
- Provisional IRA East Tyrone Brigade
- Provisional IRA Belfast Brigade
- Provisional IRA Derry Brigade
