= Drummuckavall ambush =

1975 action by the Provisional IRA

Drummuckavall Ambush
- Part of The Troubles
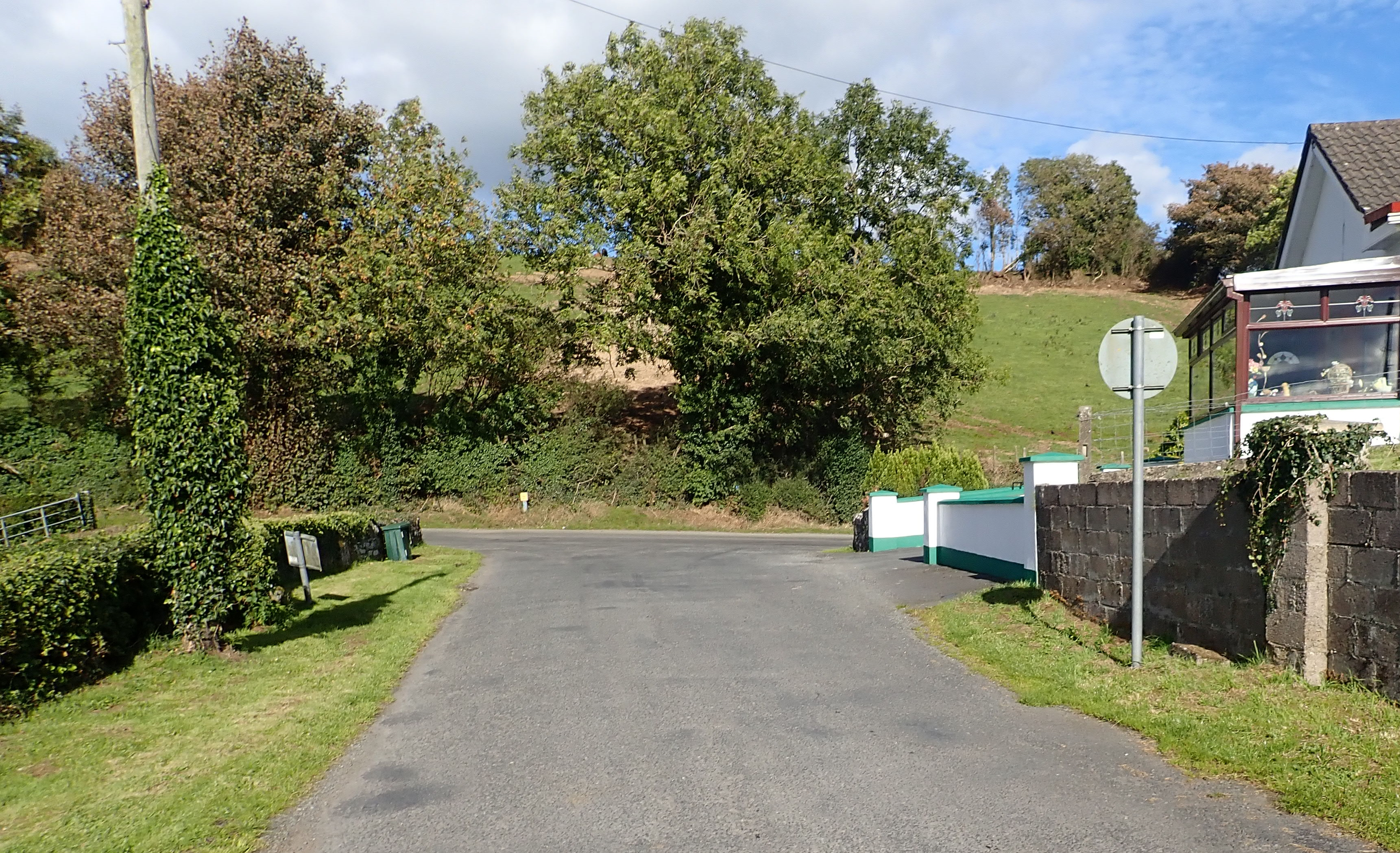
Date	22 November 1975
Location	Drummuckavall, County Armagh 54°3′6.71″N 6°34′11.48″W
Result	IRA victory: SAS deployed to Northern Ireland officially

Belligerents
United Kingdom	Provisional IRA

Commanders and leaders
(United Kingdom) LCpl. Paul Johnson	Unknown

Units involved
British Army	South Armagh Brigade

Strength
1 infantry section	12 IRA members

Casualties and losses
3 killed 1 wounded	None
- Location within Northern Ireland

The Drummuckavall ambush was an attack by the South Armagh Brigade of the Provisional Irish Republican Army (IRA) on a British Army observation post in Drummuckavall, southeast of Crossmaglen, County Armagh, on 22 November 1975. The attack, which occurred along the border with the Republic of Ireland, resulted in the deaths of three British soldiers and underlined the inefficiency of conventional military skills to deal with the situation in South Armagh, prompting the deployment of the Special Air Service (SAS) in this area.

== Background ==
During the mid-1970s, the most violent decade of the Troubles in Northern Ireland, the monitoring of the border between south County Armagh and the Republic of Ireland by the British Army was carried out from several static observation posts (OPs). The main goal of these OPs was to prevent attacks launched from beyond the border. These part-time manned positions were highly vulnerable to attack, as proved by a 1974 bomb attack which claimed the lives of two Royal Marines at the outpost of Drummuckavall, a townland 3 kilometers (1.9 mi) southeast of Crossmaglen close to the border.

It was not until 1986, when the first surveillance watchtowers were erected in operations Condor and Magistrate that the British Army tried to regain the initiative in the region from the IRA.

The intelligence and control over the area relied until then, and for a lapse of ten years, mostly on mobile posts comprising small uncovered infantry sections.

== The ambush ==
A section of four soldiers from the Royal Regiment of Fusiliers, coming from Crossmaglen, mounted an observation post at 2AM on 21 November 1975. The OP was on a slope at Drummuckavall behind bushes overlooking a small stream that ran along the border. Unknown to them, locals had spotted their position and informed the IRA. At 16:20 the next day, an IRA unit of up to 12 members attacked the OP. Heavy gunfire killed three of the Fusiliers and disabled their communications equipment. A later inquest found that the IRA unit had fired from two positions inside the Republic. Those killed were James Duncan (19), Peter McDonald (19), and Michael Sampson (20). The only fusilier on guard duty was McDonald, who was manning a light machine gun. The other soldiers were resting or taking a meal. The lance corporal in charge of the party, Paul Johnson, survived the first burst unscathed. He remained flat on the ground but was seriously injured on the wrist, side and back by a second burst of automatic fire after the IRA unit called on him to surrender. A second call to surrender was made, followed by more gunfire. The IRA unit then withdrew across the border. According to Johnson, they were shouting "Up the 'RA!" and laughing. Johnson managed to slip away by crawling 25 yards towards a nearby road, where British troops eventually airlifted him to safety in a helicopter.

One of the AR-15 rifles used in the attack was found to have been used by the South Armagh Republican Action Force in an attack on the Tullyvallen Orange Hall that killed five civilians.

== Aftermath ==
Shortly after the attack, Merlyn Rees, then Secretary of State for Northern Ireland, issued a famous statement dubbing South Armagh Bandit Country. The next year, the British Government declared it was deploying the Special Air Service (SAS) in Northern Ireland, although they had already been deployed unofficially for a number of years. The secretive and undercover nature of this elite force meant they were considered the best choice to infiltrate the South Armagh area, after the official report on the action exposed several flaws in the layout of the OP.

As a complement to the SAS operations, the British Army also changed tactics. Major General Dick Trant established small teams of troops, called COPs (close observation platoons), to gather information, often in plain clothes or camouflaged in the landscape. They were also able to set up ambushes, however were sometimes overcome and ambushed by the IRA themselves, like the Glasdrumman ambush in 1981 and Operation Conservation in 1990.

== See also ==
- Attack on Cloghoge checkpoint
- Attack on Derryard checkpoint
- Glasdrumman ambush
- Operation Conservation
- Timeline of Provisional Irish Republican Army actions
