= Glasdrumman ambush =

1981 IRA ambush in Northern Ireland

- Part of the Troubles
Date	17 July 1981
Location	Glasdrumman, County Armagh 54°3′26.76″N 6°31′37.84″W
Result	IRA victory

Belligerents
Provisional IRA	United Kingdom: British Army

Commanders and leaders
Unknown	Lance Corporal Gavin Dean †

Strength
Up to 7 IRA members	18 soldiers

Casualties and losses
None	1 killed 1 wounded
- Location within Northern Ireland

The Glasdrumman ambush was an attack by the South Armagh Brigade of the Provisional Irish Republican Army (IRA) against a British Army observation post in Glasdrumman, County Armagh on 17 July 1981. An attempted ambush by the British Army on IRA members at a scrapyard southwest of Crossmaglen was itself ambushed, resulting in the death of one British soldier and the IRA retaining the ability to set up checkpoints in South Armagh.

== Background ==
The crisis triggered by the 1981 Irish hunger strike of Provisional Irish Republican Army (IRA) and Irish National Liberation Army (INLA) prisoners led to an increase in militant Irish republican activity in Northern Ireland. British intelligence reports unveiled IRA intentions of mounting illegal checkpoints and hijacking vehicles on the IRA-controlled roads in South County Armagh, near the Irish border. To counter it, the British Army deployed the so-called "close observation platoons" (COPs) - small infantry sections acting as undercover units to counter IRA activity, a tactic introduced by Major General Richard Trant in 1977.

On 6 May 1981, a day after the death of hunger-striker Bobby Sands, one IRA member from a three-man unit was arrested while trying to set up a roadblock east of the main Belfast-Dublin road by 12 members of the Royal Green Jackets, who had been divided into three teams. A second volunteer crossed the border, only to be arrested by the Irish Army. The third IRA man escaped, apparently injured. A total of 689 rounds had been fired by the soldiers.

== Ambush ==
After this initial success, the British Army continued these tactics. On 16 July, another operation was carried out by 18 Royal Green Jackets soldiers. That night, four concealed positions – Alpha, Bravo, Charlie and Delta – were inserted into the Glassdrumman area, southwest of Crossmaglen in South Armagh, around a scrapyard along the border. The plan was that another unit – called the triggering team – would ambush any IRA unit on sight, while the other four would block the expected escape routes. On 17 July, the commanders in charge of Alpha and Delta teams, suspecting that the operation had been compromised by the presence of local civilians, ordered the withdrawal of their men. Shortly thereafter, Bravo team was suddenly engaged by automatic fire from an M60 machine gun and AR-15 rifles fired by six or seven IRA members. The concealed position, emplaced inside a derelict van, was riddled by more than 250 bullets. The team's leader, Lance Corporal Gavin Dean, was killed instantly and one of his men, Rifleman John Moore, was seriously wounded. Moore was later awarded the Military Medal. The IRA members fired their weapons from across the border, 160 yards (150 m) away.

== Aftermath ==
The British Army's follow up investigation concluded that Dean's team had been seen on the first day, allowing the IRA to carry out detailed reconnaissance of the area and to select a firing position for their ambush.

British army commanders concluded that "it was not worth risking the lives of soldiers to prevent an IRA roadblock being set up." The incident also exposed the difficulties of concealing operations from local civilians in South Armagh, a region of Northern Ireland heavily sympathetic to the IRA. Several years later, the IRA in South Armagh repeated its success against undercover British observation posts in the course of Operation Conservation in 1990.

== See also ==
- Attack on Cloghogue checkpoint
- Drummuckavall Ambush
- Occupation of Cullaville
- Operation Conservation
- Timeline of Provisional Irish Republican Army actions
