= Operation Conservation =

British Army gun battle with the IRA in 1990

- Part of The Troubles and Operation Banner
- A British Army position near Cullyhanna in the aftermath of the operation, 7 May 1990
Date	6 May 1990
Location	Cullyhanna, County Armagh 54°7′55.72″N 6°34′57.10″W
Result	IRA victory

Belligerents
Provisional IRA	United Kingdom: British Army

Commanders and leaders
Unknown	Lance Sergeant; Graham Stewart †

Strength
1 ASU	1 Infantry section

Casualties and losses
None	1 killed
- Location within Northern Ireland

Operation Conservation was an attempt by the British Army to ambush a large Provisional Irish Republican Army (IRA) unit along the Dorsey Enclosure, between Cullyhanna and Silverbridge, in south County Armagh. The action took place on 6 May 1990 but was thwarted by the South Armagh Brigade of the IRA.

== British plan ==
The British Army, in the hope of luring a large IRA active service unit into attacking an entrenched Light Infantry unit, deployed its troops around the route between Cullyhanna and Silverbridge. A machine-gun ambush had taken place on another Light Infantry patrol on 28 April near the same area. More than 180 rounds were fired and a soldier was wounded in the leg. The main position was to be surrounded and watched by 16 concealed sections belonging to the 2nd Battalion Scots Guards. The goal was to surprise and kill any IRA unit attempting to penetrate the area.

== The action ==
The troops were inserted into the zone in the early hours of 3 May. The South Armagh Brigade of the IRA watched these movements and was able to spot several of the hidden observation posts (OPs). Eventually, they decided to attack one of the British positions at Slatequarry, near Cullyhanna, which was the most exposed. According to the writer David McKittrick, the British soldiers were lured to an open field after seeing smoke coming from the chimney of a derelict building.

Just after midnight on the night of 5/6 May, the exposed British position began to receive machine-gun fire from an IRA unit emplaced on the slope of a nearby hill some 400 yards away. The IRA members had built firing positions with stones around an abandoned house, and concealed them with green military veils. The OP was fired on by two 7.62 mm General purpose machine guns (GPMGs) and a Heckler & Koch G3 rifle; the latter used to cover the retirement of the machine-gun crews towards Slatequarry road, where a vehicle was waiting to pick them up. A bomb was planted between the OP and the road to prevent any attempt to give chase. The shooting lasted some 90 seconds and 316 rounds were exchanged by the two sides, 188 by the IRA and 128 by the Scots Guards. The patrol commander Lance Sergeant Graham Stewart was hit and died of wounds the following day.

== Aftermath ==
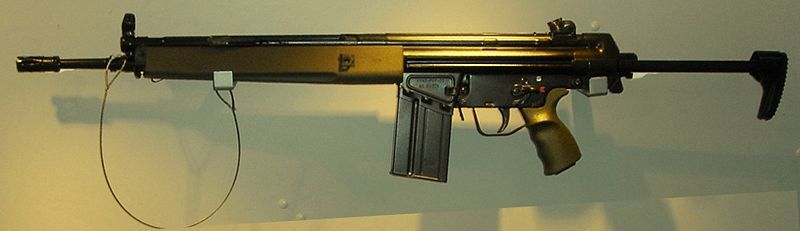
H&K G3, the type of rifle used by the IRA team to cover its withdrawal

The counter-ambush defeated the British operation and the officer in charge cancelled it. He later stated that

In military terms, it was one of the IRA's finest attacks in South Armagh. They picked out the COP team in the most exposed position. With hindsight, it was the one weak link in the operation and it says something for the IRA's tactical and field skills that they identified that fact before we did.

After the incident, another British senior officer said that a skilful machine-gun crew was operating near Cullyhanna. On 20 September, another soldier was hit and severely wounded in that area by machine-gun fire during an attack on a 1st Cheshire Regiment patrol at Drumalt. On 26 September there was another casualty when a helicopter was hit as it landed at Newtownhamilton and a soldier was wounded in the abdomen. The IRA unit responsible for the ambushes was nicknamed the "Cullyhanna Gun Club" by the British army. The writer Toby Harnden said that the IRA show of force proved again that they could dispute the ground to the troops everywhere in South Armagh due to its better knowledge of the terrain and good camouflage.

Stewart was 24 when he died. He was buried with full military honours in his home town of Perth, Scotland on 11 May 1990.

== See also ==
- Chronology of Provisional Irish Republican Army actions (1990–1999)
- South Armagh Sniper (1990–1997)
- Attack on Cloghogue checkpoint
- Battle of Newry Road
- Glasdrumman ambush
