= Charles Bennett =

Charles Bennett or Bennet may refer to:

== Peers ==
- Charles Bennet, 1st Earl of Tankerville (1674–1722), British peer
- Charles Bennet, 2nd Earl of Tankerville (1697–1753), British peer and politician
- Charles Bennet, 3rd Earl of Tankerville (1716–1767), British peer and politician
- Charles Bennet, 4th Earl of Tankerville (1743–1822), cricket pioneer
- Charles Bennet, 5th Earl of Tankerville (1776–1859), British politician
- Charles Bennet, 6th Earl of Tankerville (1810–1899), British peer and Conservative politician

== Politicians ==
- Charles Bennett (Australian politician) (1894–1968), member of the New South Wales Legislative Assembly
- Charles Bennett (high commissioner) (1913–1998), New Zealand soldier and public servant
- Charles E. Bennett (politician) (1910–2003), American congressman
- Charles Fox Bennett (1793–1883), merchant and politician in Newfoundland
- Charles G. Bennett (1863–1914), American congressman and secretary of the Senate

== Sportspeople ==
- Charles Bennett (athlete) (1870–1949), British track and field athlete
- Charles Bennett (cricketer) (1872–1921), English cricketer
- Charles Bennett (defensive end, born 1963), American football defensive end
- Charles Bennett (defensive end, born 1983), American football defensive end
- Charles Bennett (fighter) (born 1979), known as "Krazy Horse", mixed martial arts fighter
- Charles Bennett (footballer) (1882–?), English footballer
- Charlie Bennett (1854–1927), American baseball player
- Chuck Bennett (1907–1973), American football halfback and coach

== Scientists and academics ==
- Charles E. Bennett (scholar) (1858–1921), American classical scholar
- Charles H. Bennett (physicist) (born 1943), American physicist and information theorist
- Charles L. Bennett (born 1956), American astrophysicist

== Other people ==
- Charles Bennett (actor) (1889–1943), American actor
- Charles Bennett (screenwriter) (1899–1995), English playwright and screenwriter
- Charles Alan Bennett (1877–1943), British barrister and judge
- Charles H. Bennett (illustrator) (1829–1867), Victorian illustrator who pioneered techniques in comic illustration
- Charles H. Bennett (soldier) (1811–1855), present at start of California Gold Rush
- Charles Harper Bennett (1840–1927), English photographer and inventor
- Charles Henry Allan Bennett (1872–1923), English Buddhist monk
- Charles Peto Bennett (1856–1940), English timber merchant
- Charles Bennett (c. 1977–1999), Irish murder victim, see murder of Charles Bennett

== See also ==
- Bennett (name)
- Chuck Bennett (politician) (born 1948), mayor of Salem, Oregon
