= Chronology of Provisional Irish Republican Army actions in the 21st century =

This is a chronology of activities by the Provisional Irish Republican Army, an Irish republican paramilitary group in the 21st century.

== 2000 ==
- 16 March 2000: an IRA engineer defused a bomb left outside the offices of dissident republican party Republican Sinn Féin on the Falls Road, Belfast.
- April 2000: an IRA active service unit was intercepted by the Garda Síochána in Dublin and two members were arrested. The unit is believed to have been on its way to kill Dublin drug lord Martin Foley.
- 30 April 2000: Drug dealer Thomas Byrne was shot dead in central Dublin, by the IRA.
- 29 May 2000: Edmund McCoy died several hours after being shot at the Motte 'n' Bailey Bar, Kingsway, Dunmurry, County Antrim. He was reportedly a suspected drug dealer. The Royal Ulster Constabulary blamed the IRA for the killing.
- 29 September 2000: Patrick Quinn was shot dead in The Depot Bar, Union Street, Magherafelt, County Londonderry. Quinn was reportedly a suspected drug dealer and was shot shortly after the IRA had ordered him to leave the area.
- 13 October 2000: Real IRA member Joseph O'Connor was shot dead while sitting in his car in the Ballymurphy area of Belfast, during a republican dispute. The Provisional IRA is believed responsible.

== 2001 ==
- 7 January 2001: the IRA was blamed for carrying out a punishment beating on a convicted criminal in Ballymurphy, Belfast.
- 21 April 2001: Christopher O'Kane, reportedly a suspected drug dealer, was shot dead near his home, Milldale Crescent, Tullyally, Derry, by four gunmen. It is believed that the IRA was responsible.
- 14 July 2001: gangland figure Seamus "Shavo" Hogan is gunned down in Crumlin, Dublin, reportedly by the IRA.

== 2002 ==
- 2 June 2002: IRA members opened fire during unrest in the Short Strand area of Belfast, injuring two teenagers and a loyalist youth worker, who was seriously injured. The following night republican gunmen shot two more Protestants. Loyalist paramilitaries opened fire on republicans and PSNI officers, and police shot and injured a loyalist. Two days before the initial shootings UDA members armed with firearms, petrol bombs and blast bombs attacked Catholic homes at the peaceline and opened fire on police.
- 8 September 2002: the IRA was blamed for carrying out a punishment beating on a South Armagh man.
- 11 October 2002: a five-man IRA unit was captured by Gardaí in Bray, County Wicklow. It is believed the unit, members of the Dublin Brigade, were on their way to carry out an armed hijacking. The men were in a small van dressed in Garda uniforms, and had stun-guns and CS gas.

== 2003 ==
- 12 March 2003: Irish republican Keith Rogers was shot dead in Cullaville, South Armagh, during a shootout involving a number of feuding IRA members, according to police. The IRA claimed Rogers had been shot while confronting local criminals.
- 11 October 2003: The IRA were allegedly responsible for the kidnapping of a dissident republican, Brendan Rice, in Newcastle, County Down; Rice was later released.

== 2004 ==
- 19 January 2004: A dissident republican who was shot in the ankles in a punishment shooting blamed the Provisional IRA for the attack. The man from west Belfast was a member of an organisation which provided support to the families of imprisoned Real IRA (RIRA) members .
- 20 February 2004: The IRA were accused of being responsible for the kidnap and attempted murder of ex-Irish National Liberation Army (INLA) member Bobby Tohill. The van in which he was being transported was rammed by police and four men were arrested. The IRA stated that it had not authorised any action against the man in question. Tohill required 93 stitches following the ordeal and went into hiding.

== 2005 ==
- 30 January 2005: Robert McCartney is stabbed to death in a fight with IRA members being involved. Initially Sinn Féin denied IRA involvement but later it suspended 7 Sinn Féin members who had been present and the IRA also cleared witnesses to co-operate with the police investigation. McCartney's family claim they have been intimidated by the IRA.
- 2 February 2005: The IRA issued a statement summarizing their "ambitious initiatives designed to develop or save the peace process", including three occasions in which they had complied with the Independent International Commission on Decommissioning in putting weapons beyond use. The statement went on to say, "At this time it appears that the two governments are intent on changing the basis of the peace process. They claim that 'the obstacle now to a lasting and durable settlement… is the continuing terrorist and criminal activity of the IRA'. We reject this. It also belies the fact that a possible agreement last December was squandered by both governments pandering to rejectionist unionism instead of upholding their own commitments and honouring their own obligations." The statement concluded with two points: "We are taking all our proposals off the table" and "It is our intention to closely monitor ongoing developments and to protect to the best of our ability the rights of republicans and our support base".
- 3 February 2005: Following statements from the British and Irish governments, claiming that the new IRA statement was no cause for alarm, the IRA issues a second two-sentence statement: "The two governments are trying to play down the importance of our statement because they are making a mess of the peace process. Do not underestimate the seriousness of the situation".
- 10 February 2005: The Independent Monitoring Commission reported that it firmly supports the Police Service of Northern Ireland and Garda assessments that the IRA was responsible for the Northern Bank robbery and recommends financial and political sanctions against Sinn Féin.
- 6 April 2005: Sinn Féin leader Gerry Adams calls on the IRA to initiate consultations "as quickly as possible" to move from being a paramilitary organisation to one committed to purely non-military methods.
- 12 April 2005: A Dublin man, Joseph Rafferty, was shot and killed in a shotgun attack in Dublin. The IMC and the family of the deceased have claimed that the IRA were responsible. The IRA has denied any involvement.
- May 2005: The IRA is believed to have been responsible for intimidating a family to leave their home in Belfast.
- 24 May 2005: The Independent Monitoring Commission claimed the IRA were still recruiting and training new members, and it was still involved in paramilitary and criminal activity.
- July 2005: The IMC blamed the IRA for a punishment shooting of an alleged criminal in early July.
- 28 July 2005: The IRA release a statement that it is ending its armed campaign and will verifiably put its arms beyond use.
- 26 September 2005: International weapons inspectors issue a statement confirming the full decommissioning of the IRA's weaponry.

== 2006 – 2009 ==
IRA Colour Party in Dublin – 2009

- 10 March 2006: The IMC claimed that members of the IRA were responsible for the hijacking of a lorry containing a consignment of spirits in County Meath.
- 20 October 2007: Paul Quinn, a 21-year-old lorry driver from Cullyhanna in south Armagh, was lured to a farm near Oram, County Monaghan, where he and a friend were ambushed and separated. Quinn was taken to a shed where a group of IRA members beat him with iron bars and nail-studded clubs for half an hour. The assault broke nearly every major bone in his body. Gardaí later found Quinn, barely conscious, and he was taken to hospital in Drogheda where he died. The attack was allegedly revenge for verbal and physical clashes between Quinn and relatives of prominent IRA members in the area and had been sanctioned by the commander of the Provisional IRA South Armagh Brigade and the IRA's Chief of Staff who was based in the region.
- 31 July 2008: The 32 County Sovereignty Movement (often considered the political arm of the Real IRA), accused the IRA of assaulting one of their members in Derry, leaving the man with serious head and facial injuries.

== 2010s ==
- 9 February 2010: A representative of the IRA using the pseudonym "P. O'Neill" issued a statement confirming that Belfast man Joe Lynskey was "executed" by the organisation in 1972. The statement said that the man had been an IRA member and was "court-martialled for breaches of IRA standing orders" and "was subsequently executed and buried in an unmarked grave." The statement went on to say that Lynskey had an affair with the wife of a Belfast republican and had ordered another IRA member to shoot the man. The IRA said it had not identified Lynskey's grave.
- August 2010: The 32 County Sovereignty Movement, the Republican Network for Unity and the Ulster Political Research Group (UPRG), claimed that the IRA were responsible for a shooting incident in Gobnascale, Derry. It is claimed that up to 20 masked men, some armed with handguns, attacked a group of teenagers who were engaging in anti-social behaviour at an interface area. A number of the teenagers were attacked and shots were fired into the air. The men are then reported to have removed their masks when the Police Service of Northern Ireland (PSNI) arrived and were subsequently identified as members of the Republican Movement. Sinn Féin denied the IRA were involved.
- 2 July 2011: An alleged member of the Provisional IRA was arrested for questioning over the stabbing of a man suspected of being linked to dissident republicans in the Markets area of Belfast.
- 14 February 2013: Former IRA volunteer Sean Kelly was arrested over the punishment shooting of an 18-year-old man in Belfast. He was later released unconditionally. Jim Allister suggested the IRA was involved in the shooting while the Ulster Unionist Party claimed the PSNI had come under pressure to distance mainstream republicans from the attack.
- 26 August 2013: It was alleged that the IRA were responsible for planting two mortars along the border in South Armagh. Gardaí claimed the primed devices were intended as a warning by the IRA to the PSNI to cease disrupting the Provisional IRA's smuggling and diesel laundering business along the border.
- 12 August 2015: Police believe members of the IRA were involved in the fatal shooting of former IRA volunteer Kevin McGuigan in East Belfast. The shooting appears to be a revenge killing for the murder of another republican veteran in Belfast four months earlier.
- 19 October 2015: The Assessment on Paramilitary Groups in Northern Ireland, commissioned by the Secretary of State for Northern Ireland on the structure, role and purpose of paramilitary organisations reported the structures of the IRA remain in existence in a much reduced form", including "a senior leadership, the 'Provisional Army Council' and some 'departments'", but that they are not recruiting members. It concluded that the IRA still has access to some weapons, but have not sought to procure more since at least 2011. It also said that IRA members believe the Army Council oversees both the IRA and Sinn Féin.

== See also ==
- Timeline of Continuity Irish Republican Army actions
- Timeline of Real Irish Republican Army actions
- Timeline of Irish National Liberation Army actions
- Timeline of Ulster Volunteer Force actions
- Timeline of Ulster Defence Association actions
- Timeline of the Northern Ireland Troubles
