= Caraher =

Caraher is a surname. Notable people with the surname include:

- Ben Caraher (1938–2018), politician in Northern Ireland
- Fergal Caraher (1970–1990), Provisional IRA volunteer and Sinn Féin member
- Kim Caraher (died 2007), Australian author
- Maria Caraher (born 1968 or 1969), Irish republican activist, school principal and former politician
