= Murder of Charles Bennett =

Irish murder victim

Charles Bennett (c. 1977 – 30 July 1999) was an Irish murder victim.

A native of North Belfast and a taxi driver, Charles Bennett was twenty-two. On the final night of his life, he answered a call at his front door, and went outside with the callers. His body was found in the car park of St. Gall's GAA club, Fall's Road. He had been so badly mutilated that he was not immediately recognised. He had been gagged and bound, then shot in the head.

His death had implications for the ongoing Northern Ireland peace process, as a commentator questioned the validity of the IRA ceasefire.

In 2007 the Bennett family called for his name to be cleared, "after suffering an eight-year campaign of intimidation by people who have taunted them over unfounded allegations that 22-year-old Charles Bennett was a 'tout'. They claim the harassment has led to one member of the family taking his own life in 2003 and to others being attacked." the family went on to say Bennett had never been a member of any paramilitary organisation .

== See also ==
- Andrew Kearney
- Murder of Paul Quinn
- Murder of Joseph Rafferty
