= Silke =

Silke may refer to:

- Silke (actress) a Spanish actress known by her mononym
- Silke (given name)
- Silke (surname)
- Silke, fictional character Samuel Silke in Daredevil comics
- Silke, novel by Lacey Dancer
- Silke, comic series published by Dark Horse Comics

== See also ==
- Silkie
