= Paramilitary punishment attacks in Northern Ireland =

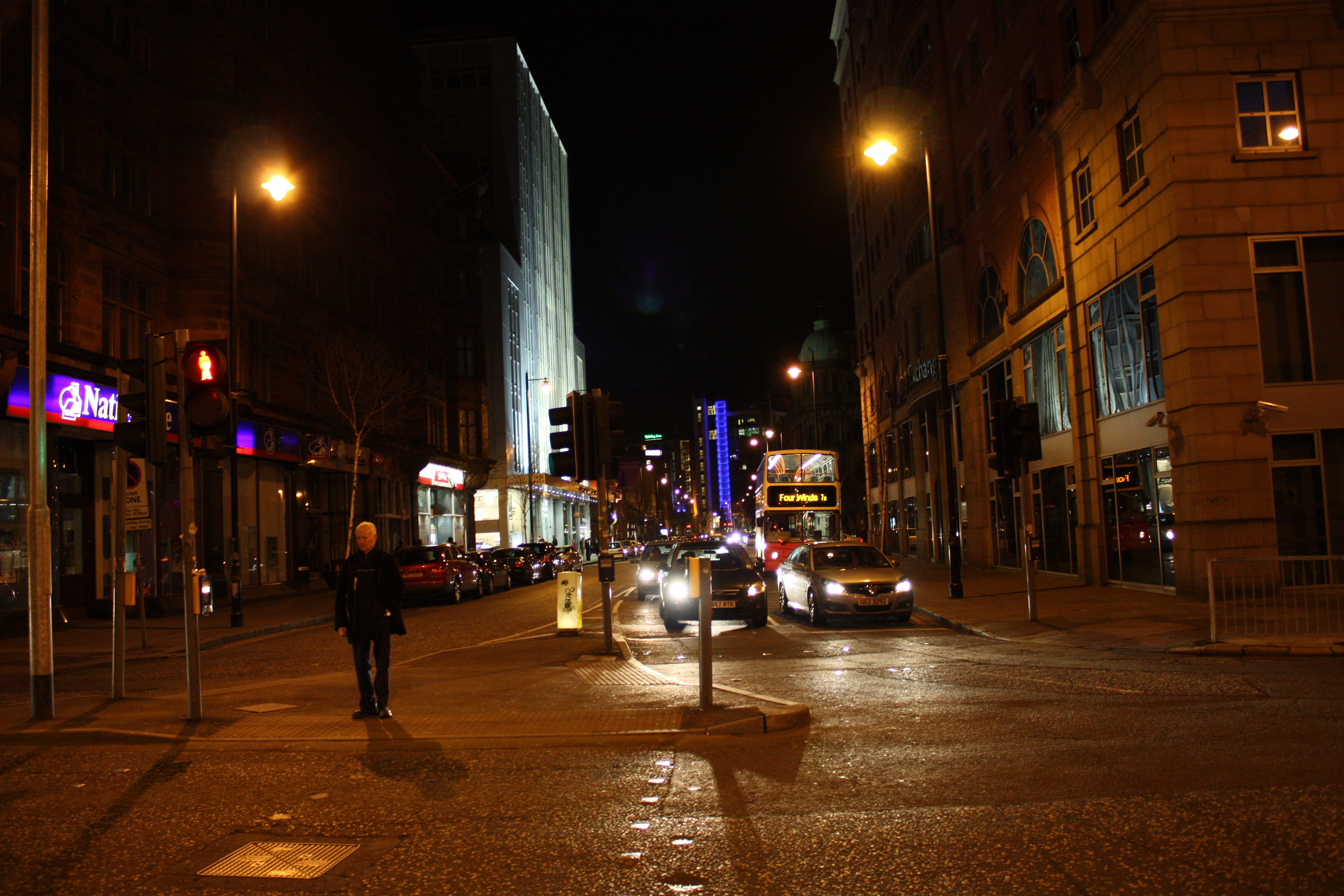
Many of the attacks have taken place in Belfast at night.

Since the early 1970s, extrajudicial punishment attacks have been carried out by Ulster loyalist and Irish republican paramilitary groups in Northern Ireland. Attacks can range from a warning or expulsion from Northern Ireland, backed up by the threat of violence, to severe beatings that leave victims in hospital and shootings in the limbs (such as kneecapping). The cause of the attacks is disputed; proposed explanations include the breakdown of order as a result of the Northern Ireland conflict (c. 1970–1998), ideological opposition to British law enforcement (in the case of republicans), and the ineffectiveness of police in preventing crime.

Since reporting began in 1973, more than 6,106 shootings and beatings have been reported to the police, leading to at least 115 deaths. The official figures are an underestimate because many attacks are not reported. Most victims are young men and boys under the age of thirty, whom their attackers claim are responsible for criminal or antisocial behaviour. Despite attempts to put an end to the practice, according to researcher Sharon Mallon in a 2017 policy briefing, "paramilitaries are continuing to operate an informal criminal justice system, with a degree of political and legal impunity".

== Name ==
Although local residents of affected neighbourhoods call the attacks "punishment", this term is controversial. According to historian Liam Kennedy, "Not only has the label 'punishment' a euphemistic quality when applied to extremely cruel practices, it also carries a presumption that the victim is somehow deserving of what he (occasionally she) receives." In a 2001 debate in the Northern Ireland Assembly, Alliance MLA Eileen Bell objected to the term "punishment beatings", stating: "The use of the term 'punishment' confers on the act a degree of legitimacy by suggesting that the guilt of a victim is an established fact." According to the Independent Monitoring Commission, the term "punishment beating" "lends a spurious respectability to the perpetrators, as if they were entitled to take the law into their own hands". Other terms used to describe the attacks are "paramilitary-style attacks", "paramilitary policing", and "paramilitary vigilantism".

== Background ==
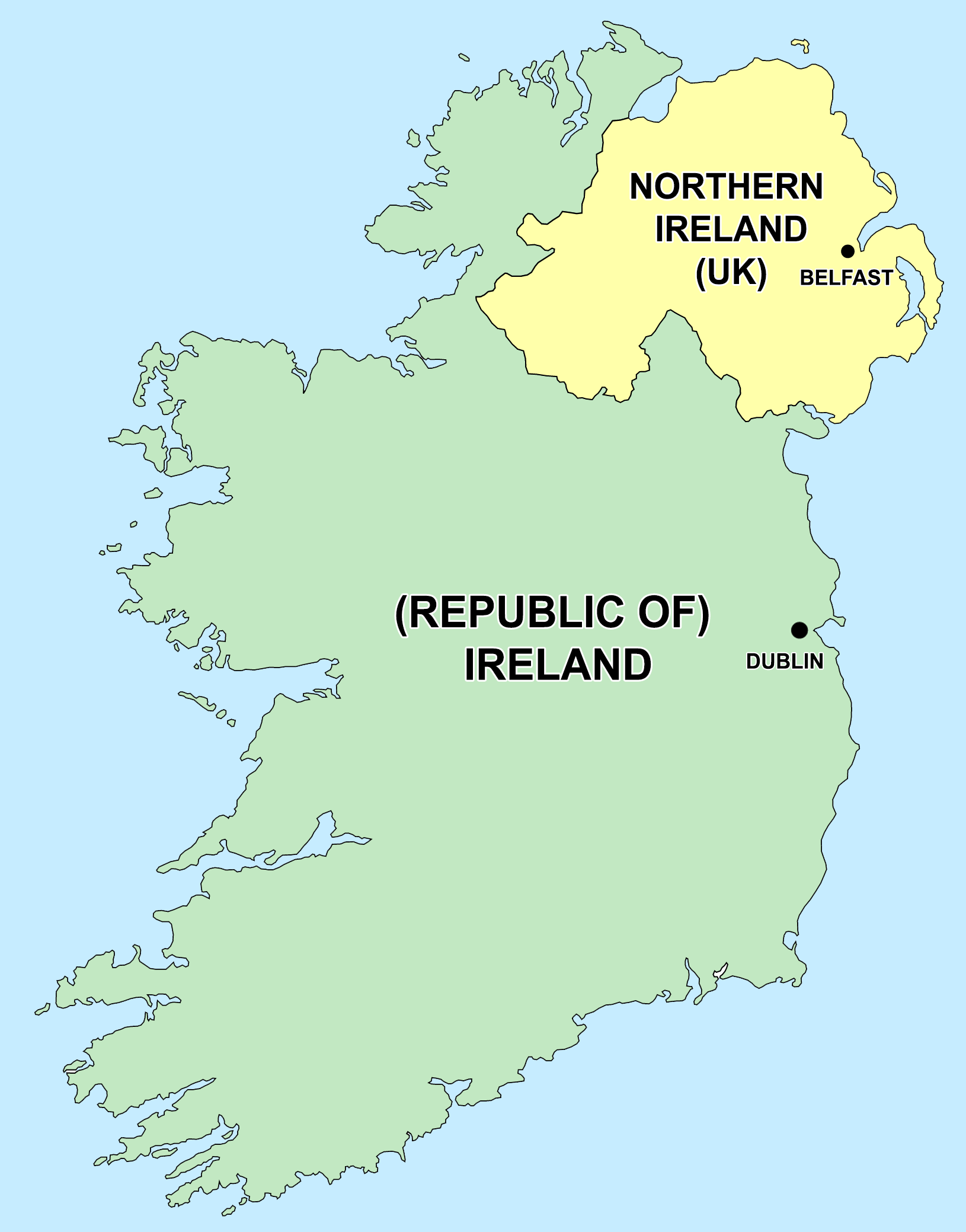
The partition of Ireland

From the late 1960s to 1998, the Northern Ireland conflict (also known as the Troubles), was a civil war between Irish republican groups, who wanted Northern Ireland to leave the United Kingdom and unite with the Republic of Ireland, and Ulster loyalist groups, who wanted Northern Ireland to remain part of the UK. The origin of the conflict occurred during the Irish revolutionary period of the early twentieth century, during which most of Ireland seceded from the UK and became the Irish Free State, while the northern six counties opted to remain under the terms of the Anglo-Irish Treaty. Republican groups consider themselves the legitimate successor of the Irish Republic of 1919 to 1921. Irish republicans do not recognise the partition and consider ongoing British rule in Ireland to be a foreign occupation. In Northern Ireland, Catholics generally supported Irish nationalism and the unification of Ireland, while Protestants generally supported unionism.

The Provisional IRA was the largest republican paramilitary group, while smaller groups include the INLA and the Official IRA. All three ceased paramilitary activity during the Northern Ireland peace process, which led to the 1998 Good Friday Agreement, the official end of the conflict. Dissident republicans—such as the Real IRA and the Continuity IRA—do not recognise the peace agreement and wage an ongoing campaign. The Ulster Defence Association/Ulster Freedom Fighters (UDA/UFF) and Ulster Volunteer Force (UVF) are rival groups that are responsible for the majority of loyalist murders during the Troubles, while smaller loyalist groups include the Red Hand Commando, and Loyalist Volunteer Force (LVF). Both republican and loyalist groups consider punishment attacks separate from military activity and continue to carry them out while on ceasefire status.

British troops were deployed in Northern Ireland from 1969 to 2007. The Royal Ulster Constabulary (RUC) was an armed force that took a military approach to counter-terrorism, had been drawn into pro-unionist sectarianism, colluded with loyalist groups, and committed police brutality, including beatings of suspects. Real and perceived human rights violations by security forces—including internment without trial, special courts for political offences, the use of plastic bullets by riot police, and alleged shoot-to-kill policy—further sapped the state's legitimacy for nationalists. In many neighbourhoods, the RUC was so focused on terrorism that it neglected ordinary policing, regular patrols, and non-political crime. Both nationalist and unionist communities complained that the RUC did not respond quickly enough to calls relating to petty crime, and that suspects were pressured to inform on paramilitaries. Since the replacement of the RUC with the Police Service of Northern Ireland (PSNI) in 2001, trust has improved, with more than 70% in both communities having a positive assessment of the PSNI's performance in 2018. However, in many republican neighbourhoods identity has been shaped by distrust of the authorities, with one republican neighbourhood in West Belfast reporting only 35% trust in the police. Since the disbanding of the RUC, trust is decreasing in some loyalist communities.

== Origins ==
Irish nationalist movements have a long history of establishing so-called "alternative legal systems", especially the land courts of the Land War and the Dáil Courts during the Irish War of Independence, as a form of resistance to British rule. In Northern Ireland, the "alternative justice" system survived partition and continued into the first years of the Northern Ireland polity. Following partition, loyalist militias patrolled parts of the border with the Irish Free State and, in Belfast, the Ulster Unionist Labour Association set up an unofficial police force in the 1920s.

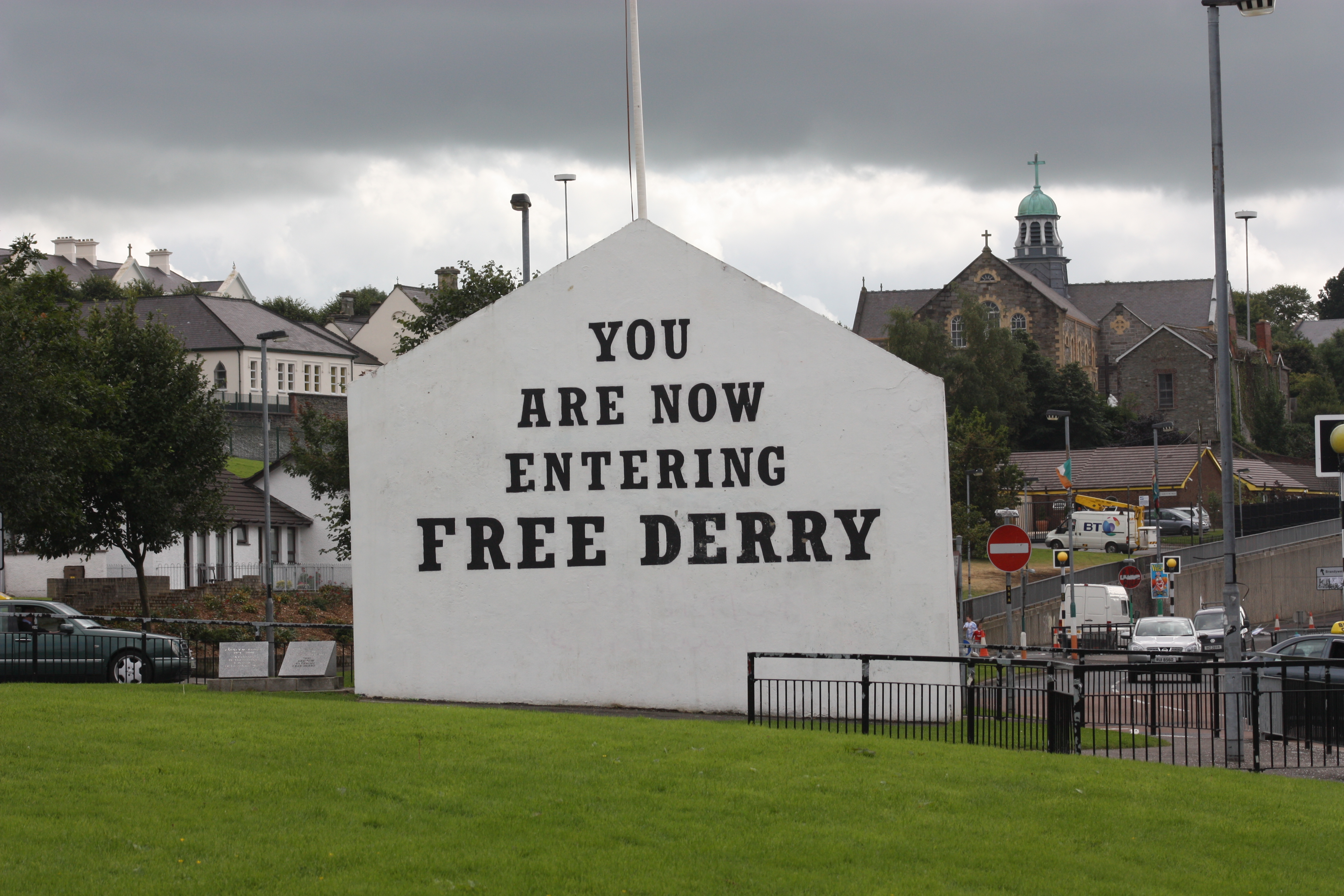
Free Derry corner

In the late 1960s, armed loyalists attacked Catholic communities in response to the Northern Ireland civil rights movement. To protect themselves, nationalists set up Citizen Defence Committees (not connected to violent republican groups) which built and manned barricades and patrolled the neighbourhood. The barricades prevented the RUC from entering and created "no-go zones", which lasted for the first ten years of the conflict. In nationalist neighbourhoods of Derry such as the Bogside, Brandywell, and Creggan, these committees worked to control petty crime by delivering stern lectures to the accused. In the 1970s, the Free Derry Police also operated independent of paramilitary groups. "People's courts" which mostly imposed sentences of community service based on a restorative justice approach operated in the early years of the conflict, but shut down due to police intimidation and because they did not have the purported "authority" of "punishment" imposed by paramilitaries. In nationalist Belfast, the Catholic Ex-Servicemen's Association initially played a role in keeping order. At the same time, Protestant neighbourhoods began to organise defence groups in response to retaliatory raids. Such groups formed the basis of the UDA.

The Catholic civil initiatives proved short-lived as they were quickly overtaken by the IRA, a minor player in 1969. Serious sectarian violence and police brutality led Catholics to view the IRA, despite its flaws, as the "guarantor of their safety". At the same time, there was a spike in crime: from two murders and three or four armed robberies each year in the 1960s to 200 murders and 600 armed robberies annually during the next decade. Petty criminals were often offered immunity by law enforcement in exchange for informing on paramilitaries. Many rural areas had a system of dual control between the IRA and the authorities. As the 1970s progressed, the IRA took an increasing and harsher role in punishing alleged offenders within their community, no longer negotiating with accused offenders and their families. Kneecappings were a weekly occurrence in West Belfast by 1975. During the 1975 truce, "Provo Police Stations" were set up by Sinn Féin, the political wing of the IRA. These centres shifted the responsibility of informal justice from the IRA to Sinn Féin. Once a crime had been reported to Sinn Féin, the party would assign its Civil Administration Officers to investigate. Suspects often were given the opportunity to defend themselves before the organisation made a decision on their guilt or innocence. Sinn Féin could issue a warning or pass the information to the IRA for punishment.

== Causes ==
One cause of vigilantism is the breakdown in law and order and lack of trust in the authorities. According to anthropologist Neil Jarman, vigilantism emerged in both loyalist and republican areas due to the failings in state policing, a gap which paramilitaries ended up filling. According to sociologist Ronaldo Munck, punishment attacks represent "a sharp contest over the legitimacy of criminal justice within a society deeply divided along ethno-national lines". In republican neighbourhoods, the IRA was the only organisation with the capability to offer an effective alternative to the British judicial system. The ideology of self-reliance in defence of loyalist attacks came to extend to defending the community from crime, which created a cycle where the IRA was expected to deal with criminality but had no way to do so besides violent attacks. (Note: Some paramilitary groups do have the ability to hold prisoners captive for extended periods of time, but this strains their resources so much that it can only be used rarely.)

Popular demand for paramilitary punishment is widely regarded as one of the main causes of the attacks. Both republican and loyalist paramilitaries claim that they began to enforce informal justice due to demand from their communities, and vigilantism came at the expense of the IRA's military campaign. Sociologist Heather Hamill argues that in republican areas, the IRA was "a willing and capable supplier" that actively fostered demand for punishment attacks, motivated both by "self-interest in encouraging dependence and loyalty among the local population and a genuine desire... to provide a service to the community".

Many locals believe the victims deserve the attacks because they have typically broken local conventions governing acceptable behaviour and often actively seek out the circumstances that led to their punishment. Some local republican and loyalist politicians have justified the attacks by saying that the official system fails working-class communities which bear the brunt of crime. In community meetings attended by criminologist Kieran McEvoy and sociologist Harry Mika around the turn of the century, the authors frequently encountered "vocal support for punishment violence" and accusations that local politicians who supported restorative justice were "abandoning" their responsibility to protect their communities. In March 2000, an article in Andersonstown News said that the "North Belfast kneecapping squad" could easily win an election.

Unlike law enforcement, which is bound by due process, paramilitaries can act swiftly and directly in punishing alleged offenders, whereas conviction rates for crimes such as burglary and joyriding are very low, due to the difficulty of securing evidence. Because of the tight-knit nature of Northern Ireland communities, paramilitaries can often find the perpetrator via local gossip. Local residents credit paramilitaries for keeping Belfast relatively free of drugs and non-political crime. Over time, residents became accustomed to paramilitary attacks and used to not relying on police. In 2019, Foreign Policy reported that PSNI still "finds itself powerless in the face of influential paramilitaries" to stop punishment attacks. In the words of a local resident, many people feel that "at least somebody's doing something about [drug dealing]". According to surveys, the number of Northern Ireland residents living in affected areas who think that punishment attacks are sometimes justified has decreased from 35% to 19% following the Department of Justice's 2018 "Ending the Harm" campaign.

According to Unionist politicians, and some writers such as Liam Kennedy and Malachi O'Doherty, protecting their own communities is only a pretext and the paramilitaries' real goal is to consolidate control over the community. Kennedy argues that paramilitaries are attempting to consolidate "a patchwork of Mafia-style mini-states" via vigilante violence and economically sustained by extortion and racketeering. Researchers argue that "the notion that paramilitaries can 'control' local communities is something of a myth" which ignores the dependence of paramilitaries on their communities and the support for paramilitarism within those communities. Terrorism researcher Andrew Silke argues that both loyalist and republican paramilitaries are reluctant vigilantes, and that their vigilantism is unrelated to their raison d'être. Silke argues that paramilitaries engage in vigilantism because both informing and petty crime undermine the terrorist group, the latter because if the paramilitaries' response is not satisfactory, it can erode their local support.

== Perpetrators ==
=== Republican groups ===
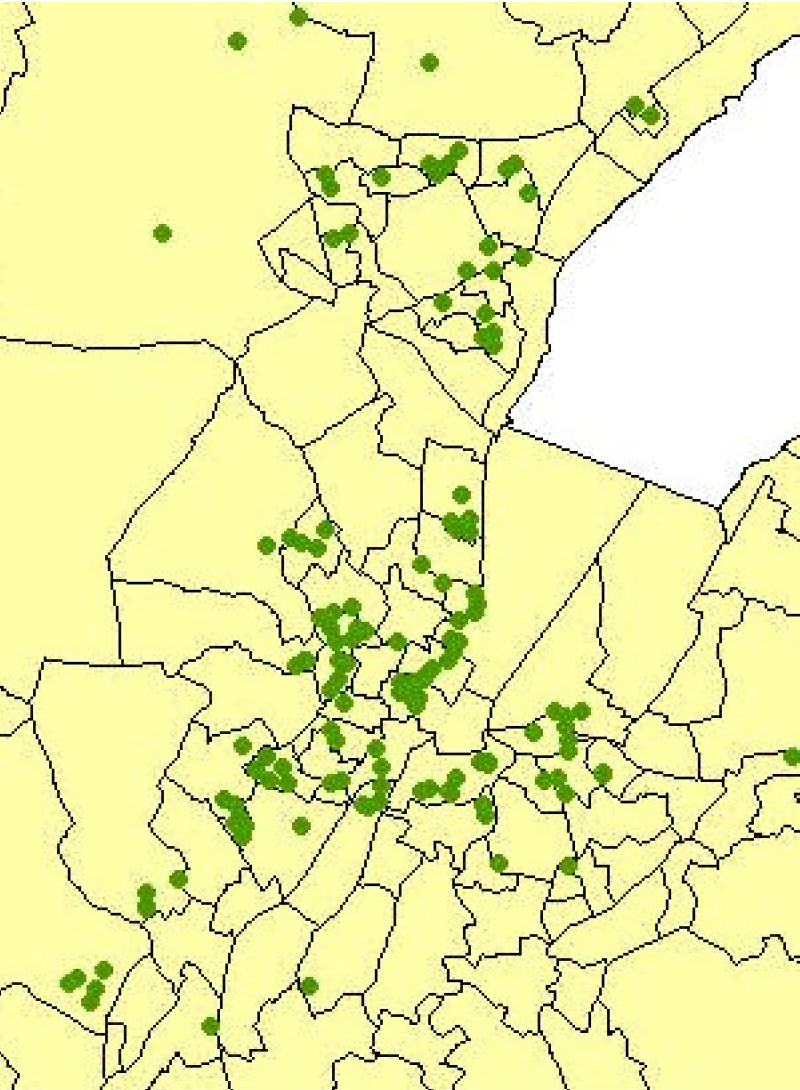
Map of punishment attacks that occurred in Belfast between 1998 and 2000. North and East Belfast, as well as Shankill, see the highest rate of loyalist punishment attacks, while West Belfast is the worst area for republican attacks.

The Provisional IRA, which is assumed to be responsible for most republican paramilitary punishment attacks, targeted both "political" and "normal" criminals. The IRA defined "political" crime as informing or fraternising with British soldiers, while "normal" crime was judged to include vandalism, theft, joyriding, rape, selling drugs, and "antisocial behaviour"—anything from verbally abusing the elderly to dumping rubbish. "Normal" crimes by first-time alleged offenders were often dealt with by a restorative justice approach based on providing restitution to victims. The typical punishment for repeat offenders was kneecapping, a malicious wounding of the knee with a bullet. The IRA claimed that its methods were more lenient than those of other insurgent groups, such as the Algerian FLN or the French resistance, an assertion Munck agrees with.

The IRA also punished its own members for misusing the organisation's name, losing weapons, disobeying orders, or breaking other rules, and launched purges against other republican paramilitary groups such as the Irish People's Liberation Organisation and the Official IRA. Within the IRA, those responsible for punishment belonged to auxiliary cells and were considered the "dregs" of the organisation. The IRA maintained distinct sections for internal and external punishment. Although informers were usually killed, part of the IRA's strategy for defeating informers included periodic amnesties (usually announced after murders) during which anyone could admit to informing without punishment. Around 1980, the system of punishment attacks was questioned by IRA figures, which resulted in an increase in warnings given. The IRA pledged to stop kneecapping in 1983, and both shootings and beatings drastically declined. Soon, community members were calling for more paramilitary attacks to combat an increase in crime, especially violent rapes.

Other republican paramilitary groups also punished alleged offenders but on a smaller scale. Direct Action Against Drugs, which claimed responsibility for some murders of alleged drug dealers between 1995 and 2001, was made up of Provisional IRA members and was alleged to be an IRA front group. Other republican anti-drug vigilante groups include Republican Action Against Drugs, Irish Republican Movement, and Action Against Drugs. Along with conventional terrorism, punishment attacks are a major feature of the dissident Irish republican campaign carried out by the New IRA and other groups. The attacks are controversial among dissident republicans, some of whom question whether any benefit of the attacks is worth the internal division and alienation of youth.

=== Loyalist groups ===
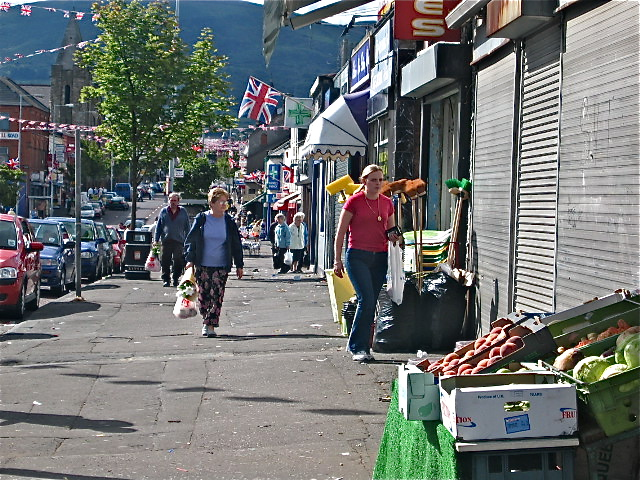
Shankill Road is a hotspot for loyalist attacks

Ulster loyalist paramilitaries, whilst not drawing on historical precedents, justified their role in terms of maintaining order and enforcing the law. Unlike republican vigilantes, they saw their role as aiding the Royal Ulster Constabulary rather than subverting it. Nevertheless, they were prepared to mete out their own punishments in cases where they judged the official justice system had not dealt harshly enough with the alleged offender. In 1971, the Ulster Defence Association (UDA), the largest Ulster loyalist group, was formed as a merger between various neighbourhood watch and vigilante groups. It adopted the motto Codenta Arma Togae ("law before violence") and stated that its aim is to see order restored throughout Northern Ireland. The UDA collected evidence on petty crime and used vigilante punishment against criminals, antisocial elements, rival Ulster loyalist paramilitary groups, and as a means of discipline within groups. It also used the threat of punishment in order to conscript new members. The Ulster Volunteer Force (UVF) used to patrol the Shankill neighbourhood in Belfast. Criminals were warned or reported to the official police. The UDA and UVF are responsible for most loyalist punishment attacks.

Between 1973 and 1985, loyalists were responsible for far fewer punishment attacks than republicans, due to a view that their role was protecting Protestants from Catholics rather than enforcing rules within Protestant communities. From 1985 to 1998, they were responsible for a similar number of attacks. According to insider Sammy Duddy, the UDA stopped reporting offenders to the police and started to engage in punishment shootings because the police were pressuring the offenders to inform on loyalist groups. Since the Good Friday Agreement, loyalists have committed significantly more punishment attacks than republicans. The increase in punishment attacks has been attributed to increasing mistrust of official law enforcement, ineffectiveness at controlling petty crime, and perceived leniency of sentences. Both the UDA and UVF have less internal discipline than the IRA, which means that an order to stop would be difficult to enforce. Loyalist groups' punishment style is more haphazard and groups who cannot find their intended target have been known to attack an innocent Catholic individual. Hamill writes that loyalist groups' victim profiles suggests that they use punishment attacks for intragroup discipline and intergroup feuds to a greater degree than republicans. Individuals have joined loyalist paramilitaries to avoid a punishment attack from a rival group. Unlike republican groups, loyalist paramilitaries carry out more punishment attacks than are desired by public opinion in their communities.

In 1996, newspapers reported that the UVF had set up a "court" in Shankill which fined offenders for various offences, but according to sociologist Heather Hamill this is more likely a reflection of ability to pay rather than a genuine justice system based on severity of the offence. In 2003, the North Belfast branch of the UDA announced that it was ceasing violent punishments in favour of "naming and shaming" offenders, who were forced to stand with placards announcing their offence. This change proved short-lived.

== Attacks ==
The punishment methods of republican and loyalist paramilitaries are similar. Because paramilitaries rely on popular support, they cannot overstep community consensus on appropriate punishment without risking the loss of support. The penalty chosen would be based on the crime and potentially mitigating or aggravating factors such as criminal history, age, gender, and family background. Crime against targets valued by the community, such as religious leaders, pensioners, community centres, or locally owned businesses, tended to be punished more harshly than crimes against large corporations, which were frequently ignored. Punishment attacks often begin when masked paramilitaries break into the victim's home. In other cases, victims would be told to show up at a certain time and place, either at a political front organisation or at their home, for the attack. Many victims keep these appointments because if they fail to do so, the punishment would be escalated in severity. These appointments are more likely to be made by republican than loyalist groups. Some victims were able to negotiate the type of punishment. In order to avoid the victims dying, paramilitaries frequently call emergency services after the attack. In cases of mistaken identity, the IRA was known to issue apologies after the fact.

Initially, both republican and loyalist paramilitaries were reluctant to shoot or seriously harm women and children younger than 16, although this became more frequent as the Troubles continued. Even female informers were usually subject to humiliation-type punishment rather than physical violence. There were exceptions, such as the case of accused informer Jean McConville, who was kidnapped and killed in 1972.

=== Non-physical ===
More minor punishments, often used on "first offenders", are warnings, promises not to offend again, curfews, and fines. Parents sometimes requested that their child be warned in order to keep him or her from greater involvement in juvenile delinquency. During the 1970s, when the IRA had the most control over established "no-go zones", humiliation was often used as a form of punishment. The victim was forced to hold a placard or tarred and feathered. In republican areas, women accused of fraternising with British soldiers had their heads shaved. The use of such types of humiliation was greatest in the 1970s and decreased due to the risk of getting caught and complaints from Derry Women's Aid that the practice was misogynistic.

Sometimes paramilitaries would approach a person and ask them to leave West Belfast or Northern Ireland within a certain period of time (such as 48 hours), with an implicit threat of serious injury or death if they did not comply. It could be applied arbitrarily when paramilitaries go out looking for the victim but cannot find him, and instead issuing an expulsion order to friends or relatives. Expulsion was an alternative to violence favoured by paramilitaries because it removed the offender from the community whilst avoiding bloodshed. However, victims frequently experienced it as the worst form of attack short of being killed. Most victims are young, unemployed and lack educational qualifications as well as the skills and savings needed to establish themselves in a new area. Expulsion can be a life sentence but usually it lasts between three months and two years. Some victims, although they have not been convicted of any crime, go to juvenile detention centres to avoid punishment until their sentence expires.

=== Beatings ===
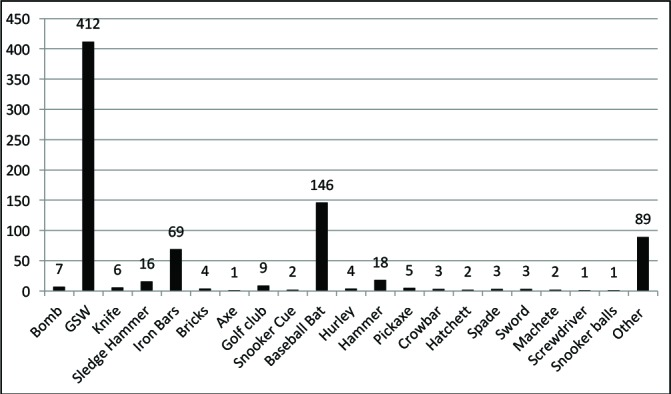
Weapons used against paramilitary punishment victims who required orthopedic treatment, 1997–2017. GSW refers to gunshot wound.

Some individuals report that the attack was quite mild and no more than a "cuff around the ear" or being slapped around. Other beatings are more severe and the victim ends up in hospital for a considerable period of time. Beatings are accomplished with instruments such as baseball bats, hammers, golf clubs, hurley sticks, iron bars, concrete blocks, and cudgels (often studded with nails). The resulting injury can be quite severe, involving flesh split by nails, broken skulls, broken limbs, punctured lungs, and other serious damage. More injuries affected the limbs than the torso. In some cases, paramilitaries used powered drills and hacksaws to directly injure bone. Beatings became more severe after the 1994 ceasefires due to the reduction in shootings, and were often accomplished with baseball bats and similar implements studded with six-inch nails. In the worst cases, individuals were hung from railings and nailed to fences in a form of crucifixion.

=== Shootings ===
Victims are typically shot in the knees, thighs, elbows, ankles, or a combination of these. Kneecapping is considered a "trademark" of the IRA, although it became less popular over time because the disability and mortality incurred was unpopular with the community. It was replaced with low-velocity shots aimed at the soft tissue in the lower limbs. As a result, "kneecapping" is frequently a misnomer because by the 2010s most injuries targeted the femur or popliteal area rather than the knee joint. Typically, the victim is forced to lie face down and shot from behind. Republican paramilitaries tended to shoot side to side while loyalists shot back to front, causing more severe damage. As with beatings, there are various degrees of shooting, with the number of shots, proximity to a joint, and the calibre of the firearm depending on the severity of the alleged offence. If the victim is shot in the fleshy part of the thigh, it will heal quickly with little damage. On the other hand, if they are shot directly in the joint it can cause permanent disability. An especially severe form is the "six pack", during which a victim is shot in both knees, elbows, and ankles. Some victims are shot at the base of the spine, dubbed "fifty-fifty" as there is a fifty percent chance of permanent paralysis. Depending on the attack, shooting can leave relatively minor injuries compared to a severe beating, with one NHS doctor estimating that half of those with such injuries will have only minor scars. The IRA sought the advice of doctors in how to cause serious but non-lethal injury. They were advised to shoot the ankles and wrists instead of the knees because it lessened the risk of the victim bleeding out, as happened to Andrew Kearney in 1998. The harshest punishments are for informing, which typically results in death.

=== Consequences ===
Knee injury caused by a punishment shooting

According to psychiatrist Oscar Daly, who treats victims of the attacks, the characteristics of those who tend to be victims—such as having had poor parenting and preexisting mental health problems—make them more vulnerable to psychological sequelae. A 1995 study found that symptoms of post-traumatic stress disorder, such as flashbacks, hypervigilance, difficulty concentrating, and attempts to numb or minimise the incident, are common in youth who survive a punishment attack. According Hamill's research, desire to escape fear and the feeling of powerlessness can contribute to problems with alcoholism and drug abuse. More than one-third of her subjects suffered from extended bouts of depression following attacks and 22% said that they had attempted suicide. Mallon analysed the 402 suicides in Northern Ireland between 2007 and 2009 and identified 19 cases in which young men had killed themselves after being threatened with punishment attacks for alleged criminal or anti-social behaviour.

In 2002, the National Health Service estimated that it spent at least £1.5 million annually on treating the victims of punishment attacks. Depending on the time period under consideration, the per-patient cost of treating victims who have been physically attacked varies from £2,855 (2012–2013) to £6,017 (pre-1994) in 2015 pounds. These figures only include the first hospital admission and therefore do not include the cost of treating resulting psychological disorders. The lower cost is due both to less severe attacks and improved treatment techniques. Many victims were treated at Royal Victoria Hospital, Belfast, which developed expertise in dealing with the particular injuries involved. Punishment beatings often leave victims with serious injuries and permanently disabled. Kneecapping often resulted in neurovascular damage which had to be treated with weeks in the hospital and extensive outpatient rehabilitation, but medical advancements allowed most later victims to regain most function in their limbs. Between 1969 and 2003, 13 patients treated at Musgrave Park Hospital in Belfast required leg amputation because of kneecapping attacks.

If considered "innocent victims of violent crime", victims of punishment attacks (like others injured by paramilitaries) are eligible for compensation by the Compensation Agency of the Northern Ireland Office.

== Statistics ==
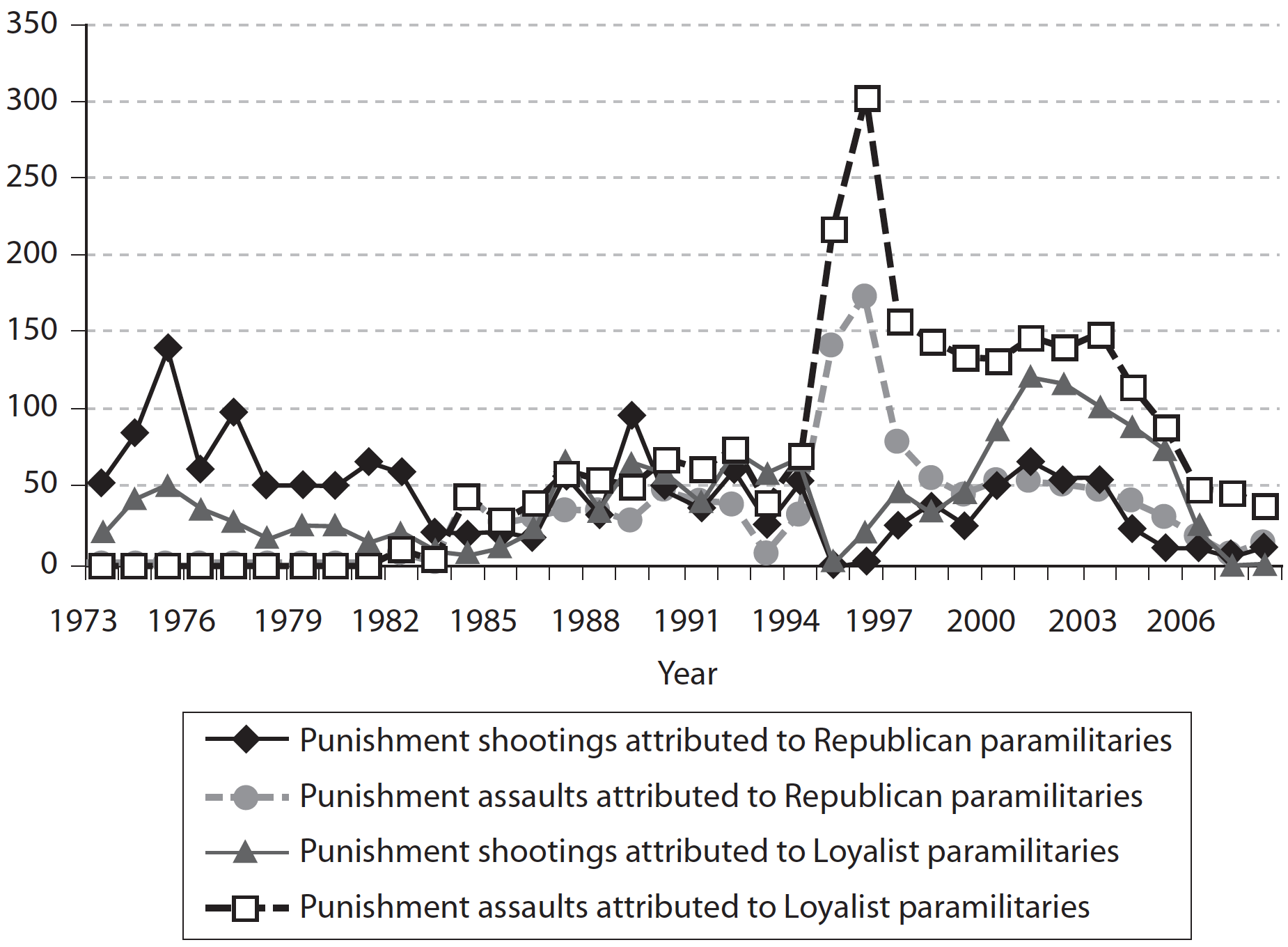

Police received reports of 6,106 punishment attacks between 1973 and 2015, of which 3,113 incidents were attributed to loyalists and 2,993 to republicans. At least 115 people were killed by these attacks between 1973 and 2000. These statistics only include incidents reported to the police, and are therefore considered by researchers to represent only "the tip of the iceberg". No statistics exist for other forms of penalties, such as expulsion, (Note: Belfast victim-support group Base 2 knows of 453 people who were expelled between 1994 and 1996. Of these, 42% were expelled from Northern Ireland, 20% were ordered to leave their town, and 38% had to leave their neighbourhood only.) humiliation, fines, curfews, or warnings. The estimates of incidents in the 1970s is particularly suspect, since punishment beatings were not counted.

Punishment attacks correlate with external events related to the conflict. More than half of all reported attacks have occurred since the 1994 ceasefires. After the ceasefires declared by loyalist and republican paramilitaries in 1994, the number of shootings decreased while beatings increased as the groups wanted to appear to be following the terms of the ceasefire (in the months before the ceasefire, there had been a wave of shootings). The overall rate of attacks spiked; one explanation for the rise in attacks was the decrease in conventional terrorism, which resulted in bored paramilitaries who turned their attention to punishment attacks. However, according to researcher Dermot Feenan there is no evidence for this. After the peace agreement was finalised in 1998, the number of fatal terrorist attacks greatly decreased but beatings and intimidation continued to increase. Within a few years shooting attacks were also on the rise, but decreased later in the 2000s as both republican and loyalist paramilitaries decommissioned. Punishment attacks reached an absolute low in 2007, when Northern Ireland gained devolved powers as a result of the St Andrews Agreement. There was a slight rebound and around 80 attacks have been committed annually from 2010 to 2019. In 2018, Community Restorative Justice Ireland estimated that each year there are 250–300 threats of violence, significantly higher than the number reported to PSNI.

Most victims of punishment attacks are young men in their twenties. Less than ten percent of victims are female. Between 1994 and 2014, 12.7% of victims were minors and the youngest twelve years old. Victims of loyalists are older on average; 33% are over the age of 30 years compared to 15% for republicans. Since 1990, half of victims were attacked in Belfast, and during the 2010s, immigrants increasingly became victims of the attacks. In most attacks, only one person is assaulted. Resistance is rarely attempted, because most victims perceive their situation to be hopeless. Sometimes, if a bystander steps in to defend the targeted person, they will be attacked as well. About three-quarters of attacks take place between 16:00 and midnight; the majority begin in the victim's residence (often they are abducted and taken elsewhere for the main attack). Most loyalist attacks involve between three and five attackers, but two-thirds of IRA attacks involve five or more attackers.

== Victims ==
=== "Hoods" ===
Most victims come from a delinquent youth subculture colloquially known as "hoods". Offences that they commit range from organised drug dealing to joyriding. Joyriding is especially common in West Belfast and the vast majority of offenders in Northern Ireland come from the Catholic community. Hoods continue to offend even though they know that this puts them at high risk of punishment. According to one study, this is because prestige in this subculture is based on costly signals of toughness and individuals are able to attain even higher prestige when they show that they are undeterred by punishment attacks. According to another study, hoods regard having been kneecapped as a "mark of prestige". Drug dealing was strongly opposed by the IRA, with the commander of the Belfast Brigade declaring that drugs are the "poison of our community" and their purveyors responsible for "CRIMES AGAINST HUMANITY". During the 2000s, several republican and loyalist groups have themselves become involved in drug trafficking and other forms of organised crime.

=== Politically motivated attacks ===
Other victims are attacked for political reasons, such as part of feuds with other groups. For example, in 1998 the IRA attacked both Kevin McQuillan, a leader in the rival Irish Republican Socialist Party, and Michael Donnelly, chairman of Republican Sinn Féin in Derry. One reason for the resurgence of dissident republicans after the IRA's disbanding in 2005 was that previously, the organisation had been conducting campaigns of social ostracism, intimidation, kidnapping, and assassination against dissident republicans. These attacks deter opponents of paramilitary groups from criticising them. Other victims, such as Andrew Kearney and Andrew Peden, were attacked after quarrelling with paramilitary members.

=== Sexual offences ===
Republican and loyalist paramilitaries targeted accused child molesters. Loyalist paramilitaries also deal harshly with sexual crimes. Republican paramilitaries shot a 79-year-old man in both arms and legs after mistaking him for an accused child molester.

=== Gay men ===
Loyalist paramilitaries also targeted gay men One Presbyterian minister, David J. Templeton, was outed as gay and died after a beating by the UVF in 1997.

== Opposition ==
Punishment attacks are condemned by all major political parties in Northern Ireland. In 1990, Nancy Gracey set up the organisation Families Against Intimidation and Terror to oppose punishment attacks after her grandson was killed in one. Beginning in the 1970s, the RUC conducted a propaganda campaign against punishment attacks, seeking to portray their perpetrators as preying on an innocent, harmonious community and seeking a "monopoly on crime for themselves". In 2018, the PSNI launched the "Ending the Harm" campaign to raise awareness of punishment attacks.

=== Legality ===
People who carry out punishment attacks can be prosecuted for crimes such as assault, battery, and bodily harm. The sixth of the Mitchell Principles, which paramilitary groups agreed to abide by in 1998, explicitly forbids extrajudicial punishment and requires that signatories put an end to the practice. The United States was reluctant to threaten the success of the peace process due to punishment attacks, because it considered that these did not fit the conventional definition of terrorism. The ban on punishment attacks was never well enforced, and paramilitaries make a distinction between "punishment" and paramilitary actions, only ceasing the latter.

Authorities have been unable or unwilling to prosecute the perpetrators of the attacks, because attackers usually wear masks and even if aware of their identity, many victims are reluctant to identify them for fear of retaliation. Of 317 punishment attacks reported to the PSNI between 2013 and 2017, only 10 resulted in charges or a court summons. Between July 1994 and December 1996, loyalists were convicted at a four times higher rate than republican attackers because working-class Protestants were more likely to cooperate with the police. In a plurality of cases, there are no witnesses besides the victim. PSNI established the Paramilitary Crime Task Force in 2017, in part to crack down on punishment attacks.

=== Restorative justice ===
In 1990, the Belfast-based victim support group Base 2 was founded. In the first eight years, it helped more than 1,000 people stay in their communities and avoid punishment attacks. Since then, there have been community-based attempts to mediate conflict between paramilitaries and their targets via a restorative justice approach. These interventions have included verifying if an individual is under sentence of expulsion, helping such individuals relocate elsewhere, and eventually reintegrating them into the community. Alleged offenders may be offered mediation with the wronged party and asked to offer restitution or perform community service. As part of the programme, they have to stop the behaviour and cease using alcohol and drugs. These are voluntary programmes, and require the agreement of both parties. Some offenders prefer the official justice system or to suffer paramilitary punishment.

Sinn Féin supported restorative justice, which was endorsed by the IRA in 1999; the organisation also asked locals to stop requesting punishment attacks. About this time, Community Restorative Justice Ireland (CRJI) was established to coordinate restorative justice initiatives in republican areas. The RUC's opposition to the centres made them ideologically acceptable to republicans. Before 2007, the republican restorative justice centres did not cooperate with the PSNI. CRJI is opposed by dissident republicans; Saoirse Irish Freedom (the organ of Republican Sinn Féin) once described it as "British double speak for collaboration with Crown Forces". Loyalist neighbourhoods have also seen community restorative justice approaches, organised by Northern Ireland Alternatives, which originated in the greater Shankill area in 1996 and worked closely with the police from the beginning, despite scepticism from law enforcement.

Restorative justice initiatives involve former paramilitaries and have the support of local communities. According to a study by Atlantic Philanthropies, Alternatives prevented 71% of punishment attacks by loyalists and CRJI prevented 81% of attacks by republicans. For example, people who ask the IRA to commit an attack have been told that the organisation is no longer willing to carry out attacks and redirected to CRJI. INLA and the Irish Republican Socialist Party have also dissociated themselves from paramilitary attacks. In 2006, the eighth report of the International Monitoring Commission described participation in restorative justice as one means by which paramilitaries attempted to maintain their role and exert influence. Another argument against restorative justice is that it institutionalises a different justice system for the rich and poor.
