= Joseph Rafferty (disambiguation) =

Joseph Rafferty may refer to:

- Joe Rafferty (Australian politician) (1911–2000), Australian politician
- Joe Rafferty (Maine politician) (born 1955), American politician
- Joseph Rafferty (c. 1974–2005), murder victim, see murder of Joseph Rafferty
- Joe Rafferty (born 1993), English born footballer
