= Republican Defence Army =

The Republican Defence Army (RDA) is a splinter group from the Provisional Irish Republican Army that emerged in 2006. The group was blamed for a handful of minor assaults and threats of violence, as well as claims the group was linked to a murder in Strabane. Little is known about the group, and in 2011 it was considered defunct. In March 2025, the group issued a statement claiming they were under new leadership, and prepared to carry out attacks against drug dealers.

It was acknowledged by the Independent Monitoring Commission (IMC) in Northern Ireland. The IMC reported that the leadership of Sinn Féin have engaged in dialogue with the RDA regarding their views for peaceful progression of their campaign and Sinn Féin's strategies. The outcome of these negotiations has not been made public.
