= List of chronologies of Provisional Irish Republican Army actions =

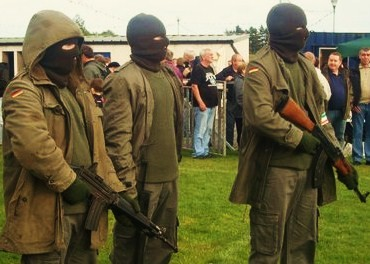
2009 reenactment of a Provisional IRA unit in Galbally, County Tyrone

Chronologies of Provisional Irish Republican Army actions detail activities by the Provisional Irish Republican Army, an Irish republican paramilitary organisation that sought to end British rule in Northern Ireland and bring about an independent republic encompassing all of Ireland. The chronologies are mostly organized by decade.

== Chronologies ==
- Chronology of Provisional Irish Republican Army actions (1970–1979)
- Chronology of Provisional Irish Republican Army actions (1980–1989)
- Chronology of Provisional Irish Republican Army actions (1990–1991)
- Chronology of Provisional Irish Republican Army actions (1992–1999)
- Chronology of Provisional Irish Republican Army actions in the 21st century

== See also ==
- Timeline of Continuity Irish Republican Army actions
- Timeline of Real Irish Republican Army actions
- Timeline of Irish National Liberation Army actions
- Timeline of Official Irish Republican Army actions
- Timeline of Ulster Volunteer Force actions
- Timeline of Ulster Defence Association actions
- Timeline of the Northern Ireland Troubles
- Provisional IRA in the Republic of Ireland
- List of attacks on British aircraft during The Troubles
