= Assessment on Paramilitary Groups in Northern Ireland =

The independent Assessment on Paramilitary Groups in Northern Ireland was announced by the United Kingdom government in September 2015 in response to the political crisis in Northern Ireland. The assessment sought to establish "the structure, role and purpose of paramilitary organisations in Northern Ireland." The report was delivered to the Secretary of State for Northern Ireland on 19 October 2015 and published the next day. It concluded that: "all the main paramilitary groups operating during the Troubles are still in existence including the Ulster Volunteer Force, Red Hand Commando, Ulster Defence Association, the Provisional IRA and Irish National Liberation Army." But that "the leaderships of the main paramilitary groups are committed to peaceful means to achieve their political objectives".

== Background ==
A political crisis evolved in 2015 in Northern Ireland around the possible continuation of the Provisional Irish Republican Army (IRA).

In August 2015, the Police Service of Northern Ireland (PSNI) Chief Constable stated that the IRA no longer exists as a paramilitary organization. He said that some of its structure remains, but that the group is committed to following a peaceful political path and is not engaged in criminal activity or directing violence. However, he added that some members have engaged in criminal activity or violence for their own ends. The statement was in response to the recent killings of two former IRA members. In May, former IRA commander Gerard Davison was shot dead in Belfast. He had been involved in Direct Action Against Drugs and it is believed he was killed by an organized crime gang. Three months later, former IRA member Kevin McGuigan was also shot dead in Belfast. It is believed he was killed by the group Action Against Drugs, in revenge for the Davison killing. The Chief Constable believed that IRA members collaborated with Action Against Drugs, but without the sanction of the IRA.

Sinn Féin stated that the IRA no longer exists, echoing previous comments. For example, its party president said in 2014: "The IRA is gone. It is finished".

Following political pressure from unionists, Theresa Villiers, the Secretary of State for Northern Ireland, announced the Independent Assessment.

== Form ==
The assessment was made by the UK security agencies, specifically MI5 and the PSNI. It was independently reviewed by three individuals, who were appointed after the initial announcement. These were Rosalie Flanagan (former permanent secretary at the Northern Ireland Assembly's Department of Culture, Arts and Leisure; worked in the Office of the First Minister and Deputy First Minister, 2002–10), Stephen Shaw QC (a senior barrister from Northern Ireland who has acted for local and central government, private firms and public companies, specialising in commercial and public law work) and Alex Carlile QC (a barrister and Liberal Democrat peer, who has been the independent reviewer of national security arrangements in Northern Ireland since 2007).

== Reaction to announcement ==
The Democratic Unionist Party, the largest party in the Northern Ireland Assembly, and the Ulster Unionist Party, the second largest unionist party, welcomed the review, as did the Alliance Party of Northern Ireland. The PSNI and the government of the Republic of Ireland also welcomed the process.

However, Traditional Unionist Voice criticised the assessment as having "all the appearance of politically motivated and timed window-dressing".

A representative of Sinn Féin, Conor Murphy, described the panel as unnecessary, saying, "Nothing and no one can be allowed a veto over the democratic process. Sinn Féin is in government on the basis of our electoral mandate."

Vincent Kearney, the BBC's Northern Ireland Home Affairs Correspondent, questioned whether the assessment can or will say anything different to prior PSNI statements, or what the PSNI or UK National Crime Agency could immediately report.

== Report ==
The report was published on 20 October 2015.

=== Conclusions with respect to different groups ===
Ulster Volunteer Force
The assessment confirms that the "structures of the UVF remain in existence and that there are some indications of recruitment", but that "the UVF's leadership has attempted to steer its membership towards peaceful initiatives and to carve out a new constructive role in representing the loyalist community". It also, however, concludes that "a larger number of members, including some senior figures, are extensively involved in organised crime".
Ulster Defence Association
The assessment describes UDA structures as remaining in existence, but as having become fragmented, split into "discrete geographical areas" that "act almost completely autonomously". It reports both that "with the support of some leadership figures there are UDA members who have continued attempts to steer the group into positive community based activism", but that others are involved in criminal and violent behaviour, including "drug dealing, robbery, extortion, and the distribution of counterfeit and contraband goods".
Provisional IRA
The assessment reports that "the structures of PIRA remain in existence in a much reduced form", including "a senior leadership, the 'Provisional Army Council' and some 'departments'", but that they are not recruiting members. It concludes that the PIRA still has access to some weapons, but have not sought to procure more since at least 2011. It also says that IRA members believe the Army Council oversees both the PIRA and Sinn Féin.
Irish National Liberation Army
Some INLA members are reported to have provided help to dissident Republican groups.

== Reaction to report ==
Following the report's publication, Democratic Unionist Party (DUP) ministers resumed their roles in the Northern Ireland Assembly, with talks continued to resolve the political crisis there at Stormont. Gregory Campbell of the DUP said that the "report now provides the basis for which everyone has to get those vestiges of paramilitary activity removed".

Sinn Féin's Gerry Kelly stated that the party is overseen only by its own executive committee and not by the IRA Army Council.
