= DAAD =

DAAD may refer to:

- Democratic Alliance Against Dictatorship, a political group in Thailand
- Direct Action Against Drugs, a cover name for the Provisional Irish Republican Army
- The German Academic Exchange Service (German Deutscher Akademischer Austauschdienst)
  - DAAD Artists-in-Berlin Program
