= The Troubles in Cullyhanna =

Incidents in Cullyhanna, Northern Ireland during the Troubles

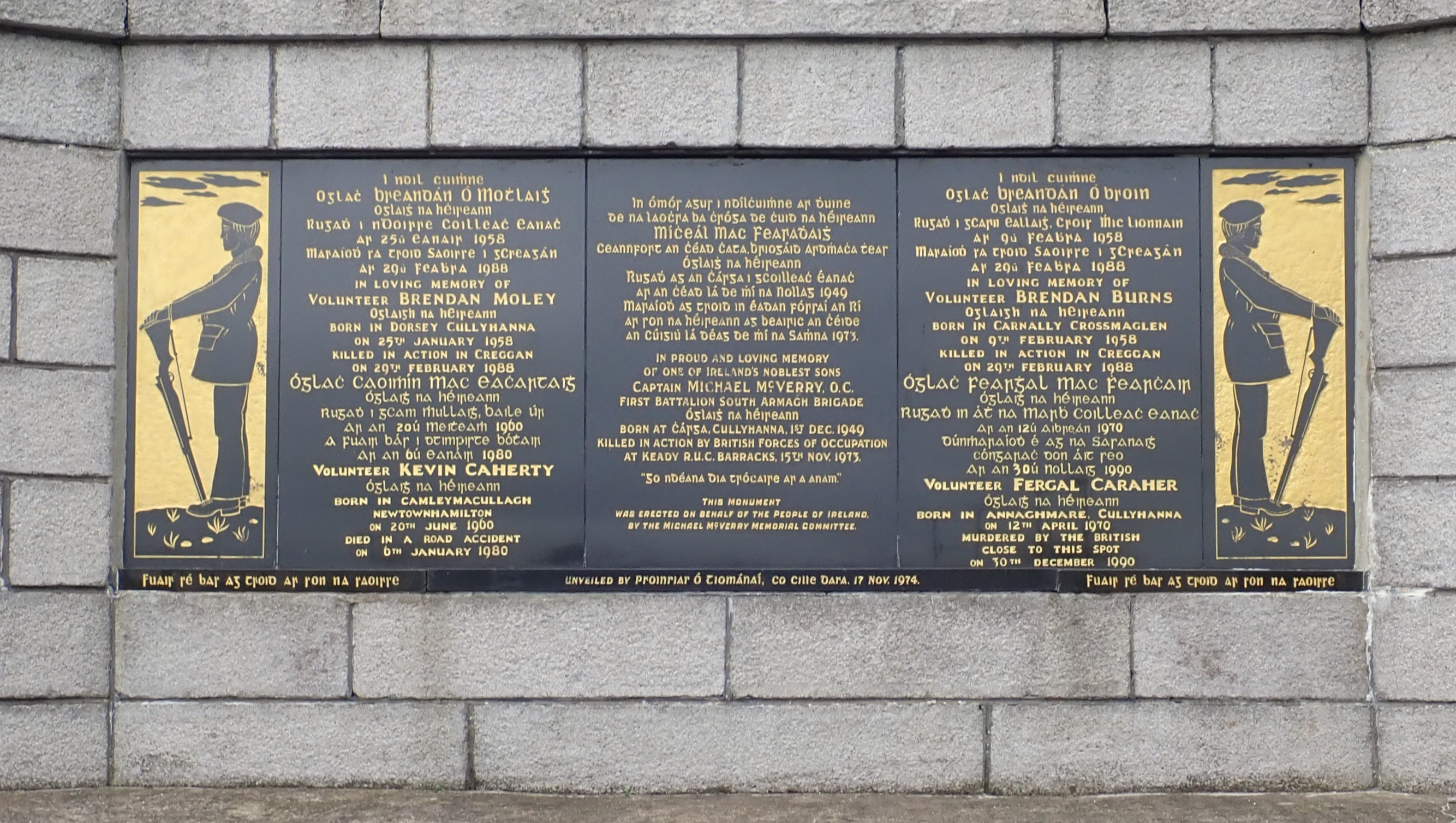
IRA memorial in Cullyhanna

The Troubles in Cullyhanna recounts incidents during, and the effects of, the Troubles in Cullyhanna, County Armagh, Northern Ireland.

Timeline of deadly incidents in Cullyhanna during the Troubles:

== 1972 ==
- 10 February 1972 - Ian Harris (26) and David Champ (23), both members of the British Army, were killed in a Provisional Irish Republican Army landmine attack on their mobile patrol at Cullyhanna.
- 20 November 1972 - William Watson (28) and James Strothers (31), both members of the British Army, were killed by a Provisional IRA booby-trap bomb in a derelict house in Cullyhanna.

== 1988 ==
- 28 July 1988 - Michael Matthews (37), member of the British Army, was killed by the explosion of a landmine planted by the Provisional IRA while on a joint RUC/Army foot patrol outside Cullyhanna

== 1990 ==
- 7 May 1990 - Graham Stewart (25), member of the British Army, was killed by machine gun fire from a Provisional IRA unit during Operation Conservation.
- 30 December 1990 - Fergal Caraher (20), Provisional IRA volunteer and member of Sinn Féin, shot and killed by Royal Marines while travelling in his car in Tullynavall Road, Cullyhanna.

== 1991 ==
- 17 August 1991 - Simon Ware (22), member of the British Army, killed by the explosion of a landmine planted by the Provisional IRA while on foot patrol at Carrickrovaddy, near Cullyhanna.

== See also ==
- Provisional IRA South Armagh Brigade
- Operation Conservation
