= Bernard Fox =

Bernard Fox may refer to:

- Bernard Fox (actor) (1927–2016), British film and television actor
- Bernard Fox (Irish republican) (born c. 1951), former member of the Army Council of the Provisional Irish Republican Army
- Bernard Fox (figure skater) (1916–1998), American figure skater
