= Gerard Davison =

Irish commander (1967–2015)

- Born: James Gerard Davison c. September 1967; Markets, Belfast, Northern Ireland
- Died: 5 May 2015 (aged 47); Markets, Belfast, Northern Ireland
- Burial place: Milltown Cemetery
- Children: 3
- Military career
- Paramilitary: Provisional IRA (1980s–2005); Direct Action Against Drugs (1995–2001)
- Rank: Officer Commanding
- Nickname: Jock
- Unit: Belfast Brigade
- Known for: Commander in the Provisional IRA & alleged involvement in the murder of Robert McCartney
- Conflicts: The Troubles

Gerard Davison (c. September 1967 – 5 May 2015) was an Irish militant who was a commander of the Provisional IRA. He was shot and killed on 5 May 2015. One of the first operations he was involved in was shooting dead of IPLO Belfast Brigade commander Sammy Ward during the same Night of the Long Knives in Belfast.

Davison was questioned about the murder of Robert McCartney in January 2005. He was released without charge. Davison was one of a number of Provisional IRA members to be expelled from the organisation in relation to the murder. Davison had been a community worker in the working class Markets area of Belfast.

== Death ==
Davison's grave in Milltown Cemetery, Belfast

On 5 May 2015 around 09:00, Davison was shot numerous times at the junction of Lower Stanfield Street and Welsh Street in the Markets area of south Belfast. While police did not identify who killed him, Kevin McGuigan, a former subordinate of Davison's within both the Provisional IRA and Direct Action Against Drugs, was named as the chief suspect after he was also shot dead, reportedly by members of the Provisional IRA, on 12 August 2015. Davidson and McGuigan fell out after Davison had ordered his punishment shooting, following a violent dispute between him and a veteran republican's family, in the early 2000s.

On the evening of the killing, The Guardian’s Henry McDonald reported: “Davison is the most senior pro-peace process republican to have been killed since the IRA ceasefire of 1997. Security sources said it was highly unlikely that any Ulster loyalist group was behind the murders, adding that the killers may instead have come from within the nationalist community, possibly from people who had a longstanding grudge against the victim.”

Following his arrest in Fuengirola in August 2021, it was revealed Gerry ‘The Monk’ Hutch was to be questioned in relation to a weapon used in Davison's killing.
