= Brian Keenan (Irish republican) =

Irish republican

Chief of Staff of the Provisional Irish Republican Army
- Preceded by: Thomas "Slab" Murphy
- Succeeded by: Unknown

Personal details
- Born: 17 July 1941 Draperstown, County Londonderry, Northern Ireland
- Died: 21 May 2008 (aged 66) Cullyhanna, South Armagh
- Cause of death: Cancer

Military service
- Branch/service: Provisional Irish Republican Army
- Battles/wars: The Troubles

Brian Paschal Keenan (17 July 1941 – 21 May 2008) was a member of the Army Council of the Provisional Irish Republican Army (IRA) who received an 18-year prison sentence in 1980 for conspiring to cause explosions, and played a key role in the Northern Ireland peace process.

== Early life ==
The son of a member of the Royal Air Force, Keenan was brought up in Swatragh, County Londonderry, before his family moved to Belfast. As a teenager, Keenan moved to England to find work, for a time working as a television repairman in partnership with his brother in Corby, Northamptonshire. During this time he came to the attention of the police when he damaged a cigarette machine, which led to police having his fingerprints on file. Keenan returned to Northern Ireland when the Troubles began, and started working at the Grundig factory in the Finaghy area of Belfast where he acquired a reputation as a radical due to his involvement in factory trade union activities.

== IRA activity ==
Despite his family having no history of republicanism, Keenan joined the Provisional Irish Republican Army in 1970 or 1971, and by August 1971 was the quartermaster of the Belfast Brigade. Keenan was an active IRA member, planning bombings in Belfast and travelling abroad to make political contacts and arrange arms smuggling, acquiring contacts in East Germany, Libya, Lebanon and Syria. In 1972, Keenan travelled to Tripoli to meet with Libyan leader Muammar Gaddafi in order to acquire arms and finance from his government. In early 1973 Keenan took over responsibility for control of the IRA's bombing campaign in England and also became IRA Quartermaster General. In late 1973 Keenan was the linchpin of the kidnap of his former employer at Grundig, director Thomas Niedermayer.

In early 1974, Keenan planned to break Gerry Adams and Ivor Bell out of Long Kesh using a helicopter, in a method similar to Seamus Twomey's escape from Mountjoy Prison in October 1973, but the plan was vetoed by Billy McKee. Keenan was arrested in the Republic of Ireland in mid-1974 and sentenced to twelve months imprisonment for IRA membership. On 17 March 1975 he was shot and wounded while attempting to lead a mass escape from Portlaoise Prison. While being held in Long Kesh, Gerry Adams helped to devise a blueprint for the reorganisation of the IRA, which included the use of covert cells and the establishment of a Southern Command and Northern Command. As the architects of the blueprint—Adams, Bell and Brendan Hughes—were still imprisoned, Martin McGuinness and Keenan toured the country trying to convince the IRA Army Council and middle leadership of the benefits of the restructuring plan, with one IRA member remarking "Keenan was a roving ambassador for Adams". The proposal was accepted after Keenan won support from the South Derry Brigade, East Tyrone Brigade and South Armagh Brigade, with one IRA member saying "Keenan was really the John the Baptist to Adams' Christ".

In December 1975, members of an IRA unit based in London were arrested following the six-day Balcombe Street Siege. The IRA unit had been active in England since late 1974 carrying out a series of bombings, and a few months after his release from prison Keenan visited the unit in Crouch Hill, London, to give it further instructions. In follow-up raids after the siege, police discovered crossword puzzles in his handwriting and his fingerprints on a list of bomb parts. A warrant was issued for his arrest.

Garda Síochána informer Sean O'Callaghan claimed that Keenan recommended IRA Chief of Staff Seamus Twomey to authorise an attack on Ulster Protestants in retaliation to an increase in sectarian attacks on Catholic civilians by Protestant loyalist paramilitaries, such as the killing of three Catholics in a gun and bomb attack by the Ulster Volunteer Force on Donnelly's Bar in Silverbridge, County Armagh on 19 December 1975. According to O'Callaghan "Keenan believed that the only way, in his words, to put the nonsense out of the Prods [Protestants] was to just hit back much harder and more savagely than them". Soon after the sectarian Kingsmill massacre occurred, when ten Protestant men returning home from their work were ordered out of a minibus they were travelling in, and executed en masse with a machine gun on 5 January 1976.

== Arrest and imprisonment ==
Keenan was arrested on the basis of the 1975 warrant near Banbridge on 20 March 1979 when the Royal Ulster Constabulary stopped two cars travelling north on the main road from Dublin to Belfast, and was extradited to England to face charges relating to the Balcombe Street Gang's campaign in England. The capture of Keenan was a blow to the IRA, in particular as he was carrying an address book listing his contacts including Palestinian activists in the United Kingdom. The IRA responded by despatching Bobby Storey and three other members to break Keenan out of prison using a helicopter, but all four were arrested and remanded to Brixton Prison. Keenan stood trial at the Old Bailey in London in June 1980 defended by Michael Mansfield, and was accused of organising the IRA's bombings in England and being implicated in the deaths of eight people including Ross McWhirter and Gordon Hamilton-Fairley. Keenan was sentenced to eighteen years imprisonment after being found guilty on 25 June 1980.

Keenan continued to support Gerry Adams while in prison. In August 1982 Adams was granted permission by the IRA's Army Council to stand in a forthcoming election to the Northern Ireland Assembly, having been refused permission at a meeting the previous month. In a letter sent from Leicester Prison Keenan wrote that he "emphatically" supported the move and endorsed the Army Council's decision, saying:

It is not enough for Republicans to say, with reference to the Army [IRA], actions speak louder than words. We must never forsake action but the final war to win will be the savage war of peace. To those of us who have struggled for years in a purely military capacity, it must be obvious that if we do not provide honest, recognisable political leadership on the ground, we will lose that war for peace.

== Peace process ==
Keenan was released from prison in June 1993 and by 1996 was one of seven members of the IRA's Army Council. Following the events after the IRA's ceasefire of August 1994 he had been openly critical of Gerry Adams and the "tactical use of armed struggle", or TUAS, strategy employed by the republican movement. After the Northern Ireland peace process had become deadlocked over the issue of the IRA decommissiong its arms, Keenan and the other members of the Army Council authorised the Docklands bombing which killed two people and marked the end of the IRA's eighteen-month ceasefire in February 1996.

Keenan outlined the IRA's public position in May 1996 at a ceremony in memory of hunger striker Seán McCaughey at Milltown Cemetery, where he stated "The IRA will not be defeated...Republicans will have our victory...Do not be confused about decommissioning. The only thing the Republican movement will accept is the decommissioning of the British state in this country". In the same speech he accused the British of "double-dealing" and denounced the Irish government as "spineless".

In November 1998 Keenan addressed a republican rally in Cullyhanna, County Armagh to mark the 25th anniversary of the death of IRA member Michael McVerry. He stated:

I can categorically state the only time the IRA will decommission, we will decommission in agreement with a government of national democracy, a government that derives from the first Dáil. That's when we will decommission—never, ever before...Everybody's saying: 'The prisoners are being released, what's your problem?' Well there's no prisoner was ever in jail to be let out to sell out the struggle and I'm sure none of them would want to be let out if this struggle wasn't going the whole way.

Keenan continued by saying that if republican demands were not met then British Prime Minister Tony Blair would be responsible for the consequences, and went on to say:

So in the future maybe the jails are going to be full again...If our enemies don't want peace, there can only be one conclusion: they must want war. We don't want to go back to that. But let there be no mistake: if we don't get equality and if the reasons for conflict are still there...then the waiting time will soon draw to a close and republicans will once again have to do anything that is necessary to get a Republic, because that's the goal.

On 25 February 2001 Keenan addressed a republican rally in Creggan, County Armagh, saying that republicans should not fear "this phase" of "the revolution" collapsing should the Good Friday Agreement fail. Keenan confirmed his continued commitment to the Armalite and ballot box strategy, saying that both political negotiations and violence were "legitimate forms of revolution" and that both "have to be prosecuted to the utmost". Keenan went on to say "The revolution can never be over until we have British imperialism where it belongs—in the dustbin of history", a message aimed at preventing rank-and-file IRA activists defecting to the dissident Real IRA.

Keenan played a key role in the peace process, acting as the IRA's go-between with the Independent International Commission on Decommissioning. Gerry Adams remarked "There wouldn't be a peace process if it wasn't for Brian Keenan". Keenan resigned from his position on the Army Council in 2005 due to ill-health, and was replaced by Bernard Fox, who had taken part in the 1981 Irish hunger strike. On 6 May 2007 Keenan was guest speaker at a rally in Cappagh, County Tyrone to commemorate the 20th anniversary of the deaths of the so-called "Loughgall Martyrs", eight members of the IRA East Tyrone Brigade killed by the Special Air Service in 1987.

== Provisional IRA Chief of Staff ==
It is alleged by the Irish Independent and The Daily Telegraph that Keenan succeeded Thomas "Slab" Murphy as Chief of Staff of the Provisional IRA at some point between the late 1990s and the mid-2000s before he relinquished the role to deal with his poor health caused by cancer.

== Death ==
Keenan died of cancer on 21 May 2008 in Cullyhanna, South Armagh.
