= Punishment attack =

Punishment attack may refer to:

- Punitive raid by a military force
- Paramilitary punishment attacks in Northern Ireland

== See also ==
- Extrajudicial punishment
- Corporal punishment
