= Thams =

Thams is a surname. Notable people with the surname include:

- Christian Thams (1867–1948), Norwegian architect, industrialist, businessman and diplomat
- Jacob Tullin Thams (1898–1954), Norwegian ski jumper and sailor
- Marentius Thams (1836–1907), Norwegian merchant and industrialist

== See also ==
- Tham, another surname
