= John Grieve (police officer) =

British police officer and university professor

Commander John Gilbert Dickie Grieve CBE QPM (born 1946) is a British retired police officer and university professor who is a member of the Independent Monitoring Commission that monitors the Northern Ireland peace process. He was named Commander of Order of the British Empire (CBE) in 1999 as part of the Millennium Honours list.

Grieve became a police officer in 1966, when he joined the Metropolitan Police Service at Clapham in South London. His assignments included work as a detective in South London, as a senior investigator, and Divisional Commander at Bethnal Green in the East End of London. He was the first Director of Intelligence for the Metropolitan Police. In 1997 he was awarded the Queen's Police Medal (QPM). He served as Director of the Racial and Violent Crime Task Force from 1998 until his retirement in 2002.

He holds an Honours Degree in Philosophy from Newcastle University and a master's degree from Cranfield University.

Grieve was head of training at Hendon Police College and is an emeritus professor at London Metropolitan University. He is chairman of the John Grieve Centre for Policing and Community Safety at London Metropolitan University. The centre was established at Buckinghamshire Chilterns University College in 2003 and moved to London Metropolitan University in 2006. Staff from the Centre have lectured overseas to the military forces of a number of countries including Turkey, Russia, Kyrgyzstan, USA and Serbia. The centre has also provided training on press and public relations to senior police officers of the People's Republic of China.

In January 2004 the British government formally appointed him as a member of the Independent Monitoring Commission for Northern Ireland.

== Books ==
- John Grieve, Allyson MacVean, Clive Harfield and David Phillips. Handbook of Intelligent Policing. Oxford University Press. October 2008. ISBN 978-0-19-953312-1, ISBN 0-19-953312-1. 368 pages
