= Tham =

Tham is a surname. Notable people with the surname include:

- Carl Tham (born 1939), Swedish politician
- Hilary Tham (1946–2005), Malaysian-born American poet
- Jason Tham, Indian dancer, choreographer and actor
- Jennifer Tham (born 1962), Singaporean choir conductor and music pedagogue
- Lottie Tham (born 1949), Swedish heiress and businesswoman
- Michael Rudy Tham (1923?–1998), American boxer and trade unionist
- Peter Tham (born 1948), Singaporean stockbroker
- Vollrath Tham (1913–1995), Swedish Army officer

== See also ==
- Tham script (Tai Tham / Lanna)
- Thams, another surname
- Carboprost
