= Unhappy the Land =

2016 book by Liam Kennedy

Unhappy the Land: The Most Oppressed People Ever, the Irish?
- Author: Liam Kennedy
- Publisher: Merrion Press
- Publication date: 2016

Unhappy the Land: The Most Oppressed People Ever, the Irish? is a 2016 book by Liam Kennedy, professor emeritus at Queen's University, Belfast. Kennedy introduces, as well as criticizes, the concept of "most oppressed people ever" (MOPE) to describe what he sees as a pervasive assumption both among Irish nationalists and the Irish diaspora that Irish people have been uniquely victimised throughout history. Throughout the book he plays devil's advocate while questioning many truisms he perceives as being commonly accepted about Irish history.

== Contents ==
The title comes from Bertolt Brecht's aphorism that "Unhappy the land that is in need of heroes". It is meant somewhat ironically as Kennedy argues against the idea that Ireland is especially unhappy. Kennedy introduces the idea of "most oppressed people ever" (MOPE) in the first chapter, an idea which he believes is the master narrative for Northern Ireland. According to him, “This beguiling framework, which speaks as much to the emotions as to reason, has been enormously influential in shaping historical thought on Ireland, both at the level of folk history and academic writing.” The first part of the book is explicitly comparative, arguing that the British government did not suppress the Irish language and traditions as much as far-right and fascist governments in continental Europe dealt with minorities. Another chapter is focused on criticising analogies between the Great Famine and the Holocaust. Kennedy argues that those who make this analogy are typically vague, as specific parallels do not exist. Instead, the genocide allegations were invented to support the Irish nationalist narrative.

The book is not meant to be comprehensive, but supplies plenty of examples to support his thesis. Another of Kennedy's aims is to question the traditional model of mutually antagonistic Catholic and Protestant communities, in favour of pluralism. He is critical of both unionist and nationalist historiography, coming to similar conclusions about the Proclamation of the Irish Republic and the contemporaneous Ulster Covenant, which he says are "manipulative documents... replete with contradictions, evasions and silences... Each has its quotient of make-believe". He also questions whether a "War of Independence" really took place in Ireland, as it continued to have close ties with the United Kingdom, which was also the main destination of Irish emigrants. He also considers that it is more accurate to consider it a civil conflict between nationalists and unionists that was dealt with as a police action by the British. Full-scale war was prevented by public opinion in Britain, which opposed keeping Ireland in the Union by force.

== Reception ==
According to a favourable Irish Times review, "Kennedy seems to regard the historian’s role as somewhere between professional sceptic, state pathologist and investigative journalist". A review in the Irish Examiner describes the book as "a seminal book that poses fundamental questions about the social and political history of Ireland", although it is critical of Kennedy's "unprofessional" dismissal of Tim Pat Coogan's The Famine Plot. Irish senator Maurice Hayes said that the book "slaughters almost every sacred cow in sight, from the Famine to the Rising, the Ulster Covenant and the Proclamation of the Republic, the Troubles (however labelled retrospectively) and the Civil War". Ruth Dudley Edwards recommended giving a copy to then-Sinn Féin leader Gerry Adams, who, she says, clings to the MOPE mentality "like a comfort blanket".

In an academic review, Professor Penelope Corfield lauds the book for being "Sombre in subject matter, lucid in approach, impressive in range, brilliant in insights, sturdy in documentation, judicious in tone, coolly courageous in its willingness to debunk stereotypes". She writes that the book should be required reading not just for Irish historians but for all those who study human disasters and historical memory. Writing in Irish Studies Review, Ian Miller calls Unhappy the Land "an intriguing book that sets out to challenge, provoke and presumably annoy many of its readers". He states that it is well-written, thoroughly researched, and convincing.
