= Silke (surname) =

Silke is a surname. Notable people with the surname include:

- Andrew Silke, British scholar of terrorism
- Ray Silke (born 1970), Irish footballer
- Seán Silke (born 1950), Irish hurler
