= Thomas Niedermayer =

German businessman and honorary consul (1928–1973)

- Born: 8 March 1928; Bamberg, Bavaria, Germany
- Died: 30 December 1973 (aged 45); Belfast, Northern Ireland
- Body discovered: 11 March 1980
- Occupation: Industrialist
- Spouse: Ingeborg Niedermayer
- Children: 2

Thomas Niedermayer, OBE (8 March 1928 – 30 December 1973) was a German industrialist who was kidnapped and killed by the Provisional IRA in December 1973. Niedermayer was the managing director of the Grundig factory in Belfast, Northern Ireland.

== Background ==
Niedermayer was born to a working-class family in 1928 in the city of Bamberg in Bavarian Franconia. After leaving school, he worked as an aircraft mechanic in Friedrichshafen and Karlsruhe. He retrained as a toolmaker and was a foreman by the age of 18. In 1952, he married Ingeborg Tramowsky, also from Bamberg, born to a refugee family from former German East Prussia.

In 1953, Niedermayer was promoted to management as assistant to the director of an electronics company. In 1955, aged just 27, he entered higher management at the Nuremberg headquarters of Grundig, then one of the major names in consumer electronics in Europe. In 1961, he moved with his family to be the general manager of that company’s new plant in Belfast, the first it had established outside Germany. He also served as the West German honorary consul to Northern Ireland.

== Abduction ==
Niedermayer was kidnapped on 27 December 1973, at around 11 pm, from his home in the Glengoland area of Suffolk in West Belfast. Two IRA members lured him outside his house on the pretext that they had accidentally crashed into his car. The abduction incident was witnessed by his younger daughter, who had answered the door to the two men.

The Government of the United Kingdom denied at the time that it had received any demands from the IRA in relation to the kidnapping. However, several years later it was revealed that the UK government had briefly attempted to negotiate with the IRA, seeking the safe return of Niedermayer in exchange for the transfer of two IRA members, sisters Dolours Price and Marion Price, from prison in England to Northern Ireland. The two women had been jailed for involvement in a bombing campaign in London in 1973. Negotiations were ended abruptly by the IRA, without explanation.

On 30 December 1973, while held captive, Niedermayer saw a British Army patrol and attempted to shout for help. He was stopped by four IRA members, beaten, and struck on the head with the butt of a pistol. His captors tied him up in order to subdue him, but he continued to struggle before his captors saw him go limp and realised he had died. Niedermayer was secretly buried in a shallow grave the following day.

Nearly seven years later, on 11 March 1980, the Royal Ulster Constabulary, acting on information received, located Niedermayer's body lying face down and gagged, with hands tied, buried in an embankment at Colin Glen. A post-mortem revealed two skull fractures, one of which was consistent with being assaulted with a Browning pistol. The autopsy was unable to determine whether his death was caused by one or both of the skull fractures, a heart attack, or asphyxiation.

His funeral took place at Dunmurry and he was buried in the church's graveyard.

== Criminal trial ==
Eugene McManus (IRA Belfast Brigade Adjutant in 1973) and 42-year-old John Bradley (also an IRA member) were charged in connection with the crime. Bradley was originally charged with murder, but at his trial in 1981 he pleaded guilty to manslaughter, stating that he had accidentally killed Niedermayer whilst he was trying to escape. McManus pleaded guilty to withholding information about the crime and IRA membership. Bradley was subsequently sentenced to twenty years' imprisonment, and McManus to five years' imprisonment.

Information later obtained by the Royal Ulster Constabulary revealed that the kidnapping operation had been orchestrated by Brian Keenan, a former employee of the Belfast Grundig factory where Niedermayer had been general manager. Keenan, as a trade union representative, had had several confrontations with Niedermayer.

== Subsequent events ==
Niedermayer's wife, Ingeborg, returned to Ireland in 1990, ten years to the day after her husband's funeral, and booked into a hotel in Bray, where she died by suicide by walking into the sea from an isolated beach. Niedermayer's two daughters, Renate and Gabrielle, also died by suicide, in 1991 and 1994 respectively, with Renate dying in South Africa and Gabrielle in England. Gabrielle's husband, Robin Williams-Powell, killed himself five years later in 1999. Gabrielle and Robin are survived by their two daughters, Tanya and Rachel.

The crime and its aftermath is the subject of the 2023 documentary film Face Down, directed by Gerry Gregg.

== See also ==
- Tiede Herrema, a Dutch businessman kidnapped in 1975, rescued after a two-week-long hostage siege
- John Hely-Hutchinson, 7th Earl of Donoughmore, kidnapped along with his wife in 1974, both released unharmed
- List of kidnappings, 1950 to 1979
