= Murder of Joseph Rafferty =

2005 Murder in Ireland

- Murder of Joseph Rafferty (Dublin) Murder of Joseph Rafferty (Ireland)
- Date: 12 April 2005; 21 years ago
- Location: Hayworth Court apartment complex, Ongar, Dublin; 53.393795°N 6.436314°W
- Cause: Shooting
- Perpetrator: Provisional Irish Republican Army (suspected)
- Deaths: 1

Joseph Rafferty (c. 1974 – 12 April 2005) was an Irish murder victim. Following the assault of Rafferty's sister Carmel at a party, Rafferty confronted the alleged attacker, who reportedly told him that his family had connections to the "IRA" and could get him killed. Rafferty continued to receive threats that the Provisional IRA (PIRA) would get him for several months before his killing.

The Rafferty family met with Daithí Doolan, the local Sinn Féin representative, asking him to have the threat stopped. On 12 April 2005, Rafferty was shot twice with a sawn-off shotgun, once in the leg and once in the chest, as he left his flat in at the Hayworth Court apartment complex in Ongar, Dublin to go to work.

Then Taoiseach Bertie Ahern stated in September 2005 that he was satisfied that there was no official involvement from the IRA. Ahern stated the murder was committed by "Elements, probably of criminality, claim[ing] they had links with republicans." Both Doolan and Gerry Adams have called for co-operation with the Garda in the investigation of Rafferty's murder. Adams stated he would be willing to meet with members of the Rafferty family.

The tenth and twelfth reports of the Independent Monitoring Commission (IMC), released in April and October 2006 respectively, contain a table on the number of murders believed to be linked to paramilitary groups between March 2003 and August 2006. While Rafferty's murder is not included in the table, a footnote states that "a member or former member of PIRA may have been involved", and that while the IMC have no reason to believe the attack was carried out by the PIRA, they believe that members of Sinn Féin and the PIRA "were aware in advance of the threat and did not take sufficient action to prevent it."

Rafferty's other sister, Esther Uzell-Rafferty, said "It's what we have been saying all along. We've never said [the murder] was sanctioned by the IRA's top man, but other Sinn Féin members knew it was going to happen and did nothing about it." Uzell-Rafferty ran as an independent candidate in the 2007 Irish general election for Dublin South-East to call on Daithí Doolan to fully co-operate with the Garda investigation into her brother's killing. In 2007 results, she received 673 first preference votes.

Rafferty's family have stated there are similarities between the murder of Rafferty and that of Robert McCartney.

== See also ==
- Murder of Andrew Kearney
- Murder of Paul Quinn
