= Charles Peto Bennett =

English timber merchant and company director (1856–1940)

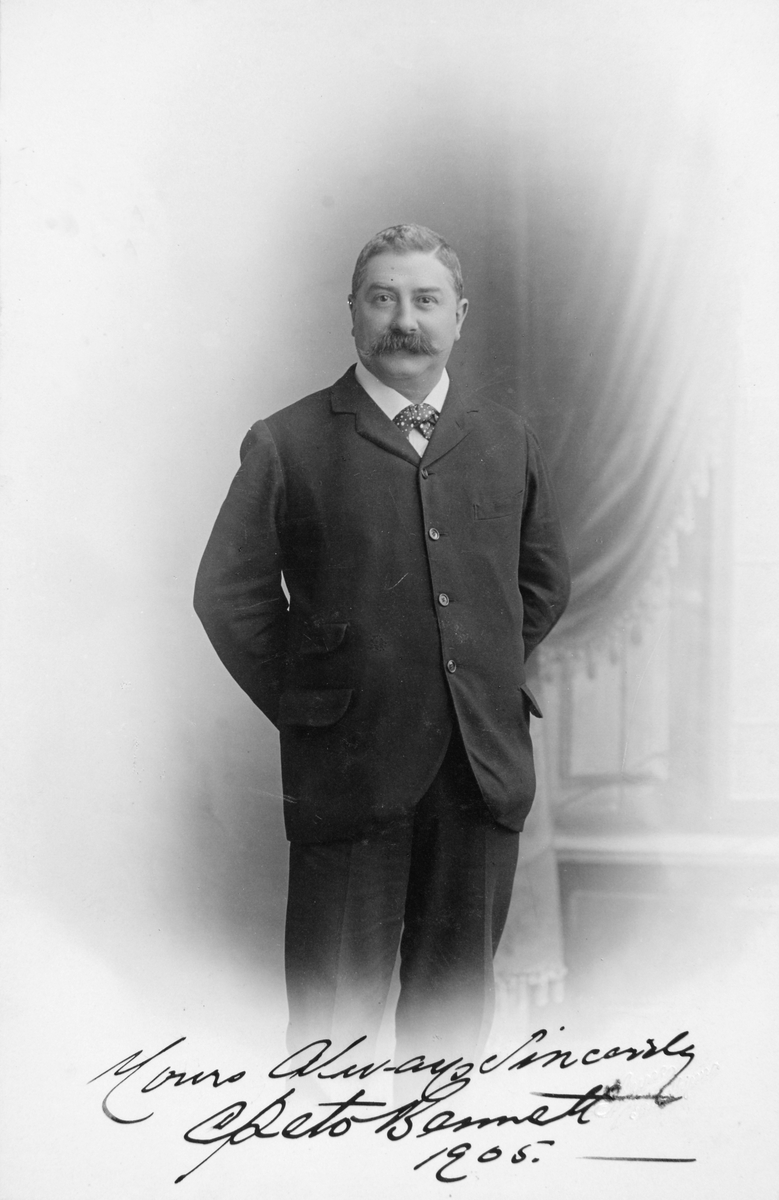
Charles Peto Bennett, 1905 photograph

Charles Peto Bennett (1856–1940) was an English timber merchant and company director of Lombard Street, London. He was a business partner of Alfred Baldwin Raper and an associate of Marentius Thams of Trondheim.

== Life ==
Charles Peto Bennett was the son and nephew of merchants in mahogany; his father had warehouses on the River Thames. He set up in business in Lombard Street in 1877. A timber import partnership with Lars August Brolin was dissolved in 1890. Bennett was also involved in the 1890 bankruptcy of the timber merchant Arthur Henry Lilley, trading as Lilley, Bennett & Co. from 27 Lombard Street, in debt to Brolin, Bennett & Co.

== Boxboard ==
In 1887 Bennett became a director of Myers Patent Box, a company set up to automate production of wooden boxes and barrels, which took over the going concern at the Invicta Works, Bow Common of the cork merchants L. Lumley & Co. A 1916 advertisement for C. Peto Bennett of London and Liverpool offered "Box Shooks for Shell Cases, Ammunition, Ration, Bacon, Biscuit, Rum, Jam, Petroleum, Clothing, Tea, and all other Boxes." By 1919 they had a reputation as clearly the largest British importer of box shooks (i.e. slats), for the manufacture of wooden boxes.

C. Peto Bennett was the UK agent for boxes from Färjenäs Aktiebolag (sv:Färjenäs Snickerifabrik) of Gothenburg. The company also represented S. A. Woods Machine Co. of Boston.

== Borneo ==
Around 1890 Bennett visited British North Borneo, and set up there North Borneo Rubber Estates, Ltd., which he ran for many years. E. Peto Bennett of 27 Lombard Street was in 1891 handling a cargo of Borneo hardwoods.

== Western Australia ==
Bennett became a director on the 1897 launch of Jarrahdale Jarrah Forests & Railways Ltd. It went into voluntary liquidation in 1901, Bennett being one of the liquidators. Eight Jarrahdale timber companies were in 1902 consolidated into Millars of Western Australia. Bennett was a director of Millars, and in 1914 and 1924 a director of Millars Timber & Trading Co., a successor company. He had visited Western Australia in 1906 with Leama Robert Davies of London, another director of Millars and son of Maurice Coleman Davies, a founder of the timber industry there. In an interview for The West Australian, Bennett commented on the economics of jarrah (Eucalyptus marginata), used for railway sleepers in India, and karri (Eucalyptus diversicolor).

== Other interests ==
Other directorships (1914) held by Bennett were in Argentine Hardwoods & Lands Co. Ltd., Bode Rubber Estates Ltd., and Dominica Forests & Sawmills, Ltd. In 1921 Alfred Baldwin Raper was a partner in C. Peto Bennett and a director of Dominica Forests & Sawmills. The partnership was dissolved in 1929.

In 1927 Bennett was also a director of Tuaran Rubber Estates, Ltd. That year The Californian Lumber Merchant reported on the month-long visit Bennett made to the Philippines with honorary consul Niels Christian Gude. Millars Timber & Trading Co. had two large subsidiaries in Manila.

== Collector ==
By 1908, Bennett owned the Southern Cross pearl formation, of nine pearls, which was shown at the Franco-British Exhibition. It was on display again at the British Empire Exhibition in 1924.

Bennett bought pictures by Adriaen van de Velde, Paulus Potter and Frans van Mieris the Elder in or shortly after 1928.

== Family ==
Bennett married Kristine Elisabeth Gudde, known as "Kiss" (1886–1982), from Trondheim when she was 17. They had two sons.

In 1912, Kiss met polar explorer Roald Amundsen in London, and they began a relationship. In 1918, Amundsen's properties at Svartskog were signed over to Kiss before he left on the Maud expedition, an attempt to reach the North Pole via the Northeast Passage. One of the expedition’s aircraft was called Kristine, and Amundsen named a small peak on Cape Chelyuskin after her.

Bennett's elder son Alfred Edwin Peto Bennett (1905–1996) was born in Cobham, Surrey. He married in 1935 Helle Huitfeldt, co-owner of the Norwegian media business Schibsted. As a great-granddaughter of Christian Schibsted, she held one-sixth of the company.

His second son (Charles) Peto Bennett (1906–1978) was born in Perth, Western Australia. His roles in the RAF and the military mission to Norway in 1945 were recognised by the awards of the Order of the British Empire and the King Haakon VII Freedom Cross. His daughter Anne Christine married in 1962 Sir Richard Baker Wilbraham, 8th Baronet.

Bennett's great-granddaughter Tilly (Matilde) Culme-Seymour wrote a family memoir, Island Summers (2013) about Småholmene, a small island in the Skaggerak.
