= IRA Army Council =

Decision-making body of the Provisional IRA

Army Council
- Irish Republican Army - Army Council
- A Provisional IRA badge, with the phoenix symbolising the group's origins.
- Predecessor: Army Council (1922–1969)
- Formation: December 1969; Current status: On ceasefire (see more)
- Purpose: General staff
- Origins: IRA split
- Chief of Staff: Seán Mac Stíofáin (first)
- Main organ: Provisional IRA

The IRA Army Council was the decision-making body of the Provisional Irish Republican Army, a paramilitary group dedicated to bringing about independence to the whole island of Ireland and the end of the Union between Northern Ireland and Great Britain. The Council had seven members, said by the British and Irish governments to have included Gerry Adams, the longtime president of Sinn Féin. The Independent Monitoring Commission declared in 2008 that the council was "no longer operational or functional," but that it had not dissolved.

== Background ==
=== Origins ===
The Army Council of the IRA split in December 1969 and a "Provisional" Army Council emerged as the head of the newly formed Provisional Irish Republican Army.

=== Legal status ===
The IRA was a proscribed organization under the terms of the Offences Against the State Acts passed between 1939 and 1998 in the Republic of Ireland and under equivalent anti-terrorist legislation in the United Kingdom, making membership of it a criminal offence. In the Republic, trials for membership take place in the Special Criminal Court (where three judges hear cases without a jury, on the evidence of a Garda superintendent or higher rank) and carries a maximum penalty of five years' imprisonment.

=== Relationship with Sinn Féin ===
Senior members of Sinn Féin have been alleged to sit on the Army Council. On 20 February 2005 during a radio interview, Irish Justice Minister Michael McDowell publicly named Martin Ferris, Gerry Adams, and Martin McGuinness, Sinn Féin's chief negotiator, as members of the Army Council. The three men issued a statement the next day denying the allegation.

On 27 July 2005, McDowell expressed his belief that Adams, McGuinness, and Ferris had recently (within the previous few days) left the IRA Army Council. However he also said that it was his opinion that this by itself did not necessarily amount to a permanent split between the two organisations.

On 20 October 2015, the Assessment on Paramilitary Groups in Northern Ireland, commissioned by the Secretary of State for Northern Ireland on the structure, role and purpose of paramilitary organisations reported that the structures of the IRA remain in existence "in a much reduced form", including "a senior leadership, the 'Provisional Army Council' and some 'departments'", but that they are not recruiting members. It concluded that the IRA still has access to some weapons, but have not sought to procure more since at least 2011. It also said that IRA members believe the Army Council oversees both the IRA and Sinn Féin.

== Membership ==
In May 2005, The Sunday Times reported that the following changes were made to the IRA Army Council:

- Bernard Fox replaced Brian Keenan
- Brian Arthurs and Sean Murray were named as possible replacements for Gerry Adams
- Martin Lynch replaced Martin McGuinness
- Martin Ferris was also reported to have stepped down

The Sunday Times reported in July 2005 that security sources believed that the current Army Council consisted of:

- Thomas Murphy, chief of staff
- Brian Arthurs, Commander, Provisional IRA East Tyrone Brigade
- Bernard Fox, a former hunger striker (on 24 September 2006, The Sunday Times reported that Fox had resigned from the Army Council)
- Sean Murray, from Belfast, OC of Northern Command
- Martin Lynch, Adjutant-general, an Adams supporter from Belfast
- Brian Gillen, from Belfast
- A Dublin man who was not named for legal reasons

== See also ==
- Chief of Staff of the Irish Republican Army, listing Chiefs of Staff from 1917
- Continuity Army Council
- Irish republican legitimism
