= Liam Kennedy (historian) =

Irish historian

Liam Kennedy is an Irish historian, emeritus professor of history at Queen's University Belfast.

== Biography ==
Liam Kennedy was born in rural County Tipperary.

Originally from Borrisoleigh, he was educated at the Cistercian College boarding school in Roscrea. He attended the University College Cork, where he became active in the Labour Party and edited some of the school magazines with an ultra-left perspective on Irish politics and international politics. Kennedy did a science and economics degree to begin with, and then he formally studied history, including Irish history, at the University of York. He moved to Northern Ireland in the late 1970s.

His formative intellectual influences included Raymond Crotty, (Irish agricultural production), John Hicks (A theory of economic history), Edna O'Brien (The country girls), and the Tipperary Star. In 2005 he held a visiting professorship at the University of Toronto. He is currently emeritus professor of economic history at QUB and a member of the Royal Irish Academy.

In 2005, Kennedy stood against Gerry Adams as an independent candidate for Belfast West, to protest against IRA violence, especially paramilitary punishment attacks. He finished last, with 147 votes on a seven party ticket just below John Lowry (Workers Party) on 432 votes, and Lynda Gilby (Vote for Yourself Rainbow Dream Ticket) on 154 votes. He has called for a commission of inquiry into punishment attacks, which he considers a form of child abuse, considering that many victims are minors and some younger than 14. According to Kennedy, Sinn Féin is involved in the attacks, which the party denies.

Kennedy's look at Irish history, Unhappy the Land: The Most Oppressed People Ever, the Irish?, was published in 2016 to favourable reviews.

== Bibliography ==
- Two Ulsters: A Case for Repartition (1986)
- People and Population Change: A Comparative Study of Population Change in Northern Ireland and the Republic of Ireland (1994)
- Colonialism, Religion and Nationalism in Ireland (1997)
- Irish Agriculture - A Price History: from the Mid-eighteenth Century to the End of the First World War (2007) (with Peter M. Solar)
- Unhappy the Land: The Most Oppressed People Ever, the Irish?(2016)
- Who Was Responsible for the Troubles?: The Northern Ireland Conflict (2020)
- The Irish Religious Censuses of the 1760s: Catholics and Protestants in 18th Century Ireland (2022) (with Brian Gurrin and Kerby A. Miller)
- The Death Census of Black '47: Eyewitness Accounts of the Great Irish Famine (2023) (with Donald M. MacRaild, Lewis Darwen, Brian Gurrin)

=== Edited By ===
- Economic Theory of Co-Operative Enterprises: Selected Readings (1983)
- An Economic History of Ulster, 1820-1939 (1985) (edited by Liam Kennedy and Philip Ollerenshaw)
- Ulster Since 1600: Politics, Economy, and Society (2012) (edited by Liam Kennedy and Philip Ollerenshaw)
