= Murder of Paul Quinn =

2007 murder in Northern Ireland

Paul Quinn
- Born: Cullyhanna, County Armagh, Northern Ireland
- Died: 20 October 2007 (aged 21); Drogheda, County Louth, Ireland
- Cause of death: Murder (blunt force trauma)
- Known for: Victim of an unsolved murder

On 20 October 2007, Paul Quinn, a 21‑year‑old lorry driver from Cullyhanna, County Armagh, Northern Ireland, was murdered after being lured to a farm at Tullycoora, a townland near Oram, County Monaghan in the Republic of Ireland. His family later accused the Provisional Irish Republican Army of responsibility, though no one has ever been convicted in relation to his death.

== Background ==
Paul Quinn was from Cullyhanna, a village in the south of County Armagh, and was the youngest of the three children of Stephen and Breege Quinn. He was employed as a lorry driver and also handled machinery on construction sites.

== Murder ==
On 20 October 2007, Quinn was lured to a farm at Tullycoora, near the village of Oram in County Monaghan, where three of his friends were being held hostage. When he arrived, a group of some ten or more men beat him with iron and nail-studded bars for upwards of half an hour, breaking every major bone in his body. He was taken at around 18:00 to Our Lady of Lourdes Hospital, Drogheda, where he died two hours later, aged 21.

== Accusations of Quinn family ==
Quinn's parents have said that members of the Provisional IRA's South Armagh Brigade were responsible. Their son had had "run-ins with the Cullyhanna ASU on a number of occasions", and had "floored" the son of one of the active service unit (ASU) leaders in a pub row. Following the incident, the mother of the young man appeared at Quinn's family home with a hammer in her hand and told the family their son would have to leave Ireland. Quinn's murder is believed to have arisen as a result of a dispute between Quinn and the local Provisional IRA.

== IMC report ==
In November 2007, the Independent Monitoring Commission's John Grieve, stated that "We do believe that those involved ... included people who are members or former members, or have associations with members or former members, of the Provisional IRA." However, the report also found that there was no evidence that the organisation's leadership orchestrated or had any knowledge of the killing.

== Further reports ==
An Irish Independent report of September 2007 stated:

The people believed locally to have been responsible for directing the murder of Paul Quinn, who had every major bone in his body broken in a prolonged beating with iron bars and pickaxe handles by nine men, are brothers, both long-serving IRA men who are heavily involved in fuel smuggling. They are also closely associated with Thomas Murphy, the local IRA boss who holds sway over what is now a crime empire in the border area.

In October 2011, his parents were featured in an RTÉ news report, stating they still believe people living locally "know all about" the murder and have called on them to go to the Garda Síochána or the Police Service of Northern Ireland (PSNI) to "get it off their chest".

In a statement made in October 2021 following ongoing inquiries in South Armagh, a Garda spokesperson said that officers were still working with PSNI officers in a bid to solve the murder. Describing the investigation and solving the murder as "utmost priority", Gardaí made a public appeal urging those with information to come forward, "no matter how small or insignificant" it might seem.

== Reactions ==
Seán Cardinal Brady, Archbishop of Armagh, spoke out against the murder and appealed for the arrest of those involved.

In November 2007, the Ulster Unionist Party peer, Lord Laird of Artigarvan, invoked parliamentary privilege in the House of Lords to name the alleged killers, stating that the killing arose from a dispute between Quinn and the son of a man who he described as "a local IRA chief". He also raised at Westminster allegations by the Quinn family and other locals that one of the men used as "bait" in the Quinn death is under threat from the South Armagh Provisionals.

Both Gerry Adams and Martin McGuinness condemned the murder.

=== Controversial comments ===
In November 2007, Taoiseach Bertie Ahern remarked in the Dáil that, based on reports from the Gárdaí and PSNI, "this action was due to criminality". The following month Ahern said he "did not in any way intend to make an issue out of the character of Paul Quinn and I am happy to make that clear to the House". He added that the only criminals involved were those who had killed Quinn.

Shortly after Quinn's death, Conor Murphy said in an interview with Spotlight that "Paul Quinn was involved with smuggling and criminality and I think that everyone accepts that."

During the 2020 Irish general election, Conor Murphy's comments were an issue.

Mary Lou McDonald said on 3 February 2020 that she would ask Murphy to talk to Quinn's mother. She also said she did not believe that it had been said that Quinn was a criminal, but that the best thing was for Murphy to speak to Quinn's mother. Breege said that her son was definitely not involved in criminality and called on Murphy to withdraw his remarks and make a public apology to their family. On 6 February 2020, Murphy spoke to RTÉ and said that he had withdrawn the remarks he had made in 2007 and apologised to the Quinn family. Breege repeated her call for him to resign as Minister for Finance at Stormont. She said he "should finish off and get justice" for their family. She said he should "go and tell the PSNI and the Gardaí exactly who he was speaking to" in the IRA after the murder. Breege said she would not meet Murphy until he "comes out publicly saying that he is going to the PSNI to give the names of the IRA that he spoke to in Cullyhanna". McDonald said she had made an honest mistake when she said she did not believe Murphy had said that Quinn was involved in criminality. She said she only realised her mistake when she saw the BBC Spotlight programme on which the comments were made.

Breege denied that her family had suddenly started asking questions because of the election, stating she had been fighting for the past 13 years for justice.

On 17 February 2020, the Quinn family visited Stormont, accompanied by members of the SDLP.

== Discovery of body of Gerard Evans ==
The murder of Quinn led indirectly to the discovery of the body of another victim of the Provisional IRA, Gerard Evans, a 24-year-old from Crossmaglen who had gone missing after being kidnapped by the organisation in 1979. In 2009, the Sunday Tribune received information from an ex-IRA member about the location of Evans' body, who stated that he had been influenced in coming forward by the circumstances of Quinn's death. The information provided led to the location of Evans' body in 2010.

== See also ==
- List of unsolved murders (2000–present)
- Murder of Andrew Burns
- Murder of Robert McCartney
- Murder of Gareth O'Connor
- Murder of Joseph Rafferty
