= Maria Caraher =

Politician from Northern Ireland

Member of the Northern Ireland Forum for Newry and Armagh
- In office 1996–1998

Personal details
- Born: 1968 or 1969 Cullyhanna, County Armagh, Northern Ireland
- Party: Sinn Féin
- Relatives: Fergal Caraher (brother)

Maria Caraher (born 1968 or 1969) is an Irish republican activist, school principal and former politician.

== Life ==
Born in Cullyhanna, County Armagh, Northern Ireland to a republican family, she joined Sinn Féin, as did her brothers Michael and Fergal. Fergal was killed in disputed circumstances at a Royal Marines checkpoint in 1990, while Michael was convicted of involvement in the South Armagh Sniper group of the Provisional Irish Republican Army, which killed seven British soldiers and two police officers.

In 1996, Caraher was elected to the Northern Ireland Forum in Newry and Armagh, but she did not stand in the subsequent 1998 Northern Ireland Assembly election.

In 1999, Caraher went on a speaking tour of the United States as a representative of the South Armagh Farmers and Residents Committee.

Caraher was principal of Bunscoil an Iúir, an Irish language school in Newry, leaving the role in June 2018.

Northern Ireland Forum
New forum	Member for Newry and Armagh; 1996–1998	Forum dissolved
