= Murder of Andrew Kearney =

Reprisal killing in Belfast

- Part of The Troubles
- Murder of Andrew Kearney (Greater Belfast) Murder of Andrew Kearney (Northern Ireland)
- Location: Fianna Flats, New Lodge, Belfast, Northern Ireland
- Date: 19 July 1998; 28 years ago
- Attack type: Punishment shooting
- Perpetrator: Provisional IRA

Andrew Kearney (c. 1965– 19 July 1998) was a Belfast man who died as a result of a punishment shooting carried out by members of the Provisional Irish Republican Army (Provisional IRA).

== Background ==
A native of Belfast's Twinbrook Estate, Kearney was a member of an Irish republican family who supported Sinn Féin. His maternal grandfather "was in the IRA at the same time as Joe Cahill and Gerry Adams' father." A professional footballer and a father of four, with members of his family like his sister stating Kearney had no paramilitary involvement himself.

According to Lost Lives, Kearney "had a reputation for getting involved in fights". In the months leading up to his death, he had been involved in a number of non-political confrontations with local republicans and had been threatened as a result.

Two weeks before his death, Kearney allegedly beat a man unconscious in a pub brawl. The man was allegedly a north Belfast IRA commander.

== Shooting ==
On the night of 19 July 1998, at least five men broke into Kearney's eighth-floor flat in the New Lodge area of Belfast. He was up late minding his two-week-old daughter, Caitlin Rose, who was asleep on his chest. The men put Caitlin and her mother, Lisa, into a bedroom and disabled the telephone. They overpowered Kearney, allegedly with the help of chloroform, and tied his hands behind his back. He was dragged out to the lift (elevator) and shot three times: once in each knee and once in the ankle.

Lisa found him unconscious and bleeding heavily. She could not get any of the neighbours to answer their doors, and had to run to another floor to find a telephone. The lift doors had also been jammed and she had to run to the ground floor to unblock them. An ambulance rushed Kearney to the Mater Hospital, but he is believed to have died on the way.

== Aftermath ==
When his mother, Maureen, a diabetic, heard of his death, she suffered a heart attack, but survived.

It is believed that the shooting was the result of a personal grudge, and was ordered by the aforementioned IRA commander. Republicans claimed that the commander had been 'stood down' at the time, but had persuaded some associates to carry out the shooting.

The shooting came at a time when the Provisional IRA was on ceasefire and unionists were demanding that Sinn Féin be excluded from plans for a new government for Northern Ireland. The Good Friday Agreement had been signed only three months before.

Maureen Kearney said she did not want Sinn Féin punished for the attack and blamed 'gangster' elements in the Provisional IRA. She added: "Without them [Sinn Féin] what hope have we got? If they kick Sinn Féin out we'll be back to square one. I don't blame Sinn Féin for this but I do blame elements within the IRA".

Local Sinn Féin councillors attended Kearney's funeral Mass, as well as some local Provisional IRA members who had attended school with him. Gerry Kelly, a senior local Sinn Féin member, offered his condolences to the family and said the killing was "wrong and should not have happened". Gerry Adams also called to commiserate, but "disappointed her for not staying in touch".

Afterwards, she began a campaign to have her son's killers brought to justice, saying "They left him to die in a filthy, urine-soaked lift with the blood gushing out of him. Nobody treats my child like that and gets away with it. I didn't rear him for that. I was always very critical of the RUC but they would have treated Andrew far more humanely than the IRA did".

She went to Sinn Féin's head office and presented them with the funeral bill, but got no reply. She explained: "It’s not the money, I would have burnt it. I want to make them accountable for my son's death." Maureen Kearney died of diabetes less than a year after her son's death.

Despite the similarity between the death of Andrew Kearney and the murder of Robert McCartney, the death of the former had little impact. Journalist Suzanne Breen wrote:

...the Kearney killing did not gather momentum like the McCartney murder. The reason is that Andrew Kearney was shot dead three months after the signing of the Belfast Agreement. The prevailing political climate did not allow for too much pressure to be put on Sinn Féin. The dominant mood among the political and media establishment was that such incidents happen. They were IRA 'internal house-keeping' and it was best to turn a blind eye. The IRA has killed at least 20 other people when it was meant to be on ceasefire with little political fall-out. The victims were all working-class Catholics so their deaths didn't threaten or destabilise the peace process as the murder of a security force member or loyalist would have done. Those killed were generally dissidents, drug dealers or alleged drug dealers, or those who had crossed senior IRA figures in some way. The Provos interpreted the official indifference as effectively giving them the green light to continue to 'police' nationalist areas.

== See also ==
- Murder of Robert McCartney
- Murder of Paul Quinn
