= Bernard Fox (Irish republican) =

IRA member

Bernard Fox (born c. 1951) is a former member of the Army Council of the Provisional Irish Republican Army (IRA) who took part in the 1981 Irish hunger strike.

Fox, an apprentice coach builder from the Falls Road in Belfast, Northern Ireland, joined the IRA in 1969 aged eighteen. He explained his motivation for joining the IRA in a 1998 interview with the Irish News, stating: "I was almost shot in a gun attack at Norfolk Street. I came away wanting a gun. It was survival. You wanted to protect your own people ... my family and myself. When the barricades went up I wanted a gun so I approached this fella who was in the IRA and asked for gun and he said: could I shoot a British soldier? At that time I hadn't the idea that it was the British government's fault." In 1981, Fox, serving a twelve-year sentence in the Maze Prison for possession of explosives and bombing a hotel, joined the hunger strike on 24 August, replacing Paddy Quinn who was taken off the strike by his family. Fox ended his strike after 32 days without food on 24 September after doctors warned him he would be dead within days due to an obstructed kidney.

As a result of his IRA activities, Fox was imprisoned on four occasions and spent over twenty years in prison, before being released in 1998 under the terms of the Good Friday Agreement resulting from the Northern Ireland peace process. At Easter 2001, Fox was a speaker at the commemoration to mark the 85th anniversary of the Easter Rising in Dublin, saying "after spending nearly 22 years in jail, one of the questions I'm most frequently asked is 'was it worth it'? I can't answer that question. History will answer that. The question is phrased in the past tense. It's not over. The struggle continues and will continue until the British are out of Ireland". In 2005 Fox joined the IRA's Army Council replacing Brian Keenan who resigned due to ill-health. Fox resigned in September 2006 after accusing Gerry Adams and Martin McGuinness of "undemocratically" controlling the organisation, and later became involved with Éirígí.

In January 2007, Fox was returning from a family holiday when he was detained for questioning at Belfast International Airport by two men who identified themselves as members of the British security agency MI5, according to Fox's solicitors. Fox made a formal complaint regarding his treatment to the Investigatory Powers Tribunal, a body set up under the Regulation of Investigatory Powers Act 2000 to investigate complaints against MI5 and other law enforcement agencies.
