= Cullyhanna =

Village in County Armagh, Northern Ireland

Coordinates: 54°08′N 6°35′W

Cullyhanna (from Irish Coilleach Eanach, meaning 'wood of the marshes') is a small village and townland close to Keady in County Armagh, Northern Ireland. The village extends further over the townlands of Tullynavall and Freeduff. It had a population of 306 in the 2001 Census. It is within the Newry and Mourne District Council area.

== Location ==
Cullyhanna lies on the main road between Newtownhamilton (4.9 mi (8 km)) and Crossmaglen (4.8 mi (8 km)).

It's 13.3 mi (21 km) west of Newry, 49.1 mi (79 km) south west of Belfast, 13.3 mi (21 km) north west of Dundalk, and 64.7 mi (104 km) north of Dublin.

== History ==
In June 1920, during the Irish War of Independence, the Irish Republican Army ambushed Royal Irish Constabulary officers in Cullyhanna. Three officers were wounded, one fatally. The RIC returned fire, killing a civilian.

Cullyhanna, along with the rest of South Armagh, would have been transferred to the Irish Free State had the recommendations of the Irish Boundary Commission been enacted in 1925.

=== The Troubles ===
Cullyhanna is in South Armagh, a region that has been a stronghold of support for the Provisional Irish Republican Army, earning it the nickname "Bandit Country". The British Army nicknamed the local IRA unit the "Cullyhanna Gun Club". The village and the surrounding area were among the most dangerous areas in Northern Ireland for the British security forces.

For more information see The Troubles in Cullyhanna, which includes a list of incidents in Cullyhanna during the Troubles resulting in two or more fatalities.

== People ==
- Fergal Caraher, a Provisional IRA volunteer and Sinn Féin member.
- Maria Caraher, Irish republican activist, school principal and former politician.
- Paul Quinn, a native of the area, who was murdered in 2007.
- Tomás Cardinal Ó Fiaich, Primate of All Ireland and Archbishop of Armagh, who, until his death, was head of the Catholic Church in Ireland, was born near Cullyhanna. When a new school, St Patrick's Primary, was built in the village, the old school was renovated to provide a heritage centre known as the Ó Fiaich Heritage Centre.

== Sport ==
Cullyhanna is home to St Patrick's Gaelic Football Club (Cumann Naomh Pádraig). It consists of men and women's football teams and also has camogie teams. The recently built club house facilities are a focus for community activity. They beat Crossmaglen Rangers on 2 October 2016 to reach the Armagh Senior Championship final for the first time in their history.

Ashfield Golf Course is an 18-hole course at Cullyhanna.

== Politics ==
Cullyhanna forms the Newry & Armagh constituency for elections to the Westminster Parliament. The Member of Parliament is Dáire Hughes of Sinn Féin. He won the seat in the 2024 United Kingdom general election.

== Education ==
- St. Patrick's Primary School

== See also ==
- List of villages in Northern Ireland
- List of towns in Northern Ireland
