= Murder of Robert McCartney =

2005 killing in Northern Ireland

The murder of Robert McCartney occurred in Belfast, Northern Ireland, on the night of 30 January 2005 and was carried out by members of the Provisional Irish Republican Army. McCartney, born in 1971, was a Roman Catholic and lived in the predominantly nationalist Short Strand area of east Belfast, and was said by his family to have been a supporter of Sinn Féin. He was the father of two children and was engaged to be married in June 2005 to his longtime girlfriend, Bridgeen Hagans.

== Fight ==
Robert McCartney was involved in an altercation in "Magennis' Bar" on May Street in Belfast's city centre on the night of 30 January 2005. He was found unconscious with stab wounds on Cromac Street by a police patrol car and died at the hospital the following morning. McCartney was 33 years old.

The fight arose when McCartney was accused of making an insulting gesture or comment to the wife of an IRA member in the Co social club. When McCartney's friend, Brendan Devine refused to accept this accusation or apologise, a brawl began. McCartney, who was attempting to defend Devine, was attacked with a broken bottle and then dragged into Verner Street, beaten with metal bars and stabbed. Devine also suffered a knife attack, but survived. The throats of both men had been cut and McCartney's wounds included the loss of an eye and a large blade wound running from his chest to his stomach. Devine was hospitalised under armed protection.

On 27 June 2008, Terence Davison was found not guilty of committing the murder; two other men who had been charged with affray were also cleared.

== Forensic cover-up and investigation ==
When Police Service of Northern Ireland (PSNI) officers arrived at the scene, their efforts to investigate the pub and surrounding area were met with an impromptu riot. Rioting by youths, specifically attacking the police, forced them to pull back from the area, which delayed initial investigation. Police with riot gear arrived later in the evening, and were also attacked. Alex Maskey of Sinn Féin claimed, "It appears the PSNI is using last night's tragic stabbing incident as an excuse to disrupt life within this community, and the scale and approach of their operation is completely unacceptable and unjustifiable." There have been suggestions that the rioting was organised by those involved in the murder, so that a cleanup operation could take place in and around where the murder took place. Clothes worn by McCartney's attackers were burned, CCTV tapes were removed from the bar and destroyed and bar staff were threatened. No ambulance was called. McCartney and Devine were noticed by a police car on routine patrol, who called an ambulance to the scene.

When the police launched the murder investigation they were met with a "wall of silence"; none of the estimated seventy or so witnesses to the altercation came forward with information. In conversations with family members, seventy-one potential witnesses claimed to have been in the pub's toilets at the time of the attacks. As the toilet measures just four feet by three feet, this led to the toilets being dubbed the TARDIS, after the time machine in the television series Doctor Who, which is much bigger on the inside than on the outside.

Sinn Féin suspended twelve members of the party and the IRA expelled three members some weeks later.

== Political consequences ==
Gerry Adams, then president of Sinn Féin, urged witnesses to come forward to "the family, a solicitor, or any other authoritative or reputable person or body". Adams continued, "I want to make it absolutely clear that no one involved acted as a republican or on behalf of republicans". He suspended twelve members of Sinn Féin. Adams stopped short of asking witnesses to contact the police directly. The usefulness of making witness statements to the victim's family or to a solicitor was derided by the McCartneys and by a prominent lawyer and Social Democratic and Labour Party politician, Alban Maginness, soon afterwards.

On 16 February 2005, the IRA issued a statement denying involvement in the murder and calling on the perpetrators to "take responsibility".

On 8 March 2005, the IRA issued an unprecedented statement saying that four people were directly involved in the murder, that the IRA knew their identity, that two were IRA volunteers, and that the IRA had made an offer to McCartney's family to shoot the people directly involved in the murder.

In May 2005, Sinn Féin lost its council seat in the Pottinger area, which covers the Short Strand, with the McCartney family attributing the loss to events surrounding the murder.

Since this time, the sisters of Robert McCartney have maintained an increasingly public campaign for justice, which saw Sinn Féin chief negotiator Martin McGuinness make a public statement that the sisters should be careful that they were not being manipulated for political ends.

The McCartney family travelled to the United States during the 2005 St Patrick's Day celebrations where they were met by US Senators (including Hillary Clinton and John McCain) and U.S. President George W. Bush who expressed support in their campaign for justice.

Support for Sinn Féin by some American politicians was diminished. Adams was not invited to the White House in 2005 and Senator Ted Kennedy backed out of a meeting that had been previously scheduled. The McCartney family, previously Sinn Féin supporters, pledged to never support the party again, and a cousin of the sisters who raised funds for Sinn Féin in the United States insisted that she would not be doing so in the future.

In December, the McCartney sisters met with UK Prime Minister Tony Blair, and told him they believed the murder had been ordered by a senior IRA member, and that Sinn Féin was still not doing all it could to help them.

In November 2005, the McCartney sisters and Bridgeen Hagans, the former partner of Robert McCartney, refused to accept the Outstanding Achievement award at The Women of the Year Awards, because it would have meant their sharing a platform with Margaret Thatcher, whom they disliked.

On 31 January 2007, two years after the murder, and in line with the party's new policy of supporting civil policing, Sinn Féin president Gerry Adams said that anyone with information about the murder should go to the police.

On 5 May 2015, an IRA man believed to have been involved in the death of McCartney, Gerard 'Jock' Davison, was shot dead. Early in the investigation the police ruled out either a sectarian attack or the involvement of dissident republicans.

== Criminal charges ==
On 5 May 2005, Terence Davison and James McCormick were remanded in custody, charged with murdering McCartney and attempting to murder Devine respectively. McCormick is originally from England. They were held in the Republican wing of Maghaberry prison.

Roughly four months later the accused were released on bail, and in June 2006, the attempted murder charge against McCormick was dropped, leaving a charge of causing an affray.

The trial of Terrence Davison started on 22 May in Belfast Crown Court. Davison was charged with murder, and with affray along with James McCormick and Joseph Gerard Emmanuel Fitzpatrick. Davison was found not guilty by Mr Justice Gillen on 27 June 2008.

== Intimidation ==
The McCartney family had lived in the Short Strand area of Belfast for five generations. However some local people in the Short Strand area, which is a largely Nationalist area, did not welcome their dispute with the IRA. A campaign of intimidation by Republicans drove members of the family and McCartney's former fiancée, to relocate and has also caused one member to close her business in the city centre. Intimidation was continuing as of 2008. The last McCartney sister to leave the area (Paula) departed Short Strand on 26 October 2005.

As of 2007, the family were in contact with the family of Joseph Rafferty of Dublin, who died in similar circumstances.

== See also ==
- Internal Security Unit
- List of unsolved murders in the United Kingdom
- Murder of Thomas Oliver
- Murder of Andrew Kearney
- Murder of Paul Quinn
- Murder of Joseph Rafferty
