= Silke (given name) =

Silke is a Germanic female given name originally derived from Latin. There are two separate meanings:

- Silke is a Frisian diminutive form of Cecilia, from the Roman family name Caecilius
- Silke is also a German diminutive form of Celia, meaning "heavenly", from the Latin "caelum" meaning "heaven".

Those bearing it include:

- Silke Ackermann, German historian of science and museum curator
- Silke Aichhorn, German harpist
- Silke Bull, an East German sprint canoer who competed in the early 1990s. She won a gold medal in the K-4 500 m event at the 1990 ICF
- Silke Gebel (born 1983), German politician
- Silke Hörmann, German sprint canoer who has competed since the mid-2000s. She won a silver medal in the K-4 1000 m event in 2006
- Silke Kraushaar-Pielach (born 1970), German luge racer.
- Silke Meier (born 1968), German tennis player
- Silke Möller (born 1964), German track and field athlete
- Silke Rottenberg (born 1972), German football goalkeeper
- Silke Schwarz, German wheelchair fencer
- Silke Weinfurtner, British physicist
- Silke Vanwynsberghe (born 1997), Belgian footballer
