= Charles Bennett (cricketer) =

English cricketer (1872–1921)

Personal information
- Full name: Charles Oatley Bennett
- Born: 15 August 1872; Ticehurst, Sussex, England
- Died: 23 May 1921 (aged 48); Walcot, Bath, Somerset, England
- Batting: Right-handed
- Bowling: Leg-break

Domestic team information
- Years: Team
- 1902: Somerset

Career statistics
Competition	FC
Matches	2
Runs scored	10
Batting average	5.00
100s/50s	0/0
Top score	6
Catches/stumpings	1/–
- Source: CricketArchive, 22 December 2015

Charles Oatley Bennett (15 August 1872 – 23 May 1921) played first-class cricket for Somerset in 1902. He was born at Ticehurst, East Sussex and died at Bath, Somerset.

Educated at Haileybury College, Bennett was a right-handed lower-order batsman and a leg-break bowler, though he did not bowl in first-class cricket. He appeared in two matches for Somerset in June 1902, but was not successful, with a highest score of only 6.
