= Fergal Caraher =

Provisional IRA member

- Born: 12 April 1970; Cullyhanna, County Armagh, Northern Ireland
- Died: 30 December 1990 (aged 20); Cullyhanna, County Armagh, Northern Ireland
- Cause of death: Killed by Royal Marines at a checkpoint
- Political party: Sinn Féin
- Relatives: Maria Caraher (sister)
- Military career
- Paramilitary: Provisional IRA
- Unit: South Armagh Brigade
- Conflict: The Troubles

Fergal Caraher (12 April 1970 – 30 December 1990) was a Provisional IRA volunteer and Sinn Féin member who was killed by a group of Royal Marines at a checkpoint in Cullyhanna, County Armagh, Northern Ireland.

== Background ==
Fergal Caraher was born in Cullyhanna, County Armagh, Northern Ireland to a republican family. He was a member of both the Provisional IRA and Sinn Féin.

On 30 December 1990, he was killed by Royal Marines near a checkpoint in Cullyhanna. His brother, Michael Caraher, who was severely wounded in the shooting, later became the shooter of one of the South Armagh sniper squads, which killed seven British soldiers and two Royal Ulster Constabulary (RUC) members. Michael Caraher was imprisoned in 1997, but released in 2000 under the prisoner release terms of the Good Friday Agreement.

In 1996, Fergal Caraher's sister, Maria, was elected to the Northern Ireland Forum in Newry and Armagh, but she did not stand in the subsequent 1998 Northern Ireland Assembly election. She is currently the principal of Bunscoil an Iúir, an Irish language school in Newry.

== Murder trial ==
In 1993, two Royal Marines were charged with Caraher's murder. Both men, Lance Corporal Richard Elkington, 23, and Private Andrew Callaghan, 21, from 45 Commando RM, denied the charges and were acquitted.

Crown prosecutors stated that Elkington smashed the driver's window with his rifle and opened fire on the car, ordering Callaghan to do likewise as the brothers attempted to drive from a pub car park. They also stated that the investigation into the shooting had been hampered as other soldiers on scene had collected spent bullet cases instead of preserving the scene for RUC police officers and claimed that there was no lawful justification for firing on the car.

Elkington told police he had fired nine aimed shots at the driver, believing that a third Marine was being carried away by the brothers on the bonnet of their car. Callaghan stated that he fired 12 shots at the car because he feared for the life of the third Marine, whom he could not see.

Fergal Caraher is one of 24 Provisional IRA volunteers remembered at the South Armagh Memorial Garden in Mullaghbawn, near Slieve Gullion mountain.

== See also ==
- South Armagh Sniper (1990–1997)
- Provisional IRA South Armagh Brigade

== Bibliography ==
- Geraghty, Tony: The Irish War. Johns Hopkins University Press, 2000. ISBN 0-00-255617-0.
- Harnden, Toby: Bandit Country:The IRA and South Armagh. Coronet Books, 2000. ISBN 0-340-71737-8.
