= Andrew Silke =

Academic researching terrorism

Andrew Silke holds a chair in Terrorism, Risk and Resilience at Cranfield University's Forensic Institute. Previously, he was the Head of Criminology and the Programme Director for Terrorism Studies at the University of East London.

== Works ==
- Silke, Andrew, ed. (2003). Terrorists, victims, and society: psychological perspectives on terrorism and its consequences. Wiley. ISBN 978-0-471-49461-4.
- Silke, Andrew, ed. (2014). Prisons, Terrorism and Extremism: Critical Issues in Management, Radicalisation and Reform. Routledge. ISBN 978-1-136-65782-5.
- Silke, Andrew (2014). Terrorism: All That Matters. John Murray Press. ISBN 978-1-4441-6333-9.
- Silke, Andrew, ed. (2018). Routledge Handbook of Terrorism and Counterterrorism. Routledge. ISBN 978-1-317-59270-9.
