= Marentius Thams =

Norwegian merchant and industrialist

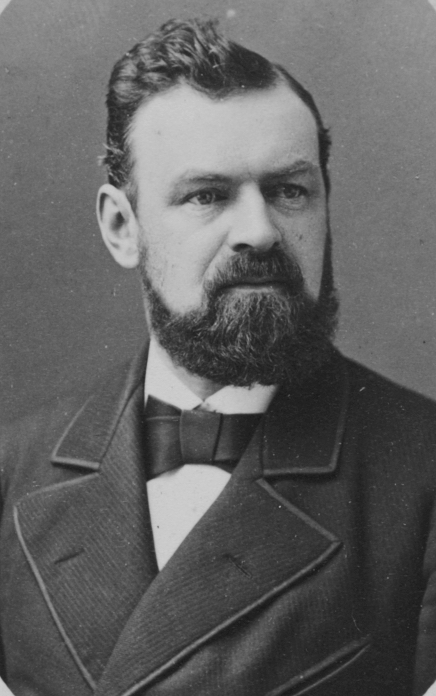
- Born: 27 February 1836; Fredrikstad, Norway
- Died: 26 July 1907 (aged 71); Meldal Municipality, Norway
- Occupations: Merchant, industrialist

Ole Christian Marentius Thullin Thams (27 February 1836 – 26 July 1907) was a Norwegian merchant and industrialist.

== Biography ==
Marentius Thams was born at Fredrikstad in Østfold, Norway. He was the son of timber trader Wilhelm August Thams (1812–1884) and Ida Olava Mandskow (1812–1889). Thams grew up in Fredrikstad and gained a commercial education, partly abroad.

He first was associated with his father's lumber business in Fredrikstad. In 1859, his father's business interests were relocated to the Orkdalen region of Sør-Trøndelag. In 1867, his father founded Strandheim Brug, a sawmill and timber trade company. The primary of facilities were destroyed by fire in 1872 after which Marentius Thams took over management of the re-built operation.

In time, Marentius further developed his father's businesses to become the country's largest of its kind. He made his firm, M. Thams & Co., known around the world through participation in world exhibitions. He also established the first company for export of fresh, iced salmon from Norway during the salmon season, May–July.

== Personal life ==
He was married to Emilie Christine Ullitz (1838–1916) and was the father of Christian Thams (1867–1948).
