= Direct Action Against Drugs =

Northern Ireland vigilante group

Direct Action Against Drugs was a vigilante group in Northern Ireland that claimed responsibility for the killing of a number of alleged drug dealers. The vigilante group was allegedly a front name used by the Provisional IRA in claiming responsibility for the killings. It was made up of IRA active members exclusively.

== List of suspected DAAD attacks 1995–2001 ==
- December 1995
  - Martin McCrory, a small-time drug dealer killed at his home in Turf Lodge, west Belfast.
  - Chris Johnston (aged 38) was killed at his home off Ormeau Road, south Belfast.
  - Francis Collins, a former member of the IRA, was killed at his chip shop in New Lodge, Belfast.
- January 1996
  - Ian Lyons died 2 January 1996, one day after being shot while sitting in a parked car outside a friend's home, Conor Park, Lurgan, County Armagh.
- September 1996
  - Séan (John) Devlin, killed in Friendly Street, Markets, south Belfast.
- February 1998
  - Brendan Campbell (aged 30), a convicted drug dealer, was shot dead outside a restaurant in south Belfast.
- May 1999
  - Brendan Joseph Fegan (aged 24), who had been described as one of Northern Ireland's main drug dealers, was shot 16 times by two gunmen in the Hermitage Bar, Newry.
- June 1999
  - Paul Downey (aged 37), a suspected drug dealer from Newry, was shot dead, allegedly by DAAD.
- April 2001
  - Christopher O'Kane, who had a reputation as a drug dealer, was gunned down as he returned to his 'Security Heavy' home in the Currynieran estate, Derry, on 21 April 2001 which was believed to be the 1st killing by D.A.A.D in Derry City but was also the very last killing by the vigilante group in Ireland. O'Kane was out celebrating his birthday whilst the group lay in wait for him for a few hours before executing him with a shotgun and AR-15 assault rifle when he returned home and struggled to get into his security heavy home so tried escaping down an alley where he was shot multiple times.

== See also ==
- Republican Action Against Drugs (RAAD)
