= Independent Monitoring Commission =

Joint British/Irish government organisation (2004–2011)

The Independent Monitoring Commission (IMC) was an organisation founded on 7 January 2004, by an agreement between the British and Irish governments, signed in Dublin on 25 November 2003. The IMC concluded its operations on 31 March 2011.

== Remit ==
The IMC's remit included:

- monitoring any continuing activity by paramilitary groups.
- monitoring the commitment by the British Government to a package of security normalisation measures.
- handling claims by parties in the Northern Ireland Assembly that a Minister, or another party in the Northern Ireland Assembly, is not committed to non-violence and exclusively peaceful and democratic means, or that a Minister has failed to observe any other terms of the pledge of office, or that a party is not committed to such of its members as are or might become Ministers observing the other terms of the pledge of office.

The IMC submitted formal reports to both the British Government and Irish Government.

The body faced criticism from Sinn Féin due to the manner in which it was set up as an apparent sop to Unionists. In a debate in Dáil Éireann Aengus Ó Snodaigh referred to it as "three spooks and a lord". Sinn Féin issued legal proceedings against the IMC, through their solicitors in London, Howe & Co, alleging that the IMC Commissioners are "apparently biased" and challenging the IMC's application (or non-application) of a standard of proof in its assessments and reports presented to the two Governments.

The IMC issued 22 reports, including 3 ad hoc reports. Two ad hoc reports were issued on the initiative of the IMC, while one (the 19th) was requested by both state governments.

== Commissioners ==
Four commissioners were involved:

- Lord Alderdice, former Alliance Party leader; former Speaker of the Northern Ireland Assembly, and peer in the British House of Lords.
- Joe Brosnan, former Secretary General of the Department of Justice, Republic of Ireland.
- John Grieve, former Deputy Assistant Commissioner of the Metropolitan Police and former head of the Metropolitan Police Anti-Terror Branch.
- Dick Kerr, former deputy director, Central Intelligence Agency.

== Chronology and list of reports ==
- 7 January 2004: Inauguration of the IMC
- 15 January 2004: Joint Declaration by the British and Irish governments
- 4 February 2004: Agreement between the British and Irish governments establishing the IMC.
- 9 March 2004: Statement by the IMC to clarify its role.
- 20 April 2004: First Report: reported 3 months early, at the request of the British and Irish governments
- 20 July 2004: Second Report
- 4 November 2004: Third Report
- 22 November 2004: First report by the Secretary of State under Section 11(1) of the Northern Ireland (Monitoring Commission etc.) Act 2003
- 10 February 2005: Fourth Report: a special report on the robbery at the headquarters of the Northern Bank, Belfast, on 20 December 2004
- 24 May 2005: Fifth Report
- 22 September 2005: Sixth Report: a special report on the "violent feud between the Ulster Volunteer Force and the Loyalist Volunteer Force"
- 19 October 2005: Seventh Report
- 1 February 2006: Eighth Report: a special report made at the request of the British and Irish governments
- 8 March 2006: Ninth Report: the first report under Article 5(1) obliging the IMC to "monitor whether, in the light of its own assessment of the paramilitary threat and of the British Government's obligation to ensure community safety and security, the commitments the British Government made in the programme are being fulfilled to the agreed timescale"
- 26 April 2006: Tenth Report
- 6 September 2006: Eleventh Report: the second report under Article 5(1), covering the period from 1 February to 31 July 2006
- 4 October 2006: Twelfth Report
- 7 December 2006: Second report by the Secretary of State under Section 11(1) of the Northern Ireland (Monitoring Commission etc.) Act 2003
- 30 January 2007: Thirteenth Report: an additional report made at the request of the British and Irish governments following the St Andrews Agreement
- 12 March 2007: Fourteenth Report: the third report under Article 5(1), covering the period from 1 August 2006 to 31 January 2007
- 25 April 2007: Fifteenth Report
- 17 September 2007: Sixteenth Report: the fourth and final report under Article 5(1), covering the period from 1 February to 31 July 2007
- 7 November 2007: Seventeenth Report
- 5 March 2008: Third report by the Secretary of State under Section 11(1) of the Northern Ireland (Monitoring Commission etc.) Act 2003
- 1 May 2008: Eighteenth Report
- 3 September 2008: Nineteenth Report: an ad hoc report giving a further assessment of the PIRA leadership structure
- 7 October 2008: Fourth report by the Secretary of State under Section 11(1) of the Northern Ireland (Monitoring Commission etc.) Act 2003
- 10 November 2008: Twentieth Report
- 7 May 2009: Twenty-first Report
- 4 November 2009: Twenty-second Report
- 26 May 2010: Twenty-third Report
- 15 September 2010: Twenty-fourth Report: a special report regarding the murder of Bobby Moffett
- 5 November 2010: Fifth report by the Secretary of State under Section 11(1) of the Northern Ireland (Monitoring Commission etc.) Act 2003
- 2 March 2011: Twenty-fifth Report: the IMC's final report
- 16 March 2011: Sixth report by the Secretary of State under Section 11(1) of the Northern Ireland (Monitoring Commission etc.) Act 2003

== 2015 ==
In 2015 the UK and Irish governments gave consideration to reviving the commission after alleged breaches of ceasefires. Since the IMC finished its work, some weapons recovered by the police had been linked to paramilitaries.

== See also ==
- Independent International Commission on Decommissioning
