= Timeline of British undercover forces in Operation Banner =

The following is a timeline of notable British Army and Royal Ulster Constabulary (RUC) undercover operations during the course of Operation Banner.

== 1970s ==
=== 1972 ===
- 15 April – Brothers Gerry and John Conway—both Catholic civilians—were walking along Whiterock Road to catch a bus. As they passed St Thomas's School, a car stopped, and three men leapt out and began shooting at them with pistols. The brothers ran, but both were shot and wounded. Witnesses said one of the gunmen returned to the car and spoke into a handset radio. Shortly afterward two armoured personnel carriers arrived, and there was a conversation between the uniformed and the plainclothes soldiers. The three vehicles then left, and the brothers were taken by ambulance to the Royal Victoria Hospital. The British Army told journalists that a patrol had encountered two wanted men, that one had fired at the patrol, and that the patrol returned fire. In a 1978 interview, a former MRF member claimed he had been one of the gunmen. On 1 December 2015 the PSNI listed this shooting as one of nine incidents it was investigating in relation to the activities of the British Army's Military Reaction Force (MRF). In 2020, the High Court ordered the MoD to pay compensation to the widow of John Conway. It also established that the Conway brothers were actually shot by a special unit from the King's Own Scottish Borderers (KOSB) led by Lieutenaunt Julian Ball.
- 6 May – An 18-year-old male was shot and injured at the Glen Road area of west Belfast, by the MRF.
- 7 May – A 15-year-old boy was shot and injured outside a disco in the Glen Road area of west Belfast by the MRF.
- 9 May – The MRF fired shots at a vehicle in the Kashmir Road area of west Belfast. Nobody was injured
- 12 May – Patrick McVeigh a 44 year old Catholic civilian was shot dead by the British Army's undercover MRF unit, at Riverdale Park South, Andersonstown, Belfast. Four other people were injured in the attack.
- 12 May – Later the same night Patrick McVeigh was shot and killed, the MRF shot and injured an 18-year-old man in the Slievegallion area of west Belfast.
- 26 May – The MRF shot and injured a 34-year-old man, in the Silvio Street area of north Belfast.
- 22 June – In the afternoon the MRF shot and injured four civilians in the Glen Road area of west Belfast.
- 26 June – 19 year old Catholic civilian Daniel Rooney was shot dead by the MRF, at St James Crescent, Falls Road, Belfast. Another 18-year-old man was also shot and injured in this shooting attack.
- In total at least two people were killed by the MRF between April – June 1972 with another 13 people being injured.
- 2 October – Attack on MRF – After extracting confessions from IRA Volunteers who were working for the MRF, the Provisional IRA Belfast Brigade attacked the Military Reaction Force. From the confessions of one of the IRA Volunteers, they found out the MRF had a number of front companies including the Four Square Laundry and the Gemini massage parlour on the Antrim Road. The Belfast Brigades 2nd Battalion led by Brendan Hughes first attacked the Four Square Laundry van in the Twinbrook, Belfast area. Four Volunteers attacked the van and killed the driver who was an undercover soldier in the Royal Engineers, a MRF woman posing as Nationalist under attack from Loyalists escaped. The IRA claimed they machine-gunned and killed undercover operatives in the hidden roof part of the van, the 3rd Battalion of the brigade shot up the Massage Parlour. The IRA claimed they had killed five undercover soldiers, the British only admitted to one killing, the driver shot dead at Twinbrook.

=== 1973 ===
- 4 February – IRA member Tony Campbell (19), and civilians Ambrose Hardy (26), Brendan Maguire (33) and John Loughran (35) were shot dead by British undercover snipers in the New Lodge area of Belfast. Further detail: New Lodge Six shooting.

=== 1974 ===
- 26 January – The Special Air Service (SAS) intercepted a team of loyalist paramilitaries returning weapons to a derelict farmhouse on the outskirts of Saintfield, County Down that was being used as an arms cache. One of the loyalists was shot and wounded in the chest as he ascended the staircase. Three comrades waiting for him in front of the building were captured by soldiers emerging from a hidden observation post.
- 24 February – IRA Belfast Brigade commander Ivor Bell was arrested in Belfast after being spotted entering a known safehouse by an SAS unit carrying out covert surveillance.
- 14 April – Captain Anthony Pollen (27) was shot dead in Meenan Square, Derry while conducting undercover surveillance with 14 Intelligence Company. Pollen was part of a group of four operators, divided into two-man observation teams, that were posing as journalists covering a parade held to commemorate the upcoming anniversary of the Easter Rising. As the other team kept their distance, Pollen and his teammate mingled with the crowd, but soon drew suspicion from IRA 'marshals' monitoring the event. Failing to answer when challenged, Pollen was killed by armed IRA members originally assembled to fire a tribute volley. Despite being armed, he hesitated and failed to draw his personal protective weapon. The other operators escaped the scene without injury.
- 12 June – The Belfast detachment of 14 Intelligence Company tracked weaponry being moved by loyalists to an Orange Hall on Shankhill Road, Belfast. The building was subsequently raided by regular British Army soldiers, who retrieved an arsenal of weapons likely stored for an intended 'major military offensive' in North Belfast.

=== 1975 ===
- 20 January – IRA member Kevin Coen (28) was killed in an exchange of gunfire with two operators from 14 Intelligence Company as he attempted to hijack a bus at an IRA roadblock at Cassidy's Cross, near Kinawley, County Fermanagh.

=== 1976 ===
- 12 March – The SAS abducted IRA member Sean McKenna (23), who was wanted for attempted murder and a string of other offences. McKenna was abducted at 2:30 am while sleeping at home in Edentubber, County Louth in a cross-border raid. Once across the border, he was officially arrested by another detachment of the British Army.
- 16 April – IRA member Peter Cleary (26) was captured and shot dead by the SAS near Forkhill, County Armagh. Suspected of involvement in the Kingsmill massacre, Cleary was snatched when he returned to the home of his girlfriend a few hundred yards inside the border. He was killed when he allegedly attacked his guard while the SAS unit were waiting for a helicopter from Bessbrook. IRA sources claimed Cleary had been 'assassinated'.
- 5 May – The Irish Army and the Garda Síochána arrested an 8-man strong SAS unit that unwittingly strayed across the border into County Louth. The SAS team were stopped at a Gardaí checkpoint, and initially resisted arrest until more Irish Army soldiers showed up, at which point they laid down their weapons and were taken into custody. The fiasco was blamed on outdated maps.

=== 1977 ===
- 16 January – IRA member Seamus Harvey (20) was shot dead by four SAS soldiers as he examined an abandoned car three miles outside of Crossmaglen in the Coolderry area. The SAS unit, concealed in nearby brackles and nettles, was observing Harvey as well as IRA comrades watching events from further away.
- 15 May – Captain Robert Nairac (29) was kidnapped on an 'undercover mission' at the Three Step Inn near Forkhill. He was driven across the border, beaten and shot, then buried in an unmarked grave. Nairac was a Military Liaison Officer (MLO) attached to 14 Intelligence Company – his sole mandate was to brief soldiers on information received and collated from MI5 and RUC Special Branch, so his unsanctioned presence at the Three Step Inn may have been a sign he was attempting to develop his own sources of intelligence. His remains have never been found.
- 12 December – Irish National Liberation Army (INLA) member Colm “Rooster” McNutt (18) was shot dead by an operator from 14 Intelligence Company at the corner of Rossville Street and William Street in Derry. McNutt and fellow INLA member Patrick Phelan attempted to hijack a car, unaware the occupant was an undercover soldier. The soldier played along and exited the vehicle, then double tapped McNutt with a Browning pistol as he moved to the passenger side. Phelan fled but was later arrested by the RUC and prosecuted for the attempted hijacking.
- 14 December – Corporal Paul Harman (27) of 14 Intelligence Company was shot dead by the IRA in West Belfast. Harman was undercover when he stopped his red Morris Marina on Monagh Avenue. When an IRA group approached and attempted to hijack the vehicle, Harman exited and tried to engage them but was killed by a concealed sniper there to cover the other IRA members – this extra precaution may have been influenced by the way Colm McNutt was killed two days earlier.

=== 1978 ===
- 26 February – IRA member Paul Duffy (23) was shot dead by SAS soldiers in the yard of an unoccupied farmhouse at Washing Bay, near Coagh, County Tyrone – the building was being used to store explosives and Duffy made a 'spur of the moment decision' to move them elsewhere. Another IRA member, who had driven Duffy to the site, was shot and wounded while escaping. (Note: Duffy was the nephew of prominent SDLP politician Paddy Duffy.)
- 17 March – Lance Corporal David Jones (23) of 14 Intelligence Company was killed during a firefight near Maghera, County Londonderry. Multiple IRA members were unknowingly approaching a covert observation post on the Glenshane Pass manned by Jones and fellow operator Lance Corporal Kevin Smyth. Jones, worried the men could be allies from the Ulster Defence Regiment (UDR), shouted a challenge – IRA commander Francis Hughes immediately sprayed fire from the hip, which struck Jones and Smyth, mortally wounding the former. Hughes was injured by a shot through the femur likely fired by Smyth, who then radioed for backup. The other IRA members fled unharmed. Hughes was discovered the next morning hiding in gorse bushes and arrested. Jones' decision to break cover was criticised in the aftermath, as he had been told the area around Glenshane Pass was off-limits to regular soldiers.
- 10 June – IRA member Denis Heaney (21) was shot dead while attempting to hijack a car in Harvey Street, Derry, at 2:30pm; he was unaware it was occupied by an operator from 14 Intelligence Company. As Heaney approached the driver's side, another undercover soldier in a second car exited and opened fire from a distance of ten to twelve feet. Heaney was struck by five bullets, 'killing him instantly'. An IRA comrade of Heaney was also shot and wounded as he stood at the passenger's side of the first vehicle. Heaney's death would alert the local IRA to the presence of plain-clothes soldiers in Derry.
- 21 June – IRA members Denis 'Dinny' Brown (28), William 'Jackie' Mailey (30) and John Mulvenna (28), were killed by an SAS team as they unloaded explosives from a van at Ballysillan post office. The SAS were acting on a tip-off from an informant that an active service unit was planning to destroy the post office. A fourth IRA member escaped the scene. During the pursuit, the SAS unit confused him with a civilian passer-by, William Hanna (28), who was consequently shot dead. Due to the controversy caused by Hanna's death, the SAS was temporarily removed from Belfast. Senior RUC officers felt the death of Hanna 'could not be balanced out' by the destruction of an IRA unit. (Note: In 1972, Brown had 'miraculously survived' being shot thirteen times by the British Army.)
- 11 July – John Boyle (16) was shot dead by two SAS soldiers from a four-man covert observation post in a graveyard in Dunloy, County Antrim. Boyle was returning to inspect an IRA arms cache he had recently discovered, which his father had reported to police. Corporal Alan Bohan and Trooper Ron Temperly were charged with murder after pressure by the RUC, but acquitted in a case presided over by Lord Chief Justice Robert Lowry, who reasoned the possibility that Boyle had raised an armalite rifle in the direction of the SAS unit could not be discounted, which would have made the shooting legal.
- 11 August – Lance Corporal Alan Swift (25) of 14 Intelligence Company was killed by the IRA during routine surveillance work on Letterkenny Road, Derry. As Swift sat in his stationary car, at least two IRA members pulled up in a hijacked Toyota van and shot him multiple times with automatic weapons. Although members of 14 Intelligence Company had been killed previously on duty, this was the first time the IRA had carried out a targeted assassination against an operator.
- 30 September – James Taylor (23), a civilian, was killed by an operator from 14 Intelligence Company at Lough Neagh near Coagh, County Tyrone. Taylor and three companions had returned to their Land Rover at the end of a shooting exhibition to find the tires deflated. Believing a nearby pair of men in an unmarked car to be the vandals responsible, Taylor approached the vehicle after a chase and was shot dead by one of the undercover soldiers inside. The soldiers claimed Taylor had been carrying a shotgun as he moved towards them, which caused them to identify him as an IRA gunman. Friends of Taylor disputed this version of events.
- 24 November – IRA quartermaster Patrick 'Patsy' Duffy (50) was shot dead by two SAS soldiers at approximately 21:20 in a house on Maureen Avenue in Derry. As Duffy examined weapons upstairs, the SAS pair emerged from a nearby bedroom and challenged him. Duffy instinctively turned round while holding a gun and was immediately killed. Bomb-making equipment was subsequently uncovered. The ruthlessness of the soldiers in this situation may have been influenced by the circumstances of the death earlier that year of Lance Corporal Jones.

=== 1979 ===
- 6 May 1979 – British Army soldier Sergeant Robert Maughan (30) and RUC officer Norman Prue (29), were both shot dead by the IRA while they conducted routine surveillance work outside of Holy Cross Church in Lisnaskea. Prue was killed as he left the unmarked stationary car to buy a copy of Republican News on sale close to the church gates (IRA surveillance had noticed police buying a copy every Sunday morning). Maughan was killed around the same time as he sat in the car.

== 1980s ==
=== 1980 ===
- 2 May – SAS Captain Herbert Westmacott (28) was killed during a shoot-out in Belfast with an IRA unit nicknamed the 'M60 Gang'. 14 Intelligence Company operators located the M60 Gang in a house on Antrim Road and an SAS squad was sent to engage. Westmacott ordered a three-man team to the rear of the building to cut off any escape (they caught one IRA member trying to enter a transit van). He led a five-man assault group, but was fatally wounded by machine-gun fire from inside. Pinned down, Westmacott's soldiers made a 'fighting withdrawal', dragging his body with them. As they prepared for a second assault, regular security forces converged on the scene; three remaining IRA members pushed the M60 to the ground and 'ran up a white flag' – they were taken into custody unharmed. Westmacott was the most senior SAS man to be killed in action during Operation Banner.

=== 1981 ===
- 14 March – IRA commander Séamus McElwaine and three IRA comrades were observed entering a farmhouse on the outskirts of Rosslea, County Fermanagh. An SAS troop arrived and surrounded the farmhouse, the leader of whom 'walked out into the open in full view' of the IRA team and challenged them to surrender or face being blasted out with grenades. After briefly debating the situation, the four IRA members left the farmhouse with their hands up and were taken into custody. McElwaine would later escape from Maze Prizon.
- 28 May – IRA members George McBrearty (24) and Charles 'Pop' Maguire (20) were killed, and comrade Eamon 'Peggy' McCourt seriously wounded, during a firefight with Sergeant Paul Oram of 14 Intelligence Company in Derry. An entire detachment of 14 Intelligence Company 'scrambled' to locate an IRA unit on their way to kill a security forces target. Oram left in a brown Opel Ascona despite it being 'blown' the day before, and was forced over at the junction of Lone Moor Road and Southways. As Maguire approached, he was shot twice in the head through the open car window. In front, McCourt opened fire with a rifle, but missed – the bullets exited the rear window and killed McBrearty instantly. McCourt was then shot five times through the shattered glass as he struggled with his gun. The IRA driver escaped the scene unhurt. Due to the seriousness of his wounds, McCourt was dumped by IRA comrades at Altnagelvin Hospital rather than being spirited across the border. He was arrested and later sentenced to five years in prison. Oram received the Military Medal, but was also 'severely reprimanded' for driving a compromised vehicle

=== 1982 ===
- 11 November – IRA members Sean Burns (21), Gervaise McKerr (31) and Eugene Toman (21) were controversially shot dead by officers from the RUC Special Support Unit (SSU) (later rebranded Headquarters Mobile Support Unit) at a vehicle checkpoint on Tullygalley East Road, Craigavon, County Armagh. All of the dead men were unarmed. An RUC press statement claimed they had failed to stop and tried to run down the police. The officers involved were acquitted of murder in June 1984 in a trial presided over by Lord Justice Maurice Gibson.
- 24 November – Michael Tighe (17) was killed and IRA member Martin McCauley (19) was seriously wounded by SSU officers at an arms cache on a farm near Derrymacash, County Armagh. The weapons were stored in a hayshed, which had been bugged with electronic sensors by police; the SSU intervened when movement was detected from the hayshed. McCauley was arrested and charged with weapons offences, later receiving a two year suspended sentence. At his trial he denied the officers had given any warning before opening fire. (Note: The status of Michael Tighe is disputed. He is listed as a civilian by CAIN and the IRA itself did not confirm he belonged to their organization. However, RUC Special Branch suspected he was a member of the North Armagh IRA alongside McCauley.)
- 12 December – INLA members Seamus Grew (30) and Roddy Carroll (21) were shot dead by SSU officers at a vehicle checkpoint near Mullacreevie Park, Armagh, County Armagh. Constable John Robinson was charged with murder, but acquitted – the judge accepting his claim that he acted in the belief that Grew and Carroll represented a threat to life. It emerged at trial that the officers were expecting INLA leader Dominic McGlinchey to be in the car.

=== 1983 ===
- 2 February – INLA member Eugene McMonagle (24) was shot dead, and his comrade Liam Duffy seriously wounded, by Sergeant Paul Oram of 14 Intelligence Company at the Shantallow estate in Derry. Oram was trying to identify the exact location of a weapons cache from a small group of 'suspect houses' in Leafair Park when a suspicious Duffy drew a pistol and grabbed him. Resisting, Oram bundled Duffy to the ground, fired at and struck McMonagle, who was advancing towards the scene with an M1 Garand, then twice shot Duffy before he could recover. McMonagle was killed, while Duffy survived when he was treated by Army medics from the 'reactive force' that arrived in the aftermath. (Note: Duffy was later convicted of firearms offences.)
- 4 December – IRA members Colm McGirr (23) and Brian Campbell (19) were shot dead, and a third comrade wounded, by soldiers from 14 Intelligence Company in a field at Cloghog Road near Clonoe, County Tyrone. McGirr was kneeling down and handing weapons from a hidden cache to Campbell, who then headed back towards the brown Talbot car that drove them to the site. An operator broke cover and challenged McGirr, still kneeling, who looked round while holding a shotgun and was immediately killed by bursts of fire from a HK53 rifle. Campbell started running and was dropped by two bullets. The 'cut-off' team opened fire on a third IRA member at the wheel of the car, who escaped despite being shot and wounded. (Note: A medic attempted an emergency tracheotomy on Campbell and successfully inserted a plastic tube into his throat, but Campbell died minutes later.)

=== 1984 ===
- 21 February – Sergeant Paul Oram (26) of 14 Intelligence Company and IRA members Henry Hogan (21) and Declan Martin (18) were killed in a shoot-out in Dunloy, County Antrim. Oram and a partner were conducting surveillance on Hogan's house at Carness Drive when they were given away by light emanating from a nearby street lamp. Hogan, Martin, and an unnamed third IRA member tried to capture them. In the resulting exchange, Oram was killed, while his partner, Hogan, and Martin were all wounded (the third IRA man lost his nerve and fled without shooting). Trying to escape through a field, Hogan and Martin were mortally wounded by another operator responding to the initial gunfire.
- 13 July – IRA member William Price (28) was shot dead by an SAS unit during an attempted incendiary bomb attack against Forbes kitchen factory in Ardboe, County Tyrone at 1 am. Two other IRA members, Raymond Francis O'Neill and Thomas Quillan, were captured by soldiers from the 'cut-off group' as they fled onto Mullanahoe Road opposite the factory. They were later sentenced to nine years in prison. A fourth IRA member escaped. (Note: The failed attack was timed to coincide with the hunger strike death of Martin Hurson three years previously.)
- 2 December – Sergeant Alistair Slater (28) and IRA member Antoine Mac Giolla Bhrighde (27) were killed during a thwarted ambush in Kesh, County Fermanagh, while IRA member Ciaran Fleming (26) died escaping the scene. An SAS troop, among them Andy McNab, arrived in Kesh at 1 am to intercept an attack at short notice. Confused by heavy fog, the soldiers stationed themselves just yards away from an IRA team waiting behind a hedge – with each faction unaware of the others presence. Mac Giolla Bhrighde was spotted holding a command wire nearby and fled. Slater had stayed behind to guard the car; to help his colleagues find Mac Giolla Bhrighde, he lit up the area using a parachute flare. This gave away his position and he was mortally wounded by IRA gunmen, who then withdrew. Mac Giolla Bhrighde was captured, but reached for the rifle of his SAS guard and was shot dead. IRA members Patrick Bramley and James Clarke successfully crossed the River Bannagh during their escape, but Fleming was swept away and drowned during his attempt. Bramley and Clarke were later arrested by Gardai after they hijacked a car once over the border at Pettigo. Further detail: Kesh ambush.
- 6 December – IRA members William Fleming (19) and Danny Doherty (23) were shot dead by 14 Intelligence Company operators in the grounds of Gransha Hospital, Derry. Fleming and Doherty were intending to assassinate an off-duty UDR soldier who worked there. An operator shadowing the pair rammed their motorcycle as they arrived, which knocked Fleming off. The same operator exited the vehicle and shot Fleming three times. Doherty attempted an escape but was cut-off by two more operators; they fired at Doherty repeatedly, causing him to crash. He was then shot a further six times.

=== 1985 ===
- 23 February – IRA members Charles Breslin (20), David Devine (17), and Michael Devine (22), were shot dead by operators from 14 Intelligence Company as they returned weapons to an arms cache in a field off Plumbridge Road, Strabane, County Tyrone. The undercover soldiers fired 117 rounds at their targets as they closed in using a 'classic fire-and-manoeuvre contact drill'. Further detail: Strabane ambush

=== 1986 ===
- 18 February – IRA member Francis Bradley (20) was shot dead by two SAS soldiers while retrieving weapons from a cache hidden behind a farmhouse at 60 Hillhead Road, Castledawson, County Londonderry. Bernard 'Barney' McLarnon (53), who had driven Bradley to the site, was later arrested. He was eventually released because he could not be 'conclusively linked to any terrorist organisation'. (Note: Although listed as a civilian by CAIN, Bradley was identified by an RUC source as belonging to the IRA active service unit based in Toomebridge. An inquest into the circumstances of his death published on 24 October 2024 found that he was 'engaged in activities on behalf of the IRA' and that his name was entered into the IRA roll of honour, which described him as a 'volunteer, County Derry'.)
- 26 April – IRA commander Séamus McElwaine (25) was shot dead by the SAS near Rosslea, County Fermanagh at 4:30am. An army foot patrol had spotted and reported a poorly concealed command wire two days previously, which led to the insertion of a four-man SAS patrol to monitor the location. McElwaine, carrying an FNC rifle, was cut down by bursts of fire while emerging from a ditch. Another IRA member, Sean Lynch, was seriously wounded during the same encounter. He was captured while hiding in a hedgerow during a same day follow-up operation. (Note: Claims made by Lynch that McElwaine was interrogated before being 'executed' were 'comprehensively denied' by the soldiers involved.)

=== 1987 ===
- 8 May – IRA members Declan Arthurs (21), Seamus Donnelly (19), Tony Gormley (25), Eugene Kelly (25), Patrick Kelly (30), Jim Lynagh (31), Pádraig McKearney (32) and Gerard O'Callaghan (29) were killed by an SAS reaction team as they attempted to destroy the RUC station at Loughgall, County Armagh using a hijacked digger carrying a 200 lb bomb. A civilian, Anthony Hughes, was also killed and his brother badly wounded when they unwittingly drove into the ambush in progress. Further detail: Loughgall ambush
- 26 August – RUC Special Branch officers Ernest Carson (50) and Michael Malone (35) were shot dead by IRA gunmen at the Liverpool Bar, opposite the ferry terminal at Donegall Quay, Central Belfast. Both men were plain-clothes detectives whose role was to check passengers and seamen moving through the port. Seán Savage and Daniel McCann are believed to have been the gunmen responsible for this attack.

=== 1988 ===
- 6 March – IRA members Seán Savage (24), Daniel McCann (30), and Mairéad Farrell (31) were killed by the SAS in Gibraltar. The trio had been intent on detonating a car bomb in a spot where the band of the Royal Anglian Regiment would be assembling for a changing of the guard ceremony two days later. Further detail: Operation Flavius
- 4 July – Kenneth Stronge (46) was critically wounded by a combined SAS/RUC team as it responded to IRA gunmen firing at North Queen Street RUC station from a stolen car. Stronge, a taxi driver, was shot three times when he drove his taxi into the crossfire and died of a heart attack a few days later in hospital. No passengers were hurt. An IRA member was shot and wounded during the engagement, but escaped on foot.
- 30 August – IRA members Gerard Harte (29), Martin Harte (23), and Brian Mullin (26) were intercepted and killed by the SAS near Carrickmore while they attempted to assassinate what they believed to be an off-duty UDR soldier. Known as 'Fred the coalman', he drove an easily recognized lorry that called at coal depots and visited the UDR base in Omagh. He was replaced by an SAS decoy, who pulled the lorry over at a prearranged spot and pretended to fix a wheel, which lured the IRA members into a trap. Further detail: Drumnakilly ambush

=== 1989 ===
- 2 September – Ulster Volunteer Force (UVF) member Brian Robinson was shot dead by two soldiers from 14 Intelligence Company after he killed Catholic civilian Paddy McKenna on the Crumlin Road. Robinson's act was observed by two nearby operators in an unmarked Vauxhall Astra, who gave chase as Robinson sped away on the back of a motorcycle driven by fellow UVF member Davy McCullough. Robinson was shot repeatedly after being rammed off the road. McCullough, badly injured after the collision with the Astra, was arrested at the scene and then taken to hospital. He later received a life sentence.

== 1990s ==
=== 1990 ===
- 13 January – Edward Paul Hale (25), John Joseph McNeill (42), and Peter Thompson (21), were shot dead by two SAS soldiers on secondment to 14 Intelligence Company outside Sean Graham's Bookmakers on the Falls Road. The dead men had carried out a robbery of the location using replica weapons. None had links to any loyalist or republican terrorist organisation. In the aftermath, the soldiers claimed they had intervened in the belief that Hale, McNeill, and Thompson were members of a loyalist group attacking Catholic civilians.
- 24 March – An operator from 14 Intelligence Company escaped from an IRA ambush in Cappagh, County Tyrone. The operator, 'John', was performing a drive-through to locate a suspect vehicle when IRA member Martin McCaughey, emerging from the sunroof of a nearby Ford Escort, fired two shots from an AK-47 rifle that passed through the rear window of his car. Protected by his armoured seat, 'John' returned fire and wounded McCaughey in the shoulder, ear, stomach and leg before evacuating the area – comrades later moved McCaughey across the Irish border for medical treatment. The IRA driver at the wheel of the Ford Escort, John Quinn, was also wounded, though less seriously. An Phoblacht later published false claims that two SAS soldiers had been killed in this incident. (Note: Quinn was killed by the UVF in the Cappagh killings the following year.)
- 18 April – Irish People's Liberation Organisation (IPLO) member Martin Corrigan (25) was killed by the SAS outside the home of an intended target on the Lislasley Road, near Loughgall, County Armagh. Corrigan, brandishing an M1 Carbine, was shot repeatedly after firing at least one round from his gun when a soldier broke cover to challenge him. A second IPLO member armed with a sawn-off shotgun dropped his weapon and surrendered. He was later convicted of terrorist offences.
- 9 October – IRA members Dessie Grew (37) and Martin McCaughey (23) were shot dead by an SAS team as they collected weapons from the shed of a derelict farmhouse on the Lislasley Road, near Loughgall, County Armagh. Grew and McCaughey emerged from the shed guns in hand – the SAS soldiers then 'blanketed their targets' with heavy fire. The SAS had been staking out the location for seven nights before the shooting, acting on intelligence that Grew was preparing to kill a local member of the RUC Reserve.
- 22 November – INLA member Alexander Patterson (31) was killed by the SAS during an 'attack' on the home of an off-duty UDR soldier at Victoria Bridge, County Tyrone. Patterson acted as getaway driver – when a comrade in the rear seat fired six bullets at the empty house of the off-duty soldier, a waiting SAS unit shot Patterson dead at the wheel of the car as he tried to pull away. Two other INLA members fled on foot but were captured soon afterwards. Ironically, Patterson, an RUC informant, was the source of intelligence that caused his death. Based on his tip of an imminent assassination attempt, the UDR soldier and his family were relocated – he had hoped the SAS would miss him and only strike his erstwhile INLA comrades.

=== 1991 ===
- 10 April – IRA member Colm Marks (29) was shot by RUC HMSU officers while preparing a mortar bomb at St Patrick's Avenue, Downpatrick, County Down. Marks, reportedly the 'commanding officer' of the IRA in Downpatrick, died in hospital. An accomplice escaped unharmed.
- 3 June – IRA members Tony Doris (21), Michael 'Pete' Ryan (37) and Lawrence McNally (39) were killed by the SAS in an ambush in Coagh, County Tyrone. Arriving in a red Vauxhall Cavalier that had been hijacked in nearby Moneymore, they were intending to kill a former UDR soldier who had been replaced by an SAS decoy. When Ryan and McNally wound down the windows of the car and lifted their weapons, SAS soldiers concealed in a lorry just metres away opened fire at the IRA trio, whose car was struck by around 200 bullets and burst into flames. Further detail: Coagh ambush

=== 1992 ===
- 16 February – IRA members Kevin O'Donnell (21), Sean O'Farrell (23), Peter Clancy (19), and Patrick Vincent (20) were killed by an SAS team following an attack on the RUC station located in Coalisland, County Tyrone. As they arrived at the car park in Clonoe where they intended to burn their vehicle and switch to pre-positioned cars, the waiting SAS team lit up flares and opened fire. Vincent, the driver, was killed before he could leave his seat, while O'Donnell and Clancy were gunned down as they tried to dismount their DShK machine gun. Meanwhile, O'Farrell was shot dead by a cut-off unit as he attempted to escape on foot. Two other IRA members, acting as support drivers, were also shot and wounded. Further detail: Clonoe ambush
- 25 November – IRA member Pearse Jordan (21) was controversially shot dead on the Falls Road, Belfast, by an undercover RUC mobile patrol unit as he ran away from a stolen car he had been driving. Police later claimed forensic traces from Jordan's clothing linked him to explosives. Jordan was the last person to be killed in a covert operation during the Northern Ireland conflict.

=== 1993 ===
- 12 December 1993 – Fivemiletown ambush - IRA volunteers from the East Tyrone Brigade ambushed and killed two RUC officers (Constables Andrew Beacom and Ernest Smith) while patrolling on a civilian-type car in Fivemiletown, County Tyrone. The men were part of the RUC Operational Support Unit, which surveilled the Irish border along with the British Army. The unmarked patrol car was on Main Street when it was hit by at least 20 shots from both sides of the road. In a follow up operation a British Army Lynx helicopter received automatic fire from an IRA unit.

=== 1997 ===
- 26 March – Shortly after 9:30 pm, SAS soldiers in civilian clothes shot and wounded IRA members Gareth Doris and Paul Campbell after they had thrown a home-made bomb containing 1 kilogram (2.2 lb) of semtex at the Army/RUC base at Coalisland, County Tyrone. The soldiers subsequently fired shots into the air to keep an angry crowd at a distance, leaving once RUC officers arrived to perform riot control. Further detail: 1997 Coalisland attack
- 10 April – a group of 16 undercover SAS members restrained four IRA volunteers, part of one of the two sniper teams which operated in South Armagh and handed them over to the RUC, after tracking the IRA men to a farm complex. The owner of the farm and two other men were also arrested, but were released on 17 April. Given the imminence of a second IRA ceasefire and the prospective of a political solution to the conflict, the SAS were under strict orders to avoid IRA casualties.
- 10 June – an active service unit from the IRA's Derry Brigade riding on a van fired upon undercover soldiers on a stationary van on the west side of the river Foyle in Derry. An intensive search recovered the attackers' van at Glendara Park but failed to round up any suspects. No injuries were reported, but 30 families were evacuated from the area as army technical experts performed forensic examinations on the abandoned vehicle.

=== 1998 ===
- 14 January – there was a friendly-fire incident between an RUC patrol and two unmarked British Army vehicles in Belfast after the two civilian-type cars were chased by the RUC. One of the cars crashed at the junction of Crumlin Road and Antrim Road. A female soldier in plain clothes shot and seriously wounded an RUC member in the chest as his patrol approached the vehicle.
