= Nish Bruce =

British soldier

Charles Bruce QGM
- Born: 8 August 1956; Chipping Norton, Oxfordshire
- Died: 8 January 2002 (aged 45); Fyfield, Oxfordshire
- Other name: Tom Read
- Military career
- Allegiance: United Kingdom
- Branch: British Army
- Service years: 1973–1988
- Rank: Sergeant
- Nickname: "Nish"
- Service number: 24329999
- Units: 2nd Battalion, Parachute Regiment (1973–78); The Red Devils (Parachute Regiment) (1978–82); 22 Special Air Service (1982–88)
- Conflicts: The Troubles; Falklands War
- Awards: Queen's Gallantry Medal

Charles Christian Cameron "Nish" Bruce, QGM (8 August 1956 – 8 January 2002) was a British Army soldier who served with the British Army's Parachute Regiment and Special Air Service.

In the early 1980s he deployed to the Falklands War as well as Northern Ireland, taking part in Operation Banner. He was awarded the Queen's Gallantry Medal. In 1998, he published a memoir of his life entitled Freefall, under the pseudonym "Tom Read". After several years of psychiatric illness, Bruce killed himself, during a flight over South-Eastern England, by leaping to his death without a parachute.

== Early life ==
Bruce was born in Chipping Norton, in Oxfordshire, England, on 8 August 1956. He came from a family with a military tradition, being the middle son of a father who had been a fighter pilot with the Royal Air Force during the Second World War, and the paternal grandson of Major Ewen Cameron Bruce.

== Military career ==
Bruce joined the British Army's Parachute Regiment as a private in 1973 at the age of 17, and served with the regiment in Northern Ireland in the mid-1970s in Operation Banner. From 1978 he spent four years with the Red Devils Display Team, participating in test-jumping, international exhibitions and competitions. At the time of his death in 2002, with nearly 30 years in military and civilian parachuting, Bruce had logged over 8,500 parachute jumps. His parachute log books show that he learnt his basic parachuting skills at Sibson Airfield, Peterborough from 1974 to 1978 prior to joining The Red Devils (Parachute Regiment) Display Team and achieved his D Rating in April 1979).

Bruce subsequently applied for transfer to the Special Air Service and, after passing its aptitude trials, was attached to 22 SAS in April 1982, shortly before the Falklands War commenced. He served in B Squadron, 7 (Air) Troop from 1982 to 1986. While with 'B' Squadron 7 Troop, he served with Alistair Slater, Frank Collins and Andy McNab. (In a November 2008 interview with The Daily Telegraph, McNab described Bruce as "one of my heroes".)

In 1982, with other members of 'B' Squadron, 22. SAS, Bruce parachuted into the South Atlantic Ocean during the Falklands War, and took part in Operation Mikado.

In late 1984 Bruce was involved with British Army counter-terrorist operations against Provisional Irish Republican Army (IRA) active service units in Kesh, County Fermanagh in Northern Ireland, for which he was later awarded the Queen's Gallantry Medal for "exemplary acts of bravery" in maintaining the pursuit of an IRA vehicle in a high speed chase while under almost continual fire. Describing Bruce's conduct, military history author Harry McCallion comments:

"One member of the pursuit team recalls the weight of fire that was poured out at them as being like 'a sheet of lead'. Despite the hail of rounds flying around him, Corporal Bruce didn't flinch or hang back for a moment. Instead, he kept his car right up on the tail of the fleeing van, remaining as close as was reasonably possible."

One of the operations led to the death in action of his Special Air Service comrade Alistair Slater in a confrontation with several IRA volunteers from the Derry Brigade, including Antoine Mac Giolla Bhrighde and Kieran Fleming (whose cousin William Fleming was killed in another SAS operation four days later), who were also killed in the incident which became known as the Kesh ambush (Slater being posthumously awarded the Military Medal).

According to The Guardian, Bruce was initially discharged from the SAS in early 1986 for "not being a team player" after a clash with his superiors. However, following his award of the Queen's Gallantry Medal in late 1986 Bruce was invited to re-join the Regiment and from 1987 to 1988 he was attached to the 22nd Special Air Service Regiment's 'G' Squadron, 24 (Air) Troop.

== Later life ==
After leaving the British Army in 1988 with the rank of sergeant, Bruce worked in a private security capacity for the comedian Jim Davidson, before taking the role of second in command of an undercover operation codenamed Project Lock, a WWF sponsored anti-poaching operation in Southern Africa (1988–1990) led by SAS founder David Stirling and SAS Lieutenant-Colonel Ian Crooke. Operation Lock's primary purpose in Southern Africa was to track down dealers in rhino horn and ivory. Linked to this was identifying their methods for illegal export, pinning corruption against those in high places who colluded with the dealers, and helping with the training and equipping of anti-poaching teams for endangered species in general and rhino in particular.

Following Operation Lock, for two years Bruce worked in Washington, D.C. as bodyguard for Lebanese billionaire and former Prime Minister of Lebanon Saad Hariri.

Bruce was an experienced pilot. He held South African, American and British pilot licences as well as a commercial pilot licence, which enabled him to fly both single-engine fixed wing aircraft and helicopters. In July 1992 he piloted his single-engine Cessna 172 Skyhawk from the US, across the Atlantic Ocean via Greenland and Iceland back to the UK.

In the early 1990s Bruce started the 'Skydive From Space' project, to skydive from the edge of space from 130,000 feet and break the highest altitude freefall record previously set by Joe Kittinger in the 1960s. He trained with Loel Guinness' High Adventure Company and Kittinger. The project was partially backed and funded by NASA. As a part of it Bruce, Harry Taylor and scientist and astronaut Karl Gordon Henize, with an ascent team, climbed the North Ridge Route of Mount Everest in late 1993 to test a NASA meter called a "tissue equivalent proportional counter" at different altitudes (17,000, 19,000 and 21,000 ft, or from 5,180 to 6,400 m), the device measuring the effects upon the human body of radiation at altitude, which would be factored in for consideration of space missions of a longer duration. The expedition was abandoned after the death of Karl Henize from high altitude pulmonary edema on 5 October 1993. Although the expedition was cut short, NASA received the information it had been sent out to acquire from the meter's readings logged during the ascent.

In February 1994 Bruce had a nervous breakdown whilst living in Chamonix, France, where he without warning attempted to murder his girlfriend with a pair of scissors, stabbing her several times before being dragged off her by another man present. He was confined shortly afterwards by the local authorities to a psychiatric hospital. The completion of the 'Skydive from Space' project was abandoned in consequence, and he began receiving psychiatric medical treatment.

Bruce came to public prominence in 1998 when his memoir entitled Freefall was published by Little, Brown Book Group, under the pseudonym 'Tom Read', ghost written by Michael Robotham. The book detailed Bruce's military career, the 'Skydive From Space' project, the ascent of Mount Everest, and his subsequent descent into mental illness and psychological recovery. Freefall was described by Andy McNab, one of his comrades in the British Army, as "This is Bravo Two Zero meets One Flew Over the Cuckoo's Nest. Read's story had me on the edge of my seat – and it also made me cry". An updated paperback and kindle edition of Freefall was published on 5 August 2021.

== Death ==
Despite periods of psychological recovery, after eight years of recurring mental illness, and being intermittently sectioned in mental hospitals, Bruce killed himself on 8 January 2002 by deliberately jumping, without a parachute, out of a private Cessna 172 light aircraft in which he was a passenger during a flight over the South-East of England, falling 5,000 feet (1,500 m) to his death. His body was subsequently found on a football pitch at the village of Fyfield in Oxfordshire. He was 45 years old. His military career and the manner of his death resulted in extensive media coverage of the incident. There has been conjecture that Bruce's psychological breakdown was attributable to post-traumatic stress disorder incurred from his military career.

A report in The Guardian in 2002 discussed "post-career anticlimax" and stated that "the problem of post-discharge mental collapse and suicide among former special soldiers is increasingly being recognised". Bruce's friend Mark Lucas was quoted as having made this comment:

"We shouldn't be surprised by what happens when men experience what these men have experienced ... They are trained to survive in a landscape in which the dividing line between life and death is extremely thin."

On 16 January 2002, Bruce was cremated at Banbury Crematorium in Oxfordshire; his ashes were subsequently scattered by his son and former colleagues during a memorial skydive in April 2002 over Northamptonshire from Hinton Skydiving Centre. In December 2021, a memorial plaque in memory of Bruce was added to the Goose Green Memorial Bench within Aldershot Military Cemetery, Surrey.

== Quotations ==
- "Nothing else comes close to those first few seconds after leaving the plane, because once you take that last step there is no going back. A racing driver or a skier or climber can pull over and stop, have a rest, but with parachuting, once you cross that threshold, you have to see it through."

== Publications ==
- Freefall (1998)
