= Strabane ambush =

1985 British victory in the Troubles

- Part of the Troubles and Operation Banner
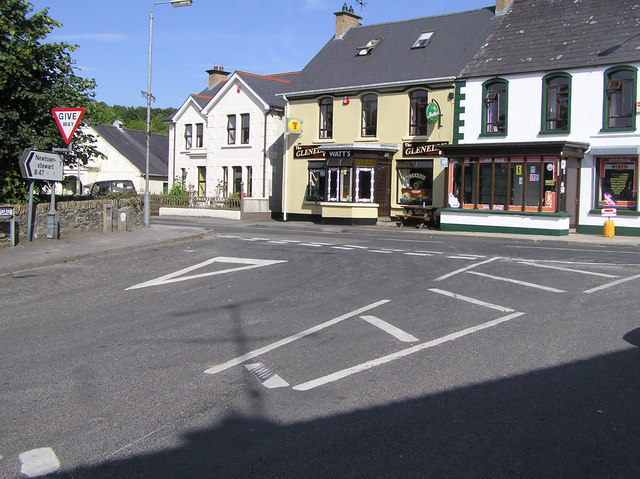
- Near the ambush site
Date	23 February 1985
Location	Strabane, County Tyrone; Northern Ireland 54°49′48″N 7°28′12″W
Result	British victory

Belligerents
Provisional IRA; IRA West Tyrone Brigade	United Kingdom: British Army (SAS)

Commanders and leaders
Charles Breslin †	Unknown

Strength
3 IRA Volunteers	8 soldiers

Casualties and losses
3 killed	None
- Ambush at Strabane

The Strabane Ambush was a British Special Air Service ambush against a three-man Provisional Irish Republican Army (IRA) unit. All three members of the IRA unit were killed in the ambush. At the time it was the most successful SAS operation against the IRA, until the Loughgall ambush two years later in 1987 in which eight IRA volunteers were killed.

== Background ==
Strabane was one of the IRA's most deadly strongholds during The Troubles. IRA and Irish National Liberation Army Volunteers in Strabane carried out attack after attack against the British security forces; between 1971 and 1991 16 attacks were launched by Irish Republicans against British troops and RUC police which resulted in the death of at least one member of the British security forces in each of those attacks, the British Army and RUC bases in Strabane were constantly attacked with sniper fire, bombings, grenades, mortar attacks and RPG attacks. Strabane was once the most bombed town in Europe in proportion to its size, and was the most bombed town in Northern Ireland.

A few weeks earlier in December 1984, the Special Air Service (SAS) carried out two ambushes against the Provisional IRA Derry Brigade which killed four IRA volunteers, in the first in the Kesh ambush Kieran Fleming and another IRA volunteer was killed, four days later Kieran's cousin William Fleming and Danny Doherty were killed in another ambush.

== Ambush ==
On the 23 February 1985, an IRA active service unit while returning weapons or bringing new weapons to an arms cache in Plumbridge Road in Strabane were suddenly ambushed by a British Army SAS unit and all three IRA volunteers were killed on the spot. Local witness said they heard that no warning to surrender was given by the SAS as the men entered a field which is when the SAS unit fired over 100 rounds at the Volunteers killing them instantly. The IRA volunteers killed at Strabane were Michael Devine (22), David Devine (16), the youngest IRA volunteer killed in the conflict, and his brother and unit Commander Charles "Charlie" Breslin (21).

Breslin was a volunteer in the West Tyrone Brigade of the Provisional Irish Republican Army from Strabane, County Tyrone in Northern Ireland. There were claims that the deaths were part of a wider British government "shoot-to-kill" policy in which republican paramilitaries were summarily executed without any attempt at arrest.

The families of the three IRA members that were killed claimed they were ambushed after a stake out by the SAS. In February 1987, a pathologist at the inquest stated two of the victims had been shot 28 times, mostly while on the ground, and that the third victim had been hit on the bridge of the nose. All three had single bullet wounds to the head.

An undisclosed amount of compensation was awarded to the families of the three IRA volunteers by the Ministry of Defence on 7 May 2002, as part of a Belfast High Court settlement brought as a result of the shootings. In February 2005, in excess of a thousand people went to the graveside of Charles Breslin and the Devine brothers to mark the 20th anniversary of the shooting and hear an oration given by Gerry Adams. Members of the Police Service of Northern Ireland were accused of desecrating the graves of the volunteers, although Superintendent Raymond Murray of the PSNI denied that they had any involvement.

== Aftermath ==
This ambush was the first in several high-profile SAS and undercover soldier ambushes and operations between 1985 – 1992 especially targeting the IRA's units around the Fermanagh, Tyrone and Armagh borders. A year later the IRA's Fermanagh commander Séamus McElwaine was killed during an ambush, and in 1987 eight volunteers from the Provisional IRA East Tyrone Brigade were killed in the Loughgall ambush; in 1988 three volunteers were killed during Operation Flavius in Gibraltar; that August three more IRA men were killed in the ambush at Drumnakilly; in 1991 three more volunteers were killed in the Coagh ambush; and finally in February 1992 in the Clonoe ambush four IRA volunteers were killed.

== See also ==
- Ambush at Drumnakilly
- Loughgall ambush
- Coagh ambush
- Clonoe ambush
- The Troubles in Strabane
