= Kesh ambush =

1984 ambush in Northern Ireland

- Part of the Troubles and Operation Banner
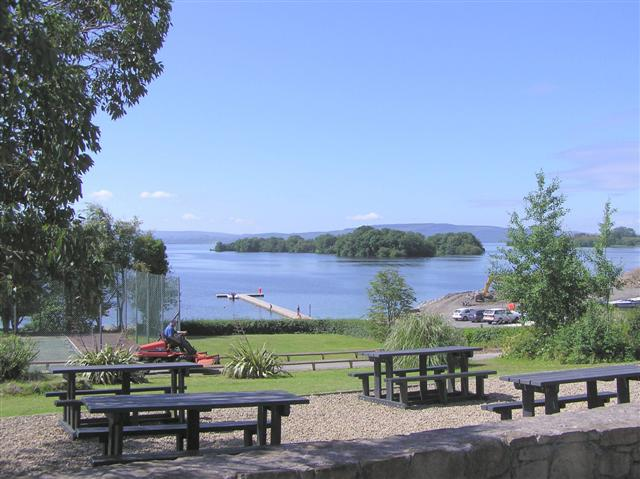
- Drumrush Lodge, close to where the ambush took place
Date	2 December 1984
Location	Kesh, County Fermanagh; Northern Ireland 54°31′19.2″N 7°43′22.8″W
Result	British victory: IRA ambush thwarted

Belligerents
Provisional IRA	UK: British Army (SAS)

Commanders and leaders
Kieran Fleming †	Alistair Slater †

Strength
4 IRA volunteers	Unknown

Casualties and losses
2 killed (1 died from drowning); 2 arrested in the Republic	1 killed
- Kesh shown inside Northern Ireland

On 2 December 1984, a four-man Provisional Irish Republican Army (IRA) active service unit was ambushed by a British Army Special Air Service team while attempting to bomb a Royal Ulster Constabulary patrol who they had lured to Drumrush Lodge Restaurant. Two IRA volunteers and one SAS soldier were killed during the action.

== Background ==
Prior to the ambush, the IRA had started to intensify their campaign against the British state. Two months earlier, in October 1984, the IRA carried out a bomb attack on the Grand Hotel in Brighton, England, which was being used as the base for the Conservative Party's annual conference. Five people were killed in the attack and several were badly injured. Prime Minister Margaret Thatcher narrowly escaped injury, and the bombing had been an attempt on her life. After the attack, the IRA released a statement saying "Today, we were unlucky, but remember, we only have to be lucky once – you will have to be lucky always."

Kieran Fleming was one of 38 IRA prisoners who escaped from the Maze Prison in September 1983.

== Ambush ==
On Sunday morning, 2 December 1984, four IRA volunteers, Kieran Fleming and Antoine Mac Giolla Bhrighde, stole a Toyota van in Pettigo, County Donegal. The van was then loaded with nine beer kegs, each containing about 100 lb of explosives. They then crossed the border and travelled to Kesh, County Fermanagh, where they met two other IRA volunteers, Patrick Bramley and James Clarke. At the Drumrush Lodge Restaurant just outside Kesh, the unit then planted a landmine in a lane leading to the restaurant and wired a device which was connected to an observation point. From there, a hoax call was made in order to lure the British Army to the restaurant on the pretense that there was a firebomb planted in the restaurant.

Mac Giolla Bhrighde observed an RUC patrol car approaching the restaurant and gave the detonation code word "one". However, the mine failed to explode. There was another car parked in the car park which Mac Giolla Bhrighde believed to contain civilians, and he got out of the van from which he was observing the scene to warn the civilian car to leave the area.

According to Republican sources, when he approached the car, two Special Air Service (SAS) soldiers got out and commanded him to halt and drop his gun. Mac Giolla Bhrighde, who was unarmed, informed the SAS of this and then one of the SAS men stepped forward and shot him on his left side. He was then handcuffed and shot dead.

However, according to Conflict Archive on the Internet (CAIN), there was a gun battle at the scene of the attempted bombing, between a number of IRA men and British troops in which Mac Giolla Bhrighde was killed. A British Army soldier, Lance Corporal Alistair Slater, from Leicestershire, was also killed in the exchange of fire, further contradicting the Republican sources. Charles "Nish" Bruce served with Slater on this operation. His autobiography, Freefall, under the pseudonym Tom Read, recounted in detail an exchange of fire and the respective deaths of both Slater and Mac Giolla Bhrighde. Andy McNab, a former SAS soldier, supported this view in his book Immediate Action.

The British Army officially listed Slater as a member of the Parachute Regiment. However, an obituary appeared in the SAS magazine Mars & Minerva, stating that Slater was a member of 7 Troop (Free Fall) 'B' Squadron of the SAS. The remainder of the IRA ASU then came under fire and became trapped between the SAS unit and the swollen River Bannagh; Fleming, unable to swim, was swept away and drowned, while Bramley and Clarke crossed into the Republic. Both of them were eventually arrested by Gardai when attempting to hijack a car near Pettigo.

== Aftermath ==
Fleming's body was not found until 21 December. There was severe rioting between the RUC and Republican mourners during his funeral at the Waterside on Christmas Eve. Dozens of people were injured.

Just four days later, on 6 December 1984, two more IRA volunteers were killed by the SAS. Kieran Fleming's cousin William Fleming and Danny Doherty were killed on the grounds of Gransha hospital while travelling on a motorcycle.

== See also ==
- Loughgall ambush
- Coagh ambush
- Clonoe ambush
- Operation Conservation
