= Maze Prison escape =

1983 prison break in Northern Ireland

Coordinates: 54°29′19″N 6°6′27″W

The Maze Prison escape (known to Irish republicans as the Great Escape) took place on 25 September 1983 in County Antrim, Northern Ireland. HM Prison Maze (also known as Long Kesh) was a maximum security prison considered to be one of the most escape-proof prisons in Europe. It held prisoners suspected of taking part in armed paramilitary campaigns during the Troubles, with separate wings for loyalists and for republicans. In the biggest prison escape in UK peacetime history, (Note: The biggest UK breakout was the 97 Italians who escaped from Camp 14 at Doonfoot, Ayr, on 15 December 1944.) 38 Provisional Irish Republican Army (IRA) prisoners escaped from H-Block 7 (H7) of the prison. One prison officer died of a heart attack during the escape and twenty others were injured, including two who were shot with guns that had been smuggled into the prison.

The escape was a propaganda coup for the IRA, and a British government minister faced calls to resign. The official inquiry into the escape placed most of the blame onto prison staff, who in turn blamed the escape on political interference in the running of the prison.

== Previous IRA escapes ==
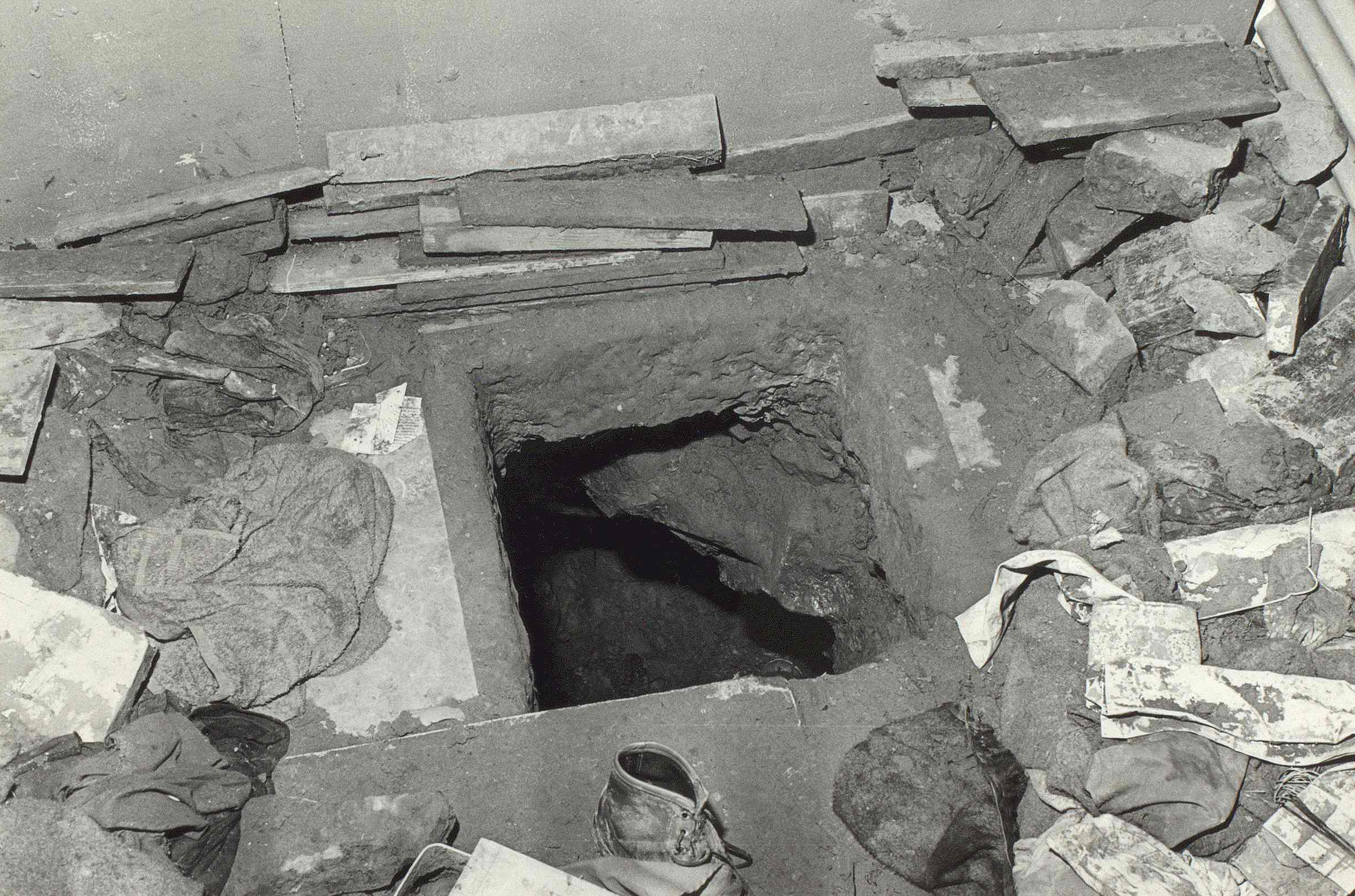
RUC archive image (via the Public Record Office of Northern Ireland) taken following the November 1974 tunnel escape attempt. In this escape, three IRA volunteers escaped but were later apprehended in the Twinbrook estate. One IRA volunteer, Hugh Coney, was shot dead just outside the perimeter wall.

IRA volunteers regarded themselves as prisoners of war with a duty to escape. During the Troubles, Irish republican prisoners had escaped from custody en masse on several occasions. On 17 November 1971, nine prisoners, dubbed the "Crumlin Kangaroos", escaped from Crumlin Road Jail when rope ladders were thrown over the wall. Two prisoners were recaptured, but the remaining seven managed to cross the border into the Republic of Ireland and appeared at a press conference in Dublin. On 17 January 1972, seven internees escaped from the prison ship HMS Maidstone by swimming to freedom, resulting in their being dubbed the "Magnificent Seven". On 31 October 1973, three leading IRA members, including former Chief of Staff Seamus Twomey, escaped from Mountjoy Prison in Dublin when a hijacked helicopter landed in the exercise yard of the prison.

Nineteen IRA members escaped from Portlaoise Jail on 18 August 1974 after overpowering guards and using gelignite to blast through gates. Thirty-three prisoners attempted to escape from Long Kesh on 6 November 1974 after digging a tunnel. IRA member Hugh Coney was shot dead by a sentry, 29 other prisoners were captured within a few yards of the prison and the remaining three were back in custody within 24 hours. In March 1975, ten prisoners escaped from the courthouse in Newry while on trial for attempting to escape from Long Kesh. The escapees included Larry Marley, who would later be one of the masterminds behind the 1983 escape. On 10 June 1981, eight IRA members on remand, including Angelo Fusco, Paul Magee and Joe Doherty, escaped from Crumlin Road Jail. The prisoners took prison officers hostage using three handguns that had been smuggled in, took their uniforms and shot their way out of the prison.

== 1983 escape ==
HM Prison Maze was considered one of the most escape-proof prisons in Europe. In addition to 15-foot (4.6 m) fences, each H-Block was encompassed by an 18-foot (5.5 m) concrete wall topped with barbed wire, and all gates on the complex were made of solid steel and electronically operated. Prisoners had been planning the escape for several months. Bobby Storey and Gerry Kelly had started working as orderlies in H7, which allowed them to identify weaknesses in the security systems, and six handguns had been smuggled into the prison. Shortly after 2:30 pm on 25 September, prisoners seized control of H7 by simultaneously taking the prison officers hostage at gunpoint to prevent them from triggering an alarm. One officer was stabbed with a craft knife, and another was knocked down by a blow to the back of the head. One officer who attempted to prevent the escape was shot in the head by Gerry Kelly, but survived. By 2:50 pm the prisoners were in control of H7 without an alarm being raised. A dozen prisoners also took uniforms from the officers, and the officers were also forced to hand over their car keys and details of where their cars were, for possible later use during the escape. A rearguard was left behind to watch over hostages and keep the alarm from being raised until they believed the escapees were clear of the prison, when they returned to their cells.

At 3:25 pm, a lorry delivering food supplies arrived at the entrance to H7, whereupon Brendan McFarlane and other prisoners took the occupants hostage at gunpoint and moved them inside H7. The lorry driver was told the lorry was being used in the escape, and he was instructed what route to take and how to react if challenged. Storey told the driver, "This man [Gerry Kelly] is doing 30 years and he will shoot you without hesitation if he has to. He has nothing to lose." At 3:50 pm the prisoners left H7, and the driver and a prison orderly were taken back to the lorry, and the driver's foot tied to the clutch. 37 prisoners climbed into the back of the lorry, while Gerry Kelly lay on the floor of the cab with a gun pointed at the driver, who was also told the cab had been booby trapped with a hand grenade.

At nearly 4:00 pm the lorry drove towards the main gate of the prison, where the prisoners intended to take over the gatehouse. Ten prisoners dressed in guards' uniforms and armed with guns and chisels dismounted from the lorry and entered the gatehouse, where they took the officers hostage. At 4:05 pm the officers began to resist, and an officer pressed an alarm button. When other staff responded via an intercom, a senior officer said, while being held at gunpoint, that the alarm had been triggered accidentally. By this time the prisoners were struggling to maintain control in the gatehouse due to the number of hostages. Officers arriving for work were entering the gatehouse from outside the prison, and each was ordered at gunpoint to join the other hostages. Officer James Ferris ran from the gatehouse towards the pedestrian gate attempting to raise the alarm, pursued by Dermot Finucane. Ferris had already been stabbed three times in the chest, and before he could raise the alarm he collapsed.

Map of HM Prison Maze showing the escape route

Finucane continued to the pedestrian gate where he stabbed the officer controlling the gate, and two officers who had just entered the prison. This incident was seen by a soldier on duty in a watch tower, who reported to the British Army operations room that he had seen prison officers fighting. The operations room telephoned the prison's Emergency Control Room (ECR), which replied that everything was all right and that an alarm had been accidentally triggered earlier. At 4:12 pm the alarm was raised when an officer in the gatehouse pushed the prisoner holding him hostage out of the room and telephoned the ECR, too late to prevent the escape. After several attempts the prisoners had opened the main gate, and were waiting for the prisoners still in the gatehouse to rejoin them in the lorry. At this time two prison officers blocked the exit with their cars, forcing the prisoners to abandon the lorry and make their way to the outer fence which was 25 yards away.

Four prisoners attacked one of the officers and hijacked his car, which they drove towards the external gate. They crashed into another car near the gate and abandoned the car. Two escaped through the gate, one was captured exiting the car, and another was captured after being chased by a soldier. At the main gate, a prison officer was shot in the leg while chasing the only two prisoners who had not yet reached the outer fence. The prisoner who fired the shot was captured after being shot and wounded by a soldier in a watch tower, and the other prisoner was captured after falling. The other prisoners escaped over the fence, and by 4:18 pm the main gate was closed and the prison secured, after 35 prisoners had breached the prison perimeter. The escape was one of the biggest in British history, and the biggest in Europe since the Second World War.

Outside the prison the IRA had planned a support operation involving 100 armed members but due to a miscalculation of five minutes, the prisoners found no transport waiting for them and were forced to flee across fields or hijack vehicles. The British Army and Royal Ulster Constabulary (RUC) immediately activated a contingency plan; by 4:25 pm a cordon of vehicle checkpoints was in place around the prison, and others were later set up in strategic positions across Northern Ireland, resulting in the recapture of one prisoner at 11:00 pm. Twenty prison officers were injured during the escape, thirteen were kicked and beaten, four stabbed, and two shot. One prison officer, James Ferris, who had been stabbed, died after suffering a heart attack during the escape.

== Reaction ==
The escape was a propaganda coup and morale boost for the IRA, with Irish republicans dubbing it the "Great Escape". Leading unionist politician Ian Paisley called on Nicholas Scott, the Parliamentary Under-Secretary of State for Northern Ireland, to resign. The British Prime Minister, Margaret Thatcher, made a statement in Ottawa during a visit to Canada, saying "It is the gravest [breakout] in our present history, and there must be a very deep inquiry". The day after the escape, Secretary of State for Northern Ireland James Prior announced an inquiry would be headed by Her Majesty's Chief Inspector of Prisons, James Hennessy.

The Hennessy Report was published on 26 January 1984 placing most of the blame for the escape on prison staff and made recommendations to improve security at the prison. The report also placed blame with the designers of the prison, the Northern Ireland Office and successive prison governors who had failed to improve security. James Prior announced that the prison's governor had resigned, and that there would be no ministerial resignations as a result of the report's findings. Four days after the Hennessy Report was published, Nicholas Scott dismissed allegations from the Prison Governors Association and the Prison Officers Association that the escape was due to political interference in the running of the prison.

On 25 October 1984, nineteen prisoners appeared in court on charges relating to the death of prison officer James Ferris, sixteen charged with his murder. A pathologist determined that the stab wounds Ferris suffered would not have killed a healthy man. The judge acquitted all sixteen as he could not correlate the stabbing to the heart attack.

== Escapees ==
Fifteen escapees were captured on the day, including four who were discovered by the RUC hiding underwater in the river Lagan using reeds to breathe. Four more escapees were captured over the next two days, including Hugh Corey and Patrick McIntyre, who were captured following a two-hour siege at an isolated farmhouse. Out of the remaining 19 escapees, 18 ended up in the republican stronghold of South Armagh, where two members of the IRA's South Armagh Brigade were in charge of transporting them to safehouses and given the option of either returning to active service in the IRA's armed campaign or a job and new identity in the United States.

Escapee Kieran Fleming drowned in the Bannagh River near Kesh in December 1984, while attempting to escape from an ambush by the Special Air Service (SAS) in which fellow IRA member Antoine Mac Giolla Bhrighde was killed. Gerard McDonnell was captured in Glasgow in June 1985 along with four other IRA members, including Brighton bomber Patrick Magee, and convicted of conspiring to cause sixteen explosions across England. Séamus McElwaine was killed by the SAS in Roslea in April 1986 and Gerry Kelly and Brendan McFarlane were returned to prison in December 1986 after being extradited from the Netherlands, where they had been arrested in January 1986, leaving twelve escapees still on the run. Pádraig McKearney was killed by the SAS along with seven other members of the IRA's East Tyrone Brigade in the Loughgall ambush in May 1987, the IRA's biggest single loss of life since the 1920s.

In November 1987 Paul Kane and one of the masterminds of the escape, Dermot Finucane—brother of assassinated solicitor Pat Finucane—were arrested in Granard, County Longford on extradition warrants issued by the British authorities. Robert Russell was extradited to Northern Ireland in August 1988 after being captured in Dublin in 1984, as was Paul Kane in April 1989. In March 1990 the Supreme Court of Ireland in Dublin blocked the extradition of James Pius Clarke and Dermot Finucane on the grounds they "would be probable targets for ill-treatment by prison staff" if they were returned to prison in Northern Ireland.

Kevin Barry Artt, Pól Brennan, James J. Smyth and Terrence Kirby, collectively known as the "H-Block 4", were arrested in the United States between 1992 and 1994 and fought lengthy legal battles against extradition. Smyth was extradited back to Northern Ireland in 1996 and returned to prison, before being released in 1998. In 2000, the British government withdrew extradition requests for Brennan, Artt and Kirby. The men officially remain fugitives but in 2003 Her Majesty's Prison Service said they were not being "actively pursued". Brennan, who had married a US citizen, was deported from the United States to the Republic of Ireland in August 2009. Tony Kelly was arrested in Letterkenny, County Donegal in October 1997 but was not extradited. Dermot McNally, who had been living in the Republic of Ireland and was tracked down in 1996 and Dermot Finucane, received an amnesty in January 2002, leaving them to return to Northern Ireland. Tony McAllister was not granted a similar amnesty.

As of 2008, Gerard Fryers and Séamus Campbell had not been traced since the escape.

== Mistreatment ==
The captured prisoners were mistreated by prison officers upon return. During the extradition hearing of fugitive and Maze Prison escapee James J. Smyth at the U.S. district court in San Francisco, Maze prison governor John Baxter admitted that guards brutalised the returning inmates following the 1983 breakout and later lied in court by denying the prisoners had suffered dog bites. He said the officers involved had never been disciplined and there were no plans to do so. U.S. district judge Barbara A. Caulfield wrote under the "Maze prison" section of her finding that:

6. The republican prisoners who escaped but were captured and returned were forced to run a gauntlet of guard dogs which were allowed to bite them. The guards ordered attack dogs upon the republican prisoners as they were moved to other cell blocks. The dogs bit several prisoners. The prisoners were denied medical care for several days. Many of the escapees were rounded up and returned to the Maze immediately after the escape. Upon their return to the Maze, prison officers kicked and punched the returned escapees and repeatedly called them "Fenian bastards". Numerous prison officers took part in the mistreatment of the returned escapees.

7. There was no evidence that prisoners in the loyalist wing were similarly treated. That is, of the loyalist and republican prisoners who did not escape, only the republicans were moved, beaten, kicked, bitten by dogs, and subjected to religious and political insults.

8. Several prisoners brought actions for damages for their treatment following the escape. The court in Northern Ireland found that there was a widespread conspiracy to conceal the fact of the assault of the prisoners.

9. No disciplinary action was ever taken against the prison officers for their abuse of the prisoners in connection with the escape or for perjuring themselves. The current prison governor testified that there are no plans to discipline the prison officers involved and the "case is closed" as far as he is concerned. None of the testifying prison officials knew whether any of the prison officers who participated in the abuse of the returned escapees or who perjured themselves are still employed at the Maze prison. The Maze Prison governor, John Baxter, acknowledged that many of the guards who are at the Maze now have been there since the 1983 escape.

...

12. Ex-prisoners from the Maze are subject to increased scrutiny by the security forces. Several witnesses on behalf of James Smyth testified that ex-prisoners are frequently subject to harassment by the security forces.

13. Sean Mackin was arrested and charged with the attempted murder of a prison officer's daughter. Mackin testified that while he was in the Crumlin Road prison before trial, he was treated differently from other prisoners in that every time an officer was killed, he would either be beaten in his cell or put in solitary confinement.

...

15. Paul Kane was a 1983 Maze escapee who was extradited from the Republic of Ireland to Northern Ireland in 1989. During the course of his extradition proceedings, he applied to the Minister of Justice in Ireland not to send him back because he feared being assaulted by the prison staff and members of the security forces. The Minister of Justice denied the application and guaranteed that Kane would not be abused upon his return. As soon as Kane was handed over to the security forces at the Northern Ireland border, verbal abuse, including anti-Catholic remarks, began. Once put in a holding cell in Belfast, handcuffs were placed very tightly on his wrists and despite numerous requests, the handcuffs were not removed or loosened. Kane also was roughed up by the security forces within hours of being returned to Northern Ireland.

== Subsequent escape attempts ==
On 10 August 1984 loyalist prisoner Benjamin Redfern, a member of the Ulster Defence Association, attempted to escape from HM Prison Maze by hiding in the back of a refuse lorry, but died after being caught in the crushing mechanism. On 7 July 1991, IRA prisoners Nessan Quinlivan and Pearse McAuley escaped from HM Prison Brixton, where they were being held on remand. They escaped using a gun that had been smuggled into the prison, wounding a motorist as they fled. On 9 September 1994 six prisoners—an armed robber, Danny McNamee and four IRA members including Paul Magee—escaped from HM Prison Whitemoor. The prisoners, in possession of two guns that had been smuggled into the prison, scaled the prison walls using knotted sheets. A guard was shot and wounded during the escape, and the prisoners were captured after being chased across fields by guards and the police.

In March 1997 a 40-foot (12 m) tunnel was discovered in H7 at the Maze Prison. The tunnel was fitted with electric lights, and was 80 feet (24 m) from the outside wall, having already breached the block's perimeter wall. On 10 December 1997 IRA prisoner Liam Averill, serving a life sentence after being convicted of the murder of two Protestants, escaped from the Maze dressed as a woman. Averill mingled with a group of prisoners' families attending a Christmas party, and escaped on the coach taking the families out of the prison. He was not apprehended and was granted an amnesty in 2001.

== Dramatisation ==
The prison break was dramatised in the 2017 film Maze, written and directed by Stephen Burke, and starring Tom Vaughan-Lawlor and Barry Ward.
