= Frank Collins (British Army soldier) =

English chaplain

The Reverend Frank Collins

Personal life
- Born: 5 November 1956 Newcastle upon Tyne, England
- Died: 16 June 1998 (aged 41) Stockbridge, Hampshire, England
- Education: Oak Hill Theological College

Religious life
- Religion: Anglicanism
- Denomination: Church of England
- Church: St Peter with St Owen and St James Church, Hereford

Frank Collins (5 November 1956 – 16 June 1998) was a Church of England clergyman and the first 22 SAS soldier to enter the building in the Iranian Embassy Siege in 1980. Whilst with 22 SAS B Squadron (Air) Troop, Collins served with both Al Slater and Charles "Nish" Bruce. He left military service in 1989 after 15 years to work in security and later pursued training for ordained ministry, and eventually returned to military service as a chaplain.

Having trained at Oak Hill College, a conservative evangelical theological college, Collins was ordained in the Church of England as a deacon in 1992 and as a priest in 1993. He served his curacy at St Peter with St Owen and St James, Hereford in the Diocese of Hereford. He was then commissioned as a chaplain in the Territorial Army, and served as padre of 23 Special Air Service Regiment (Reserve), The Parachute Regiment and the AMF(L) in Bulford, Wiltshire.

His autobiography, Baptism of Fire, was published by Doubleday in 1997. The army was unhappy with his book and forced him to resign.

Collins killed himself in 1998.
