= Proxy bomb =

Tactic used mainly by the Provisional Irish Republican Army (IRA) in Northern Ireland

The proxy bomb, also known as a human bomb, is a tactic that was used mainly by the Provisional Irish Republican Army (IRA) in Northern Ireland during the Troubles. It involved forcing people (including off-duty members of the British security forces or people working for the security forces) to drive car bombs to British military targets after placing them or their families under threat or held as hostages. The tactic has also been used by Ulster Loyalist militants and was later adopted by the FARC in Colombia and by rebels in the Syrian Civil War.

The tactic has been compared to a suicide bomb, but each bomber is coerced, rather than being a volunteer.

== Early proxy bombs ==
=== Irish Republican Army ===
The first proxy bomb attacks took place in Northern Ireland during the Troubles. By 1973, increased searches and surveillance by the British security forces were making it harder for IRA members to plant their bombs and escape. In response, the IRA introduced the proxy bomb tactic in March of that year. In the early proxy bombings, the driver and nearby civilians would usually be given enough time to flee the area before the bomb detonated. One of the proxy bomb attacks carried out by the IRA during this period took place in 1975, when an employee of Northern Ireland's Forensics Laboratory in Newtownbreda was forced to drive a car laden with explosives to the building. The explosion caused moderate damage, and operations resumed quickly. The Laboratory would be the subject of one of the largest IRA bombings in 1992, when a 1,700 kg van bomb, abandoned in the compound parking lot, demolished the facilities and caused widespread damage within a radius of 1 km.

==== Irish National Liberation Army ====
The Irish National Liberation Army used a proxy bomb on at least one occasion. On 28 August 1986 the INLA claimed responsibility for seven bomb attacks across Northern Ireland: two of the bombs were proxy bombs when they forced taxi drivers to drive bombs to RUC stations which exploded outside the RUC bases in Newry and Downpatrick; nobody was hurt in either bombing.

=== Ulster Loyalists ===
The proxy bomb was used by Ulster loyalists on a number of occasions in 1974 in the Republic of Ireland. In July, an armed group kidnapped an off-duty Garda and forced him to drive a car bomb to the village of Magheraveely, on the border between County Cavan and Fermanagh. The proxy-bombers target was a Catholic-owned pub. The Garda managed to abandon the vehicle on an open field. In another incident, a man was forced to drive a car bomb which eventually failed to explode into Clones, County Monaghan. The IRA claimed that they defused the device. On 11 September 1974, masked gunmen in British Army uniform hijacked a car in Northern Ireland, placed a time bomb inside and forced the owner to drive it into the village of Blacklion, County Cavan. They claimed to be from the Ulster Volunteer Force and threatened to attack his family if he did not comply. The village was evacuated, and the Irish Army carried out a controlled explosion on the car. It estimated that the bomb would have destroyed most of the village.

=== Hindawi affair ===
In the 1986 Hindawi affair, a Jordanian citizen romanced an Irish woman working as a chambermaid in a London hotel, getting her pregnant, asking her to marry him and persuading her to fly on an El Al airliner to be introduced to his family in Damascus, Syria. She was stopped by airport security at Heathrow, who discovered that he had planted a bomb in her suitcase before taking her to the airport to put her on the flight.

== October 1990 proxy bombings ==
October 1990 proxy bombings
- Part of the Troubles
- Location: Coshquin, Cloghoge and Omagh, Northern Ireland
- Date: 24 October 1990
- Target: British Army bases and checkpoints
- Attack type: vehicle bombs
- Deaths: 7 (6 soldiers, 1 civilian)
- Injuries: 14
- Perpetrator: Provisional IRA

On 24 October 1990, the Provisional Irish Republican Army (IRA) carried out a series of proxy-bomb attacks. In these particular cases, three men deemed by the IRA to be "collaborators" were strapped into three vehicles and forced to drive to three British military targets. However, unlike the earlier proxy bombings, they were not given the chance to escape. The three synchronised attacks took place at Coshquin (near Derry), Cloghoge (near Newry), and Omagh in the early morning of 24 October 1990. The Coshquin attack was the deadliest, killing the human proxy and five soldiers. One soldier was killed at Cloghoge, but the proxy survived. At Omagh, there were no fatalities because a faulty detonator meant the main explosive charge did not go off as intended.

=== Coshquin ===
The Coshquin operation involved 11 members of the IRA's Derry City Brigade. RUC Special Branch had received some intelligence about the operation, but it was said to be only a "vague outline" of an "impending assault against a base" in the area.

A Catholic, Patrick Gillespie, 42, who lived in the Shantallow area of Derry and worked as a cook at the Fort George British Army base in the city, had been warned to stop working at the base or risk reprisal. On one occasion, the IRA had forced him to drive a bomb into the base, giving him just enough time to escape. However, that bomb had failed to detonate. On 24 October 1990, members of the IRA's Derry City Brigade took over Gillespie's house. While his family was held at gunpoint, he was forced to drive his car to a rural spot on the other side of the Irish border in County Donegal. Gillespie was then put in a van loaded with 1,000 pounds (450 kg) of explosives, chained to the seat to prevent his escape and told to drive to the Coshquin permanent border checkpoint on Buncrana Road.

An armed IRA team followed him by car to ensure that he obeyed their commands. Four minutes from the checkpoint, the IRA team armed the bomb remotely. When Gillespie reached the checkpoint, at 3:55 AM, he tried to get out and warn the soldiers, but the bomb detonated when he attempted to open the door. IRA bomb makers had installed a detonation device linked to the van's courtesy light, which came on whenever the van door opened. As a safeguard, the bombers also used a timing device to ensure that the bomb detonated at the right moment. Gillespie and five soldiers were killed, including Kingsman Stephen Beacham, Vincent Scott, David Sweeney, Paul Worrall and Lance Corporal Stephen Burrows, from D (Support) Company of the 1st Battalion the King's Regiment.

Witnesses reported hearing "shouting, screaming and then shots" right before the explosion. The bomb devastated the base, destroying the operations room and a number of armoured vehicles. It was claimed that the death toll would have been much higher had the soldiers not been sleeping in a recently built mortar-proof bunker. The blast damaged 25 nearby houses.

At Gillespie's funeral, Bishop Edward Daly said the IRA and its supporters were "the complete contradiction of Christianity. They may say they are followers of Christ. Some of them may even still engage in the hypocrisy of coming to church, but their lives and their works proclaim clearly that they follow Satan".

=== Cloghoge ===
In tandem with the Coshquin operation, members of the IRA's South Down Brigade took over the house of a Catholic man, James McAvoy, 65, in Newry. He was allegedly targeted because he served RUC officers at his filling station, which was beside the house. He was driven away in a Toyota HiAce van while his family was held at gunpoint. At Flagstaff Hill, near the Irish border, members of the IRA's South Armagh Brigade loaded the van with one ton of explosives. McAvoy was strapped into the driver's seat and told to drive the van to the accommodation block at Cloghoge permanent vehicle checkpoint. Before he drove off, a senior IRA member seemed "to have a pang of conscience" and whispered in McAvoy's ear "don't open the door; go out through the window".

An IRA team followed the van in a car and turned into a side road shortly before it reached the checkpoint. When McAvoy stopped the van and climbed out of the window, a soldier came over and began shouting at him to move the vehicle. Moments later, a timer detonated the bomb. The soldier was killed outright and 13 other soldiers were injured. McAvoy survived but suffered a broken leg.

The soldier killed was Ranger Cyril J. Smith, from B Company, 2nd Battalion, Royal Irish Rangers. Smith, who was also a Northern Ireland Catholic, was posthumously awarded the Queen's Gallantry Medal, as he tried to warn his comrades about the bomb, rather than running for cover.

=== Omagh ===
At about the same time, there was a third attempted proxy bombing in County Tyrone. A man was strapped into a car and forced to drive it to Lisanelly Camp in Omagh while his family was held at gunpoint. The bomb weighed 1,500 pounds (680 kg), and only exploded partially because of a faulty detonator.

=== Effects ===
The 'proxy bombs' of October 1990 caused widespread outrage, especially among the Catholic community, the Catholic Church, and even among some IRA supporters, eventually forcing the IRA to drop the tactic. According to journalist and author Ed Moloney, "as an operation calculated to undermine the IRA's armed struggle, alienate even its most loyal supporters and damage Sinn Féin politically, it had no equal".

Moloney has suggested that the tactic may have been calculated to weaken the position of alleged "hawks" in republicanism, those who favoured armed action over electoral politics. At the same time, Moloney argues that the widespread public revulsion would have strengthened the position of those in the IRA who were considering how republicanism could abandon violence and focus on electoral politics. Peter Taylor wrote of the proxy bombs that by such actions and the revulsion they caused in the community, IRA hardliners inadvertently strengthened the hand of those within the republican movement who argued that an alternative to armed struggle had to be found.

== Later proxy bombs ==
=== The Troubles ===
Several more 'human proxy bombings' were planned, but the operations were called off, partly because of the outrage it drew from all sections of the community. Nevertheless, there were a few more 'traditional' proxy bombings in the following months.

At 9:30 am on 22 November 1990, the IRA took over a man's house in Newtownbutler, County Fermanagh. While his parents were held at gunpoint, he was forced to drive a Toyota Hilux pick-up truck to Annaghmartin military checkpoint. He was told that the truck carried a bomb on a five-minute timer. When he reached the checkpoint, he shouted a warning and a small explosion was heard, but the main bomb failed to detonate. The vehicle was found to contain 3,500 pounds (1,600 kg) of homemade explosives, the biggest IRA bomb until then. The same checkpoint was the subject of a heavy machine gun attack on 26 December.

In early February 1991, another proxy bomb wrecked an Ulster Defence Regiment base in Magherafelt, County Londonderry, but there were no fatalities. Two months later, on 8 April, near the border town of Belleek, County Fermanagh, a civilian female motorist working in the local RUC/Army barracks was taken hostage along her husband at an IRA checkpoint and forced to drive to the facilities with a bomb in her handbag. A soldier on watch in a sangar at the base main gate raised the alarm, and the area was evacuated. There were no casualties, but the observation post was heavily damaged by the blast. The final IRA use of proxy bombs came on 24 April 1993, when they forced two London taxi drivers to drive bombs towards Downing Street and New Scotland Yard. There were no casualties, however, as the drivers managed to shout warnings and to abandon their cars in time. A conventionally delivered bomb was detonated by the IRA on the same day in the financial centre of Bishopsgate, in Central London.

=== Colombia ===
In the early 2000s, FARC rebels began to use proxy car bombs in Colombia. That has been attributed to training given to FARC by members of the Provisional IRA. In the Colombian province of Arauca in January 2003, three brothers were forced to drive car bombs into military checkpoints, each told that the other brothers would be killed if they did not comply. One of the brothers died, along with six Colombian soldiers, and another survived with serious injuries in a separate incident, when only one of the three explosive charges attached to the vehicle went off, resulting only in minor damage to the target. The whereabouts of the third brother were still unknown in December 2003.

=== Republican dissidents ===
In December 2013, Óglaigh na hÉireann, a Real IRA splinter group, claimed responsibility for an attempted bomb attack on Belfast City Centre in which a car was hijacked and its driver forced to deliver the bomb to its intended target. The bomb only partially detonated, leaving no casualties.
