= Londonderry County Asylum =

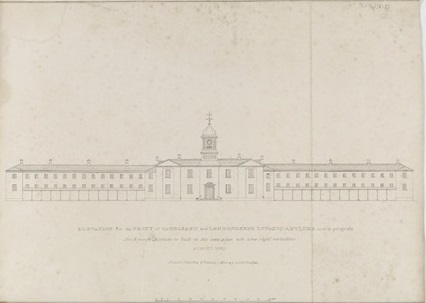
- Londonderry County Asylum

- Shown in Northern Ireland

Geography
- Location: Derry, County Londonderry,, Northern Ireland
- Coordinates: 55.0029°N 7.3240°W

Organisation
- Type: Specialist

Services
- Speciality: Psychiatric hospital

History
- Founded: 1829
- Closed: 1905

The Londonderry County Asylum was a psychiatric hospital at Strand Road in Derry, County Londonderry, Northern Ireland.

== History ==
The hospital, which was designed by Francis Johnston and William Murphy, opened as the Londonderry Asylum in 1829. It had been built at a cost of £25,678 and was intended to cater for the City of Derry and the counties of Londonderry, Donegal and Tyrone. The asylum initially provided accommodation for 104 patients but had to be extended the following year so it could accommodate 150 patients. After the patients were transferred to the new Gransha Hospital, the asylum closed in 1905.

By the mid-1960s the site had become overgrown and the remaining buildings were demolished soon after. There are local stories of tunnels running from the old infirmary (where Clarendon Manor is now located at the top of Clarendon Street/Asylum Road) that ran into the asylum. Another tunnel running from the asylum Superintendent's residence on the Northland Road to the asylum was reported to have been bricked up in the 1960s. The North West Regional College Strand Road Campus is now located on the site of the asylum.
