= William Fleming (Irish republican) =

Irish republican (1965-1984)

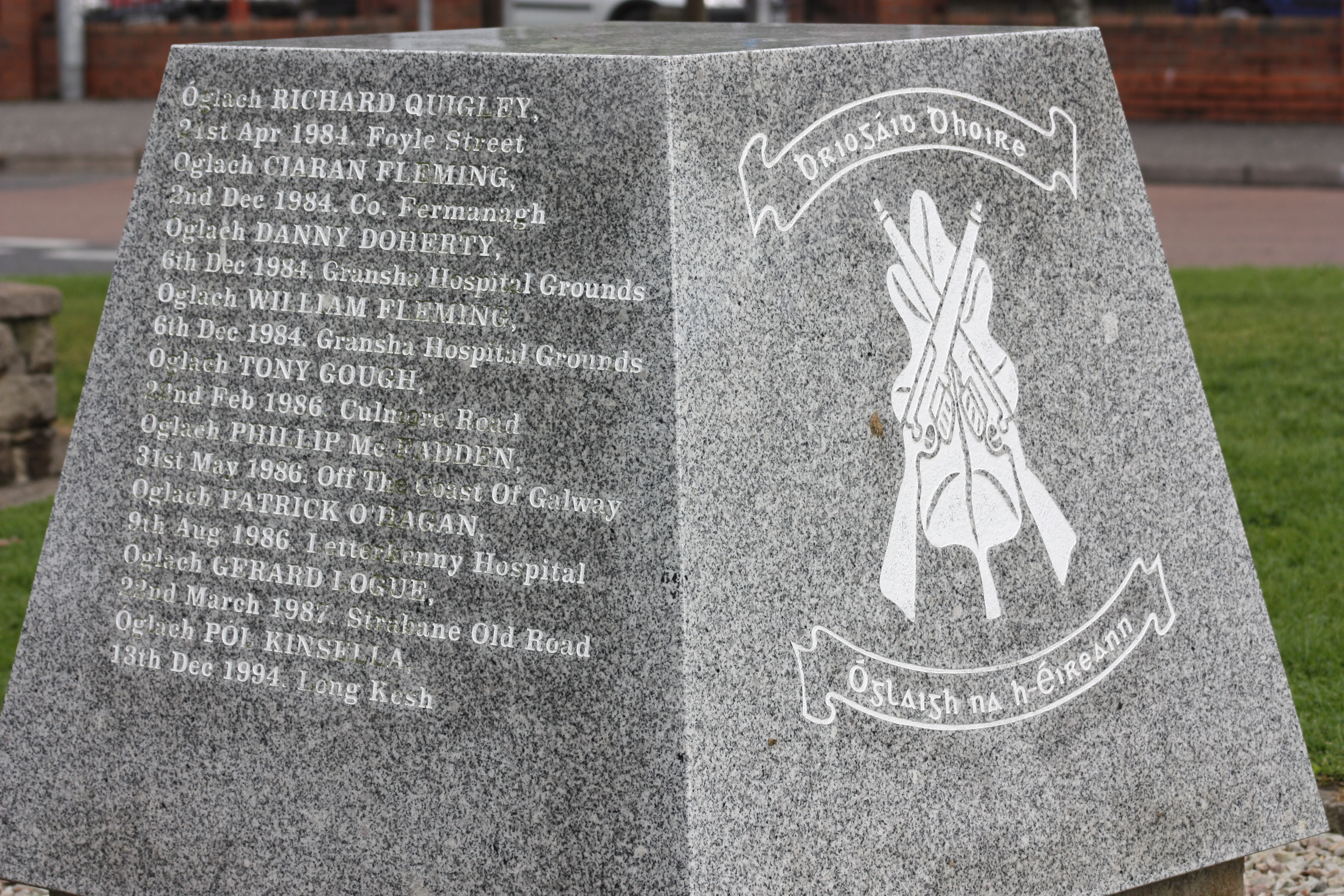
Derry Brigade Memorial, Bogside, Derry, August 2009

William James Paul Fleming (1965 – 6 December 1984) was a volunteer in the Derry Brigade of the Provisional Irish Republican Army (IRA) from the predominantly republican "Top of the Hill" area of the Waterside, Derry, Northern Ireland.

Fleming was killed along with fellow volunteer Danny Doherty after they were ambushed in the grounds of Gransha Hospital by Special Air Service (SAS) and 14 soldiers of the British Army on 6 December 1984.

== Background ==
Fleming was the sixth of seven children and the youngest of four sons of Leo and Betty Fleming. Fleming grew up in the Waterside area to the east of Derry City. Three of his brothers were interned during the Troubles and his wider family were also involved in the republican movement.

Fleming had worked in a number of pubs in the Derry area, and in the months prior to his death had been working at the Rocking Chair Bar in Derry. He was noted as having a quiet and jovial disposition which suited his profession as a barman.

In 1984 Fleming spent a week in Hydebank Detention Centre in Belfast after he refused to pay a fine he was given after being found guilty of damaging a Royal Ulster Constabulary vehicle.

William Fleming was a cousin of Ciaran Fleming. They died within four days of each other, both while with Active Service Units. His sister Lynn Fleming is a Sinn Féin representative for the Waterside area.

== Paramilitary activities ==
Fleming became a member of Na Fianna Éireann during his early teens and later joined the IRA when he turned 17.

On 6 December 1984, Fleming and Doherty were riding around on a motorbike in the grounds of Gransha Hospital, approximately four miles from Derry city centre. The hospital was also the administrative headquarters of the Western Health and Social Services Board. It was reported at the time that the pair had gone to the hospital in an attempt to assassinate an off-duty member of the Ulster Defence Regiment who was employed there, and had intended to carry it out during a staff shift change at 8 a.m. The SAS were aware that an IRA operation had been planned to take place in the vicinity of the hospital after receiving a tip-off from an intelligence source. An SAS unit from the Derry Detachment of 14 Intelligence Company, without the knowledge of the Royal Ulster Constabulary or the hospital authorities, located troops at the site keeping watch for two weeks prior to 6 December. However, they had minimal prior information as to how the attack was to be executed and when.

At 8 a.m., Fleming and Doherty were spotted on the motorbike by the SAS sentries who were located within an unmarked car, which proceeded to ram it, dislodging Fleming from the pillion seat and causing the motorcycle to go out of control. Fleming was then approached by two other SAS troopers who opened fire and killed him, claiming subsequently that he was armed and they considered him a direct threat. The motorcycle meanwhile had struck a kerb and thrown Doherty to the ground, where he was opened fire upon by the British Army soldiers and also killed. Subsequent forensic evidence showed that six bullets struck Doherty whilst he was on the ground, and Fleming's autopsy showed that he had four gunshot wounds to his head and 56 to his trunk and torso. During the inquest into the shootings, the coroner stated that Doherty had three gunshot wounds to the head and a further twenty one shots to his body.

== Reactions to the killings ==
Irish Minister for Foreign Affairs, Peter Barry, stated that "in Northern Ireland, under British rule, it was the army who set the ambush – it was an ambush, nothing else. No attempt to arrest was made. The men were shot dead without any chance to surrender."

Bishop Edward Daly rhetorically asked "do members of the Army have the right to use more force than appears necessary?"

Gregory Campbell, Democratic Unionist Party spokesman, said "I am delighted that the two IRA men were intercepted and executed by the undercover army unit. The only way the IRA will be dealt with is when they are executed. They deal in death and must be dealt with in death."

John Hume then Social Democratic and Labour Party leader told the House of Commons, "This raises very fundamental questions as to whether the authorities have abandoned the rule of law, and whether we are now in a war situation."

== Funeral ==
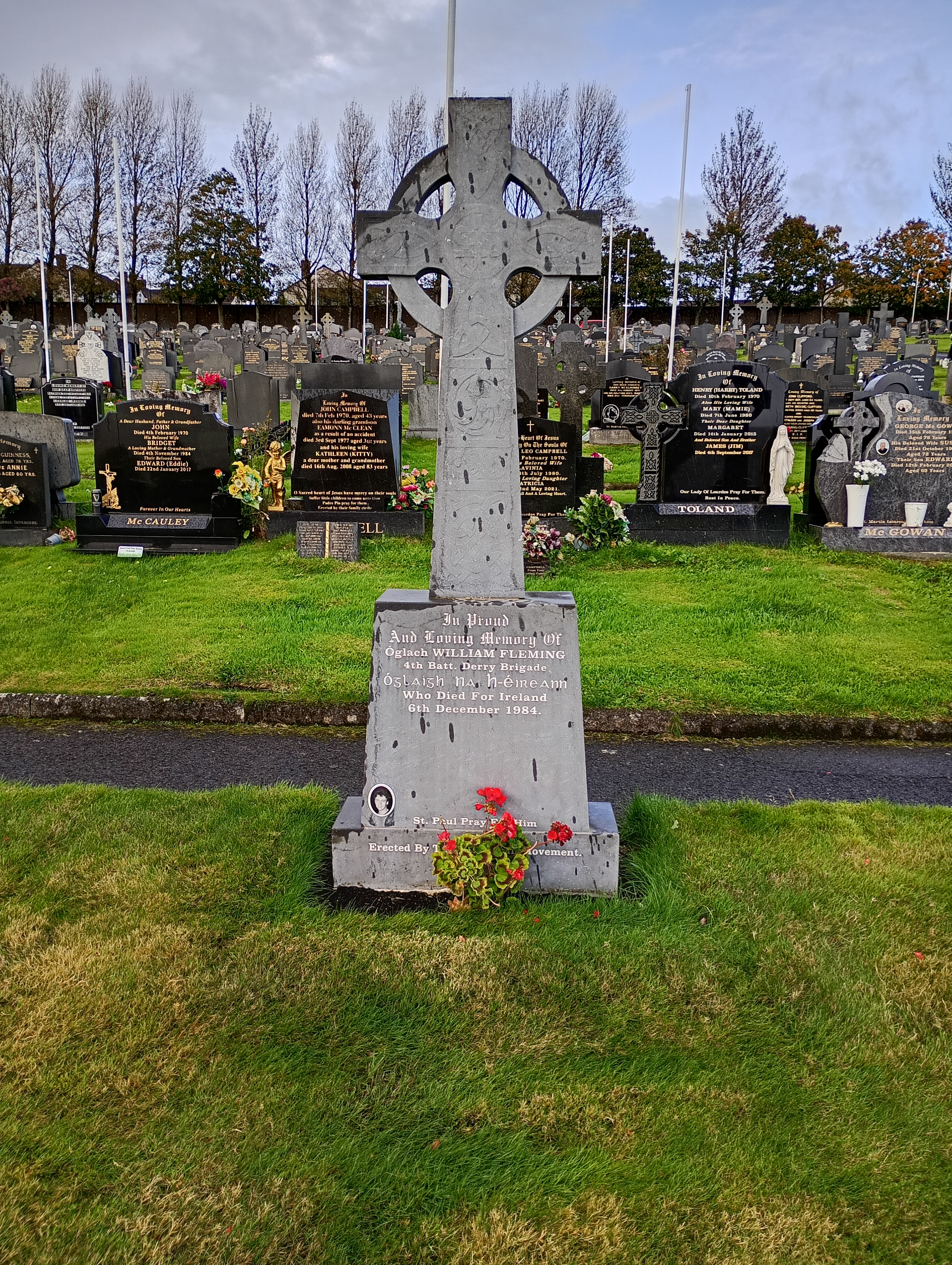
Fleming's grave in Derry City Cemetery

Fleming's funeral procession departed from the Waterside and combined with the procession of Danny Doherty, which came from the Creggan estate on the south west side of the city. The funeral was the largest in Derry City since the death of hunger striker Patsy O'Hara. Both coffins had been dressed in the customary fashion with Irish tricolours and a colour party of IRA volunteers fired volleys of shots over the coffins.

In excess of 3,000 mourners followed the funeral procession to the City Cemetery in Derry where Sinn Féin's Martin McGuinness gave the graveside oration, and stated: '"We are an occupied country and those brave enough to fight repression deserve nothing but respect and unfailing support from us all. Only the IRA can bring Britain to the negotiating table."

== Judicial review of SAS soldiers' prosecution ==
In November 2004, the Public Prosecution Service for Northern Ireland decided not to prosecute three of the SAS soldiers involved in the killing of Fleming and Doherty.

Julie Doherty, the widow of Danny Doherty, submitted an application for a judicial review to be held into the killing of her husband and Fleming. This application was dismissed by Mr Justice Girvan. In his reserved judgement, Girvan said the decision not to prosecute could not be challenged as it was based on the prosecutor's assessment of the evidence. In addition, Girvan stated "The no prosecution decision was made in 1986. In 2004 it is much too late for the applicant to seek effectively to re-open a decision made in 1986 and not challenged within a reasonable time thereafter."

Though the application for the judicial review failed, the jury at Doherty's inquest did criticise the five-man army unit for not attempting to arrest him or inform the RUC of the operation earlier, through which they suggested his life might have been saved.
