= Red Devils (Parachute Regiment) =

British Parachute Regiment team

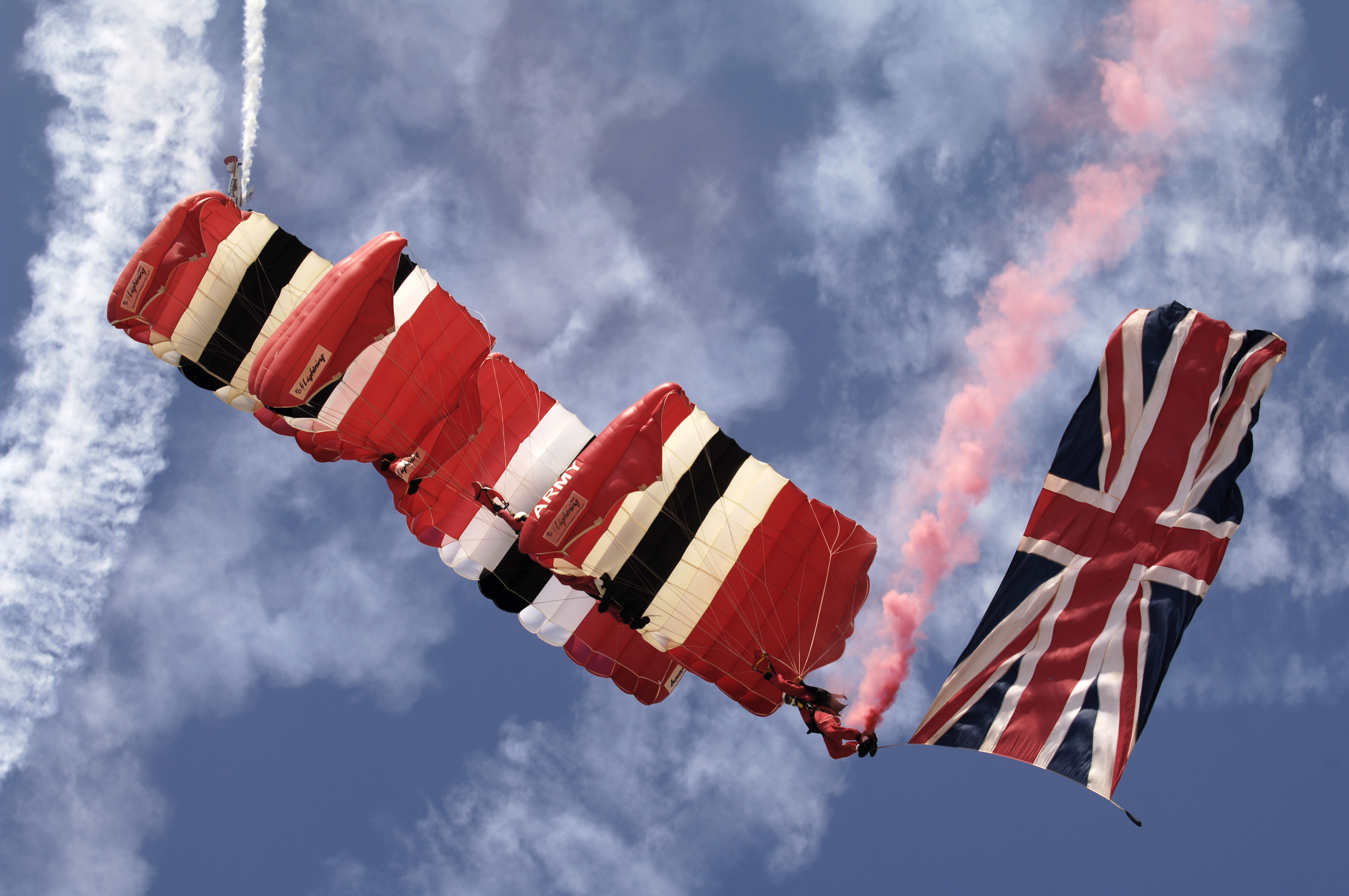
Red Devils team members present the Union Jack at an American air show in 2005

The Red Devils are the British Parachute Regiment's parachute display team. The Red Devils are regular serving paratroopers from the four battalions of the Parachute Regiment who have volunteered to serve on the display team. Like other members of the regiment, they wear the maroon beret that designates airborne forces.

As the official parachute display team of the British Army, the team regularly perform at air shows and other events.

== History ==
Colonel Edward Gardener created the team in 1964 as the Parachute Regiment Free Fall Team and was their commander in the first year. They became the official parachute display team of the British Army in 1979. Their name derives from the nickname given to members of the Parachute Regiment by German forces in the North African campaign of the Second World War; the paratroopers jumped wearing the Denison smock, whose rear flap gave the effect of a tail, and became coated in red earth on landing.

In July 2022, two Red Devils team members broke the Guinness World Record for the largest flag down-planed while skydiving, measuring 450 square metres (4,800 sq ft). In 2023, five team members pioneered a new stunt, 'the Pentagram', in which their parachutes are joined at a single point.

At Whitehaven Air Show in June 2015, a team member became entangled during a stunt collision, but his partner was able to bring him safely to the ground. In October 2022, a member of the team was killed in an unplanned manoeuvre while off-duty.

== Notable members ==
- Charles "Nish" Bruce (1978–1982).
