= Antoine Mac Giolla Bhrighde =

Member of the Provisional Irish Republican Army

- Born: 29 August 1957; Desertmartin, County Londonderry, Northern Ireland
- Died: 2 December 1984 (aged 27); Kesh, County Fermanagh, Northern Ireland
- Military career
- Allegiance: Provisional Irish Republican Army
- Service years: – 1984
- Conflicts: The Troubles

Antoine Mac Giolla Bhrighde (Irish: [mˠək ˈɟɪl̪ˠə ˈvʲɾʲiːdʲə] 29 August 1957 – 2 December 1984), English Tony or Anthony MacBride (also misspelled McBride), was a Provisional Irish Republican Army (IRA) volunteer from Desertmartin, County Londonderry, Northern Ireland. He was shot dead by the British Army in 1984 whilst engaged in an attack on the Royal Ulster Constabulary.

== Background ==
Mac Giolla Bhrighde was the eldest son of Frank and Nora MacBride. He had two sisters, Marie and Patricia and three brothers, Damian, Lughaidh and Oistín.

The MacBride family moved from their South Londonderry home to the Knock Road, Belfast, in 1964. It was then that Mac Giolla Bhrighde was introduced to physical force republicanism by his maternal grandmother, also called Nora, who was involved in the Irish War of Independence in the 1920s.

The MacBride family later moved to Killowen Street, which is located in a predominantly loyalist area of east Belfast. The family home was subjected to a number of attacks from loyalists. The attacks came in the form of window breaking and an attempted bombing but culminated in 1972 with the shooting of Mac Giolla Bhrighde and his father Frank.

In May 1972, two loyalist gunmen called to the MacBride family's door and Nora MacBride, who was carrying a baby at the time, went to answer the door. The men duped Mrs. MacBride into opening the door by stating that they were looking for Frank, a building contractor, and were seeking work. When the door was opened the gunmen then saw Frank coming down the narrow hallway to see who was at the door. They opened fire shooting Frank in the shoulder, hand and thighs, then Antoine came out from a side room to protect his father and was shot in the leg. Frank MacBride was hit by 12 bullets and never recovered from the attack, dying 17 months later.

== Irish Army ==
Immediately after the shooting the family moved to Newtownards, County Down, and in the mid-1970s Mac Giolla Bhrighde left Northern Ireland to join the Irish Army in the Republic of Ireland. The MacBride family then moved again, this time returning to their native County Londonderry. Mac Giolla Bhrighde served in the Irish Army for less than a year before being court-martialled for desertion and was dishonourably discharged.

== Paramilitary activities ==
After dismissal from the Irish Army, Mac Giolla Bhrighde joined the South Derry Brigade of the IRA, and was active in rural areas of County Londonderry. In 1979 he was stopped by Royal Ulster Constabulary officers near Magherafelt while in possession of a rifle, and was detained at Strabane police station, being subsequently imprisoned for three years.

He was noted for his hard line militarism in the early 1980s, and supported a strategy of forming full-time IRA guerrilla units or flying columns based in the Republic, which would carry out four or five large-scale attacks across the border into Northern Ireland a year, retreating back across the border into the Republic of Ireland after each attack, to deny British Forces the chance for fully engaging them. This strategy was espoused by the militant Provisional IRA East Tyrone Brigade led by Padraig McKearney and Jim Lynagh, who wanted an escalation of the conflict to what they termed total war. They were opposed by Kevin McKenna, the IRA Chief of Staff, and by the republican leadership based around Gerry Adams, on the grounds that actions of that scale were too big a risk and unsustainable. The IRA leadership wanted a smaller scale campaign of attrition, supplemented by political campaigning by Sinn Féin.

=== Norwegian link ===
After his release from prison Mac Giolla Bhrighde, who had made a number of friends and contacts in Norway, became involved in providing information for the Irish republican cause throughout Scandinavia.

== Kesh ambush and death ==
After returning from a trip to Norway, in the early hours of Sunday morning on 2 December 1984 Mac Giolla Bhrighde and Ciaran Fleming stole a Toyota van in Pettigo, County Donegal, in the Republic of Ireland. The van was then loaded with 9 beer kegs, each containing 100 lbs of low explosives, which they drove across the border into Northern Ireland to Kesh, a village in the north of County Fermanagh. At the Drumrush Lodge Restaurant, just outside Kesh, they planted a landmine in a lane leading to the restaurant and wired up a device which was connected to an observation point. Having set this ambush, a hoax call was made to the Royal Ulster Constabulary to lure the British Army to the restaurant on the pretence that there was a firebomb planted within it. After a while Mac Giolla Bhrighde saw a Royal Ulster Constabulary police vehicle approaching the restaurant, and gave the detonation code word "one", however, on switching the electric trigger the mine failed to detonate. There was another car parked in the car park which Mac Giolla Bhrighde believed contained civilians, and he left the stolen van from which he was observing to warn them to leave the area.

=== Conflicting accounts of his death ===
According to the republican sources, when he approached the car two Special Air Service (SAS) soldiers got out and ordered him to halt and drop his gun. Mac Giolla Bhrighde, who was unarmed, informed the SAS of this and then one of the SAS men stepped forward and shot him on his left side. After which he was then handcuffed and shot dead. However, according to CAIN, there was a gun battle at the scene of the attempted bombing between a number of IRA men and British troops, in which Mac Giolla Bhrighde was killed in the exchange of fire. A British Army soldier, Sergeant Al Slater, of the Special Air Service was killed in the fire-fight. Charles "Nish" Bruce served with Al Slater on this operation. His autobiography, Freefall, under the pseudonym Tom Read, accounts in detail the exchange of fire and the respective deaths of both Slater and Mac Giolla Bhrighde. Mac Giolla Bhrighde's companion Ciarán Fleming drowned in the swollen Bannagh River as he fled the scene attempting to escape Crown forces pursuit.

The British Army officially listed Slater as a member of the Parachute Regiment, however, an obituary appeared in the SAS magazine, Mars & Minerva, stating that Slater was a member of 7 Troop (Free Fall) 'B' Squadron of the SAS.

== Memorial ==
In 2002 a controversy occurred when a memorial to Mac Giolla Bhrighde, Fleming and Joe MacManus was sited close to the place where Protestant workmen William Hassard and Frederick Love were killed by the IRA in 1988. A Sinn Féin spokesman stated that "The families of Ciaran Fleming, Joseph McManus and Antoine Mac Giolla Bhrighde, the three IRA men commemorated by the monument, had given the go-ahead for the structure to be moved".

== Legacy ==
The Republican Sinn Féin party branch in Glenade, County Leitrim is known as the Kieran Fleming/Tony McBride Cumann after Ciaran Fleming and Antoine Mac Giolla Bhrighde.

== See also ==
- The Troubles in Kesh
