= Kesh, County Fermanagh =

Coordinates: 54.522°N 7.723°W

Kesh: Irish: An Cheis
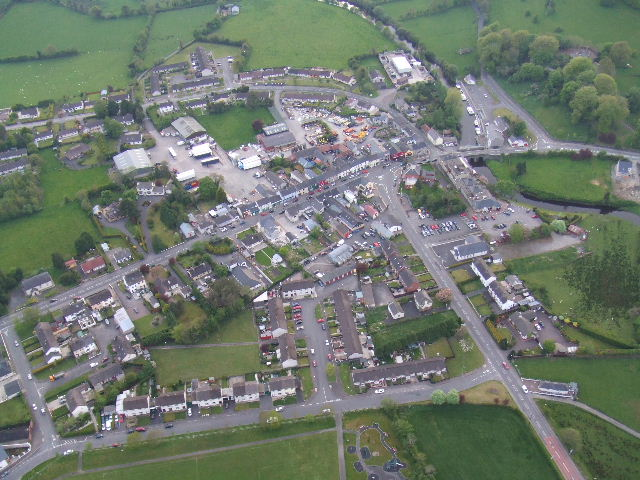

- Location within Northern Ireland
- Population: 1,098 (2021 Census)
- District: Fermanagh and Omagh
- County: County Fermanagh
- Country: Northern Ireland
- Sovereign state: United Kingdom
- Post town: Enniskillen
- Postcode district: BT93
- Dialling code: 028
- UK Parliament: Fermanagh and South Tyrone
- NI Assembly: Fermanagh and South Tyrone

Kesh (from Irish Ceis 'wicker bridge') is a village in County Fermanagh, Northern Ireland. It is on the Kesh River about 1 mile (1.6 km) from Lower Lough Erne. The 2011 Census recorded a population of 1,039 people. which grew to 1098 residents in 2021. It is within Fermanagh and Omagh district.

Because of its location close to Lough Erne the village has been a popular tourist resort. It has two caravan parks, a small attractive marina and other related industries both within its boundaries and the surrounding area. It is about 5 miles (8 km) from the border with the Republic of Ireland and 22 miles (35 km) from the Atlantic coast resort of Rossnowlagh in County Donegal.

== History ==
=== Name ===
The toponym Kesh comes from ceis, the Irish word for 'wicker bridge', which refers to the crossing in the middle of the village. The village is not built around a parish church or chapel. Two Church of Ireland parishes of Magherculmoney and Tubrid meet at the river and their respective parish churches are each about 2 miles (3 km) either side of the village.

Kesh began as a ford or crossing place on the Glendarragh River. In the past, Lough Erne came very much closer to the village than it does today. Before the first great Erne Drainage in the 1880s, the lake was about eight feet higher and, especially in time of flood, may almost have reached Kesh. The ráth on Rosscah Hill above the late Joe Robert's house (a former rectory of Drumkeeran Parish) indicates original settlement here probably as far back as the Iron Age, c. 2000 years ago. There are two ráths on this hill, but the nearer to the house is believed to be a decorative feature made at the time of the construction of the house in the late 1700s. The large standing stone in Rosculban may be a relic of the Iron Age as well.

After a time, the ford was augmented with a wicker bridge, for which the Gaelic word is ceis, and hence the village got its name. The name had been spelt in varying ways but generally as Kish or Cash until relatively modern times.

=== Crevenish Castle ===
The remains of Crevenish Castle are south-east of the village on the Crevenish Road, or 'the back road' as the locals call it. During its time it was home to the Blennerhasset and Maguire families in the seventeenth-century and eighteenth-century.

=== The Troubles ===
On 2 December 1984, 28-year old Alistair Slater, a member of 22 SAS of the British Army, and 27-year-old Antoine Mac Giolla Bhrighde, a Provisional Irish Republican Army (IRA) volunteer, were both shot dead during an IRA ambush and a gun battle between an undercover 22 SAS British Army units and an IRA active service unit near Kesh. 26-year old Kieran Fleming, an IRA volunteer, drowned in the Bannagh River, near Kesh, as he tried to escape from the gun battle, in what became known as the Kesh ambush. The IRA men had been attempting to bomb a Royal Ulster Constabulary police car in Kesh. Slater was posthumously awarded the Military Medal for his bravery in the action.

== Tourism ==
Tourist facilities in the area include:

- The Lough Erne Hotel, originally a Royal Irish Constabulary barracks, later a tapestry house, and now the only hotel in Kesh by the Glendurragh River at the top of the main street. Still has the old gaol doors intact from the 1800s.
- North Fermanagh Club, a football (during winter) and cricket (during summer) venue on the Crevenish Road

== Education ==
While the date that Kesh Primary School was established is unknown, the Clogher Records record a school in Kesh, Rosscolban in 1820 beside the schoolmaster's house. The original building was built in 1865 (as marked on the memorial stone on the front of the school). In 1957, the Right Hon Edward Archdale paid for the renovation of the school of one classroom making it into three classrooms and a PE hall. As many children were demanding enrolment as a result of the closure of other rural schools at the time, WELB decided to build a new school in 2001. Building started in 2006 and the same year the school was ready to intake approximately 200 children.

== Notable people ==
- Jon Armstrong, driver in the World Rally Championship
- Kyle Lafferty, former Rangers player, born in Kesh

== Transport ==
Kesh railway station on the Enniskillen and Bundoran Railway was opened on 13 June 1866 and closed on 1 October 1957.

The railway, which arrived in Kesh in 1866, provided employment to the area and a focus for traffic to and from the station. Hardware shops and shops providing for the needs of farmers could now carry a greater variety of goods, and cattle and other livestock could be transported to distant markets after being bought in local fairs. Butter and eggs could be produced in greater quantities and markets in Belfast and Dublin be reached by train.

Ulsterbus route numbers 194 (Enniskillen to Pettigo) and 83A (Omagh to Kesh) stop in Kesh.

== Demography ==
On census day in 2011 (27 March 2011), the usually resident population of Kesh Settlement was 1,039, accounting for 0.06% of the NI total. Of these:

- 18.67% were aged under 16 and 16.84% were aged 65 and over
- 49.57% of the population were male and 50.43% were female
- 19.35% belong to or were brought up in the Catholic religion and 76.9% belong to or were brought up in a 'Protestant and Other Christian (including Christian related)' religion; and
- 72.67% indicated that they had a British national identity, 10.68% had an Irish national identity and 22.81% had a Northern Irish national identity.
