= Gransha Hospital =

- Western Health and Social Care Trust
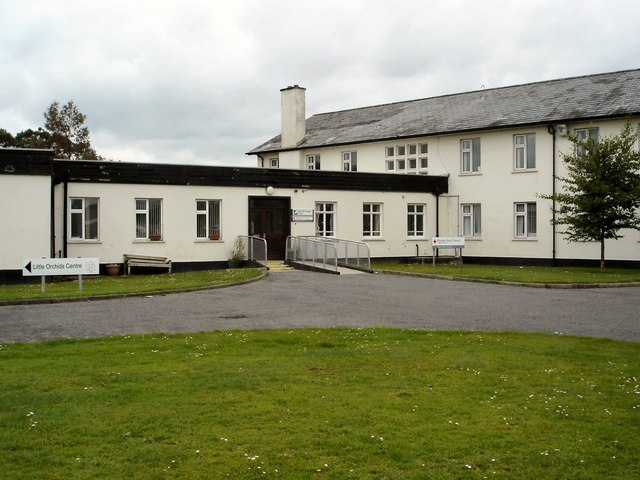
- Part of the old Gransha Hospital

- Location in Northern Ireland

Geography
- Location: Clooney Road, Derry, Northern Ireland
- Coordinates: 55.0154°N 7.2794°W

Organisation
- Care system: Health and Social Care in Northern Ireland
- Type: Community

History
- Founded: 1905

Gransha Hospital was a health facility in Clooney Road, Derry, Northern Ireland. The site is managed by Western Health and Social Care Trust.

== History ==
The facility was commissioned to replace the aging Londonderry County Asylum on Strand Road, which had become overcrowded.

The first sod was cut for the new building on Clooney Road on 1 June 1903. It was designed by Matthew Alexander Robinson in the Victorian style, built in brick with a cement render finish and was completed in May 1905.

After joining the National Health Service in 1948, the facility evolved to become the Stradreagh Hospital.

Two gate lodges were added in the 1960s. Following the introduction of Care in the Community in the early 1980s the hospital went into a period of decline and almost all buildings in the old hospital were closed by December 2011.

The main building of the old hospital was occupied by Oakgrove Integrated College on a temporary basis from 1992 until the college moved into modern purpose-built accommodation in 2004. It was subsequently left to decay and was badly damaged in a serious fire in March 2016.

== Current facilities ==
The following modern facilities have been established at Gransha Park, the site of the old hospital:

- Grangewood Hospital, which was designed by Avanti Architects in collaboration with Kennedy Fitzgerald and built by Heron Brothers at a cost of £10.8 million, was completed in November 2012. The 30-bed hospital provides inpatient acute mental health care services.
- Lakeview Hospital, which was built at a cost of £4.8 million, was completed in October 2005. The 43-bed facility provides assessment and treatment for people with learning and mental health problems.
- Waterside Hospital, which dates back to the 1970s, was partially refurbished in 2014. The facility provides services for elderly people including dementia sufferers.
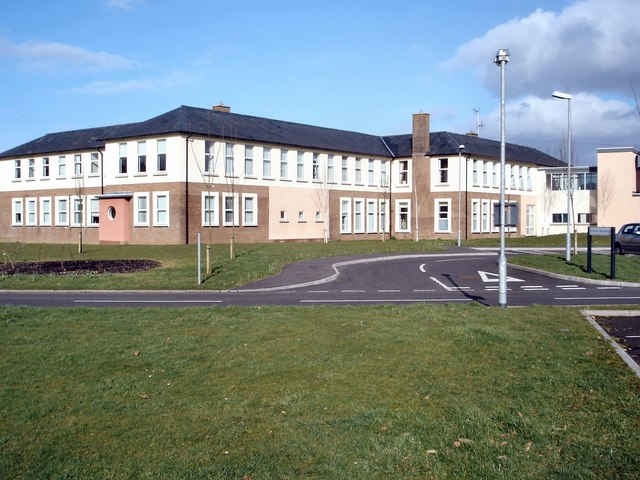
Lakeview Hospital

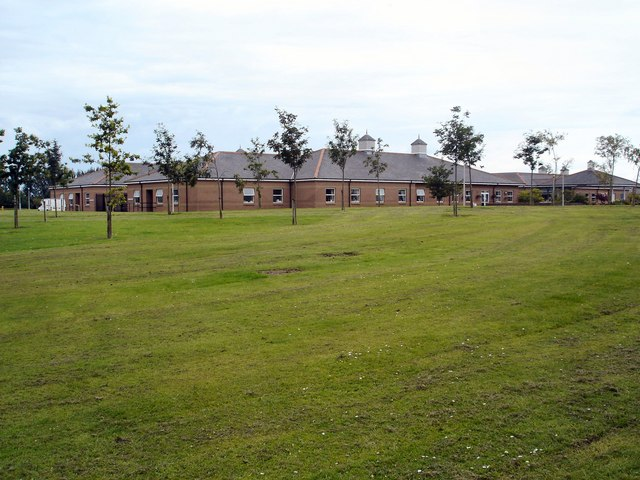
Waterside Hospital
