= Kieran Fleming =

Irish Republican (1959–1984)

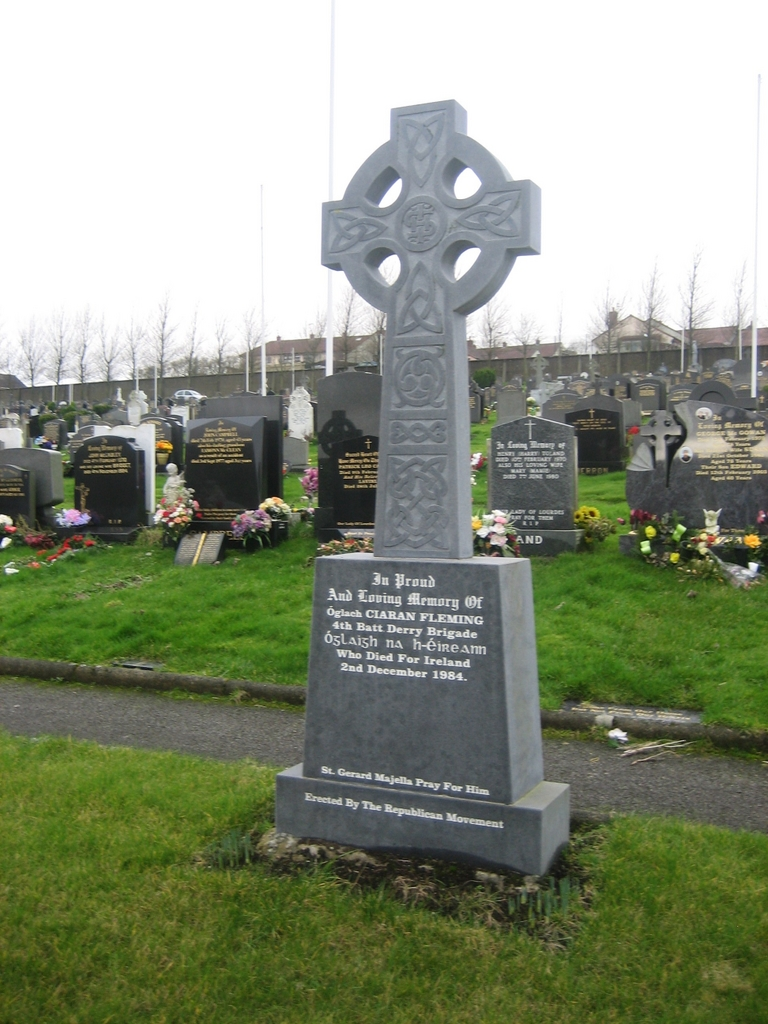
Monument erected to Ciaran Fleming.

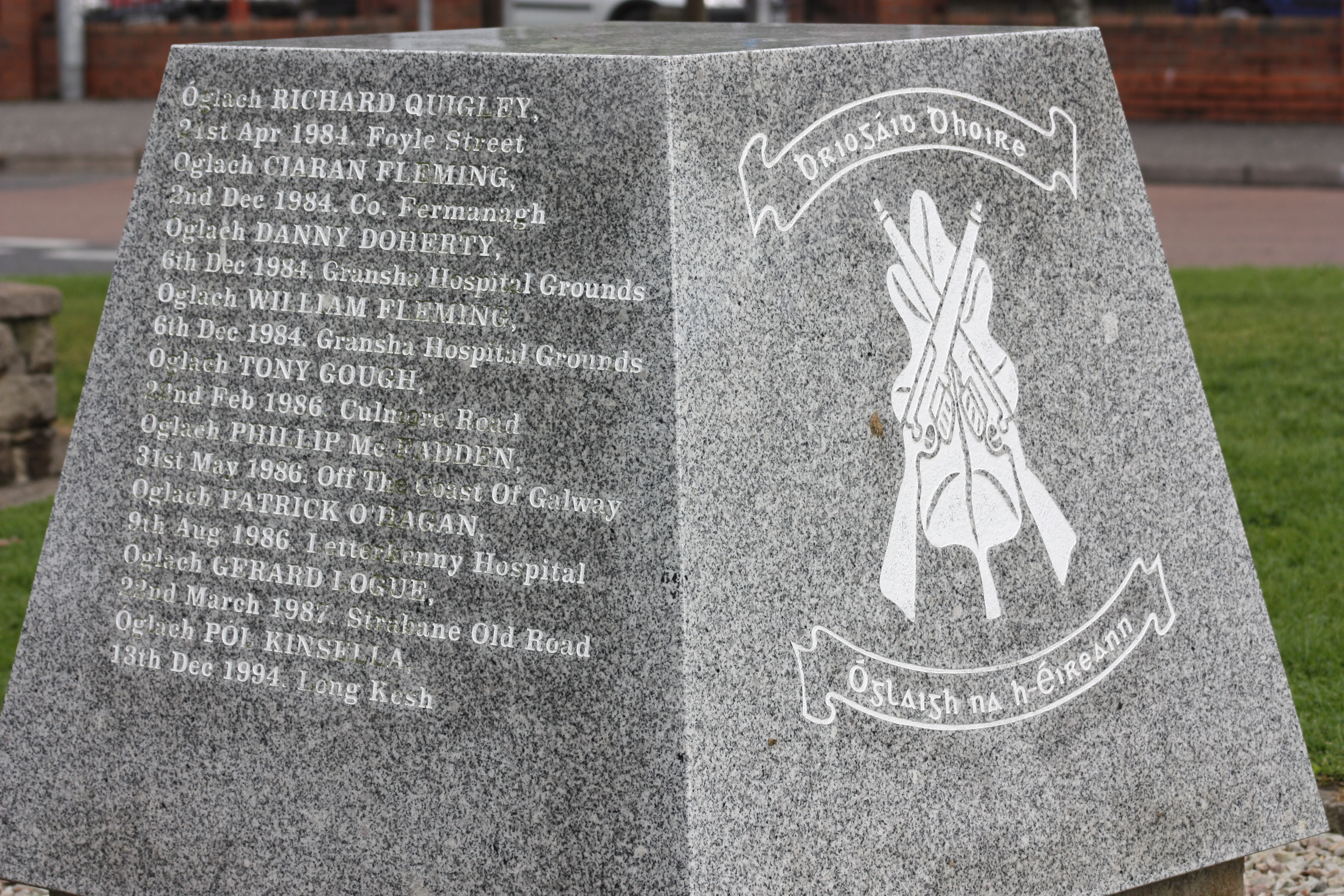
Derry Brigade Memorial, Bogside, Derry, August 2009

Kieran or Ciarán Fleming (25 October 1959 – 2 December 1984), was a volunteer in the 4th Battalion, Derry Brigade of the Provisional Irish Republican Army (IRA) from the Waterside area of Derry, Northern Ireland. He died while attempting to escape after a confrontation with British troops in 1984.

== Background ==
Fleming was the youngest son of Paddy and Maud Fleming and grew up in the waterside area of Derry.

== Paramilitary activities ==
Fleming became involved in the Irish republican movement from an early age and spent most of his formative years imprisoned in the republican H-Blocks of HMP Maze. He was convicted of the murder of Royal Ulster Constabulary (RUC) officer Linda Baggley in 1976 and imprisoned.

=== Maze Escape ===
On 23 September 1983, Fleming was involved in the Maze Prison escape, the largest break-out of prisoners in Europe since World War II and in British prison history. Fleming, along with 37 other republican prisoners, armed with 6 hand-guns, hijacked a prison meals lorry and smashed their way out of HMP Maze past 40 prison wardens and 28 alarm systems. During the escape Gerry Kelly shot and injured a prison warden as the officer attempted to foil the escape.

=== Tactical outlook ===
Fleming, according to IRA sources quoted by journalist Ed Moloney was noted for his hard line militarist republicanism. He is reputed to have backed a plan to form full-time guerilla units or flying columns based in the Republic, which would carry out four or five large scale attacks in the north a year. This approach was espoused by the militant Provisional IRA East Tyrone Brigade led by Padraig McKearney and Jim Lynagh, who wanted an escalation of the conflict to what they termed "total war". They were opposed by Kevin McKenna, the IRA Chief of Staff and by the republican leadership headed by Gerry Adams, on the grounds that actions on that scale were too big a risk and unsustainable. The IRA leadership wanted a smaller scale campaign of attrition, supplemented by political campaigning by Sinn Féin.

=== Kesh ambush and death ===
On Sunday morning, 2 December 1984, Fleming and Antoine Mac Giolla Bhrighde stole a Toyota van in Pettigo, County Donegal. The van was then loaded with nine beer kegs, each containing 100 lb of explosives. They then crossed the border and travelled to Kesh, County Fermanagh. At the Drumrush Lodge Restaurant just outside Kesh they then planted a landmine in a lane leading to the restaurant and wired up a device which was connected to an observation point. From there a hoax call was made in order to lure the British Army to the restaurant on the pretense that there was a firebomb planted within the restaurant.

MacGiolla Bhrighde observed a RUC patrol car approaching the restaurant and gave the detonation code word "one". However, the mine failed to explode. MacGiolla Bhrighde and British Army soldier Alistair Slater were both killed during the operation. Fleming and the remainder of the ASU then came under fire from the SAS unit and retreated. Fleming, unable to swim, became trapped between the SAS units and the swollen River Bannagh and was swept away and drowned.

=== Funeral ===
Trouble erupted at the funeral of Fleming. Mourners were baton-charged by the police, who were determined not to allow any paramilitary displays. The RUC fired plastic bullets as a riot ensued and Fleming’s coffin was maneuvered through the streets into the Bogside, then to the cemetery “where Martin [McGuinness], an IRA firing party and others were waiting.”

== Monument controversy ==
In 2002, a row erupted when a monument to Fleming, MacGiolla Bhrighde and Sligo Volunteer Joe MacManus was sited close to the place where Protestant workmen William Hassard and Frederick Love were killed by the IRA in 1988.

== See also ==
- The Troubles in Kesh
