= Alistair Slater =

British soldier (1956–1984)

Sergeant Al Slater
- Born: 25 July 1956; Leicestershire, England
- Died: 2 December 1984 (aged 28); Kesh, County Fermanagh, Northern Ireland
- Military career
- Allegiance: United Kingdom
- Branch: British Army
- Service years: 1974–1984
- Rank: Sergeant
- Units: The Parachute Regiment; Special Air Service
- Conflicts: The Troubles: Operation Banner; Kesh ambush †
- Awards: Military Medal

Sergeant Alastair Slater, MM (25 July 1956 – 2 December 1984) was a British Army soldier who served in 'B' Squadron, Air (7) Troop, 22 Special Air Service (SAS), who was killed on 2 December 1984 in a confrontation with the Provisional Irish Republican Army in Kesh, a village in County Fermanagh in Northern Ireland. The operation led to the deaths of Provisional Irish Republican Army Volunteers Antoine Mac Giolla Bhrighde and Kieran Fleming, and the arrest of the others. The IRA members had been attempting to ambush a Royal Ulster Constabulary police car with a land mine at the time. Slater was posthumously awarded the Military Medal for his role in the action.

Prior to joining the SAS, Slater was a member of 1 Para. He appeared in the 1982 British TV documentary The Paras as one of the instructors of a group of Parachute Regiment recruits undertaking their basic training. The programme began filming just prior to the Falklands War.

Slater was one of four SAS soldiers to be killed during The Troubles.
