= Conflict Archive on the Internet =

Database covering the Troubles and sectarian violence

CAIN Conflict Archive on the Internet
- Website type: Archive
- Owner: N/A
- Creator: Various
- Website: cain.ulster.ac.uk
- Commercial: No
- Registration: No

CAIN (Conflict Archive on the Internet) is a database containing information about conflict and politics in Northern Ireland from 1968 to the present. The project began in 1996, with the website launching in 1997. The project is based within Ulster University at its Magee campus. The archive chronicles important events during the Troubles, stretching from 1968 until the present day. The name is an allusion to the Biblical Cain, who murdered his brother Abel.

CAIN is affiliated with the Access Research Knowledge (ARK), website established in 2000 by researchers at Queen's University Belfast and Ulster University. Its primary stated goal is to "increase the accessibility and use of academic data and research". The ARK website is intended for use by researchers, teachers, schoolchildren, policy makers, journalists, community/voluntary sector workers and "anyone with an interest in Northern Ireland Society and Politics". It contains sections on elections, policy, ageing, surveys, publications and teaching.

The site includes the Sutton Index of Deaths, containing information on every death which occurred as a result of the conflict. The information is taken from Malcolm Sutton's book Bear in Mind These Dead, the title of which is taken from a poem by John Hewitt. Sutton's original book listed deaths from 1969 until 1993, since updated until 2001. The information can be viewed chronologically, alphabetically and a full search functionality is included. Information can also be crosstabulated by the status of the victim, the organisation responsible and several other variables. Dr Martin Melaugh, the director of the project, has produced draft lists of further deaths related to the conflict from 2002 to date.

== Funding ==
In addition to funding from Ulster University, CAIN is also bankrolled to a large extent by Atlantic Philanthropies. In 1998 CAIN was directly funded through the Department of Education for Northern Ireland and the Central Community Relations Unit. Its first donor, however, was the Electronic Libraries Programme of the Higher Education Funding Councils.

The institutions of higher learning that created CAIN, in addition to Ulster University, were the Queen's University, which worked in concert with the Linen Hall Library. Other important contributors to this project's inception and development were the Center for the Study of Conflict, Educational Services, and INCORE, which stands for the Initiative on Conflict Resolution and Ethnicity.

== Users ==
According to its official website CAIN is specifically targeting the higher education sector in the United Kingdom, although it claims that over two-thirds of its users come from outside of Great Britain and Ireland, dividing them into three categories:

- One third from Britain and Ireland;
- One third from the United States of America;
- One third from the rest of the world.

== History ==
Although originally conceived as a website focusing exclusively on sectarian conflict in Northern Ireland, with particular emphasis on the violent aspects of these disputes, CAIN eventually expanded to encompass a much broader overview of politics and culture in Northern Ireland, including key historical events.
