= Provisional IRA Derry Brigade =

Derry Brigade
- Allegiance: Provisional Irish Republican Army
- Size: 50 active members
- Area of operations: Derry city, Northern Ireland
- Main actions: 1990 Proxy bomb attack at Coshquin

Commanders
- Notable commanders: Martin McGuinness; William McGuiness

The Derry Brigade of the Provisional Irish Republican Army (IRA) operated in the city of Derry, Northern Ireland, and its surroundings during the Troubles. The Derry Brigade was one of the most active groups in the IRA.

== Origins ==
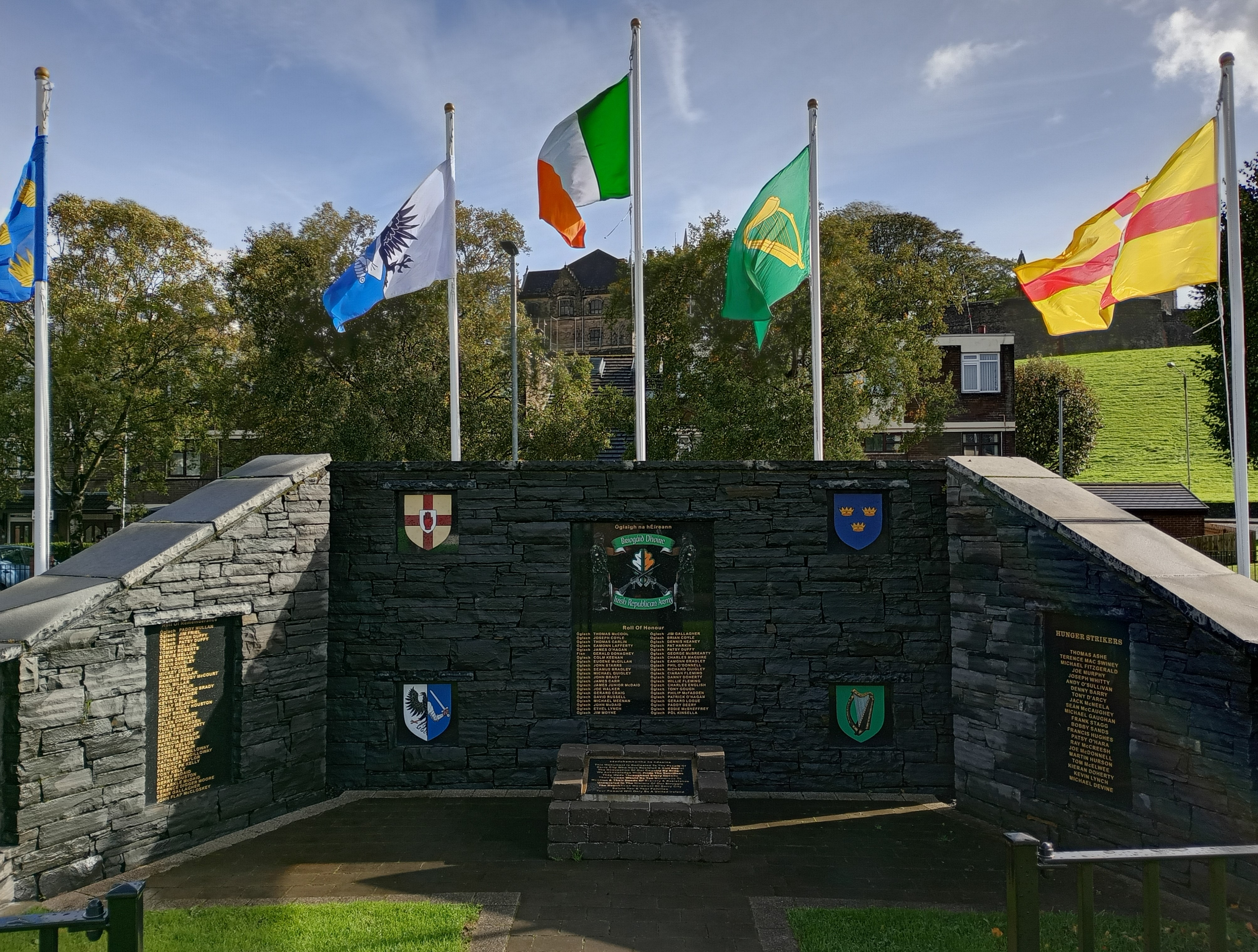
Derry Brigade memorial at Free Derry Corner

A small IRA battalion existed in Derry since the Troubles began, but it never had a steady number of volunteers until Bloody Sunday, which saw an influx of new recruits.

== Structure and operational area ==
The Derry Brigade was organised in three different levels. The highest position was occupied by the Brigade's officer commanding, the top IRA ranking in the city. Beneath him was the ten-men Derry Brigade Command, made of experienced IRA volunteers, among them one or two prominent Sinn Féin politicians. The lower layer was the Command Staff, which includes the quarter-master, the engineering department, the financial department and internal affairs, the latter to deal with informers. The Brigade strength was around 50 active members.

The Command Staff, through their Officer Commanders, operated active service units in the four republican strongholds of the city: Bogside/Brandywell district, Creggan, Waterside and Shantallow.

== Notable IRA actions within the brigade's operational area ==
- 27 October 1971 - two British soldiers, David Tilbury (aged 29) and Angus Stevens (aged 18), were killed in an IRA bomb attack on an observation post at the rear of Rosemount RUC/British Army base, Derry.
- 7 July 1972 - Two British Army captains were captured and arrested while off duty by an IRA patrol in Derry's Bogside area. The two officers were interrogated and released unharmed 18 hours later. The British Army set up a board of inquiry on the issue.
- 14 April 1974 – Captain Anthony Pollen of the Special Reconnaissance Unit was shot dead by the IRA in Derry while carrying out undercover surveillance on a demonstration in the Bogside area.
- 18 December 1975: two British soldiers, Cyril McDonald (aged 43) and Colin McInnes (aged 20), were killed in a bomb attack on the sangar they were manning at the city walls, near Guildhall Square.
- 2 February 1977: Businessman Jeffery Agate was shot and killed outside his house at Talbot Park, while coming back from his work at the DuPont factory in Maydown.
- 28 August 1986: Mervyn Bell, a civilian contractor to the British Army, was shot dead by the IRA while sitting in stationary car outside his father's workplace, council depot, Strand Road, Derry. The IRA rejected claims that the killing was sectarian, stating: "The man's religion is of no interest to us. Despite previous warnings he continued to work for the UDR, and that was the reason he was targeted."
- 8 March 1989: two British soldiers were killed and six others badly wounded when their vehicle struck a massive IRA landmine on the Buncrana Road in Derry. The second vehicle in the patrol was completely destroyed.
- 28 January 1990: a civilian (Charles Love) was killed when he was hit by debris when an IRA bomb exploded on Derry's walls during a march to commemorate Bloody Sunday. The security forces described his death as a "freak accident" as he was a quarter of a mile from the bomb, which was targeting security forces. Love was a member of Republican Youth. He is commemorated at a Sinn Féin-organised march in his home town of Strabane each year.
- 24 October 1990: in a proxy bomb attack, the IRA forced a British Army civilian employee (Patrick Gillespie), by holding his family hostage, to deliver a bomb to a British Army checkpoint at Buncrana Road, Coshquin, County Londonderry (on the County Donegal border). The bomb detonated, killing Gillespie and six British soldiers. As the bomb exploded an IRA unit opened fire from across the border. The military facility was wrecked and several armoured vehicles destroyed by the huge blast. Over 25 houses in a nearby estate were damaged by the bomb.
- 29 June 1991: high ranking Ulster Defence Association commander Cecil McKnight was shot dead by IRA volunteers in the Waterside area of Derry. The IRA claimed he had been involved in the assassination of Sinn Féin councillor Eddie Fullerton. The IRA unit were pursued by the RUC after the shooting but escaped after they opened fire on an RUC patrol car.
- 23 January 1993: an RUC officer was shot and killed while on a foot patrol at Shipquay Street, Derry.
- 14 December 1993: two soldiers were wounded by a trip wire bomb blast in a fence at a railway bordering Ebrington Barracks in Waterside, Derry.
- 19 December 1993: an IRA landmine attack on a British mobile patrol at Buncrana Road, Derry using a 500 lb (230 kg) bomb left four civilians in a passing car - one adult and three young children - in need of hospital treatment. A suspect was arrested at his home eight hours later, where traces of Semtex were found. Damages were estimated at £450,000.
- 20 April 1994: an RUC officer was killed when the IRA fired a horizontal mortar at a British Army/RUC mobile patrol in the Waterside area of Derry. Several other RUC officers were injured.
- 23 May 1994: an IRA team used a motor boat stolen from Foyle Search and Rescue to cross Lough Foyle and plant an explosive device on the jetty of the British Army base at Fort George. Two British soldiers were wounded. One of them was permanently blinded by the blast.
- 11 June 1997: an undercover British Army unit on a stationary van received small arms fire from IRA volunteers riding on another van on Foyle Road in Derry. An intensive search recovered the attackers' van at Glendara Park but failed to round up any suspects. No injuries were reported, but 30 families were evacuated from the area as army technical experts performed forensic examinations on the abandoned vehicle.

== See also ==
- Provisional Irish Republican Army campaign 1969–1997
- Provisional IRA South Armagh Brigade
- Provisional IRA East Tyrone Brigade
- Provisional IRA Belfast Brigade
