= Volunteer (Irish republican) =

Paramilitary member

A volunteer is a member of various Irish republican paramilitary organisations. Among these have been the various forms of the Irish Republican Army (IRA), the Irish National Liberation Army (INLA), and the Irish People's Liberation Organization (IPLO). Óglach is the equivalent title in the Irish language.

== Background ==
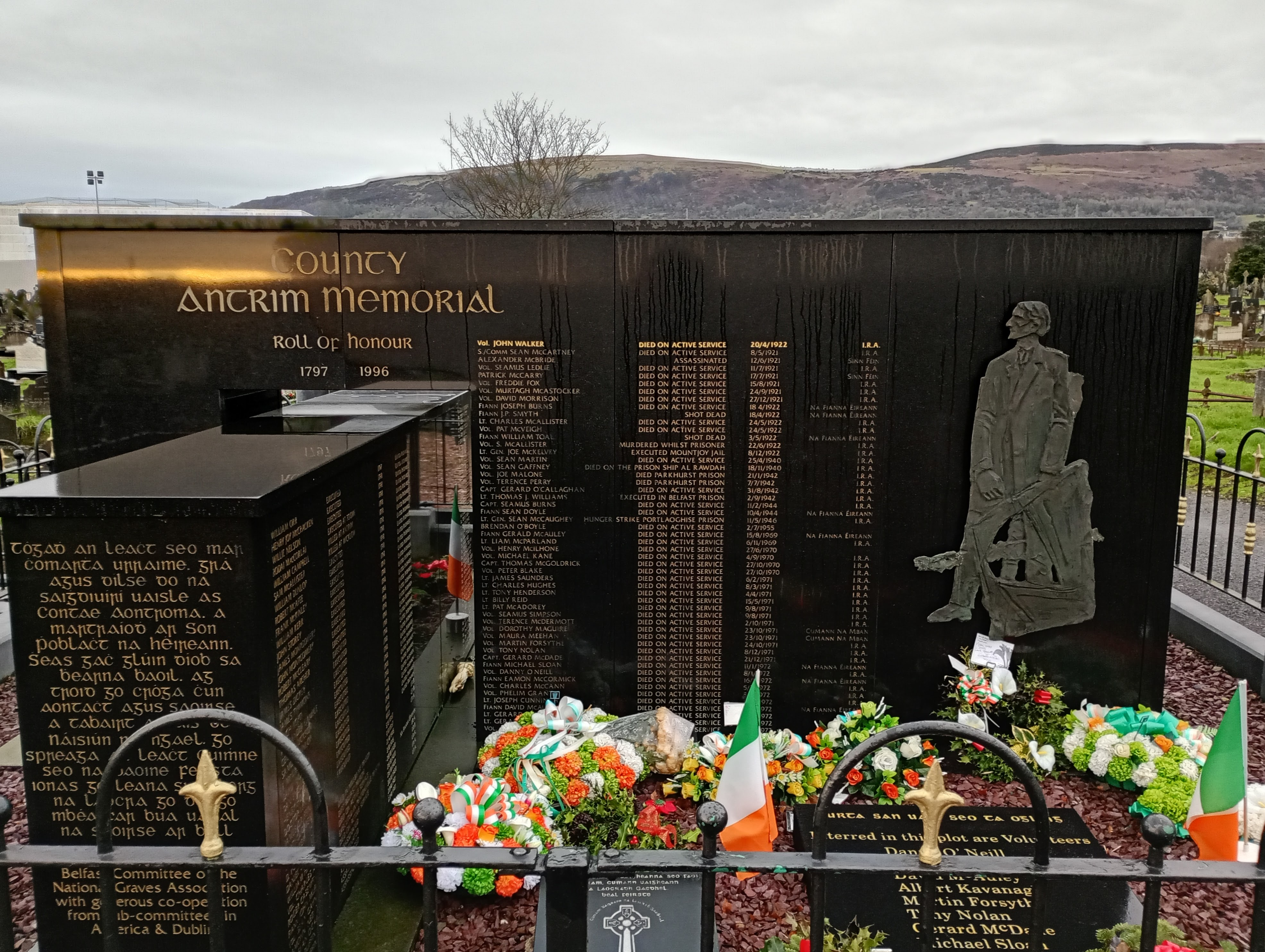
The County Antrim memorial at Milltown Cemetery, Belfast

The Irish Volunteers were formed in 1913, in reaction to the formation of the Ulster Volunteer Force earlier that year, to protect the interests of Irish nationalists during the Home Rule Crisis. The Volunteers took part in the 1916 Easter Rising and—as the Irish Republican Army (IRA)—in the Irish War of Independence. The title "Volunteer" or "Vol." was used for members of the Volunteers who were involved in the 1916 Rising, and in the War of Independence. A number of witness statements given to the Bureau of Military History make frequent use of "Volunteer" as a title for members of the Volunteers and IRA during that period. The County Antrim Memorial in Milltown Cemetery in Belfast lists IRA members who died at various times between 1916 and the period of the Troubles in the late 20th century. "Volunteer" is used for those members who were not officers.

== Use ==
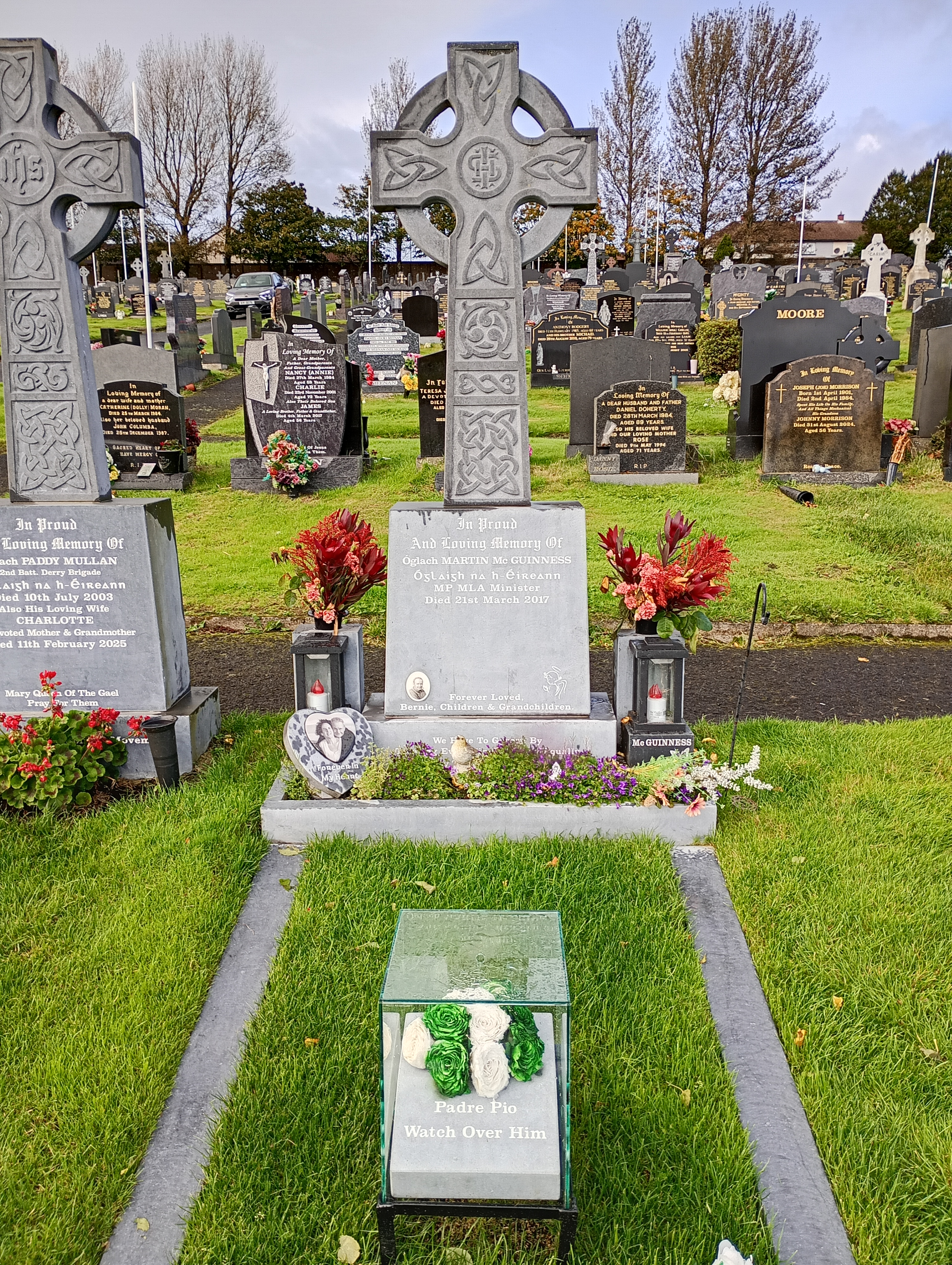
The grave of Martin McGuinness in Derry City Cemetery describes him as "Óglach Martin McGuinness"

The term volunteer can refer to any member of an Irish republican paramilitary organisation, to a "rank and file" member, similar to a private, or to a member that is not a senior officer such as Chief of Staff or Quartermaster General. Joe McCann, an Official IRA member killed in 1972, was referred to in commemorations as a "Staff Captain" but also as a "Volunteer". On the other hand, Joe Cahill, the commander of the Provisional IRA Belfast Brigade in 1971, said in a press conference after the introduction of internment that year, that British forces had only succeeded in arresting two officers of the Provisional IRA. "The rest are volunteers, or as they say in the British Army, privates". The 'v' in "volunteer" may or may not be capitalized.

Most modern IRA memorials refer to the dead only as "Volunteer", "Vol." or "Óglach" rather than giving a specific rank.

The grave of Martin McGuinness, who was adjutant (second in command) of the Derry Brigade of the IRA in the early 1970s and who subsequently became deputy First Minister in the Northern Ireland Executive, a post he held until just before his death in 2017, calls him "Óglach Martin McGuinness".

== See also ==
- Volunteer (Ulster loyalist)
