= Provisional Irish Republican Army =

Paramilitary force active from 1969 to 2005

- Irish: Óglaigh na hÉireann
- A Provisional IRA badge, with the phoenix symbolising the group's origins.
- Leader: IRA Army Council
- Dates active: 1969–2005 (on ceasefire from 1997)
- Allegiance: Irish Republic (Note: The Provisional IRA rejected the legitimacy of the Republic of Ireland, instead claiming its Army Council to be the provisional government of the revolutionary Irish Republic.)
- Active regions: Ireland, England, Europe
- Ideology: Irish republicanism; Irish republican legitimism; Socialism
- Size: est. 10,000 throughout the Troubles
- Wars: The Troubles

The Provisional Irish Republican Army (Provisional IRA), officially known as the Irish Republican Army (IRA; Irish: Óglaigh na hÉireann) and informally known as the Provos, was an Irish republican paramilitary force that sought to end British rule in Northern Ireland, facilitate Irish reunification and bring about an independent socialist republic, which would encompass all of Ireland. It was the most active republican paramilitary group during the Troubles. It argued that the all-island Irish Republic continued to exist, and it saw itself as that state's army, the sole legitimate successor to the original IRA from the Irish War of Independence. It was designated a terrorist organisation in the United Kingdom and an unlawful organisation in the Republic of Ireland, both of whose authority it rejected.

The Provisional IRA emerged in December 1969, due to a split within the previous incarnation of the IRA and the broader Irish republican movement. It was initially the minority faction in the split compared to the Official IRA but became the dominant faction by 1972. The Troubles had begun shortly before when a largely Catholic, nonviolent civil rights campaign was met with violence from both Ulster loyalists and the Royal Ulster Constabulary (RUC), culminating in the August 1969 riots and deployment of British soldiers.

The IRA initially focused on defence of Catholic areas, but it began an offensive campaign in 1970 that was aided by external sources, including Irish diaspora communities within the Anglosphere, and the Palestine Liberation Organization and Libyan leader Muammar Gaddafi. It used guerrilla tactics against the British Army and RUC in both rural and urban areas, and carried out a bombing campaign in Northern Ireland and England against military, political and economic targets, and British military targets in mainland Europe. They also targeted civilian contractors to the British security forces. The IRA's armed campaign, primarily in Northern Ireland but also in England and mainland Europe, killed over 1,700 people, including roughly 1,000 members of the British security forces and 500–644 civilians.

The Provisional IRA declared a final ceasefire in July 1997, after which its political wing Sinn Féin was admitted into multi-party peace talks on the future of Northern Ireland. These resulted in the 1998 Good Friday Agreement. In 2005, the IRA formally ended its armed campaign and decommissioned its weapons under the supervision of the Independent International Commission on Decommissioning. Several splinter groups have been formed as a result of splits within the IRA, including the Continuity IRA, which is still active in the dissident Irish republican campaign, and the Real IRA.

== History ==
=== Origins ===
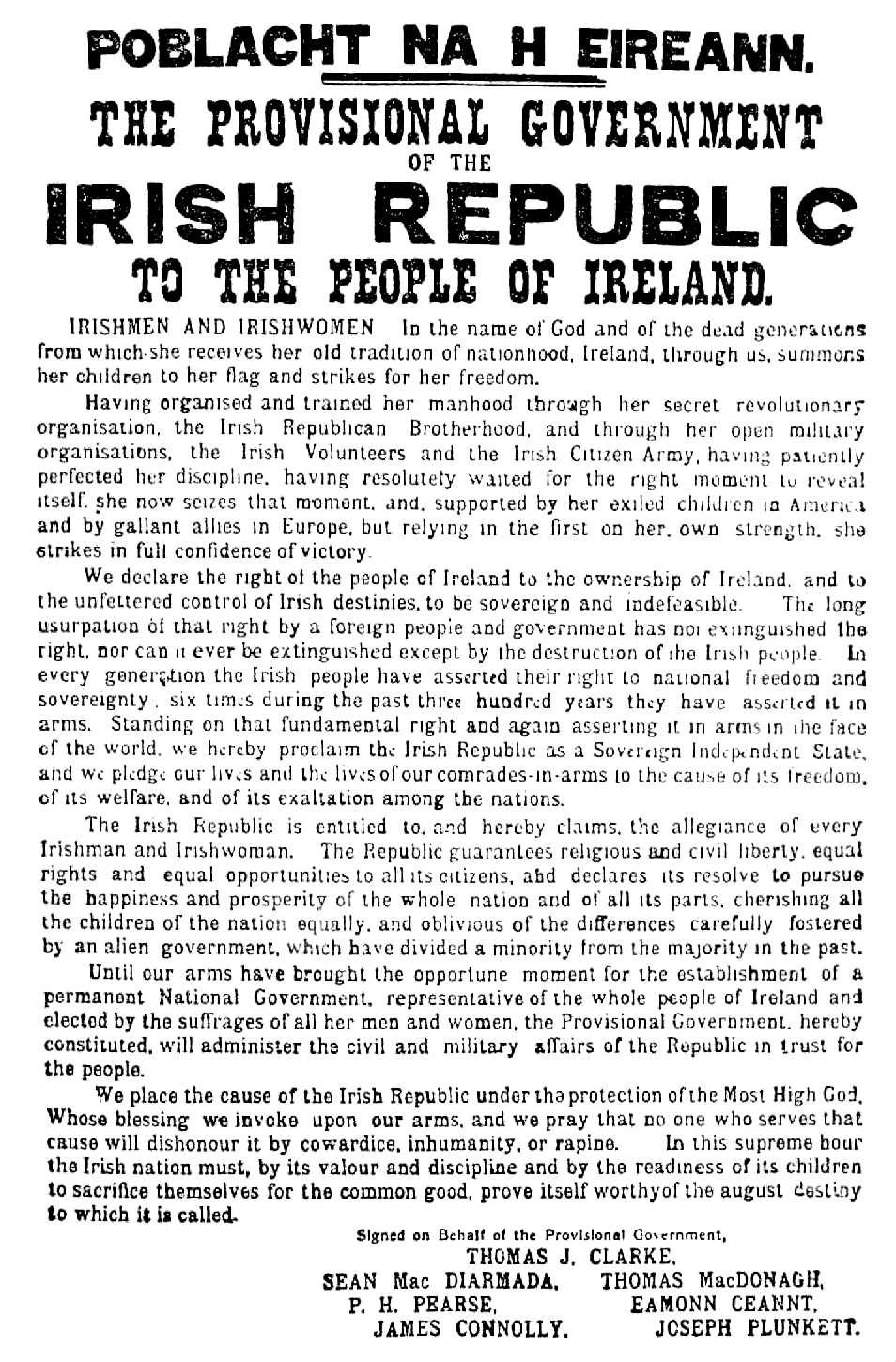
The Proclamation of the Irish Republic, issued during the 1916 Easter Rising against British rule in Ireland

The original IRA was formed in 1913 as the Irish Volunteers, at a time when all of Ireland was part of the United Kingdom. The Volunteers took part in the Easter Rising against British rule in 1916, and the War of Independence that followed the Declaration of Independence by the revolutionary parliament Dáil Éireann in 1919, during which they came to be known as the IRA. Ireland was partitioned into Southern Ireland and Northern Ireland by the Government of Ireland Act 1920, and following the implementation of the Anglo-Irish Treaty in 1922 Southern Ireland, renamed the Irish Free State, became a self-governing dominion while Northern Ireland chose to remain under home rule as part of the United Kingdom. (Note: The Irish Free State subsequently changed its name to Ireland and in 1949 became a sovereign state fully independent of the United Kingdom.) The Treaty caused a split in the IRA, and the pro-Treaty IRA were absorbed into the National Army, which defeated the anti-Treaty IRA in the Civil War. Subsequently, while denying the legitimacy of the Free State, the surviving elements of the anti-Treaty IRA focused on overthrowing the Northern Ireland state and the achievement of a united Ireland, carrying out a bombing campaign in England in 1939 and 1940, a campaign in Northern Ireland in the 1940s, and the Border campaign of 1956–1962. Following the failure of the Border campaign, internal debate took place regarding the future of the IRA. Chief-of-staff Cathal Goulding wanted the IRA to adopt a socialist agenda and become involved in politics, while traditional republicans such as Seán Mac Stíofáin wanted to increase recruitment and rebuild the IRA.

Following partition, Northern Ireland became a de facto one-party state governed by the Ulster Unionist Party in the Parliament of Northern Ireland, in which Catholics were viewed as second-class citizens. Protestants were given preference in jobs and housing, and local government constituencies were gerrymandered in places such as Derry. Policing was carried out by the armed Royal Ulster Constabulary (RUC) and the B-Specials, both of which were almost exclusively Protestant. In the mid-1960s tension between the Catholic and Protestant communities was increasing. In 1966 Ireland celebrated the 50th anniversary of the Easter Rising, prompting fears of a renewed IRA campaign. Feeling under threat, Protestants formed the Ulster Volunteer Force (UVF), a paramilitary group which killed three people in May 1966, two of them Catholic men. In January 1967 the Northern Ireland Civil Rights Association (NICRA) was formed by a diverse group of people, including IRA members and liberal unionists. Civil rights marches by NICRA and a similar organisation, People's Democracy, protesting against discrimination were met by counter-protests and violent clashes with loyalists, including the Ulster Protestant Volunteers, a paramilitary group led by Ian Paisley.

Marches marking the Ulster Protestant celebration The Twelfth in July 1969 led to riots and violent clashes in Belfast, Derry and elsewhere. The following month a three-day riot began in the Catholic Bogside area of Derry, following a march by the Protestant Apprentice Boys of Derry. The Battle of the Bogside caused Catholics in Belfast to riot in solidarity with the Bogsiders and to try to prevent RUC reinforcements being sent to Derry, sparking retaliation by Protestant mobs. The subsequent arson attacks, damage to property and intimidation forced 1,505 Catholic families and 315 Protestant families to leave their homes in Belfast in the Northern Ireland riots of August 1969. The riots resulted in 275 buildings being destroyed or requiring major repairs, 83.5% of them occupied by Catholics. A number of people were killed on both sides, some by the police, and the British Army were deployed to Northern Ireland. The IRA had been poorly armed and failed to properly defend Catholic areas from Protestant attacks, which had been considered one of its roles since the 1920s. Veteran republicans were critical of Goulding and the IRA's Dublin leadership which, for political reasons, had refused to prepare for aggressive action in advance of the violence. On 24 August a group including Joe Cahill, Seamus Twomey, Dáithí Ó Conaill, Billy McKee, and Jimmy Steele came together in Belfast and decided to remove the pro-Goulding Belfast leadership of Billy McMillen and Jim Sullivan and return to traditional militant republicanism. On 22 September Twomey, McKee, and Steele were among sixteen armed IRA men who confronted the Belfast leadership over the failure to adequately defend Catholic areas. A compromise was agreed where McMillen stayed in command, but he was not to have any communication with the IRA's Dublin based leadership.

=== 1969 split ===
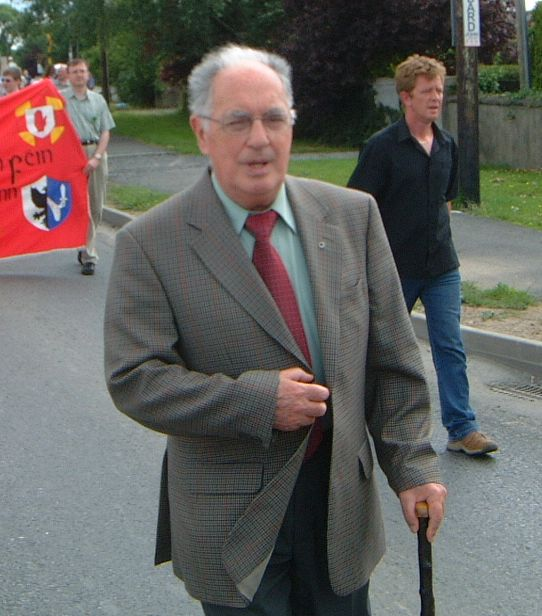
Ruairí Ó Brádaigh, who was twice chief-of-staff of the pre-1969 IRA during the Border campaign of 1956–1962, was a member of the first Army Council of the Provisional IRA in 1969.

The IRA split into "Provisional" and "Official" factions in December 1969, after an IRA convention was held in Boyle, County Roscommon, Republic of Ireland. The two main issues at the convention were a resolution to enter into a "National Liberation Front" with radical left-wing groups, and a resolution to end abstentionism, which would allow participation in the British, Irish, and Northern Ireland parliaments. Traditional republicans refused to vote on the "National Liberation Front", and it was passed by twenty-nine votes to seven. The traditionalists argued strongly against the ending of abstentionism, and the official minutes report the resolution passed by twenty-seven votes to twelve. (Note: The vote was a show of hands and the result is disputed. It has been variously reported as twenty-eight votes to twelve, or thirty-nine votes to twelve. The official minutes state out of the forty-six delegates scheduled to attend, thirty-nine were in attendance, and the result of the second vote was twenty-seven votes to twelve.)

Following the convention the traditionalists canvassed support throughout Ireland, with IRA director of intelligence Mac Stíofáin meeting the disaffected members of the IRA in Belfast. Shortly after, the traditionalists held a convention which elected a "Provisional" Army Council, composed of Mac Stíofáin, Ruairí Ó Brádaigh, Paddy Mulcahy, Sean Tracey, Leo Martin, Ó Conaill, and Cahill. The term provisional was chosen to mirror the 1916 Provisional Government of the Irish Republic, and also to designate it as temporary pending ratification by a further IRA convention. (Note: Following a convention in September 1970 the "Provisional" Army Council announced that the provisional period had finished, but the name stuck.) Nine out of thirteen IRA units in Belfast sided with the "Provisional" Army Council in December 1969, roughly 120 activists and 500 supporters. The Provisional IRA issued their first public statement on 28 December 1969, stating:

We declare our allegiance to the 32 county Irish republic, proclaimed at Easter 1916, established by the first Dáil Éireann in 1919, overthrown by force of arms in 1922 and suppressed to this day by the existing British-imposed six-county and twenty-six-county partition states ... We call on the Irish people at home and in exile for increased support towards defending our people in the North and the eventual achievement of the full political, social, economic and cultural freedom of Ireland. (Note: The Provisional IRA issued all its public statements under the pseudonym "P. O'Neill" of the "Irish Republican Publicity Bureau, Dublin". Dáithí Ó Conaill, the IRA's director of publicity, came up with the name. According to Danny Morrison, the pseudonym "S. O'Neill" was used during the 1940s.)

The Irish republican political party Sinn Féin split along the same lines on 11 January 1970 in Dublin, when a third of the delegates walked out of the party's highest deliberative body, the ard fheis, in protest at the party leadership's attempt to force through the ending of abstentionism, despite its failure to achieve a two-thirds majority vote of delegates required to change the policy. (Note: When the resolution failed to achieve the necessary two-thirds majority to change Sinn Féin policy the leadership announced a resolution recognising the "Official" Army Council, which would only require a simple majority vote to pass. At this point Seán Mac Stíofáin led the walkout after declaring allegiance to the "Provisional" Army Council.) The delegates that walked out reconvened at another venue where Mac Stíofáin, Ó Brádaigh and Mulcahy from the "Provisional" Army Council were elected to the Caretaker Executive of "Provisional" Sinn Féin. (Note: The provisional period for "Provisional" Sinn Féin ended at an ard fheis in October 1970, when the Caretaker Executive was dissolved and an Ard Chomhairle was elected, with Ruairí Ó Brádaigh becoming president of Sinn Féin. Tomás Mac Giolla, president of the pre-split Sinn Féin since 1962, continued as president of Official Sinn Féin.) Despite the declared support of that faction of Sinn Féin, the early Provisional IRA avoided political activity, instead relying on physical force republicanism. £100,000 was donated by the Fianna Fáil-led Irish government in 1969 to the Central Citizens Defence Committee in Catholic areas, some of which ended up in the hands of the IRA. This resulted in the 1970 Arms Crisis where criminal charges were pursued against two former government ministers and others including John Kelly, an IRA volunteer from Belfast. The Provisional IRA maintained the principles of the pre-1969 IRA, considering both British rule in Northern Ireland and the government of the Republic of Ireland to be illegitimate, and the Army Council to be the provisional government of the all-island Irish Republic. This belief was based on a series of perceived political inheritances which constructed a legal continuity from the Second Dáil of 1921–1922. The IRA recruited many young nationalists from Northern Ireland who had not been involved in the IRA before, but had been radicalised by the violence that broke out in 1969. These people became known as "sixty niners", having joined after 1969. (Note: The IRA also used "forties men" for volunteers such as Joe Cahill who fought in the Northern campaign, and "fifties men" for volunteers who fought in the Border campaign.) The IRA adopted the phoenix as the symbol of the Irish republican rebirth in 1969, one of its slogans was "out of the ashes rose the Provisionals", representing the IRA's resurrection from the ashes of burnt-out Catholic areas of Belfast.

=== Initial phase ===
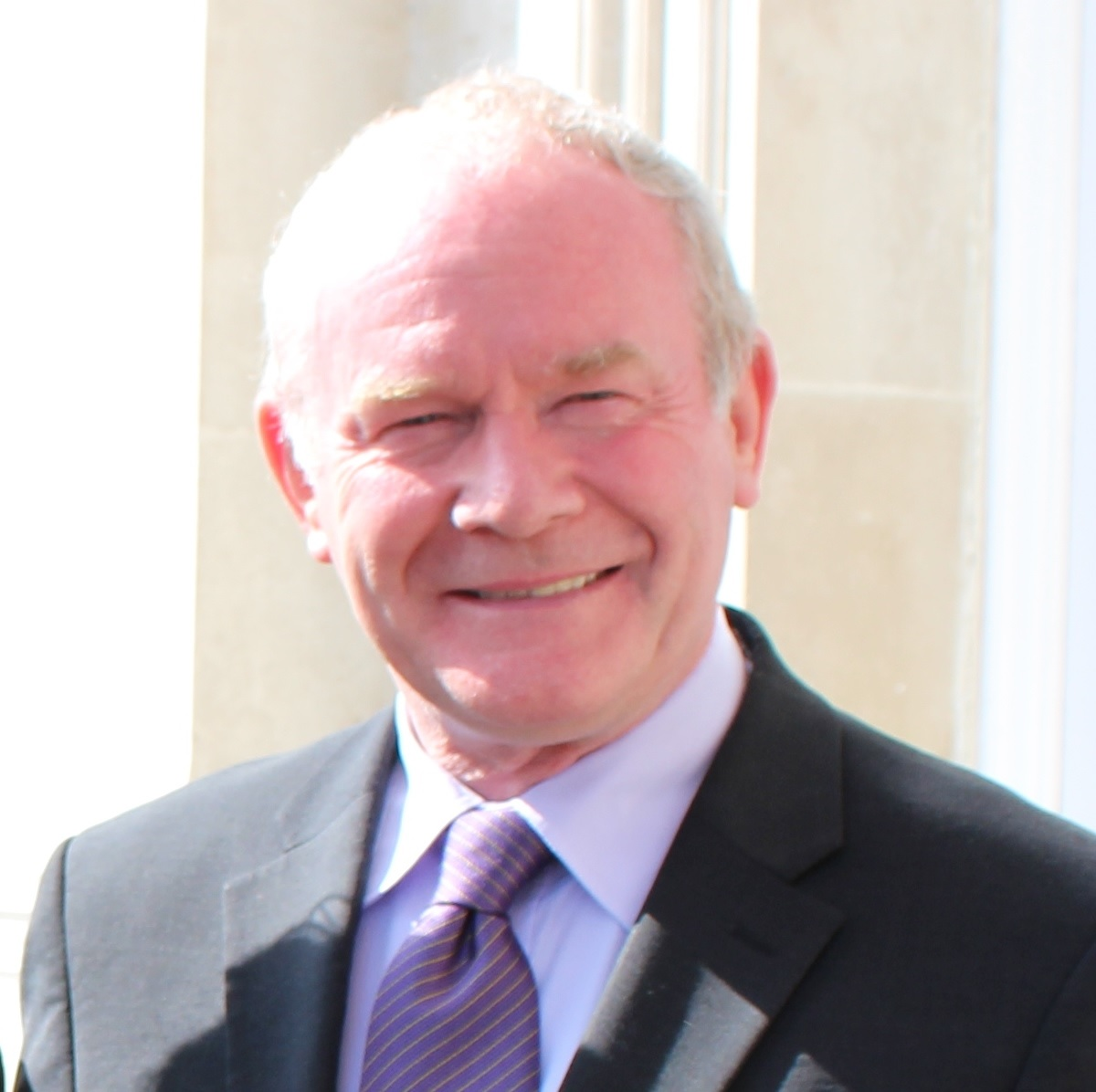
Martin McGuinness was part of an IRA delegation which took part in peace talks with British politician William Whitelaw, the Secretary of State for Northern Ireland, in July 1972.

In January 1970, the Army Council decided to adopt a three-stage strategy; defence of nationalist areas, followed by a combination of defence and retaliation, and finally launching a guerrilla campaign against the British Army. The Official IRA was opposed to such a campaign because they felt it would lead to sectarian conflict, which would defeat their strategy of uniting the workers from both sides of the sectarian divide. The Provisional IRA's strategy was to use force to cause the collapse of the Northern Ireland government and to inflict such heavy casualties on the British Army that the British government would be forced by public opinion to withdraw from Ireland. Mac Stíofáin decided they would "escalate, escalate and escalate", in what the British Army would later describe as a "classic insurgency". In October 1970 the IRA began a bombing campaign against economic targets; by the end of the year there had been 153 explosions. The following year it was responsible for the vast majority of the 1,000 explosions that occurred in Northern Ireland. The strategic aim behind the bombings was to target businesses and commercial premises to deter investment and force the British government to pay compensation, increasing the financial cost of keeping Northern Ireland within the United Kingdom. (Note: In the early 1970s insurance companies cancelled cover for damage caused by bombs in Northern Ireland, so the British government paid compensation.) The IRA also believed that the bombing campaign would tie down British soldiers in static positions guarding potential targets, preventing their deployment in counter-insurgency operations. Loyalist paramilitaries, including the UVF, carried out campaigns aimed at thwarting the IRA's aspirations and maintaining the political union with Britain. Loyalist paramilitaries tended to target Catholics with no connection to the republican movement, seeking to undermine support for the IRA. (Note: This was due to the difficulty in identifying members of the IRA, ease of targeting, and many loyalists believing ordinary Catholics were in league with the IRA.)

As a result of escalating violence, internment without trial was introduced by the Northern Ireland government on 9 August 1971, with 342 suspects arrested in the first twenty-four hours. Despite loyalist violence also increasing, all of those arrested were republicans, including political activists not associated with the IRA and student civil rights leaders. The one-sided nature of internment united all Catholics in opposition to the government, and riots broke out in protest across Northern Ireland. Twenty-two people were killed in the next three days, including six civilians killed by the British Army as part of the Ballymurphy massacre on 9 August, and in Belfast 7,000 Catholics and 2,000 Protestants were forced from their homes by the rioting. The introduction of internment dramatically increased the level of violence. In the seven months prior to internment 34 people had been killed, 140 people were killed between the introduction of internment and the end of the year, including thirty soldiers and eleven RUC officers. Internment boosted IRA recruitment, and in Dublin the Taoiseach, Jack Lynch, abandoned a planned idea to introduce internment in the Republic of Ireland. (Note: Internment had been effective during the IRA's Border campaign of 1956–1962 as it was used on both sides of the Irish border denying the IRA a safe operational base, but due to Lynch cancelling his plans IRA fugitives had a safe haven south of the border due to public sympathy for the IRA's cause. The Republic of Ireland's Extradition Act 1965 contained a political offence exception that prevented IRA members from being extradited to Northern Ireland and numerous extradition requests were rejected before Dominic McGlinchey became the first republican paramilitary to be extradited in 1984.) IRA recruitment further increased after Bloody Sunday in Derry on 30 January 1972, when the British Army killed fourteen unarmed civilians during an anti-internment march. Due to the deteriorating security situation in Northern Ireland the British government suspended the Northern Ireland parliament and imposed direct rule in March 1972. The suspension of the Northern Ireland parliament was a key objective of the IRA, in order to directly involve the British government in Northern Ireland, as the IRA wanted the conflict to be seen as one between Ireland and Britain. In May 1972 the Official IRA called a ceasefire, leaving the Provisional IRA as the sole active republican paramilitary organisation. (Note: In 1974 Seamus Costello, an Official IRA member who led a faction opposed to its ceasefire, was expelled and formed the Irish National Liberation Army. This organisation remained active until 1994 when it began a "no-first-strike" policy, before declaring a ceasefire in 1998. Its armed campaign, which caused the deaths of 113 people, was formally ended in October 2009 and in February 2010 it decommissioned its weapons.) New recruits saw the Official IRA as existing for the purpose of defence in contrast to the Provisional IRA as existing for the purpose of attack, increased recruitment and defections from the Official IRA to the Provisional IRA led to the latter becoming the dominant organisation. (Note: After the Official IRA's ceasefire, the Provisional IRA were typically referred to as simply the IRA.)

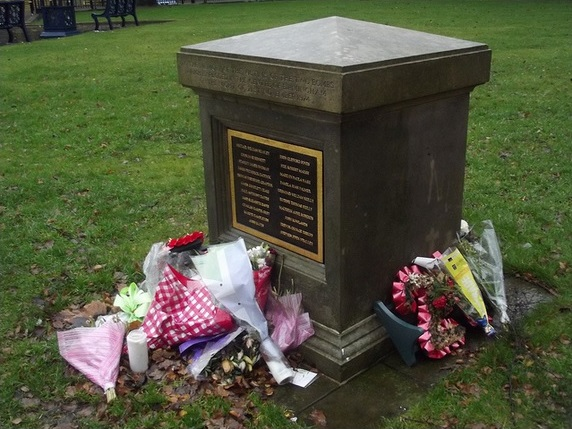
Memorial to the victims of the Birmingham pub bombings, which killed twenty-one people in November 1974

On 22 June the IRA announced that a ceasefire would begin at midnight on 26 June, in anticipation of talks with the British government. Two days later Ó Brádaigh and Ó Conaill held a press conference in Dublin to announce the Éire Nua (New Ireland) policy, which advocated an all-Ireland federal republic, with devolved governments and parliaments for each of the four historic provinces of Ireland. (Note: The Army Council withdrew its support for Éire Nua in 1979. It remained Sinn Féin policy until 1982.) This was designed to deal with the fears of unionists over a united Ireland, an Ulster parliament with a narrow Protestant majority would provide them with protection for their interests. The British government held secret talks with the republican leadership on 7 July, with Mac Stíofáin, Ó Conaill, Ivor Bell, Twomey, Gerry Adams, and Martin McGuinness flying to England to meet a British delegation led by William Whitelaw. Mac Stíofáin made demands including British withdrawal, removal of the British Army from sensitive areas, and a release of republican prisoners and an amnesty for fugitives. The British refused and the talks broke up, and the IRA's ceasefire ended on 9 July. In late 1972 and early 1973 the IRA's leadership was being depleted by arrests on both sides of the Irish border, with Mac Stíofáin, Ó Brádaigh and McGuinness all imprisoned for IRA membership. Due to the crisis the IRA bombed London in March 1973, as the Army Council believed bombs in England would have a greater impact on British public opinion. This was followed by an intense period of IRA activity in England that left forty-five people dead by the end of 1974, including twenty-one civilians killed in the Birmingham pub bombings.

Following an IRA ceasefire over the Christmas period in 1974 and a further one in January 1975, on 8 February the IRA issued a statement suspending "offensive military action" from six o'clock the following day. A series of meetings took place between the IRA's leadership and British government representatives throughout the year, with the IRA being led to believe this was the start of a process of British withdrawal. Occasional IRA violence occurred during the ceasefire, with bombs in Belfast, Derry, and South Armagh. The IRA was also involved in tit for tat sectarian killings of Protestant civilians, in retaliation for sectarian killings by loyalist paramilitaries. By July the Army Council was concerned at the progress of the talks, concluding there was no prospect of a lasting peace without a public declaration by the British government of their intent to withdraw from Ireland. In August there was a gradual return to the armed campaign, and the truce effectively ended on 22 September when the IRA set off 22 bombs across Northern Ireland. The old guard leadership of Ó Brádaigh, Ó Conaill, and McKee were criticised by a younger generation of activists following the ceasefire, and their influence in the IRA slowly declined. The younger generation viewed the ceasefire as being disastrous for the IRA, causing the organisation irreparable damage and taking it close to being defeated. The Army Council was accused of falling into a trap that allowed the British breathing space and time to build up intelligence on the IRA, and McKee was criticised for allowing the IRA to become involved in sectarian killings, as well a feud with the Official IRA in October and November 1975 that left eleven people dead.

=== The "Long War" ===
An IRA political poster from the 1980s, featuring a quote from Bobby Sands written on the first day of the 1981 hunger strike

Following the end of the ceasefire, the British government introduced a new three-part strategy to deal with the Troubles; the parts became known as Ulsterisation, normalisation, and criminalisation. Ulsterisation involved increasing the role of the locally recruited RUC and Ulster Defence Regiment (UDR), a part-time element of the British Army, in order to try to contain the conflict inside Northern Ireland and reduce the number of British soldiers recruited from outside of Northern Ireland being killed.

Normalisation involved the ending of internment without trial and Special Category Status, the latter had been introduced in 1972 following a hunger strike led by McKee. Criminalisation was designed to alter public perception of the Troubles, from an insurgency requiring a military solution to a criminal problem requiring a law enforcement solution. As result of the withdrawal of Special Category Status, in September 1976 IRA prisoner Kieran Nugent began the blanket protest in the Maze Prison, when hundreds of prisoners refused to wear prison uniforms.

In 1977 the IRA evolved a new strategy which they called the "Long War", which would remain their strategy for the rest of the Troubles. This strategy accepted that their campaign would last many years before being successful, and included increased emphasis on political activity through Sinn Féin. A republican document of the early 1980s states "Both Sinn Féin and the IRA play different but converging roles in the war of national liberation. The Irish Republican Army wages an armed campaign ... Sinn Féin maintains the propaganda war and is the public and political voice of the movement". The 1977 edition of the Green Book, an induction and training manual used by the IRA, describes the strategy of the "Long War" in these terms:

1. A war of attrition against enemy personnel [British Army] which is aimed at causing as many casualties and deaths as possible so as to create a demand from their [the British] people at home for their withdrawal.
2. A bombing campaign aimed at making the enemy's financial interests in our country unprofitable while at the same time curbing long-term investment in our country.
3. To make the Six Counties ... ungovernable except by colonial military rule.
4. To sustain the war and gain support for its ends by National and International propaganda and publicity campaigns.
5. By defending the war of liberation by punishing criminals, collaborators and informers.

The "Long War" saw the IRA's tactics move away from the large bombing campaigns of the early 1970s, in favour of more attacks on members of the security forces. The IRA's new multi-faceted strategy saw them begin to use armed propaganda, using the publicity gained from attacks such as the assassination of Lord Mountbatten and the Warrenpoint ambush to focus attention on the nationalist community's rejection of British rule. The IRA aimed to keep Northern Ireland unstable, which would frustrate the British objective of installing a power sharing government as a solution to the Troubles.

The prison protest against criminalisation culminated in the 1981 Irish hunger strike, when seven IRA and three Irish National Liberation Army members starved themselves to death in pursuit of political status. The hunger strike leader Bobby Sands and Anti H-Block activist Owen Carron were successively elected to the British House of Commons, and two other protesting prisoners were elected to Dáil Éireann. The electoral successes led to the IRA's armed campaign being pursued in parallel with increased electoral participation by Sinn Féin. This strategy was known as the "Armalite and ballot box strategy", named after Danny Morrison's speech at the 1981 Sinn Féin ard fheis:

Who here really believes that we can win the war through the ballot box? But will anyone here object if with a ballot paper in this hand and an Armalite in this hand we take power in Ireland?

Attacks on high-profile political and military targets remained a priority for the IRA. The Chelsea Barracks bombing in London in October 1981 killed two civilians and injured twenty-three soldiers; a week later the IRA struck again in London with an assassination attempt on Lieutenant General Steuart Pringle, the Commandant General Royal Marines. Attacks on military targets in England continued with the Hyde Park and Regent's Park bombings in July 1982, which killed eleven soldiers and injured over fifty people including civilians.

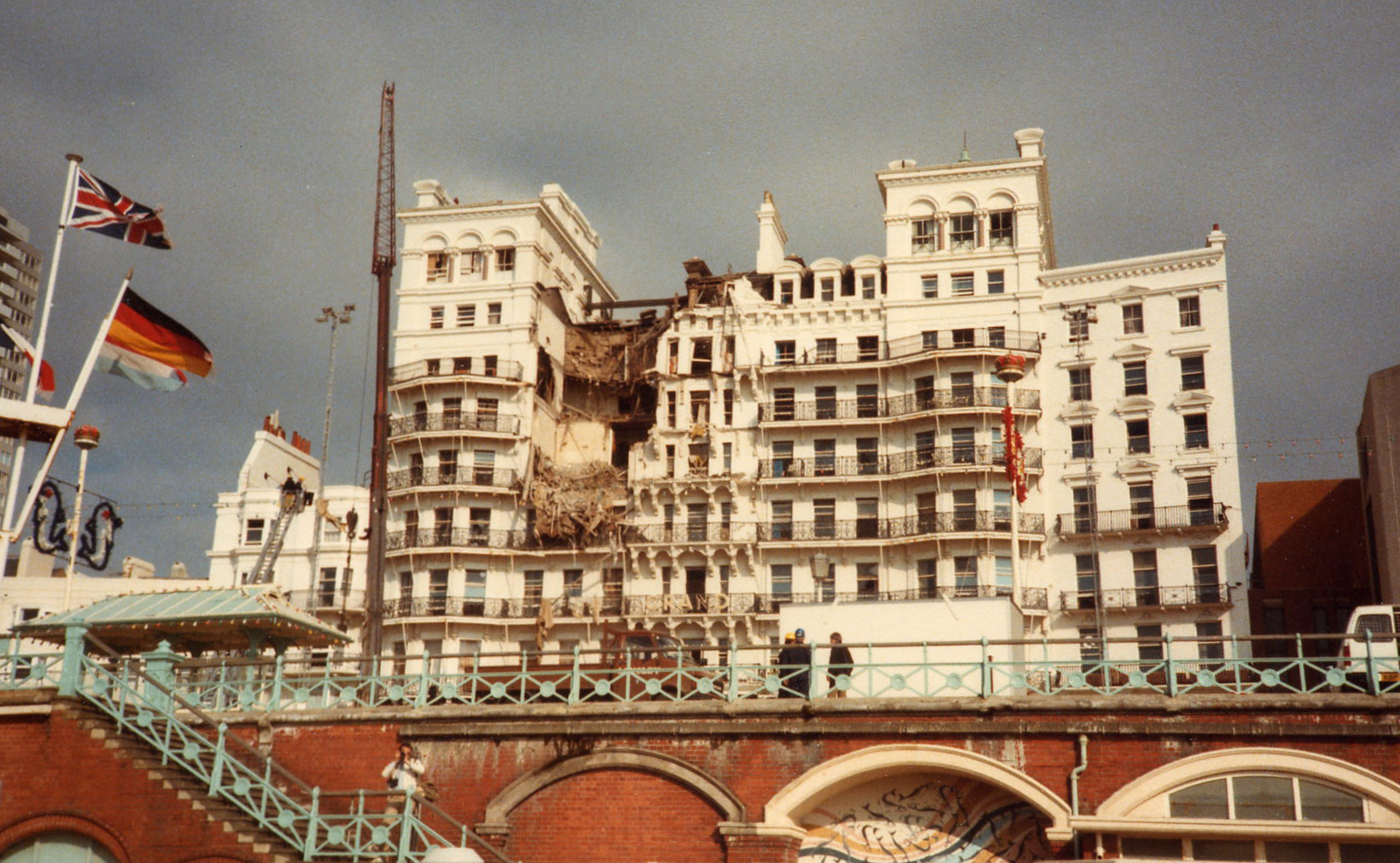
The aftermath of the Brighton hotel bombing, an assassination attempt on British prime minister Margaret Thatcher in 1984

In October 1984, they carried out the Brighton hotel bombing, an assassination attempt on British prime minister Margaret Thatcher, whom they blamed for the deaths of the ten hunger strikers. The bombing killed five members of the Conservative Party attending a party conference including MP Anthony Berry, with Thatcher narrowly escaping death. A planned escalation of the England bombing campaign in 1985 was prevented when six IRA volunteers, including Martina Anderson and the Brighton bomber Patrick Magee, were arrested in Glasgow. Plans for a major escalation of the campaign in the late 1980s were cancelled after a ship carrying 150 tonnes of weapons donated by Libya was seized off the coast of France. The plans, modelled on the Tet Offensive during the Vietnam War, relied on the element of surprise, which was lost when the ship's captain informed French authorities of four earlier shipments of weapons, which allowed the British Army to deploy appropriate countermeasures. In 1987 the IRA began attacking British military targets in mainland Europe, beginning with the Rheindahlen bombing, which was followed by approximately twenty other gun and bomb attacks aimed at British Armed Forces personnel and bases between 1988 and 1990.

=== Peace process ===
By the late 1980s, the Troubles were at a military and political stalemate, with the IRA able to prevent the British government imposing a settlement but unable to force their objective of Irish reunification. Sinn Féin president Adams was in contact with Social Democratic and Labour Party (SDLP) leader John Hume and a delegation representing the Irish government, in order to find political alternatives to the IRA's campaign. As a result of the republican leadership appearing interested in peace, British policy shifted when Peter Brooke, the Secretary of State for Northern Ireland, began to engage with them hoping for a political settlement. Backchannel diplomacy between the IRA and British government began in October 1990, with Sinn Féin being given an advance copy of a planned speech by Brooke. The speech was given in London the following month, with Brooke stating that the British government would not give in to violence but offering significant political change if violence stopped, ending his statement by saying:

The British government has no selfish, strategic or economic interest in Northern Ireland: Our role is to help, enable and encourage ... Partition is an acknowledgement of reality, not an assertion of national self-interest. (Note: Brooke's speech is known as the Whitbread Speech as it was given at the Whitbread Restaurant in London, in front of the British Association of Canned Food Importers & Distributors. It is regarded as a key moment in the Northern Ireland peace process.)

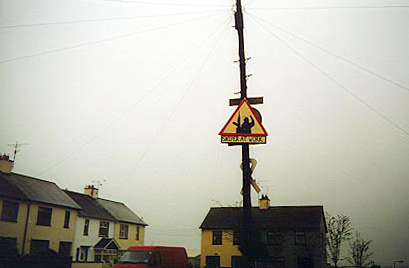
A "Sniper at Work" sign in Crossmaglen. The IRA's South Armagh Brigade killed seven members of the security forces in single-shot sniper attacks in 1993.

The IRA responded to Brooke's speech by declaring a three-day ceasefire over Christmas, the first in fifteen years. Afterwards the IRA intensified the bombing campaign in England, planting 36 bombs in 1991 and 57 in 1992, up from 15 in 1990. The Baltic Exchange bombing in April 1992 killed three people and caused an estimated £800 million worth of damage, £200 million more than the total damage caused by the Troubles in Northern Ireland up to that point. In December 1992 Patrick Mayhew, who had succeeded Brooke as Secretary of State for Northern Ireland, gave a speech directed at the IRA in Coleraine, stating that while Irish reunification could be achieved by negotiation, the British government would not give in to violence. The secret talks between the British government and the IRA via intermediaries continued, with the British government arguing the IRA would be more likely to achieve its objective through politics than continued violence. (Note: Denis Bradley and Brendan Duddy were used as intermediaries. The intermediary would receive messages from a British government representative either face-to-face or by using a safe telephone or fax machine, and would forward the messages to the IRA leadership.) The talks progressed slowly due to continued IRA violence, including the Warrington bombing in March 1993 which killed two children and the Bishopsgate bombing a month later which killed one person and caused an estimated £1 billion worth of damage. In December 1993 a press conference was held at London's Downing Street by British prime minister John Major and the Irish Taoiseach Albert Reynolds. They delivered the Downing Street Declaration which conceded the right of Irish people to self-determination, but with separate referendums in Northern Ireland and the Republic of Ireland. In January 1994 The Army Council voted to reject the declaration, while Sinn Féin asked the British government to clarify certain aspects of the declaration. The British government replied saying the declaration spoke for itself, and refused to meet with Sinn Féin unless the IRA called a ceasefire.

On 31 August 1994, the IRA announced a "complete cessation of military operations" on the understanding that Sinn Féin would be included in political talks for a settlement. A new strategy known as "TUAS" was revealed to the IRA's rank-and-file following the ceasefire, described as either "Tactical Use of Armed Struggle" to the Irish republican movement or "Totally Unarmed Strategy" to the broader Irish nationalist movement. The strategy involved a coalition including Sinn Féin, the SDLP and the Irish government acting in concert to apply leverage to the British government, with the IRA's armed campaign starting and stopping as necessary, and an option to call off the ceasefire if negotiations failed. The British government refused to admit Sinn Féin to multi-party talks before the IRA decommissioned its weapons, and a standoff began as the IRA refused to disarm before a final peace settlement had been agreed. The IRA regarded themselves as being undefeated and decommissioning as an act of surrender, and stated decommissioning had never been mentioned prior to the ceasefire being declared. In March 1995 Mayhew set out three conditions for Sinn Féin being admitted to multi-party talks. Firstly the IRA had to be willing to agree to "disarm progressively", secondly a scheme for decommissioning had to be agreed, and finally some weapons had to be decommissioned prior to the talks beginning as a confidence building measure. The IRA responded with public statements in September calling decommissioning an "unreasonable demand" and a "stalling tactic" by the British government.

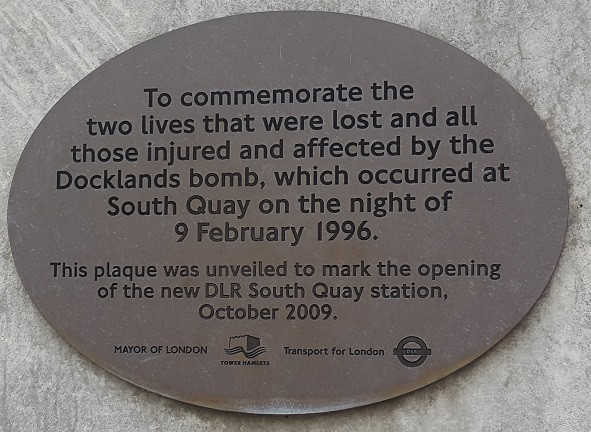
Memorial to the victims of the 1996 Docklands bombing, which killed two people and ended the IRA's seventeen-month ceasefire

On 9 February 1996 a statement from the Army Council was delivered to the Irish national broadcaster Raidió Teilifís Éireann announcing the end of the ceasefire, and just over 90 minutes later the Docklands bombing killed two people and caused an estimated £100–150 million damage to some of London's more expensive commercial property. Three weeks later the British and Irish governments issued a joint statement announcing multi-party talks would begin on 10 June, with Sinn Féin excluded unless the IRA called a new ceasefire. The IRA's campaign continued with the Manchester bombing on 15 June, which injured over 200 people and caused an estimated £400 million of damage to the city centre. Attacks were mostly in England apart from the Osnabrück mortar attack on a British Army base in Germany. The IRA's first attack in Northern Ireland since the end of the ceasefire was not until October 1996, when the Thiepval barracks bombing killed a British soldier. In February 1997 an IRA sniper team killed Lance Bombardier Stephen Restorick, the last British soldier to be killed by the IRA.

Following the May 1997 UK general election Major was replaced as prime minister by Tony Blair of the Labour Party. The new Secretary of State for Northern Ireland, Mo Mowlam, had announced prior to the election she would be willing to include Sinn Féin in multi-party talks without prior decommissioning of weapons within two months of an IRA ceasefire. After the IRA declared a new ceasefire in July 1997, Sinn Féin was admitted into multi-party talks, which produced the Good Friday Agreement in April 1998. One aim of the agreement was that all paramilitary groups in Northern Ireland fully disarm by May 2000. The IRA began decommissioning in a process that was monitored by Canadian General John de Chastelain's Independent International Commission on Decommissioning (IICD), with some weapons being decommissioned on 23 October 2001 and 8 April 2002. The October 2001 decommissioning was the first time an Irish republican paramilitary organisation had voluntarily disposed of its arms. (Note: After its defeat in the Irish Civil War in 1923 and at the end of the unsuccessful Border campaign in 1962, the IRA issued orders to retain weapons, and the Official IRA also retained its weapons following its 1972 ceasefire.) In October 2002 the devolved Northern Ireland Assembly was suspended by the British government and direct rule returned, in order to prevent a unionist walkout. (Note: The assembly remained suspended until May 2007, when Ian Paisley of the Democratic Unionist Party and Martin McGuinness of Sinn Féin became First Minister and deputy First Minister of Northern Ireland.) This was partly triggered by Stormontgate—allegations that republican spies were operating within the Parliament Buildings and the Police Service of Northern Ireland (PSNI) (Note: In 2001 the Royal Ulster Constabulary was reformed and renamed the Police Service of Northern Ireland as a result of the Patten Report.)—and the IRA temporarily broke off contact with de Chastelain. However, further decommissioning took place on 21 October 2003. In the aftermath of the December 2004 Northern Bank robbery, the Minister for Justice, Equality and Law Reform Michael McDowell stated there could be no place in government in either Northern Ireland or the Republic of Ireland for a party that supported or threatened the use of violence, possessed explosives or firearms, and was involved in criminality. At the beginning of February 2005, the IRA declared that it was withdrawing a decommissioning offer from late 2004. This followed a demand from the Democratic Unionist Party, under Paisley, insisting on photographic evidence of decommissioning.

=== End of the armed campaign ===
On 28 July 2005, the IRA, with a statement read to the media by Séanna Walsh, declared an end to the armed campaign, affirming that it would work to achieve its aims solely through peaceful political means and ordering volunteers to end all paramilitary activity. The IRA also stated it would complete the process of disarmament as quickly as possible. The IRA invited two independent witnesses to view the secret disarmament work, Catholic priest Father Alec Reid and Protestant minister Reverend Harold Good. On 26 September 2005, the IICD announced that "the totality of the IRA's arsenal" had been decommissioned. Jane's Information Group estimated that the IRA weaponry decommissioned in September 2005 included:

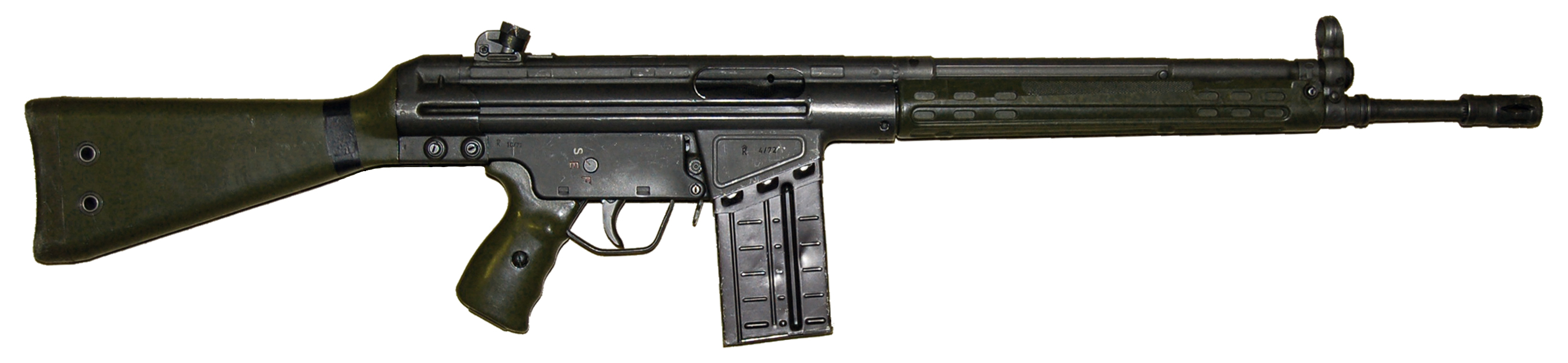
An AG-3, Norwegian made variant of the Heckler & Koch G3. Over 50 of these, from a batch of 100 stolen from the Norwegian Army, ended up with the IRA.

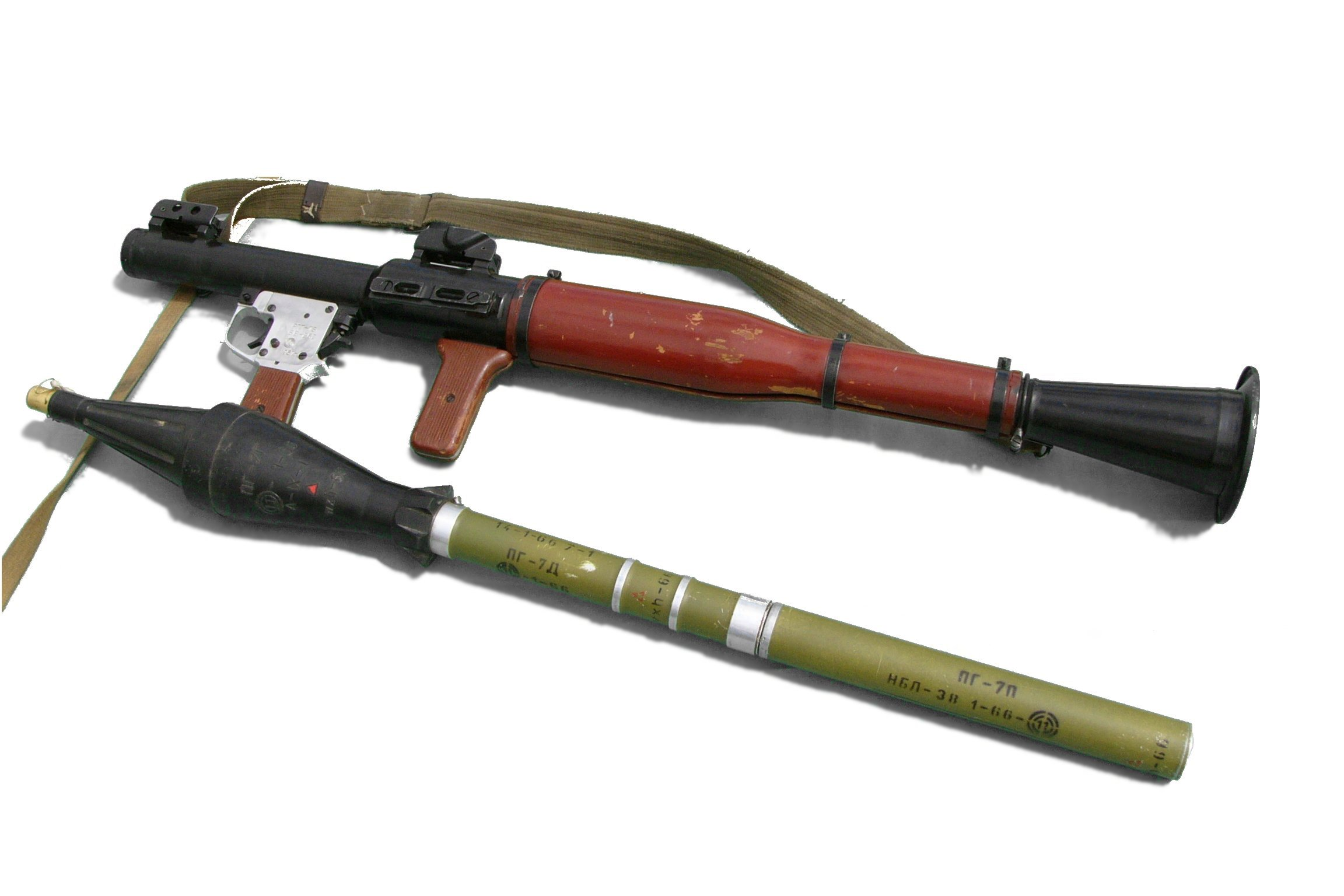
The RPG-7, first obtained by the IRA from Libya in 1972

- 1,000 rifles
- 2 tonnes of the plastic explosive Semtex
- 20–30 heavy machine guns
- 7 surface-to-air missiles
- 7 flamethrowers
- 1,200 detonators
- 11 rocket-propelled grenade launchers
- 90 handguns
- 100+ hand grenades

Having compared the weapons decommissioned with the British and Irish security forces' estimates of the IRA's arsenal, and because of the IRA's full involvement in the process of decommissioning the weapons, the IICD concluded that all IRA weaponry had been decommissioned. (Note: In 1992 Colonel Gaddafi is understood to have given the British government a detailed inventory of weapons he'd supplied to the IRA.) The Secretary of State for Northern Ireland, Peter Hain, said he accepted the conclusion of the IICD. Since then, there have been occasional claims in the media that the IRA had not decommissioned all of its weaponry. In response to such claims, the Independent Monitoring Commission (IMC) stated in its 10th report that the IRA had decommissioned all weaponry under its control. The report stated that if any weapons had been kept they would have been kept by individuals and against IRA orders. (Note: General de Chastelain has also stated weapons might have been lost due to a person responsible for them having died. Michael McKevitt, the IRA's quartermaster-general who left to form the Real IRA, was known to have taken materiel from IRA arm dumps.)

In February 2015, Garda Commissioner Nóirín O'Sullivan stated that the Republic of Ireland's police service, the Gardaí, have no evidence that the IRA's military structure remains operational or that the IRA is engaged in criminal activity. In August 2015, George Hamilton, the PSNI chief constable, stated that the IRA no longer exists as a paramilitary organisation. He added that some of its structure remains, but that the group is committed to following a peaceful political path and is not engaged in criminal activity nor directing violence. He pointed out, however, that some of its members have engaged in criminal activity or violence for their own, individual ends. The statement was made in response to the killings of former Belfast IRA commanders Kevin McGuigan and Gerard Davison. McGuigan was shot dead in what was believed to be a revenge killing by former IRA members over the shooting death three months earlier of Davison. (Note: The PSNI eventually revealed that McGuigan had been "spoken to" by the police as part of the Davison investigation but only "as a potential witness, not a suspect". A 2021 inquest hearing was told that detectives had not considered Mr McGuigan a suspect in Mr Davison's murder, though the inquest's report added that "others" did. McGuigan's son Pearse subsequently insisted that had "the police acted and published the information they have, it would have dispelled the rumours in the community and saved my father's life." See "Kevin McGuigan's son claims his father 'exonerated' over Gerard 'Jock' Davison murder ", Irish News, 10 January 2022.) The Chief Constable stated there was no evidence that the killing of McGuigan was sanctioned by the IRA leadership. Also in response, the British government commissioned the Assessment on Paramilitary Groups in Northern Ireland. The assessment, concluded in October 2015, was that "all the main paramilitary groups operating during the Troubles are still in existence, including the Ulster Volunteer Force, the Red Hand Commando, the Ulster Defence Association, the Provisional IRA, and Irish National Liberation Army." But, it added, "the leaderships of the main paramilitary groups [including the IRA's] are committed to peaceful means to achieve their political objectives."

== Weaponry and operations ==
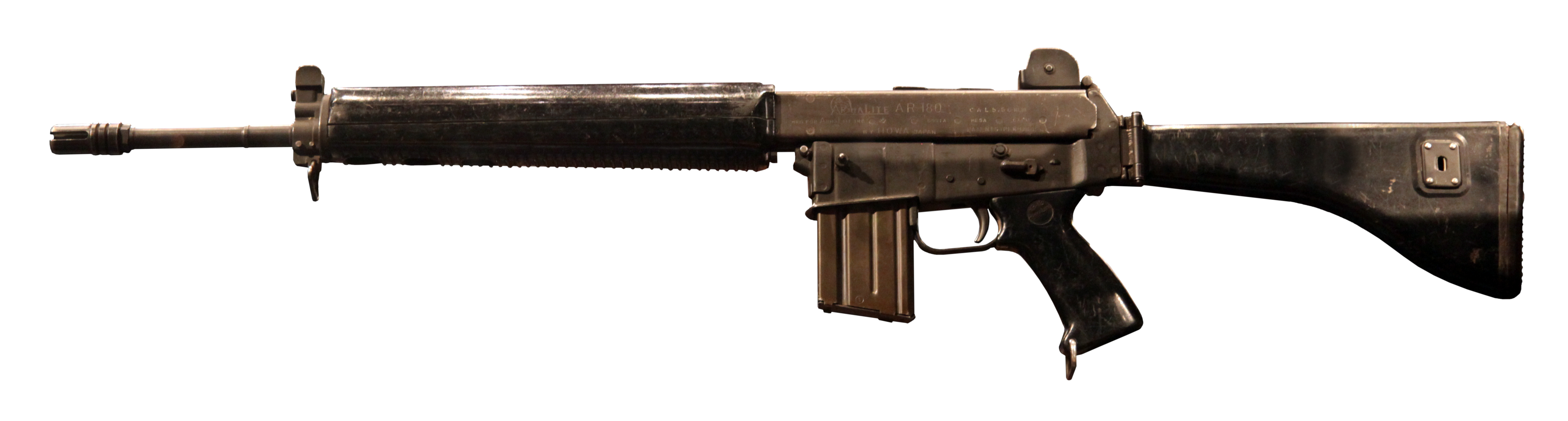
The Armalite AR-18, obtained by the IRA from the United States in the early 1970s, was a symbol of its armed campaign

In the early days of the Troubles the IRA was poorly armed: in Derry in early 1972 the IRA's weaponry consisted of six M1 carbines, two Thompson submachine guns, one or two M1 Garand rifles, and a variety of handguns. As a result of black market arms deals and donations from sympathisers, the IRA obtained a large array of weapons such as surface-to-air missiles; M60 machine guns; ArmaLite AR-18, FN FAL, AKM and M16 rifles; DShK heavy machine guns; LPO-50 flamethrowers; and Barrett M90 sniper rifles. The IRA also used a variety of bombs during its armed campaign, such as car and truck bombs, time bombs, and booby traps, using explosives including ANFO, gelignite and the plastic explosive Semtex. The IRA's engineering department also manufactured a series of improvised mortars in the Republic of Ireland, which by the 1990s were built to a standard comparable to military models. The IRA's development of mortar tactics was a response to the heavy fortifications on RUC and British Army bases; as IRA mortars generally fired indirectly they were able to bypass some perimeter security measures. The mortars used a variety of different firing mechanisms including delay timers, this combined with the disposable nature of the weapons allowed IRA volunteers to reduce the risk of being arrested at the scene.

The IRA was mainly active in Northern Ireland, although it also attacked targets in England and mainland Europe, and limited activity also took place in the Republic of Ireland. The IRA's offensive campaign mainly targeted the British Army (including the UDR) and the RUC, with British soldiers being the IRA's preferred target. Other targets included British government officials, politicians, establishment and judicial figures, and senior British Army and police officers. The bombing campaign principally targeted political, economic and military targets, and was described by counter-terrorism expert Andy Oppenheimer as "the biggest terrorist bombing campaign in history". Economic targets included shops, restaurants, hotels, railway stations and other public buildings. The IRA was blamed for the Abercorn Restaurant bombing in March 1972, when a bomb exploded without warning killing two women and injuring many people. (Note: The number of people injured has been variously reported as 70, 130, and 136.) Due to negative publicity after the Abercorn bombing, the IRA introduced a system of telephoned coded warnings to try to avoid civilian casualties while still causing the intended damage to properties and the economy. (Note: IRA bomb warnings included a code word known to the authorities, so it could be determined if a bomb warning was authentic. They were also used when issuing public statements to media organisations.) Civilian deaths were counter-productive to the IRA, as they provided the British with propaganda coups and affected recruitment and funding. Despite this IRA bombs continued to kill civilians, generally due to IRA mistakes and incompetence or errors in communication. These included the Donegall Street bombing which killed seven people including four civilians, and Bloody Friday, when nine people, five of them civilians, were killed when twenty-two bombs were planted in a one-mile radius of Belfast city centre. Premature explosions were another cause of civilian deaths, such as the Remembrance Day bombing which killed eleven people including ten civilians, and the Shankill Road bombing which killed ten people including eight civilians.

== Casualties ==
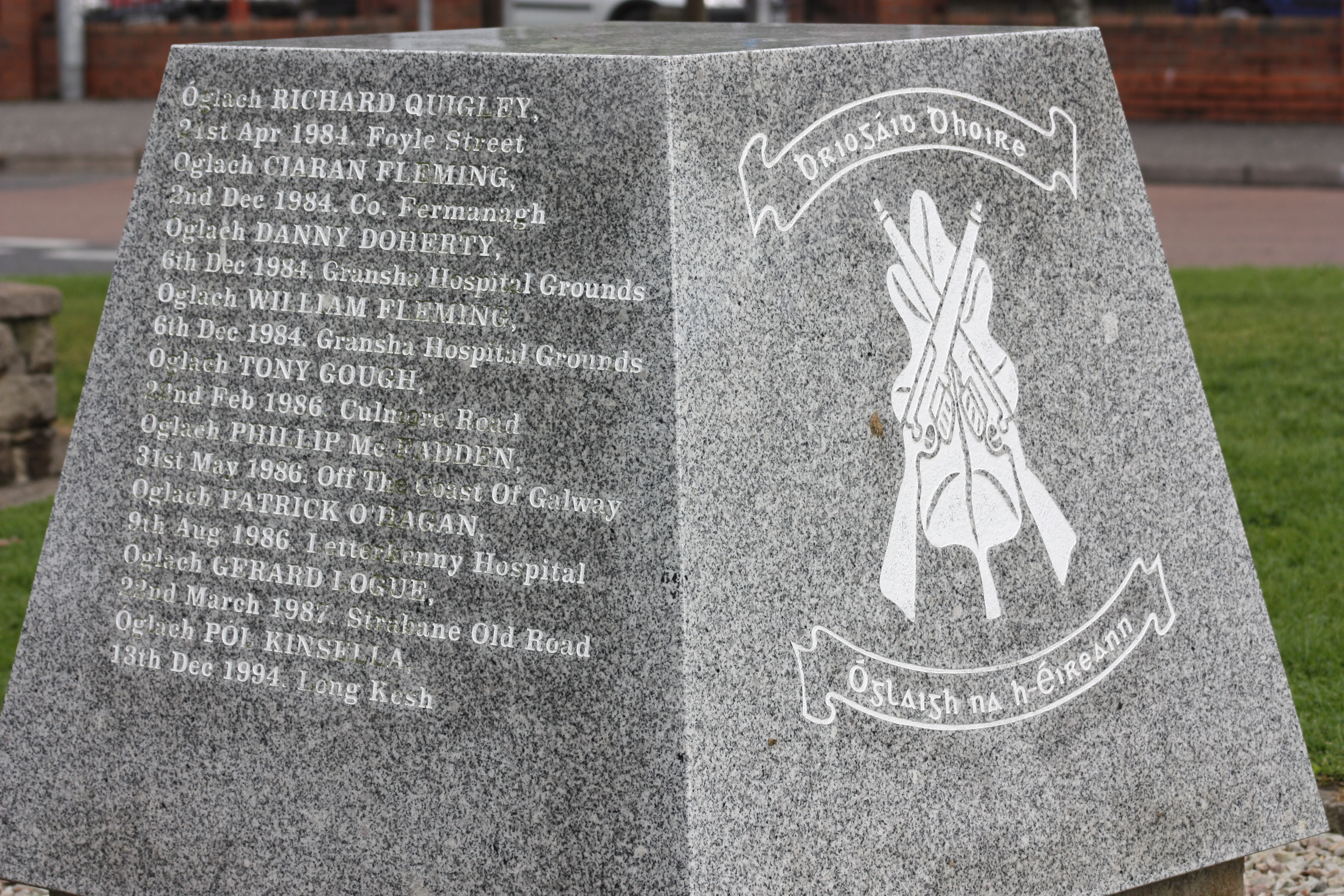
Memorial to members of the IRA's Derry Brigade

The IRA was responsible for more deaths than any other organisation during the Troubles. Two detailed studies of deaths in the Troubles, the Conflict Archive on the Internet (CAIN), and the book Lost Lives, differ slightly on the numbers killed by the IRA and the total number of conflict deaths. According to CAIN, the IRA was responsible for 1,705 deaths, about 48% of the total conflict deaths. Of these, 1,009 (about 59%) were members or former members of the British security forces, while 508 (about 29%) were civilians. According to Lost Lives, the IRA was responsible for 1,781 deaths, about 47% of the total conflict deaths. Of these, 944 (about 53%) were members of the British security forces, while 644 (about 36%) were civilians (including 61 former members of the security forces). The civilian figure also includes civilians employed by British security forces, politicians, members of the judiciary, and alleged criminals and informers. Most of the remainder were loyalist or republican paramilitary members, including over 100 IRA members accidentally killed by their own bombs or shot for being security force agents or informers. Overall, the IRA was responsible for 87–90% of the total British security force deaths, and 27–30% of the total civilian deaths.

During the IRA's campaign in England it was responsible for at least 488 incidents causing 2,134 injuries and 115 deaths, including 56 civilians and 42 British soldiers. (Note: In addition to bombings and occasional gun attacks in England, the IRA also used hoax bomb threats to disrupt the transport infrastructure. A hoax bomb threat also forced the evacuation of Aintree Racecourse, postponing the 1997 Grand National.) Between 275 and 300 IRA members were killed during the Troubles, with the IRA's biggest loss of life in a single incident being the Loughgall ambush in 1987, when eight volunteers attempting to bomb a police station were killed by the British Army's Special Air Service.

== Structure ==
Republican colour party in Dublin, March 2009. The blue flag being carried at the front is that of "Dublin Brigade IRA".

All levels of the organisation were entitled to send delegates to General Army Conventions. The convention was the IRA's supreme decision-making authority, and was supposed to meet every two years, or every four years following a change to the IRA's constitution in 1986. (Note: In addition to the scheduled General Army Conventions, the Executive, by a majority vote of its 12 members, had the power to order an Extraordinary General Army Convention, which would be attended by the delegates of the previous General Army Convention, where possible.) Before 1969 conventions met regularly, but owing to the difficulty in organising such a large gathering of an illegal organisation in secret, (Note: Delegates might spend over a day travelling to the General Army Convention, due to the elaborate security and countersurveillance arrangements. Delegates for the 1996 convention had to stop at four locations in order to change vehicles and be scanned for covert listening devices, and they were not permitted to bring mobile telephones or other electronic devices. The convention was guarded by the IRA's Internal Security Unit, who also monitored the local Garda Síochána station. Pre-arranged escape plans were in place in case of a police raid.) while the IRA's armed campaign was ongoing they were only held in September 1970, October 1986, and October or November 1996. After the 1997 ceasefire they were held more frequently, and are known to have been held in October 1997, May 1998, December 1998 or early 1999, and June 2002. The convention elected a 12-member Executive, which selected seven members, usually from within the Executive, to form the Army Council. (Note: The Executive and Army Council elected in September 1970 remained in place until 1986, filling vacancies by co-option when necessary.) Any vacancies on the Executive would then be filled by substitutes previously elected by the convention. For day-to-day purposes, authority was vested in the Army Council which, as well as directing policy and taking major tactical decisions, appointed a chief-of-staff from one of its number or, less often, from outside its ranks.

The chief-of-staff would be assisted by an adjutant general as well as a General Headquarters (GHQ) staff, which consisted of a quartermaster general, and directors of finance, engineering, training, intelligence, publicity, operations, and security. GHQ's largest department, the quartermaster general's, accounted for approximately 20% of the IRA's personnel, and was responsible for acquiring weapons and smuggling them to Ireland where they would be hidden in arms dumps, and distributed them to IRA units as needed. The next most important department was engineering, which manufactured improvised explosive devices and improvised mortars. Below GHQ, the IRA was divided into a Northern Command and a Southern Command. Northern Command operated in Northern Ireland as well as the border counties of Donegal, Leitrim, Cavan, Monaghan, and Louth, while Southern Command operated in the remainder of Ireland. In 1977, parallel to the introduction of cell structures at the local level, command of the "war-zone" was given to the Northern Command, which facilitated coordinated attacks across Northern Ireland and rapid alterations in tactics. Southern Command consisted of the Dublin Brigade and a number of smaller units in rural areas. Its main responsibilities were support activities for Northern Command, such as importation and storage of arms, providing safe houses, raising funds through robberies, and organising training camps. Another department attached to GHQ but separate from all other IRA structures was the England department, responsible for the bombing campaign in England.

The IRA referred to its ordinary members as volunteers (or óglaigh in Irish), to reflect the IRA being an irregular army which people were not forced to join and could leave at any time. Until the late 1970s, IRA volunteers were organised in units based on conventional military structures. Volunteers living in one area formed a company as part of a battalion, which could be part of a brigade, such as the Belfast Brigade, Derry Brigade, South Armagh Brigade, and East Tyrone Brigade. In late 1973 the Belfast Brigade restructured, introducing clandestine cells named active service units, consisting of between four and ten members. Similar changes were made elsewhere in the IRA by 1977, moving away from the larger conventional military organisational principle owing to its security vulnerability. The old structures were used for support activities such as policing nationalist areas, intelligence-gathering, and hiding weapons, while the bulk of attacks were carried out by active service units, using weapons controlled by the brigade's quartermaster. The exception to this reorganisation was the South Armagh Brigade, which retained its traditional hierarchy and battalion structure. Only a handful of volunteers from the South Armagh Brigade were convicted of serious offences, and it had fewer arrests than any other area, meaning that the security forces struggled to recruit informers. (Note: The South Armagh Brigade did not have similar security problems as other brigades for a variety of reasons. The locals were familiar with the terrain, in particular potential locations for covert observation posts used by soldiers. Local farmers frequently searched using dogs, and were known to pass on the locations of soldiers to the IRA. The small, close-knit communities also made it difficult for undercover soldiers to operate, as unfamiliar people and vehicles were immediately noticed by the locals. The brigade also introduced new recruits slowly, training them over a period of several years with more experienced volunteers which built up mutual trust. This, combined with the brigade's willingness to halt an operation if they feared it was compromised or conditions were not ideal, resulted in few arrests in the area. The lack of arrests, as well as IRA volunteers living across the border in the Republic of Ireland, meant it was difficult for the security forces to recruit informers.)

== Political ideology ==
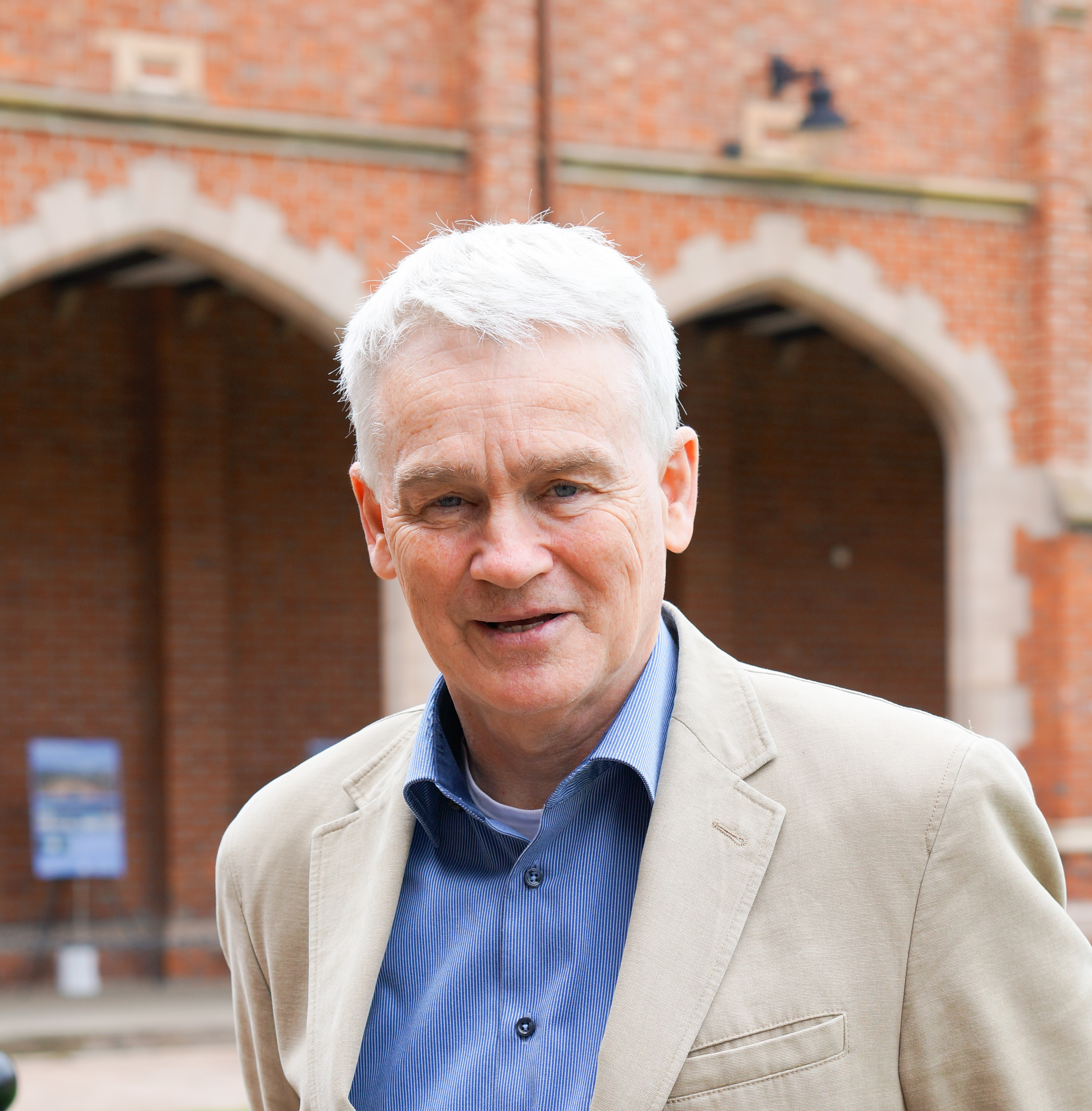
Former IRA volunteer Tommy McKearney, who left the IRA in 1986 and formed the League of Communist Republicans

The IRA's goal was an all-Ireland democratic socialist republic. Richard English, a professor at Queen's University Belfast, writes that while the IRA's adherence to socialist goals has varied according to time and place, radical ideas, specifically socialist ones, were a key part of IRA thinking. Former IRA volunteer Tommy McKearney states that while the IRA's goal was a socialist republic, there was no coherent analysis or understanding of socialism itself, other than an idea that the details would be worked out following an IRA victory. This was in contrast to the Official IRA and the Irish National Liberation Army, both of which adopted clearly defined Marxist positions. Similarly, the Northern Ireland left-wing politician Eamonn McCann has remarked that the Provisional IRA was considered a non-socialist IRA compared to the Official IRA.

During the 1980s, the IRA's commitment to socialism became more solidified as IRA prisoners began to engage with works of political and Marxist theory by authors such as Frantz Fanon, Che Guevara, Antonio Gramsci, Ho-Chi Minh, and General Giap. Members felt that an Irish version of the Tet Offensive could possibly be the key to victory against the British, pending on the arrival of weapons secured from Libya. However, this never came to pass, and the fall of the Berlin wall in 1989 brought a dogmatic commitment to socialism back into question, as possible socialist allies in Eastern Europe wilted away. In the years that followed, IRA prisoners began to look towards South African politics and the example being set by the African National Congress. Many of the imprisoned IRA members saw parallels between their own struggle and that of Nelson Mandela and were encouraged by Mandela's use of compromise following his ascent to power in South Africa to consider compromise themselves.

The IRA considered their campaign to be a continuation of events such as the Irish revolutionary period of 1916–1923, with IRA leader Ruairí Ó Brádaigh describing their campaign as "the current phase of the age-old Irish republican struggle".

== Categorisation ==
The IRA is a proscribed organisation in the United Kingdom under the Terrorism Act 2000, and an unlawful organisation in the Republic of Ireland under the Offences Against the State Acts, where IRA volunteers are tried in the non-jury Special Criminal Court. (Note: Prior to May 1972 IRA volunteers in the Republic of Ireland were tried in normal courts. The three judge Special Criminal Court was re-introduced following a series of regional court cases where IRA volunteers were acquitted or received light sentences from sympathetic juries and judges, and also to prevent jury tampering.) A similar system was introduced in Northern Ireland by the Northern Ireland (Emergency Provisions) Act 1973, with a Diplock court consisting of a single judge and no jury. The IRA rejected the authority of the courts in Northern Ireland and the Republic of Ireland, and its standing orders did not allow volunteers on trial in a criminal court to enter a plea or recognise the authority of the court; doing so could lead to expulsion from the IRA. (Note: There were occasional exceptions to this, there are several instances of female IRA volunteers being permitted to ask for bail and/or present a defence. This generally happened where the volunteer had children whose father was dead or imprisoned. There are some other cases where male IRA volunteers were permitted to present a defence.) These orders were relaxed in 1976 due to sentences in the Republic of Ireland for IRA membership being increased from two years to seven years imprisonment. IRA prisoners in the UK and the Republic of Ireland were granted conditional early release as part of the Good Friday Agreement. IRA members were often refused travel visas to enter the United States, due to previous criminal convictions or because the Immigration and Nationality Act bars the entry of people who are members of an organisation which advocates the overthrow of a government by force. (Note: There were occasional exceptions to this, such as in 1994 when US president Bill Clinton instructed the State Department to issue a visa to Joe Cahill, despite his criminal record including a conviction for the murder of an RUC officer in 1942. Cahill, who had been banned from entering the US since 1971, was permitted entry to brief Irish American supporters about the impending IRA ceasefire at a critical point in the Northern Ireland peace process.)

American TV news broadcasts used the terms "activists", "guerrillas", and "terrorists" to describe IRA members, while British TV news broadcasts commonly used the term "terrorists", particularly the BBC as part of its editorial guidelines published in 1989. Republicans reject the label of terrorism, instead describing the IRA's activity as war, military activity, armed struggle or armed resistance. The IRA prefer the terms freedom fighter, soldier, activist, or volunteer for its members. The IRA has also been described as a "private army". The IRA saw the Irish War of Independence as a guerrilla war which accomplished some of its aims, with some remaining "unfinished business".

An internal British Army document written by General Sir Mike Jackson and two other senior officers was released in 2007 under the Freedom of Information Act. It examined the British Army's 37 years of deployment in Northern Ireland, and described the IRA as "a professional, dedicated, highly skilled and resilient force", while loyalist paramilitaries and other republican groups were described as "little more than a collection of gangsters".

== Strength and support ==
=== Numerical strength ===
It is unclear how many people joined the IRA during the Troubles, as it did not keep detailed records of personnel. Journalists Eamonn Mallie and Patrick Bishop state roughly 8,000 people passed through the ranks of the IRA in the first 20 years of its existence, many of them leaving after arrest, retirement or disillusionment. McGuinness, who held a variety of leadership positions, (Note: Leadership positions Martin McGuinness was reported to have held in the IRA include officer commanding (OC) of the Derry Brigade (1970–1971), director of operations (1972), OC of Northern Command (1976), member of the Army Council (1977 onwards), and chief-of-staff (late 1970s–1982).) estimated a total membership of 10,000 over the course of the Troubles. The British Army estimates the IRA had 500 volunteers in July 1971, 130 in Derry and 340 in Belfast, (Note: At the same time there were 14,000 regular army soldiers deployed in Northern Ireland, in addition to 8,000 Ulster Defence Regiment soldiers and 6,000 Royal Ulster Constabulary officers.) journalist Ed Moloney states by the end of the year the IRA in Belfast had over 1,200 volunteers. After the late 1970s restructure, the British Army estimated the IRA had 500 full-time volunteers. A 1978 British Army report by Brigadier James Glover stated that the restructured IRA did not require the same number of volunteers as the early 1970s, and that a small number of volunteers could "maintain a disproportionate level of violence". Journalist Brendan O'Brien states by the late 1980s the IRA had roughly 300 active volunteers and 450 more in support roles, while historian Richard English states in 1988 the IRA was believed to have no more than thirty experienced gunmen and bombers, with a further twenty volunteers with less experience and 500 more in support roles. Moloney estimates in October 1996 the IRA had between 600 and 700 active volunteers.

=== Support from other countries and organisations ===
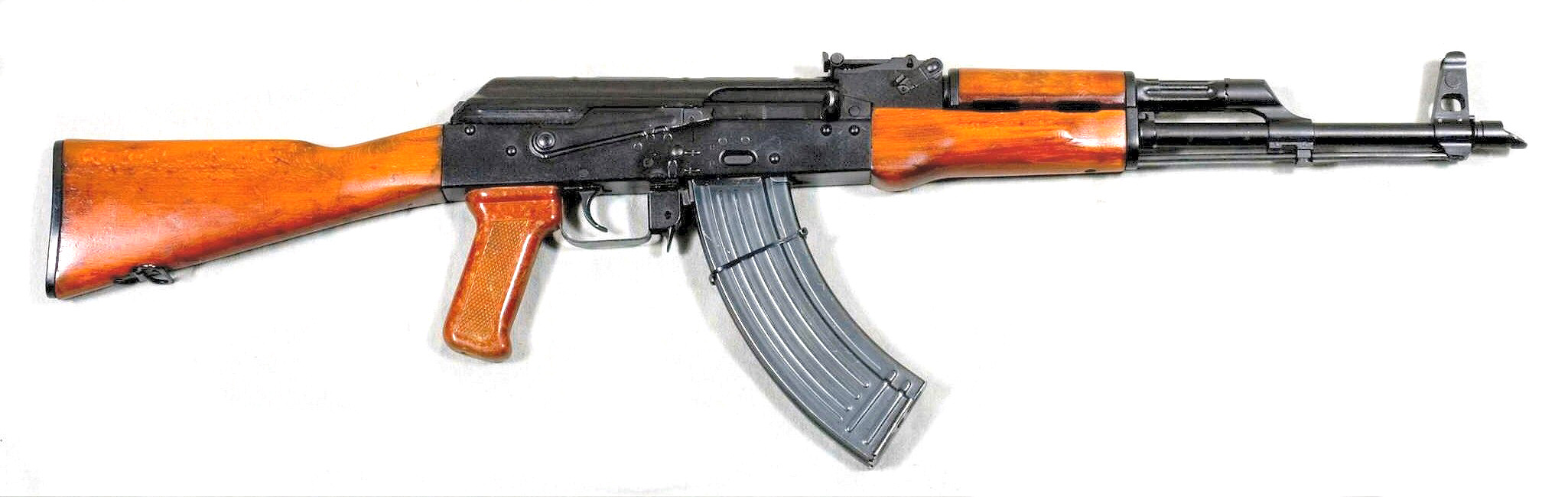
1,200 AKM assault rifles were donated by Muammar Gaddafi in the 1980s

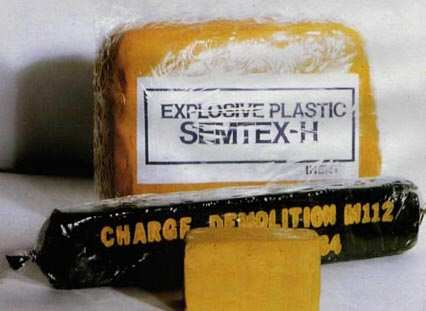
Over two tonnes of the plastic explosive Semtex were donated by Muammar Gaddafi in the 1980s

Libyan leader Colonel Muammar Gaddafi was a supplier of arms to the IRA, donating two shipments of arms in the early 1970s, and another five in the mid-1980s. The final shipment in 1987 was intercepted by French authorities, but the prior four shipments included 1,200 AKM assault rifles, 26 DShK heavy machine guns, 40 general-purpose machine guns, 33 RPG-7 rocket launchers, 10 SAM-7 surface-to-air missiles, 10 LPO-50 flamethrowers, and over two tonnes of plastic explosive Semtex. He also gave $12 million in cash to the IRA.

Irish Americans (both Irish immigrants and natives of Irish descent) also donated weapons and money. The financial backbone of IRA support in the United States was the Irish Northern Aid Committee (NORAID), founded by Irish immigrant and IRA veteran Michael Flannery. NORAID officially raised money for the families of IRA prisoners but was accused by opponents of being a front for the IRA and being involved in IRA gunrunning. The key IRA transatlantic gunrunning network was run by Irish immigrant and IRA veteran George Harrison, who estimated to have smuggled 2,000–2,500 weapons and approximately 1 million rounds of ammunition to Ireland. However, the Federal Bureau of Investigation arrested Harrison for IRA arms smuggling in June 1981, thereby blocking the IRA's arms supply from America. This forced the IRA to focus on importing weaponry from its already-established networks in Europe and the Middle East. In addition, Irish American support for the Republican cause began to weaken in the mid-1970s and gradually diminished in the 1980s due to bad publicity surrounding IRA atrocities and NORAID. By 1998, only $3.6 million were raised in America for the Irish Republican cause, in which many historians and scholars agreed such an amount was too small to make an actual difference in the conflict.

Irish Canadians, Irish Australians, and Irish New Zealanders were also active in supporting the Republican cause. More than A$20,000 were sent per year to the IRA from supporters in Australia by the 1990s. Canadian supporters did not just fundraise and import weapons, but also smuggled IRA and Sinn Féin members into the United States, which, unlike Canada, enacted a visa ban on such members on the basis of advocating violence since the early 1970s. Gearóid Ó Faoleán wrote that "[i]n 1972, inclement weather forced a light aeroplane to reroute to Shannon Airport from Farranfore in County Kerry, where IRA volunteers had been awaiting its arrival. The plane, piloted by a Canadian [IRA supporter], had flown from Libya with at least one cargo of arms that included RPG-7 rocket launchers" where IRA smuggled these weapons into safe houses for its armed campaign. In 1974, seven Canadian residents (six who were originally from Belfast) were arrested by the Royal Canadian Mounted Police for smuggling weapons to the IRA after "raids in St. Catharines, Tavistock and Toronto and at the U.S. border at Windsor". Philip Kent, one of those arrested, was discovered in his car for having "fifteen FN rifles and a .50 calibre machine gun".

Former MI5 agent Willie Carlin said that one of the main reasons why the IRA Army Council did not attack Scotland during the conflict was because doing so would reduce support from Scots and have a negative impact on its fundraising and other activities there. Carlin explained that "[t]here were politicians in Scotland, a lot of whom were very sympathetic to the nationalist cause, and even the Sinn Fein cause". He also noted that while much of the money was donated by supporters in Glasgow, funds also came from all over the country, from "farmers up there who had family and relatives in Ireland".

The IRA had links with the Basque separatist group ETA. Maria McGuire states the IRA received fifty revolvers from ETA in exchange for explosives training. In 1973 the IRA was accused by the Spanish police of providing explosives for the assassination of Spanish prime minister Luis Carrero Blanco in Madrid, and the following year an ETA spokesman told German magazine Der Spiegel they had "very good relations" with the IRA. In 1977 a representative of the Basque political party Euskal Iraultzarako Alderdia attended Sinn Féin's 1977 ard fheis, and Ó Brádaigh had a close relationship with Basque separatists, regularly visiting the Basque region between 1977 and 1983. The IRA received support from the Palestine Liberation Organization (PLO) in the 1970s, with volunteers attending training camps in the Middle East. In 1977 a shipment of arms from the PLO was seized in Antwerp, Belgium. The shipment included twenty-nine AK-47 assault rifles, twenty-nine French submachine guns, seven RPG-7 rocket launchers and sixty rocket-propelled grenades, two Bren light machine guns, mortars, grenades and ammunition. PLO leader Yasser Arafat distanced himself from the IRA following the assassination of Lord Mountbatten in 1979.

In May 1996, the Federal Security Service, Russia's internal security service, accused Estonia of arms smuggling, and claimed that the IRA had bought weapons from arms dealers linked to Estonia's volunteer defence force, Kaitseliit. In 2001, three Irishmen, known as the Colombia Three, were arrested and accused of training Colombian guerrillas, the Revolutionary Armed Forces of Colombia (FARC). The Irish Minister for Justice, Equality and Law Reform stated the IRA was to be paid up to $35 million to train FARC in bomb-making techniques, including shaped charges, propane bombs, landmines and the construction of mortars. In 2005 a commander in the National Army of Colombia stated IRA techniques were being used all over Colombia by FARC, and British military experts confirmed bombs used by FARC had previously been used by the IRA. The Colombia Three were acquitted at trial in April 2004, before this was reversed at an appeal court in December 2004 although the men had fled the country and returned to Ireland before the appeal court verdict.

=== Financing ===
While overseas financial support was generally appreciated, the vast majority of the IRA revenue came from activities in the Republic of Ireland and Northern Ireland. Since the Troubles began, the IRA was involved in criminal activities such as robberies, counterfeiting, protection rackets, kidnapping for ransom, fuel laundering and cigarette smuggling in order to fund its armed campaign. The IRA also raised funds by running legitimate businesses such as taxi firms, nightclubs, offices, and nursing homes. British law enforcement estimated that, by the 1990s, the IRA needed £10.5 million a year to operate. IRA supporters argue that as it was a clandestine organisation it was forced to use extralegal methods of fundraising, which were justified in order to achieve a political goal. However, this activity allowed the British government to portray the IRA as no more than a criminal gang. Armed robberies of banks, trains and small businesses across Ireland were a significant source of funding for the IRA, with over 1,000 raids on post offices in Northern Ireland. The PSNI, the IMC, and the British and Irish governments all accused the IRA of involvement in the biggest bank raid in British history—the 2004 Northern Bank robbery—when £26.5 million was stolen, which the IRA denied. In April 1987, RUC chief constable John Hermon told government ministers at the Anglo-Irish Intergovernmental Conference that "[i]t costs the IRA £2–£3 million per year to maintain its activity. That amount is no problem to them and they have no shortage of money to purchase weapons."

The Northern Ireland Affairs Select Committee in its 26 June 2002 report stated that "the importance of overseas donations has been exaggerated and donations from the USA have formed only a small portion of IRA income." It identified extortion, fuel laundering, rum-running, tobacco smuggling, armed robbery, and counterfeiting in Ireland and Britain as the primary sources of funding for both Republican and Loyalist militants throughout and after the Troubles, while "the sums involved [from overseas] [were and] are comparatively small". The committee estimated that the Provisional IRA made £5–8 million a year while spending £1.5m annually to carry out its campaign. One IRA interviewee stated that starting in the 1970s for example:

Belfast ran itself for years on its [social] clubs. You know the clubs? They formed the clubs, earlier on they formed it and ... the car parks, you know, not building them but taking over areas and running them as car parks. There was no one to say how much you took in and how much you took out and so, you know, if there was twenty-thousand coming in every week you could say there's twelve-thousand coming in and then there's eight-thousand going one way, and you paid your people and say there's so much going every week. And that financed the movement.

Generally, the IRA was against drug dealing and prostitution, because it would be unpopular within Catholic communities and for moral reasons. The chief of the RUC Drugs Squad, Kevin Sheehy, said the IRA tried to prevent volunteers being directly involved with drugs, and noted one occasion when an IRA member caught with a small amount of cannabis was "disowned and humiliated" in his local area. The IRA targeted drug dealers with punishment shootings and ordered them to leave Ireland, and some were killed using the covername Direct Action Against Drugs. However, there are claims the IRA "licensed" certain dealers to operate and forced them to pay protection money. Following the murder of Robert McCartney in 2005, the IRA expelled three IRA volunteers. Adams said at Sinn Féin's 2005 ard fheis "There is no place in republicanism for anyone involved in criminality", while adding "we refuse to criminalise those who break the law in pursuit of legitimate political objectives". This was echoed shortly after by an IRA statement issued at Easter, saying that criminality within the ranks would not be tolerated. In 2008, the IMC stated that the IRA was no longer involved in criminality, but that some members have engaged in criminality for their own ends, without the sanction or support of the IRA.

=== Popular support ===
Support for the IRA within nationalist communities and within the Republic of Ireland fluctuated over the course of the conflict. In September 1979 the Economic and Social Research Institute conducted a wide-ranging survey of attitudes to the IRA in the Republic. Its findings showed that 20.7% broadly supported IRA activities, while 60.5% opposed them. Meanwhile, when respondents were asked whether they sympathised or rejected their motives, 44.8% of respondents expressed some level of sympathy with their motives while 33.5% broadly rejected them. A study in 1999 showed amongst Catholics in Northern Ireland, 42% of respondents expressed sympathy with republican violence while 52% said they had no sympathy. The same study found 39.7% of respondents in the Republic of Ireland sympathised with republican violence.

According to a 2022 poll, 69% of Irish nationalists polled believe there was no option but "violent resistance to British rule during the Troubles".

== Other activities ==
=== Sectarian attacks ===
The IRA publicly condemned sectarianism and sectarian attacks, however some IRA members did carry out sectarian attacks. Of those killed by the IRA, Malcolm Sutton classifies 130 (about 7%) of them as sectarian killings of Protestants, 88 of them committed between 1974 and 1976. Unlike loyalists, the IRA denied responsibility for sectarian attacks and the members involved used cover names, such as "Republican Action Force", which was used to claim responsibility for the 1976 Kingsmill massacre where ten Protestant civilians were killed in a gun attack. They stated that their attacks on Protestants were retaliation for attacks on Catholics. Many in the IRA opposed these sectarian attacks, but others deemed them effective in preventing similar attacks on Catholics. Robert White, a professor at the Indiana University, states the IRA was generally not a sectarian organisation, and Rachel Kowalski from the Department of War Studies, King's College London states that the IRA acted in a way that was mostly blind to religious diversity.

Protestants in the rural border areas of counties Fermanagh and Tyrone, where the number of members of the security forces killed was high, viewed the IRA's campaign as ethnic cleansing. Henry Patterson, a professor at the University of Ulster, concludes that while the IRA's campaign was unavoidably sectarian, it did not amount to ethnic cleansing. Although the IRA did not specifically target these people because of their religious affiliation, more Protestants joined the security forces so many people from that community believed the attacks were sectarian. McKearney argues that due to the British government's Ulsterisation policy increasing the role of the locally recruited RUC and UDR, the IRA had no choice but to target them because of their local knowledge, but acknowledges that Protestants viewed this as a sectarian attack on their community.

=== Vigilantism ===
An IRA signpost with the word "Provoland" underneath in Omagh, County Tyrone

During the Troubles, the IRA took on the role of policing in some nationalist areas of Northern Ireland. Many nationalists did not trust the official police force—the RUC—and saw it as biased against their community. The RUC found it difficult to operate in certain nationalist neighbourhoods and only entered in armoured convoys due to the risk of attack, preventing community policing that could have occurred if officers patrolled on foot. In these neighbourhoods, many residents expected the IRA to act as a policing force, and such policing had propaganda value for the IRA.

The IRA also sought to minimise contact between residents and the RUC, because residents might pass on information or be forced to become a police informer. The IRA set up arbitration panels that would adjudicate and investigate complaints from locals about criminal or 'anti-social' activities. First time offenders may have been given a warning, or for more serious offences a curfew may have been imposed. Those responsible for more serious and repeat offences could have been given a punishment beating, or banished from the community. Kneecapping was also used by the IRA as a form of punishment. No punishment attacks have been officially attributed to the IRA since February 2006.

The vigilantism of the IRA and other paramilitary organisations has been condemned as "summary justice". In January 1971, the IRA and British Army held secret talks aimed at stopping persistent rioting in Ballymurphy. It was agreed that the IRA would be responsible for policing there, but the agreement was short-lived. During the 1975 ceasefire incident centres were set up across Northern Ireland, staffed by Sinn Féin members who dealt with incidents that might endanger the truce. Residents went there to report crime as well as to make complaints about the security forces. The incident centres were seen by locals as "IRA police stations" and gave some legitimacy to the IRA as a policing force. Following the end of the ceasefire the incident centres remained open as Sinn Féin offices where crime continued to be reported, to be dealt with by the IRA.

=== Informers ===
Throughout the Troubles, some members of the IRA passed information to the security forces. In the 1980s, many IRA members were arrested after being implicated by former IRA members known as "supergrasses" such as Raymond Gilmour. (Note: Thirty-five people implicated by Gilmour were acquitted following a six-month trial in 1984, with Lord Lowry, the Lord Chief Justice of Northern Ireland, describing Gilmour as a "man to whose lips a lie invariably came more naturally than the truth". While some convictions were obtained in other supergrass trials, the verdicts were overturned by Northern Ireland's Court of Appeal. This was due to convictions being based solely on the evidence of dubious witnesses, as most supergrasses were paramilitaries giving evidence in return for a shorter prison sentence or immunity from prosecution.) There have been some high-profile allegations of senior IRA figures having been British informers. In May 2003, an American website named Freddie Scappaticci as being a British spy code-named Stakeknife. Scappaticci was said to be a high-level IRA informer working for the British Army's Force Research Unit, while he was head of the IRA's Internal Security Unit, which interrogated and killed suspected informers. Scappaticci denied being Stakeknife, and involvement in IRA activity. In December 2005, Sinn Féin member and former IRA volunteer Denis Donaldson appeared at a press conference in Dublin and confessed to being a British spy since the early 1980s. Donaldson, who ran Sinn Féin's operations in New York during the Northern Ireland peace process, was expelled by the party. Other prominent informers include Eamon Collins, Sean O'Callaghan, and Roy McShane, who worked as a driver for the leadership of Sinn Féin including Adams.

The IRA regarded informers as traitors, and a threat to the organisation and lives of its members. Suspected informers were dealt with by the IRA's Internal Security Unit, which carried out an investigation and interrogated the suspects. Following this a court martial would take place, consisting of three members of equal or higher rank than the accused, plus a member of GHQ or the Army Council acting as an observer. Any death sentence would be ratified by the Army Council, who would be informed of the verdict by the observer. The original IRA, and all the major paramilitary organisations active during the Troubles, also killed alleged informers. The IRA usually killed informers with a single shot to the head, and left many of their bodies in public to deter other informers. There was also a group of sixteen people known as the Disappeared who were secretly buried between 1972 and 1985, which included alleged informers, agents for the security forces, and people that stole IRA weapons and used them in armed robberies. (Note: One of the Disappeared, Seamus Ruddy, was killed by the Irish National Liberation Army.) In March 1999, the IRA apologised for the "prolonged anguish" caused to the families of the Disappeared, and stated it had identified the burial places of nine people, including the most high-profile victim, Jean McConville, a Catholic civilian and widowed mother-of-ten. This led to the recovery of three bodies later in 1999, although Jean McConville's body was not recovered until August 2003. As of 2019, the bodies of Columba McVeigh, Joe Lynskey, and undercover British Army intelligence officer Robert Nairac have yet to be recovered.

== Splinter groups ==
Former IRA volunteers are involved in various dissident republican splinter groups, which are active in the low-level dissident Irish republican campaign. The oldest dissident group is the Continuity IRA, which formed in 1986 following a split in the republican movement, over the decision to allow members, if elected, to take seats in Dáil Éireann. This group was inactive for several years while acquiring weapons and finance, their first attack was in 1994 during the Provisional IRA's first ceasefire. The Real IRA was formed in November 1997 when senior Provisional IRA members, including quartermaster-general Michael McKevitt, resigned over acceptance of the Mitchell Principles. (Note: The Mitchell Principles were ground rules written by US senator George J. Mitchell governing the entry of political parties to all-party talks, which included a commitment to non-violence and the decommissioning of weapons.) The Real IRA is best known for the 1998 Omagh bombing which killed 29 civilians, and the 2009 Massereene Barracks shooting which killed two British soldiers. In 2005/6 some Provisional IRA members defected and formed Óglaigh na hÉireann, which became active in 2009. This group also included former members of the Irish National Liberation Army and a faction that splintered from the Real IRA. In 2011, a group calling itself "the IRA" claimed responsibility for the murder of Ronan Kerr, a Catholic member of the PSNI. The group was believed to have formed in 2008, and included former senior Provisional IRA members unhappy at Sinn Féin's direction and the peace process. Also in 2008, Republican Action Against Drugs (RAAD) was formed in Derry. This vigilante group's membership included former Provisional IRA members and members of other republican groups. RAAD, "the IRA", and some smaller groups merged with the Real IRA in 2012 to form the New IRA.

== Notes and references ==
=== Bibliography ===
- Ackerman, Gary. A (2016). "The Provisional Irish Republican Army and the Development of Mortars". Journal of Strategic Security. 9 (1): 12–34. doi:10.5038/1944-0472.9.1.1501 – via Scholar Commons.
- Aldridge, Meryl; Hewitt, Nicholas (1994). Controlling Broadcasting: Access Policy and Practice in North America and Europe. Manchester University Press. ISBN 978-0719042775.
- Armstrong, Charles I.; Herbert, David; Mustad, Jan Erik (2019). The Legacy of the Good Friday Agreement: Northern Irish Politics, Culture and Art after 1998. Palgrave Macmillan. ISBN 978-3319912318.
- BBC News Magazine (28 September 2005). "Who is P O'Neill?". BBC News.
- Bean, Kevin (2007). The New Politics of Sinn Féin. Oxford University Press. ISBN 978-1846311468.
- Biersteker, Thomas J.; Eckert, Sue E.; Williams, Phil (2007). Countering the Financing of Terrorism. Routledge. ISBN 978-0415396431.
- Bowyer Bell, J. (1990). IRA: Tactics & Targets. Poolbeg Press. ISBN 1-85371-257-4.
- Bowyer Bell, J. (1997). The Secret Army: The IRA. Transaction Publishers. ISBN 1-56000-901-2.
- Bowyer Bell, J. (2000). The IRA, 1968-2000: An Analysis of a Secret Army. Routledge. ISBN 978-0714681191.
- Boyne, Sean (2006). Gunrunners: The Covert Arms Trail to Ireland. O'Brien Press. ISBN 0-86278-908-7.
- Brown, Joseph M. (2020). Force of Words: The Logic of Terrorist Threats. Columbia University Press. ISBN 978-0231193696.
- Campbell, Anne (24 February 2015). "'No info' provos involved in crimes". Irish Independent.
- Clancy, Mary-Alice C. (2010). Peace Without Consensus: Power Sharing Politics in Northern Ireland. Ashgate Publishing. ISBN 978-0754678311.
- Clarke, Liam; Johnston, Kathryn (2001). Martin McGuinness: From Guns to Government. Mainstream Publishing. ISBN 9-781840-184730.
- Connelly, Mark (2012). The IRA on Film and Television: A History. McFarland & Company. ISBN 978-0786447367.
- Conway, Vicky (2015). Policing Twentieth Century Ireland: A History of An Garda Síochána. Routledge. ISBN 978-1138899988.
- Coogan, Tim Pat (2002). The Troubles: Ireland's Ordeal and the Search for Peace. St. Martin's Griffin. ISBN 978-0312294182.
- Coogan, Tim Pat (2000). The I.R.A. HarperCollins. ISBN 978-0006531555.
- Cox, Michael; Guelke, Adrian; Stephen, Fiona (2006). A Farewell to Arms? Beyond the Good Friday Agreement. Manchester University Press. ISBN 978-0719071157.
- Dempster, Lauren (2019). Transitional Justice and the 'Disappeared' of Northern Ireland: Silence, Memory, and the Construction of the Past. Routledge. ISBN 978-0815375647.
- Dillon, Martin (1990). The Dirty War. Arrow Books. ISBN 0-09-984520-2.
- Dillon, Martin (1996). 25 Years of Terror: The IRA's war against the British. Bantam Books. ISBN 978-0-553-40773-0.
- Dingley, James (2008). Combating Terrorism in Northern Ireland. Routledge. ISBN 978-0415367332.
- Dingley, James (2012). The IRA: The Irish Republican Army. Praeger Publishing. ISBN 978-0313387036.
- English, Richard (2003). Armed Struggle: The History of the IRA. Pan Books. ISBN 0-330-49388-4.
- Eriksson, Anna (2009). Justice in Transition: Community restorative justice in Northern Ireland. Willan Publishing. ISBN 978-1843925187.
- Fay, Marie-Therese; Morrissey, Mike; Smyth, Marie (1999). Northern Ireland's Troubles: The Human Costs. Pluto Press. ISBN 978-0745313795.
- Feeney, Brian (2002). Sinn Féin: A Hundred Turbulent Years. O'Brien Press. ISBN 978-0862786953.
- Findlay, Mark (1993). Alternative Policing Styles: Cross-Cultural Perspectives. Springer Publishing. ISBN 978-9065447104.
- Frampton, Martyn (2009). The Long March: The Political Strategy of Sinn Féin, 1981-2007. Palgrave Macmillan. ISBN 978-0230202177.
- Geraghty, Tony (1998). The Irish War: The Military History of a Domestic Conflict. HarperCollins. ISBN 978-0-00-638674-2.
- Gillespie, Gordon (2009). The A to Z of the Northern Ireland Conflict. Scarecrow Press. ISBN 978-0810868823.
- Goodspeed, Michael (2001). When Reason Fails: Portraits of Armies at War - America, Britain, Israel and the Future (Studies in Military History and International Affairs). Praeger Publishing. ISBN 978-0275973780.
- Grant, Patrick (2001). Rhetoric and Violence in Northern Ireland, 1968-98: Hardened to Death. Palgrave Macmillan. ISBN 978-1-349-42006-3.
- Hamill, Heather (2010). The Hoods: Crime and Punishment in Belfast: Crime and Punishment in West Belfast. Princeton University Press. ISBN 978-0691119632.
- Hamilton, George (22 August 2015). "Chief Constable's statement – PSNI's assessment of the current status of the Provisional IRA". Police Service of Northern Ireland. Archived from the original on 24 August 2015.
- Hanley, Brian; Millar, Scott (2010). The Lost Revolution: The Story of the Official IRA and the Workers' Party. Penguin Books. ISBN 978-0141028453.
- Harding, Thomas (9 September 2002). "IRA's hardline faction gets a stronger voice". The Daily Telegraph.
- Harnden, Toby (1999). Bandit Country: The IRA & South Armagh. Hodder & Stoughton. ISBN 0-340-71736-X.
- Hayes, David (1980). Terrorists and Freedom Fighters : People, Politics and Powers Series. Main Line Book Co. ISBN 978-0853406525.
- Hayes, Bernadette C.; McAllister, Ian (2005). "Public Support for Political Violence and Paramilitarism in Northern Ireland and the Republic of Ireland". Terrorism and Political Violence. 17 (4): 599–617. doi:10.1080/095465590944569. S2CID 331741.
- Hennessy, Thomas (2013). Hunger Strike: Margaret Thatcher's Battle with the IRA: 1980-1981. Irish Academic Press. ISBN 978-0716531760.
- Holland, Jack (1989). The American Connection: US Guns, Money and Influence in Northern Ireland. Poolbeg Press. ISBN 978-1853710568.
- Holland, Jack; McDonald, Henry (2010). INLA Deadly Divisions. Poolbeg Press. ISBN 978-1842234389.
- Horgan, John; Taylor, Max (1997). "Proceedings of the Irish Republican Army General Army Convention, December 1969". Terrorism and Political Violence. 9 (4): 151–158. doi:10.1080/09546559708427434.
- Horgan, John; Taylor, Max (1999). "Playing the 'Green Card' – Financing the Provisional IRA: Part 1" (PDF). Terrorism and Political Violence. 11 (2): 1–38. doi:10.1080/09546559908427502. Archived from the original (PDF) on 11 September 2009.
- Horgan, John (2013). Divided We Stand: The Strategy and Psychology of Ireland's Dissident Terrorists. Oxford University Press. ISBN 978-0199772858.
- Independent Monitoring Commission (October 2006). "Twelfth report of the Independent Monitoring Commission" (PDF). The Stationery Office.
- Ingram, Martin; Harkin, Greg (2004). Stakeknife: Britain's Secret Agents in Ireland. O'Brien Press. ISBN 978-0862788438.
- Jackson, Richard; Breen Smyth, Marie; Gunning, Jeroen (2009). Critical Terrorism Studies: A New Research Agenda. Routledge. ISBN 978-0415455077.
- Kennedy, Liam (2020). Who Was Responsible for the Troubles? The Northern Ireland Conflict. McGill–Queen's University Press. ISBN 978-0228003687.
- Kowalski, Rachel Caroline (2018). "The role of sectarianism in the Provisional IRA campaign, 1969–1997". Terrorism and Political Violence. 30 (4): 658–683. doi:10.1080/09546553.2016.1205979. S2CID 147762525.
- Leahy, Thomas (2020). The Intelligence War against the IRA. Cambridge University Press. ISBN 978-1108487504.
- McCann, Eamonn (1993). War and an Irish Town. Pluto Press. ISBN 9780745307251.
- McElrath, Karen (2000). Unsafe Haven: The United States, the IRA and Political Prisoners. Pluto Press. ISBN 978-0745313221.
- McGladdery, Gary (2006). The Provisional IRA in England: The Bombing Campaign 1973–1997. Irish Academic Press. ISBN 9780716533733.
- McKearney, Tommy (2011). The Provisional IRA: From Insurrection to Parliament. Pluto Press. ISBN 978-0-7453-3074-7.
- McKittrick, David; Kelters, Seamus; Feeney, Brian; Thornton, Chris; McVea, David (2004). Lost Lives: The Stories of the Men, Women and Children Who Died as a Result of the Northern Ireland Troubles. Mainstream Publishing. ISBN 978-1840185041.
- McKittrick, David; McVea, David (2012). Making Sense of the Troubles: A History of the Northern Ireland Conflict. Penguin Books. ISBN 978-0241962657.
- Mallie, Eamonn; Bishop, Patrick (1988). The Provisional IRA. Corgi Books. ISBN 0-7475-3818-2.
- Moloney, Ed (2007). A Secret History of the IRA (2nd ed.). Penguin Books. ISBN 978-0141028767.
- Mulroe, Patrick (2017). Bombs, Bullets and the Border: Policing Ireland's Frontier. Irish Academic Press. ISBN 978-1911024491.
- Munck, Ronnie (1992). "The Making of the Troubles in Northern Ireland". Journal of Contemporary History. 27 (2): 211–229. doi:10.1177/002200949202700201. ISSN 0022-0094. JSTOR 260908. S2CID 154412345.
- Nordstrom, Carolyn; Martin, JoAnn (1992). The Paths to Domination, Resistance, and Terror. University of California Press. ISBN 978-0520073166.
- O'Brien, Brendan (1999). The Long War – The IRA and Sinn Féin. O'Brien Press. ISBN 0-86278-606-1.
- Ó Dochartaigh, Niall (2015). "The Longest Negotiation: British Policy, IRA Strategy and the Making of the Northern Ireland Peace Settlement". Political Studies. 63 (1): 202–220. doi:10.1111/1467-9248.12091. hdl:10379/6839. S2CID 220121839.
- Ó Faoleán, Gearóid (2019). A Broad Church: The Provisional IRA in the Republic of Ireland, 1969–1980. Merrion Press. ISBN 978-1785372452.
- O'Leary, Brendan (2019a). A Treatise on Northern Ireland, Volume I: Colonialism. Oxford University Press. ISBN 978-0199243341.
- O'Leary, Brendan (2019b). A Treatise on Northern Ireland, Volume III: Consociation and Confederation. Oxford University Press. ISBN 978-0198830580.
- O'Sullivan, Noël (1986). Terrorism, Ideology And Revolution: The Origins Of Modern Political Violence. Routledge. ISBN 978-0367289928.
- Oppenheimer, A.R. (2008). IRA: The Bombs and the Bullets: A History of Deadly Ingenuity. Irish Academic Press. ISBN 978-0716528951.
- Oppenheimer, Andy (2009). "IRA Technology". The Counter Terrorist. 2 (4). ISSN 1941-8639. Archived from the original on 8 August 2020.
- Patterson, Henry (2010). "Sectarianism Revisited: The Provisional IRA Campaign in a Border Region of Northern Ireland". Terrorism and Political Violence. 22 (3): 337–356. doi:10.1080/09546551003659335. S2CID 145671577.
- Quilligan, Michael (2013). Understanding Shadows: The Corrupt Use of Intelligence. Clarity Press. ISBN 978-0985335397.
- Reed, David (1984). Ireland: The Key to the British Revolution. Larkin Publications. ISBN 978-0905400044.
- Reinisch, Dieter (7 September 2018). "Dreaming of an "Irish Tet Offensive": Irish Republican prisoners & the origins of the Peace Process". European University Institute.
- Rowan, Brian (2003). The Armed Peace: Life and Death after the Ceasefires. Mainstream Publishing. ISBN 1-84018-754-9.
- Sanders, Andrew (2012). Inside The IRA: Dissident Republicans And The War For Legitimacy. Edinburgh University Press. ISBN 978-0-7486-4696-8.
- Sanders, Andrew (2019). The Long Peace Process: The United States of America and Northern Ireland, 1960-2008. Liverpool University Press. ISBN 978-1-78694-044-5.
- Shanahan, Timothy (2008). The Provisional Irish Republican Army and the Morality of Terrorism. Edinburgh University Press. ISBN 978-0748635306.
- Sheehy, Kevin (2008). More Questions Than Answers: Reflections on a Life in the RUC. Gill & Macmillan. ISBN 978-0717143962.
- Sinclair, Samuel Justin; Antonius, Daniel (2013). The Political Psychology of Terrorism. Oxford University Press. ISBN 978-0199925926.
- Smith, M.L.R. (1995). Fighting for Ireland: The Military Strategy of the Irish Republican Movement. Routledge. ISBN 978-0415091619.
- Sutton, Malcolm. "Sutton Index of Deaths: Crosstabulations (two-way tables)". Conflict Archive on the Internet.
- Sutton, Malcolm. "Sutton Index of Deaths: Organisation responsible for the death". Conflict Archive on the Internet.
- Sutton, Malcolm. "Revised and Updated Extracts from Sutton's Book". Conflict Archive on the Internet.
- Sutton, Malcolm. "Sutton Index of Deaths: Select and Crosstabulations". Conflict Archive on the Internet.
- Sutton, Malcolm. "Sutton Index of Deaths: Status of the person killed". Conflict Archive on the Internet.
- Taylor, Peter (1993). States of Terror. BBC. ISBN 0-563-36774-1.
- Taylor, Peter (1998). Provos The IRA & Sinn Féin. Bloomsbury Publishing. ISBN 0-7475-3818-2.
- Taylor, Peter (2001). Brits. Bloomsbury Publishing. ISBN 978-0-7475-5806-4.
- Tonge, Johnathan (2001). Northern Ireland: Conflict and Change. Routledge. ISBN 978-0582424005.
- Tonge, Johnathan; Murray, Gerard (2005). Sinn Féin and the SDLP: From Alienation to Participation. C. Hurst & Co. ISBN 978-1-85065-649-4.
- Weitzer, Ronald John (1995). Policing Under Fire: Ethnic Conflict and Police-Community Relations in Northern Ireland. State University of New York Press. ISBN 079142247X.
- White, Robert (1993). Provisional Irish Republicans: An Oral and Interpretive History. Praeger Publishing. ISBN 978-0313285646.
- White, Robert (1997). "The Irish Republican Army: An assessment of sectarianism". Terrorism and Political Violence. 9 (1): 20–55. doi:10.1080/09546559708427385.
- White, Robert (2006). Ruairí Ó Brádaigh: The Life and Politics of an Irish Revolutionary. Indiana University Press. ISBN 978-0253347084.
- White, Robert (2017). Out of the Ashes: An Oral History of the Provisional Irish Republican Movement. Merrion Press. ISBN 9781785370939.
- Wilson, Steve; Rutherford, Helen; Storey, Tony; Wortley, Natalie; Kotecha, Birju (2020). English Legal System. Oxford University Press. ISBN 978-0198853800.
