= John Horgan (psychologist) =

Irish political psychologist and terrorism expert

John G. Horgan
- Born: 1974 (age 51–52); Castleisland, County Kerry, Ireland
- Known for: Expert on the psychology of terrorism

Academic background
- Education: University College Cork

Academic work
- Discipline: Psychology
- Sub-discipline: Political psychology; forensic psychology; forensic psychopathology
- Institutions: Georgia State University; University of Massachusetts Lowell; Pennsylvania State University; University of St Andrews; University College Cork
- Main interests: Terrorism; political violence; violent extremism; fanaticism; violence prevention; pathways to violence
- Website: terroristbehavior.com

John G. Horgan (born 1974) is a Distinguished University Professor of Psychology at Georgia State University in Atlanta, Georgia. He studies involvement and engagement with terrorism, with a focus on disengagement and deradicalisation from terrorist movements. He has been described by the European Eye on Radicalization research group as the "world’s most distinguished expert in the psychology of terrorism". Since 2019, Horgan has been leading a team of researchers funded by the U.S. Department of Homeland Security to research the incel subculture.

== Life and education ==
Horgan is a native of Castleisland, County Kerry, Ireland. Horgan was awarded his Ph.D. in applied psychology in 2000 by University College Cork. While in Ireland, he spent several years conducting detailed research on Irish Republican movements, and published several articles on the fundraising activities of the Provisional Irish Republican Army.

== Research and teaching ==
Horgan is a Distinguished University Professor of Psychology at Georgia State University, where he leads the Violent Extremism Research Group. He has previously held positions at the University of Massachusetts Lowell, Pennsylvania State University, and the University of St Andrews. While at the University of Massachusetts, Lowell he directed their Center for Terrorism & Security Studies; while at Pennsylvania State University, he directed for their International Center for the Study of Terrorism.

In 2006, Horgan became a recipient of an Airey Neave Trust Fellowship Award, and he has since been awarded multiple grants for his research on terrorist behaviour. In 2010, following his consultancy work with the FBI's Behavioral Analysis Unit (BAU), he was appointed to the Research Advisory Board of the FBI's National Center for the Analysis of Violent Crime (NCAVC) until its official disbandment in 2012. In August 2012 he became a member of the new NCAVC Research Working Group.

In 2019, Horgan and a group of researchers at Georgia State University were awarded $250,000 by the U.S. Department of Homeland Security to research the growth and spread of the incel subculture, a group that Horgan described as "one of the purest hotbeds of Internet radicalisation I’ve ever seen".

== Writing and editing ==
Horgan has extensively researched involvement and engagement in terrorism. Some of his research on this subject was published in the journals Terrorism and Political Violence, Studies in Conflict & Terrorism, The Georgetown Journal of International Affairs, and Dynamics of Asymmetric Conflict. Horgan has written several books on terrorism, including The Psychology of Terrorism (2005 and 2014), Divided We Stand: The Strategy and Psychology of Ireland's Dissident Terrorists (2012), and The Future of Terrorism (1999, with Max Taylor). Horgan is editor of the journal Terrorism and Political Violence. He serves on the editorial boards of several journals including Studies in Conflict & Terrorism, Journal of Strategic Security, and Legal and Criminological Psychology.

=== Books ===
- Horgan, J. (2014). The Psychology of Terrorism, 2nd Edition. London: Routledge.
- Horgan, J. (2013). Divided We Stand: The Psychology and Strategy of Ireland's Dissident Terrorists. New York: Oxford University Press.
- Horgan, J. and Braddock, K. (2011)Terrorism: A Reader. London and New York: Routledge.
- Horgan, J. (2009). Walking Away from Terrorism: Accounts of Disengagement from Radical and Extremist Movements. London and New York: Routledge.
- Bjorgo, T. and Horgan, J. (Eds.) (2009). Leaving Terrorism Behind: Individual and Collective Disengagement. London: Routledge.
- Horgan, J. (2005). Psychology of Terrorism. London: Routledge.
- Taylor, M. and Horgan, J. (Eds.) (2000). The Future of Terrorism. London: Frank Cass & Co.
