= Terrorism and Political Violence =

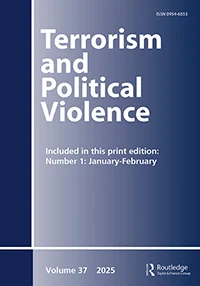
- Discipline: Political science
- Language: English
- Edited by: James J.F. Forest

Publication details
- Former name: Journal of Terrorism Research
- History: 1989–present
- Publisher: Routledge
- Frequency: 5/year
- Impact factor: 1.792 (2018)

Standard abbreviations
- ISO 4: Terror. Political Violence

Indexing
- ISSN: 0954-6553 (print); 1556-1836 (web)
- LCCN: 93642626
- OCLC no.: 54832927

Links
- Journal homepage; Online access; Online archive

Terrorism and Political Violence is a peer-reviewed academic journal covering terrorism and counter-terrorism published by Routledge. It was established in 1989 by David C. Rapoport (University of California, Los Angeles), who was its first editor-in-chief. In the editorial manifesto in its first issue, it is referred to as the Journal of Terrorism Research; however, from its first issue until the present, in editorial statements and elsewhere, it is only ever cited as Terrorism and Political Violence.

Several internationally renowned scholars in the field have served as editor-in-chief, including Paul Wilkinson, David Rapoport and John Horgan. Alex P. Schmid was co-editor of the journal until 2009, and remains on the editorial board. As of January 2025, the Editor-in-Chief is James J.F. Forest, and Co-Editors include Max Taylor, Michele Grossman AM, Beatrice A. de Graaf and Orla Lynch.

== Abstracting and indexing ==
The journal is abstracted and indexed in:

- America: History & Life
- Current Contents/Social & Behavioral Sciences
- Historical Abstracts
- International Bibliography of Periodical Literature
- International Bibliography of the Social Sciences
- International Political Science Abstracts
- ProQuest databases
- PsycINFO/Psychological Abstracts
- Scopus
- Social Sciences Citation Index

According to Thomson Reuters Journal Citation Reports, the journal has a 2018 impact factor of 1.792.
