= James J. F. Forest =

American author and a professor

James J. F. Forest is an American author and a professor at the University of Massachusetts Lowell (UMass Lowell).

== Biography ==
Forest was born and raised in Idaho, attended high school and community college in California, and earned degrees from Georgetown University, Stanford University and Boston College. He co-founded the Center for Terrorism and Security Studies (CTSS) at UMass Lowell in 2013 and served as its Director from 2015 to 2016.

He is also a visiting professor at the Fletcher School of Law and Diplomacy. He is the former director of Terrorism Studies at the United States Military Academy in the Combating Terrorism Center at West Point, and a former senior fellow at the U.S. Joint Special Operations University.

Dr. Forest is the Editor-in-Chief of the journal Terrorism & Political Violence.

He has been cited as a terrorism expert by dozens of news outlets including CNN, CBS, The Globe Post, CNBC, and the Christian Science Monitor,.

== Selected publications ==
=== Books ===
- Digital Influence Warfare in the Age of Social Media ABC-CLIO/Praeger (2021) ISBN 9781440870095
- The Terrorism Lectures Nortia Press (2012, 2015, 2019) ISBN 9780984225293
- Essentials of Counterterrorism Praeger (2015) ISBN 9781440834707
- Intersections of Crime and Terrorism Routledge (2013) ISBN 9781138945753
- Countering the Terrorism Threat of Boko Haram in Nigeria JSOU Press (2012) ISBN 9781933749709
- Weapons of Mass Destruction and Terrorism (2nd Edition) McGraw-Hill (2011) ISBN 9780078026225
- Influence Warfare: How Terrorists and Governments Fight to Shape Perceptions in a War of Ideas Praeger (2009) ISBN 978-0313347313
- Handbook of Defence Politics: International and Comparative Perspectives Routledge (2008) ISBN 9781857434439
- Countering Terrorism and Insurgency in the 21st Century: International Perspectives Praeger (2007) ISBN 978-0275990343
- Homeland Security: Public spaces and social institutions Praeger (2006) ISBN 978-0275987701
- Teaching Terror: Strategic and tactical learning in the terrorist world Rowman & Littlefield (2005) ISBN 978-0742540774

=== Articles and other publications ===
- “Israel has no good options for dealing with Hamas’ hostage-taking in Gaza,” The Conversation (October 11, 2023).
- “The Evolution of Islamist Terrorism in the 20th Century” in The Routledge Handbook of U.S. Counterterrorism and Irregular Warfare Operations, edited by Michael A. Sheehan, Erich Marquardt, and Liam Collins] (London: Routledge, 2021).
- “Political Warfare and Propaganda,” Journal of Advanced Military Studies vol. 12, no. 1 (Spring 2021).
- “Prevention of Public Panic in the Wake of Terrorist Incidents” (w/Juan Merizalde and John Colautti) in The Handbook of Terrorism Prevention and Preparedness, edited by Alex P. Schmid (The Hague: ICCT Press, 2021).
- “Tracking Terrorism: The Role of Technology in Risk Assessment and Monitoring of Terrorist Offenders” (w/Neil Shortland), in Science Informed Policing, edited by Bryanna Fox, Joan A. Reid and Anthony J. Masys (London: Springer, 2020).
- “Crime-Terror Interactions in Sub-Saharan Africa,” Studies in Conflict and Terrorism (Oct. 2019).
- “150 Un- and Under-Researched Topics and Themes in the Field of (Counter-) Terrorism Studies,” Perspectives on Terrorism Vol. 12, No. 4 (August 2018)
- “Why do Ethnopolitical Organizations Turn to Crime?” (with Victor Asal and Brian Nussbaum) Global Crime 16, no. 4.
- “Behavioral Patterns among (Violent) Non-State Actors: A Study of Complementary Governance” (with Annette I. Idler). Stability: International Journal of Security and Development 4(1): 2 (January 2015).
- U.S. Military Deployments to Africa: Lessons from the Hunt for Joseph Kony and the Lord’s Resistance Army. Tampa, FL: JSOU Press.
- Countering the al-Shabaab Insurgency in Somalia: Lessons for U.S. Special Operations Forces (with Joshua Meservey and Graham Turbiville). Tampa, FL: JSOU Press.
- "A Framework for Analyzing the Future Threat of WMD Terrorism," Journal of Strategic Security (Winter 2012)
- "Perception Challenges Faced by Al-Qaeda on the Battlefield of Influence Warfare," Perspectives on Terrorism (April 2012)
- “Ungoverned Territories: Engaging Local Nongovernmental Entities in U.S. Security Strategy,” Atlantic Perspective (July 2011)
- Harmony and Disharmony: Exploiting al-Qa'ida’s Organizational Vulnerabilities (with Joe Felter, Jarret Brachman et al.). West Point, NY: Combating Terrorism Center, United States Military Academy (February 14, 2006).
