= Brendan O'Brien (journalist) =

Irish journalist (1943/1944–2026)

Brendan O'Brien (1943 or 1944 – 4 May 2026) was an Irish journalist on RTÉ One's Prime Time current affairs programme; he worked for RTÉ from 1974 until 2002.

== Life and career ==
O'Brien was a graduate of Trinity College Dublin, and the University of Ulster.

In 1983, O'Brien won a Jacob's Award for his reporting on the RTÉ current affairs programme, Today Tonight.

He is noted for his report and investigation of Martin Cahill where he followed said criminal and confronts him in the street.

In 2008, O'Brien won the Irish Children's Book of the Year Award for The Story of Ireland. He also wrote about the history of the IRA.

He worked from 2005 until 2010 for the independent radio station Newstalk presenting The Saturday Edition.

O'Brien died on 4 May 2026, at the age of 82.
