= Andy Oppenheimer =

British consultant

Andy Oppenheimer AIExpE MIABTI
- Born: 1953 (age 72–73)
- Education: Liverpool University

Andy Oppenheimer AIExpE MIABTI (born 1953) is a UK-based expert and consultant in counter-terrorism and CBRNE (chemical, biological, radiological, nuclear weapons and explosives), and is a singer/songwriter of electro-pop music.

He has been editor of several journals on defence and security, including Chemical, Biological & Nuclear Warfare (CBNW; 2009–2022), Jane's Nuclear, Biological and Chemical Defence and NBC International from 2006 to 2008, and was co-editor of Jane's World Armies from 2002 to 2004. He was also editor of Energy World, 1990–1992. He has served as a CBRN consultant for Jane's Consultancy Group and Oxford Analytica.

Andy pictured outside the world-famous Berghain Club in Berlin, where he played at Säule Berghain as Oppenheimer MkII in August 2026. Photo courtesy Pietro Anton T2 Pictures, Berlin

== Personal life ==
Born in 1953, Oppenheimer grew up in Leeds and Liverpool and graduated from Liverpool University in 1974. He then moved to London and worked in popular science and publishing, most notably for the futuristic US science and sci-fi magazine Omni, and for publishers of books on space exploration and astronomy. He became an author and subject matter expert in defence and counterterrorism in 2001 and is now semi-retired. He became a Company Director on the board of Viceroy Lodge FL Ltd in 2026. He has been a singer/songwriter of electro pop music since 1982. He became an Irish citizen in 2020.

== Professional career ==
During the 1980s and 1990s, Oppenheimer conducted research into nuclear weapons and terrorism, along with research into the Irish Republican Army and improvised explosive devices. He became a Member of the International Association of Bomb Technicians (IABTI) in 2008 and an Associate Member of the UK Institute of Explosives Engineers in 2011.

From 2012 to 2015 he was a Course Contributor to the University of St. Andrews Certificate of Terrorism Studies, conducted by the Centre for the Study of Terrorism and Political Violence, writing the CBRN Weapons in Terrorism Course Module in 2012 and the IEDs: Threats & Countermeasures Course Module in 2013. He has written for defence journals including Military Technology, CBNW, RUSI Journal, Strategic Intelligence Review, Counter-IED Report, Langley Intelligence Group Network, Police Oracle, Explosives Engineering, and several Jane's Information Group (now Jane's IHS) publications from 2002 to 2006, including Jane's Terrorism & Security Monitor and Jane's Intelligence Digest. He was Editor of Jane's Nuclear, Biological and Chemical Defence from 2006 to 2008.

Andy has made TV appearances and radio broadcasts as an expert on terrorism and CBRNE and as a consultant for films and documentaries, including Mountbatten: Death of a Royal (History Channel, RTE), Gaddafi and the IRA (ITV), The World's Deadliest Arms Race (ITV), Terror Attacks That Shocked Britain (Current TV, Sky), and Spooks (BBC1).

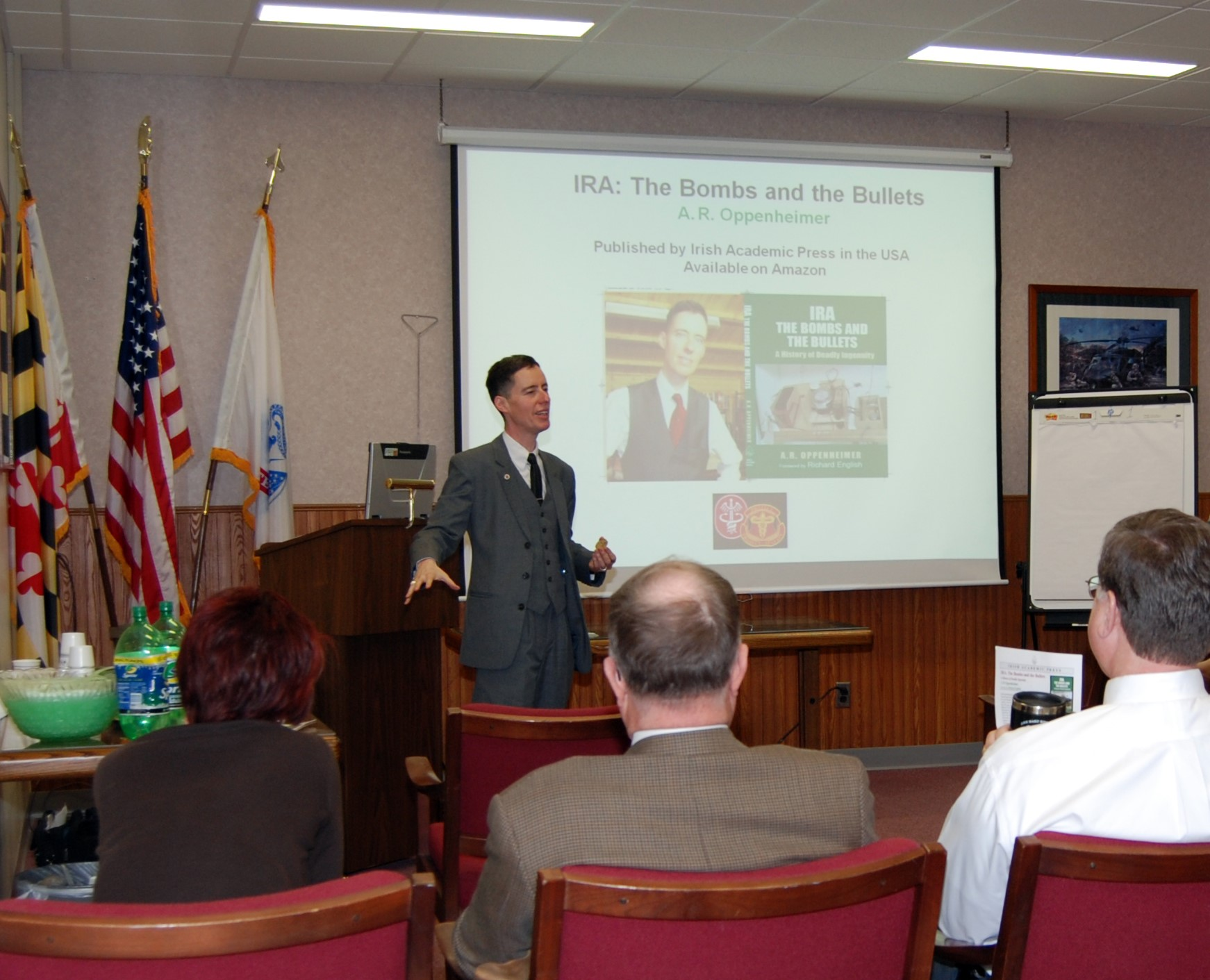
Andy Oppenheimer lecturing at a United States Army Medical Materiel Agency (USAMMA) seminar at Fort Detrick, MA in 2009.

== Published work ==
His first book IRA: The Bombs and the Bullets – A History of Deadly Ingenuity was published in 2008. It analyses the IRA's mission, doctrine, targeting, and acquisition of weapons and explosives.

He has since published three science-fiction novels on Amazon: Fields of Orion (I): An Odyssey (2019); Fields of Orion (II) The Mission (2020); and Orion: The Hunter's Story (2024).

In 2021 he published Stars of Orion: An Astronomy Special: a collection of photos and stories of the Constellation Orion by 45 amateur and professional astronomers.

== Music ==
Andy Oppenheimer is also a singer-songwriter of electronic pop music since the early 1980s, when he formed Oppenheimer Analysis (OA) with producer Martin Lloyd (aka Analysis, d. 2013). They released the tape-only album New Mexico in 1982.

In 2006 OA re-formed and an EP of early material, Oppenheimer Analysis, was the first release by the New York-based Minimal Wave label, with a release of the 1982 New Mexico album. The Oppenheimer Analysis EP entered its sixth re-pressing in 2026 and is regarded as a pioneering synth-pop classic release. From 2006 to 2013, OA played live in Germany, Belgium, and London.

Oppenheimer also wrote and sang from 2010 to 2015 as Touching the Void with veteran producer Mark Warner (of Rossetti's Compass and formerly of the 1980s band Sudeten Creche) and released an album, Love, Longing and Loss in 2015.

He continues to create songs as Oppenheimer MkII with producer Mahk Rumbae (of experimental electronic bands Mitra Mitra and Codex Futura). Oppenheimer MkII released their first album The Presence of the Abnormal in 2012, which was re-released on vinyl in 2023 on German label Minimalkombinat, and an EP, Out in the Field, on Northern Irish record label TONN Recordings in 2021.

Performing live as Oppenheimer MkII at Kult club, Helsinki, in May 2026. Photo Lauri Soini

In 2026, Oppenheimer MkII's second album, Embrace the Dark, was released by Wave Tension Records on vinyl and on Bandcamp. As the title suggests, the album's songs embrace dark, apocalyptic themes and it focuses on Andy's lifelong obsession with space.

He has played live as Oppenheimer MkII at music festivals in Germany and Poland and at clubs in Berlin, Barcelona, Helsinki, Vienna and London. In 2023, also released by TONN Recordings, Oppenheimer produced an album continuing the Orion theme, Songs From A Constellation, in collaboration with Northern Irish electro musician and producer Crystalline Stricture. His main pastimes are comedy writing and astronomy.

== Books ==
- 2008: IRA: The Bombs and the Bullets
- 2019: Fields of Orion: An Odyssey
- 2020: Fields of Orion (II) The Mission
- 2021: The Hunter's Story by Orion
- 2021: Stars of Orion: An Astronomy Special
- 2024: Orion: The Hunter's Story

== Discography ==
=== Albums ===
- 1982: New Mexico as Oppenheimer Analysis
- 2013: The Presence of the Abnormal as Oppenheimer MkII
- 2015: Love, Longing and Loss as Touching the Void
- 2023: Songs From a Constellation with Crystalline Stricture
- 2026: Embrace the Dark as Oppenheimer MkII

=== EPs ===
- 2005: Der Wissenschaftler as Oppenheimer Analysis
- 2005: Oppenheimer Analysis as Oppenheimer Analysis
- 2015: Line of Sight EP as Oppenheimer MkII

=== Singles ===
- 2010: Oppenheimer Analysis as Oppenheimer Analysis
- 2011: Science/Washington as Oppenheimer Analysis
- 2012: Parallel Lives as Touching the Void
- 2014: Obsession / In this Together as Touching the Void
- 2021: Out in the Field as Oppenheimer MkII
