= Max Taylor (psychologist) =

Maxwell "Max" Taylor (born 19 April 1945) is a British criminal and legal psychologist. His early work specialised in the study of terrorism but he also became involved in the study of sex offenders, and in the development of capacity building activities for disadvantaged children in conflict zones, returning later to the study of terrorism.

== Life and career ==
After earlier appointments in Wales, Canada and Northern Ireland, he was appointed Professor and Head of the Department of Applied Psychology, at University College Cork a post he held from 1983 to 2005. In 2005, Taylor became Professor of International Relations and Director of E-Learning at the Centre for the Study of Terrorism and Political Violence University of St Andrews, where he subsequently became Director in 2009. He retired from this post in 2012. He is currently visiting professor in the Department of Security and Crime Sciences, University College, London.

In the period 1993 to 2004, Taylor developed the Child Studies Unit. This Unit grew out of work in Khartoum, Sudan, and later had technical offices in Addis Ababa, Ethiopia, Kigali, Rwanda, and during the Balkans War in Sarajevo (subsequently moving to Zenica). From 1994 to 1996 he was a consultant to the UNICEF Special Representative to the Former Yugoslavia. The Child Studies Unit was primarily concerned with capacity building for disadvantaged children living in conflict zones.

In 1998, Taylor formed the COPINE Project ("Combating Paedophile Information Networks in Europe"): this was an EU funded research initiative which was originally developed in co-operation with the Paedophile Unit of the London Metropolitan Police. As part of the Project work, with colleagues he helped to develop the COPINE scale. The COPINE Scale is a typology to categorise child abuse images for use in both research and law enforcement. The COPINE Scale formed the basis of the UK Sentencing Advisory Commission sentencing guidelines on conviction of offenders. The ten-level typology was based on analysis of images available on websites and internet newsgroups. Other researchers developed similar ten-level scales.

In St. Andrews Taylor developed innovative elearning programmes in Terrorism Studies (Certificate in Terrorism Studies, and Diploma and M.Litt. in Terrorism Studies). This built on and extended Taylor's work in developing the elearning undergraduate and graduate programmes in Information Technology offered by the National Distance Education Centre, Dublin where Taylor was Course Leader for the Social and Behavioural Sciences stream. A characteristic of the Terrorism Studies programmes was their focus on integration of theory with practise.

For most of his academic career, Taylor has been concerned with the problems of applying psychology to real life problems. In part this has involved the development and use of psychological insights in new untested situations, but there has also been a consistent thread of concern with integrating theory with practice in areas of existing practice. He was one of the first investigators exploring psychological factors in the development of terrorism, and in exploring links between situational crime analysis and terrorist behaviour. His work has been grounded in his background in behaviour analysis, but his recent work has engaged with ecological and environmental factors. Recent research relates to terrorism and the Internet. He is currently editor of the journal Terrorism and Political Violence and is also editor of the 'New Directions in Terrorism Studies Series' (with Currie, P.M. and Horgan, J.) published by Bloomsbury Press.

== Selected publications ==
=== Podcast ===
- Combatting Jihadist Terror. A podcast based on Chapter Eleven: Psychological Dimensions of Terrorism in 'Jihadist Terror: New Threats, New Responses' https://www.cojit.org/podcast/08-max-taylor/
- Ethics Issues up close. Podcast interview with Boaz Ganor about his paper 'Targeted Killings: Ethical and Operational Dilemmas' published in Terrorism and Political Violence, Special Issue 'Terrorism and Ethics'. https://open.spotify.com/episode/4y2wZRgJ9BLMEHkTx5Ib3D?si=3bl6qG2VQh6qt4Ii7Z8MOQ&dl_branch=1&nd=1
- Issues up close. Podcast interview 'One year after the Capital siege'. A conversation moderated by George Michael which explores the work of Richard Jensen, Max Taylor and Jeffrey Kaplan. Based on the Terrorism and Political Violence special issue "6 January Forum", Terrorism and Political Violence, 2021, 33:5, 907–911, (DOI: 10.1080/09546553.2021.1932337) https://open.spotify.com/episode/5VgbCzhYxqEXSsYnDChN98?si=15ba52093b4d44ef&nd=1

=== Books ===
- Taylor, M., Horgan J. (2021) "Ethics and Terrorism." Routledge, ISBN 978-1-032-12065-2
- Taylor, M., Roach, J., Pease, K. (2015) "Evolutionary Psychology and Terrorism." Routledge, ISBN 978-1138774582
- Taylor, M., Holbrook, D., Currie, PM (2013) Extreme Right Wing Political Violence and Terrorism. Continuum Press, ISBN 9781441151629
- Taylor, M, Currie, PM (2012) Terrorism and Affordance Continuum Press, ISBN 9781441133816
- Currie PM, Taylor M (2011). Dissident Irish Republicanism. Continuum Press, ISBN 978-1-4411-5467-5
- Quayle E, Erooga M, Wright L, Taylor M, Harbinson D (2006). Only Pictures? Therapeutic work with Internet sex offenders. Russell House Publishing, ISBN 978-1-903855-68-3
- Quayle E, Taylor M, eds. (2005). Viewing child pornography on the Internet. Understanding the offence, managing the offender, helping the victims. Russell House Publishing, ISBN 978-1-903855-69-0
- Taylor M, Quayle E (2003). Child Pornography: An Internet Crime. Routledge, ISBN 978-1-58391-244-7
- Taylor M, Horgan J (2000). The Future of Terrorism. Cass series on political violence, Routledge ISBN 978-0-7146-8090-3
- Taylor M, Quayle E (1994). Terrorist Lives. Brassey's, Ltd., ISBN 978-0-08-041327-3
- Taylor M (1991). The Fanatics. A Behavioural approach to political violence. Brassey's, ISBN 978-0-08-036274-8
- Taylor M (1988). The Terrorist. Brassey's Defence Publishers, ISBN 978-0-08-033602-2

=== Papers ===
- Some Preliminary Thoughts Prompted by President Trump's 6 January Speech: Words, Enemies, Affordances. In "6 January Forum", Terrorism and Political Violence, 2021, 33:5, 907–911, DOI: 10.1080/09546553.2021.1932337
- Primum non Nocere: First do no harm. In "Special Issue on Terrorism and Ethics" Taylor, M. and Horgan, J. (Eds) Terrorism and Political Violence, 2021 https://doi.org/10.1080/09546553.2021.1880239
- Psychological Dimensions of Terrorism. In "Jihadi Terrorism: New Threats New Responses" Richards, A. (Ed.) Bloomsbury Publishing, 2019.
- Criminogenic qualities of the Internet. Dynamics of Asymmetric Conflict, 2015, 8 (2), pp 97–106
- Evolutionary Psychology, Terrorism and Terrorist Behaviour. In "Evolutionary Psychology and Terrorism." Taylor, M., Roach, J., Pease, K. (Eds) Taylor and Frances, 2015
- National Interest and Strategy: an ecologically grounded analysis. In Edmunds, T., Gaskarth, J. and Porter, R. (Eds.) British Foreign Policy and National Interest: Identity, Strategy and Security. Palgrave Macmillan, 2014
- If I Were You, I Wouldn't Start From Here: Response to Marc Sageman's “The Stagnation in Terrorism Research” Taylor, M. Terrorism and Political Violence, 2014, DOI: 10.1080/09546553.2014.895650
- Developing grading processes for ideological content. Holbrook, D. and Taylor, M. Journal of Policing, Intelligence and Counter Terrorism, 2014, 9, (1), 32–47
- Terroristic Content: Towards a Grading Scale. Holbrook, D., Ramsay, G., Taylor, M. Terrorism and Political Violence, 2013, 25, issue 2, pp. 202–223.
- Terrorism. in Graham Davies and Anthony Beech (Eds) Forensic Psychology. Crime, Justice, Law, Intervention. 2nd Edition. BPsS and John Wiley, 2012.
- Radicalisation and Internet propaganda by Dissident Republican Groups in Northern Ireland since 2008. Nalton, J, Ramsey, G and Taylor, M. In Dissident Irish Republicanism. Currie, P.M. and Taylor, M. (Eds) New York: Continuum Press, 2011.
- Disengagement, De-radicalization and the Arc of Terrorism: Future Directions for Research, Horgan, J. and Taylor, M. in Rik Coolsaet (Ed.) Jihadi Terrorism and the Radicalization Challenge. London: Ashgate. 2011
- Social Networking as a nexus for engagement and exploitation of young people. Quayle, E., Taylor, M. Information Security Technical Report 2011, 16, 44–50
- Introduction. In Dissident Irish Republicanism. Currie, P.M. and Taylor, M. (Eds) New York: Continuum Press, 2011.
- New Labour, Defence and the ‘War on Terror’. In Gaskarth, J. and Daddow, O. In British Foreign Policy: The New Labour Years, Palgrave Macmillan, 2011
- Is Terrorism a Group Phenomenon? Aggression and Violent Behavior, 15 (2010), 121–129
- Financial Intelligence: A price worth paying? Parker, M. and Taylor, M. Studies in Conflict and Terrorism, 33, (2010), 949–959
- Violent Radical Content and the Relationship between Ideology and Behaviour: Do Counter-Narratives Matter? Taylor, M. & Ramsay, G. In National Coordingator for Counter Terrorism, Countering Violent Extremist Narratives. The Hague, Netherlands, Jan 2010
- Somalia and the Horn of Africa. In A.P. Schmid and G.F. Hindle After the War on Terror: Regional and Multilateral Perspectives on Counter-Terrorism Strategy. RUSI Books, London. 2009
- Criminogenic qualities of the Internet in the collection and distribution of abuse images of children. Taylor, M. and Quayle, E. In J. McCarthy, E. Quayle, S. Aylwin and F. Lyddy. Applying Psychology: A feitschrift for Dr Elizabeth A. Dunne. Irish Journal of Psychology, 2008, 29, 119–130
- Mad, Bad or Freedom Fighters: The new challenges of terrorism. In Sharpe, M. (Ed) Suicide Bombers: The Psychological, Religious and Other Imperatives. NATO Science for Peace Programme. IOS Press, Amsterdam. 2008
- A Conceptual Framework for Addressing Psychological Process In The Development of The Terrorist. Taylor, M. and Horgan, J. Terrorism and Political Violence, 2006, 18:585–601
- Taylor, M. and Elbushra, M.Hassan al-Turabi, Osama bin Laden and al Qaeda in Sudan. Terrorism and Political Violence, 2006, 18:3 pp449–64
- Horgan, J. and Taylor, M. "Insurgency in Ireland: A preliminary analysis of the Provisional IRA ceasefire – 1994–1996", in Albrecht Schnabel and Rohan Gunaratna, Understanding and Managing Insurgent Movements, Singapore: Marshall Cavendish International, 2006, pp. 124–152.
- The Internet and abuse images of children; search, precriminal situations and opportunity. Taylor, M. and Quayle, E. In Wortley, R. and Smallbone, S. (Eds) ‘Situational perspectives of Sexual Offences against Children’ Crime Prevention Studies Series (jointly published by Criminal Justice Press (US) and Willan Publishing (UK). 2006
- Sex offenders, Internet child abuse images and emotional avoidance: The importance of values. Quayle, E., Vaughan, M. and Taylor, M. (2005) Aggression and Violent Behavior, 11, 1–11
- A Cognitive Behavioural Model of Problematic Internet Use in People with a Sexual Interest in Children. E.Quayle and M. Taylor. CyberPsychology and Behaviour, 2003, 6, 93–106
- Child pornography and the Internet: Perpetuating a cycle of abuse E. Quayle and M. Taylor. Deviant Behaviour, 2002, 23, 331–362
- Paedophiles, Pornography and the Internet: Assessment Issues E.Quayle and M. Taylor. British Journal of Social Work, 2002, 32, 863–875
- Typology of Paedophile Picture Collections. (with Holland G. and Quayle E.) Police Journal, 2001, 71, 97–107
- Child seduction and self-representation on the Internet: A case study E.Quayle and M. Taylor. CyberPsychology and Behavior, 2001, 4 (5), 597–608
- The Psychological and Behavioural bases of Islamic Fundamentalism. Taylor, M. and Horgan, J. Terrorism and Political Violence, 2001, 13, 37–71
- Examining Burglar's Target Selection: Interview, Experiment or Enthnomethodology? Nee, C. and Taylor, M. Psychology, Crime and Law, 2000, 6, 45–59
- Future developments of terrorism in Europe. (with Horgan, J.) Terrorism and Political Violence, 1999, 11, 83–93
- Towards a psychology of surveillance. (with Horgan J. and Sarma, K.) The Police Journal April 1999, 161–167
- Playing the green card: financing the Provisional IRA – Part 1. (with Horgan, J.) Terrorism and Political Violence, 1999, 11, 1–38
- The Provisional Irish Republican Army: Command and Functional Structure. (with J. Horgan) Terrorism and Political Violence, 1997, 9, 1–32
- Issues in Terrorism Research (with Hogan, J.) The Police Journal, Vol. LXX, July–September 1997, 3, 193–202
- Proceedings of the Irish Republican Army general army convention December 1969'(with Hogan, J.) Terrorism and Political Violence, 1997, 9, 151–158
- Resurgence of a Terrorist Organisation: Part 1: The UDA, a case study. Taylor, M. and Cusack, J. Terrorism and Political Violence 1993, 5, 1–27
- Rational Choice, Behaviour Analysis and Political Violence. In Routine Activity and Rational Choice – Advances in Criminological Theory. Clarke, R.V. and Felson, M. (Eds) Transaction Press: Rutgers, New Jersey. 1992
