= Dessie Grew =

Irish Republican (1953–1990)

Desmond Grew
- Dessie Grew on an unknown date
- Born: 14 September 1953; Blundells Grange, County Armagh, Northern Ireland
- Died: 9 October 1990 (aged 37); Lislasley, Loughgall, County Armagh, Northern Ireland
- Cause of death: Shot during an ambush by the Special Air Service
- Burial place: Armagh City Cemetery
- Military career
- Paramilitaries: Provisional Irish Republican Army (1972–1975; 1988–1990); Irish National Liberation Army (1975–1984)
- Rank: Volunteer (Provisional IRA); Officer Commanding (INLA)
- Nickname: Dessie
- Units: East Tyrone Brigade (Provisional IRA); Armagh Brigade (INLA)
- Conflicts: The Troubles

Desmond "Dessie" Grew (14 September 1953 – 9 October 1990) was a volunteer in the East Tyrone Brigade of the Provisional Irish Republican Army (IRA). Grew was killed by undercover Special Air Service soldiers in County Armagh in 1990 along with fellow IRA volunteer, Martin McCaughey who was also a Sinn Féin councillor.

== Background ==
Grew was the second eldest in a family of seven girls and four boys born to Kathleen and Patrick Grew. He was educated at primary level at Knockaconey Primary School and at secondary level at his local Christian Brothers School (CBS), where he obtained the highest grades at both "O" and "A" levels. Grew was deeply interested in Irish culture: he spoke the Irish language fluently and represented both his school and local parish Gaelic football teams.

The Grews originally lived in a predominantly Ulster loyalist area and their family home was attacked on a number of occasions. It was eventually burnt down in 1972. The Grew family then moved to the outskirts of Charlemont, County Armagh, a village southeast of Moy, where again the home was burnt down as a result of a bomb attack in which six of the Grew children were injured.

== Paramilitary career ==
During his adult life Dessie Grew was a highly active member of the Irish National Liberation Army and the IRA. He had joined the Provisional IRA in 1972, and later was a founding member of both the IRSP and INLA in Armagh in 1975. Grew had also been the Officer Commanding for the Armagh Brigade of the INLA.

In May 1976, Grew was one of ten INLA members to carry out a prison escape from compound 5 in The Maze, however he returned to the compound after injuring his leg during the escape. He was later released in 1978. Grew was convicted for a 1980 INLA robbery in Kells, County Meath, after his fingerprints were found on the license plate of the getaway car. Following a confidence crisis resulting out of recent INLA activities in Derry and Kilkeel, Grew was one of several members to cut ties with the INLA in late 1984, moving to the Provisional IRA landing in Portlaoise prison. Although he moved to their landing, Grew did not actually join the Provisional IRA until his release in 1988.

An arrest warrant for Grew had been issued by German police on suspicion of the murder of RAF communications operative Corporal Maheshkumar 'Mick' Islania and his six month old daughter, Nivruti Islania, in West Germany in 1989.

Shortly after midnight on 9 October 1990, Grew was shot dead along with Martin McCaughey in Lislasley townland (near Moy) in an operation by undercover British soldiers. The British Army's 14 Intelligence Company, which was a secret undercover intelligence unit, also known as the DET, were monitoring three AK47s at a farm building in this rural part of County Armagh and were aware that Grew and McCaughey were due to remove the guns. As the pair exited an agricultural shed which was being used to grow mushrooms and also thought to have been an IRA arms dump, as many as 200 shots are believed to have been fired at them by members of the Special Air Service, who had been lying in wait for several hours. According to the soldiers, they witnessed through their night vision goggles Grew and McCaughey emerge from the mushroom shed wearing balaclavas with their AK-47 rifles held in "at the ready" positions. Asserting the belief that noise from their tactical radios had alerted the two men to their presence, the soldiers claimed to have no choice but to open fire without shouting a warning to surrender first. Autopsy results showed Grew had 48 bullet wounds and McCaughey 12 bullet wounds. Although official British Army reports of the shooting stated that the two men left the shed holding two rifles, Republican sources state the men were unarmed at the time they were shot.

His brother Seamus Grew had also been killed in disputed circumstances by an undercover E4A squad on the outskirts of Armagh in 1982. Grew had stated weeks before his death that in the event of his death that he wished to be laid beside Seamus. In line with his wishes, Grew was buried at Armagh City cemetery in October 1990. Gerry Adams gave the oration at his funeral, calling him "a freedom fighter, a patriot and a decent upstanding Irish citizen".

== Aftermath ==
The family of McCaughey claimed that Grew and McCaughey were ambushed after a stakeout by the SAS. In January 2002, Justice Weatherup, a Northern Ireland High Court Judge ordered that official military document relating to the shooting should be disclosed. However, PSNI Chief Constable Hugh Orde had the ruling overturned on appeal in January 2005.

In April and May 2012, an inquest in front of a jury was held. Reaching its verdict after hearing weeks of evidence, the jury ruled that the SAS had used "reasonable force" during the operation and that the IRA men's own actions had contributed to their deaths.

== See also ==
- The Troubles in Loughgall
- Provisional IRA East Tyrone Brigade
