= Dominic McGlinchey =

Irish republican (1954–1994)

- Born: 1954; Bellaghy, County Londonderry, Northern Ireland
- Died: 10 February 1994 (aged 39–40); Drogheda, County Louth, Republic of Ireland
- Spouse: Mary McGlinchey
- Military career
- Allegiance: Provisional Irish Republican Army (1979–1982); Irish National Liberation Army (1982–1993)
- Commands: Chief of Staff (INLA)
- Conflict: The Troubles

Dominic McGlinchey (1954 – 10 February 1994) was an Irish republican paramilitary leader and chief of staff of the Irish National Liberation Army (INLA) in the early 1980s. Known for his role in cross-border bombings and assassinations during the Troubles, he was nicknamed "Mad Dog" by the press. He was imprisoned multiple times and survived an assassination attempt before being shot dead in 1994. His legacy remains divisive, with portrayals in Irish fiction, music, and political commentary.

== Background ==
The IRA's last campaign in Northern Ireland, called off in 1962, failed to make an impact on either the government or nationalist consciousness. This failure contributed to the organisation's gradual shift toward Marxist politics. Since Northern Ireland's creation in 1922, the Catholic minority had experienced varying degrees of discrimination from the Protestant and Unionist majority. By the mid-1960s, a growing popular and peaceful campaign emerged to demand civil rights for Catholics. The Northern Ireland government accused the campaign of being a front for republicanism and communism, and indeed, the IRA had infiltrated it from its foundation. Within a few years, tensions between the two communities escalated into violence, and the IRA sought to position itself as the defender of the Catholic population.

In 1969, the IRA split into two factions: the Provisional IRA and the Official IRA. The Officials declared a ceasefire in 1972 and embraced non-violent civil agitation, while the Provisionals intensified their armed campaign against British forces. In 1974, the Officials expelled Seamus Costello, their Operations Officer, for what they termed "factional activity". Costello, dissatisfied with the leadership's rejection of armed struggle, went on to found a new organisation that would combine the Provisionals’ militancy with the Marxist politics of the Officials.

The Irish National Liberation Army (INLA) and its political wing, the Irish Republican Socialist Party (IRSP), were founded on 8 December 1974 at the Spa Hotel in Lucan, Dublin. (Note: The IRSP was the only group founded that morning to be publicly announced. Afterwards, Costello told the assembly, "for those who are interested, there's an afternoon meeting—other avenues will be explored". This was what was to be called the INLA, although until its existence was announced in 1976 it was known only in internal discussions as Group B.) According to journalist Liam Clarke, the Officials made a "determined effort to strangle the breakaway INLA at birth". A bloody feud soon broke out between the groups in Belfast, resulting in six deaths. Costello had fought in the Border campaign in south County Londonderry, and his reputation still carried weight in the area. As Holland and McDonald note, his new organisation had no difficulty attracting recruits from the Officials — by 1977, nearly the entire Official IRA membership in the area had joined the INLA.

Founder members included Jimmy Brown, Tom McCartan, Gino Gallagher, Dessie O’Hare, and Gerard "Dr Death" Steenson — most of whom would later fight alongside or against McGlinchey over the following decade.

== Early life ==
Dominic McGlinchey was born in 1954, in the family home in Ballyscullion Road, Bellaghy, in rural south County Londonderry. He was the third of eleven children in a staunchly republican family. His father owned a garage; some of his father's police customers would later die at McGlinchey's hands. His mother Monica was a devout Catholic. McGlinchey had seven brothers and four sisters. Educated at the local school, he was a bright child, although not outstandingly so, classmates later said. When he was 16 he began an apprenticeship in his father's garage. About this time he was joining the numerous civil rights marches that were taking place in the county. His precise reasons for doing so are unclear, but Dillon speculates that "he was reacting to events around him and the idea of participating in marches offered glamour and a close identification with his own community".

=== Internment and Irish republicanism ===
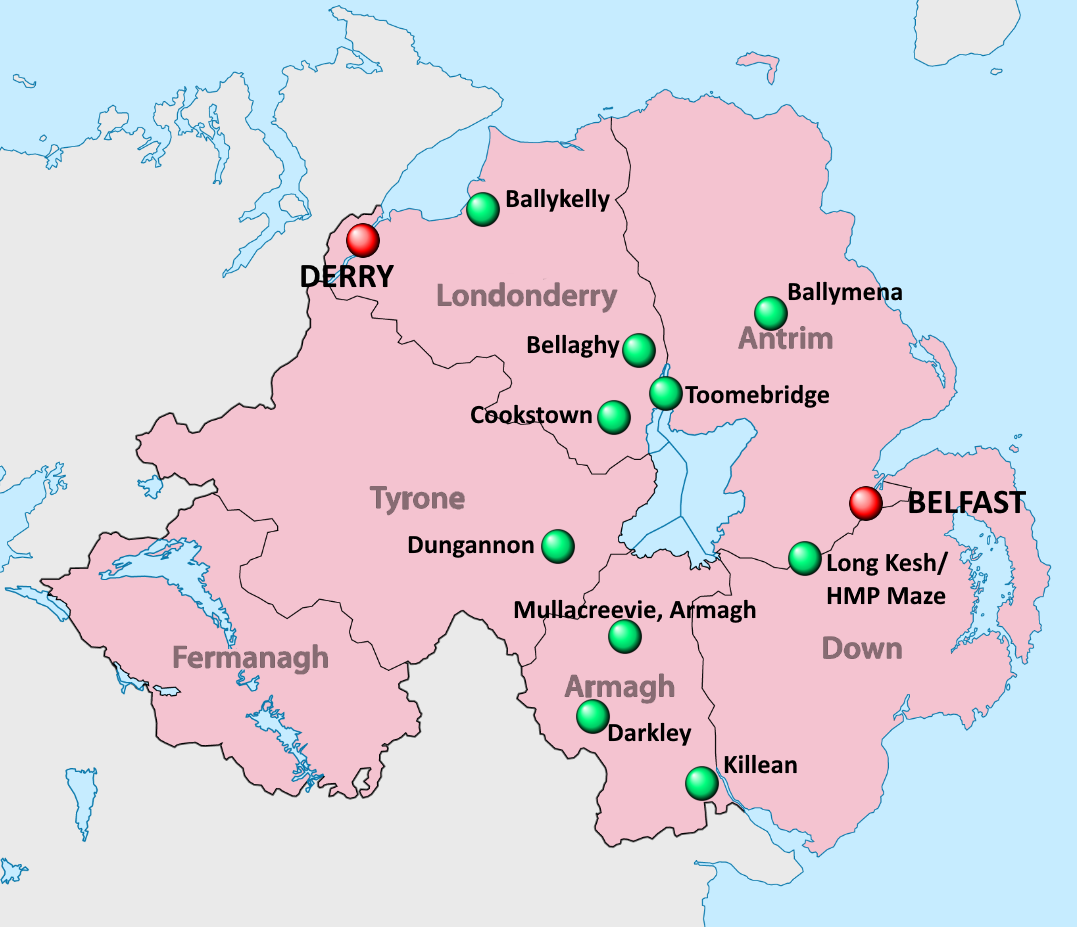
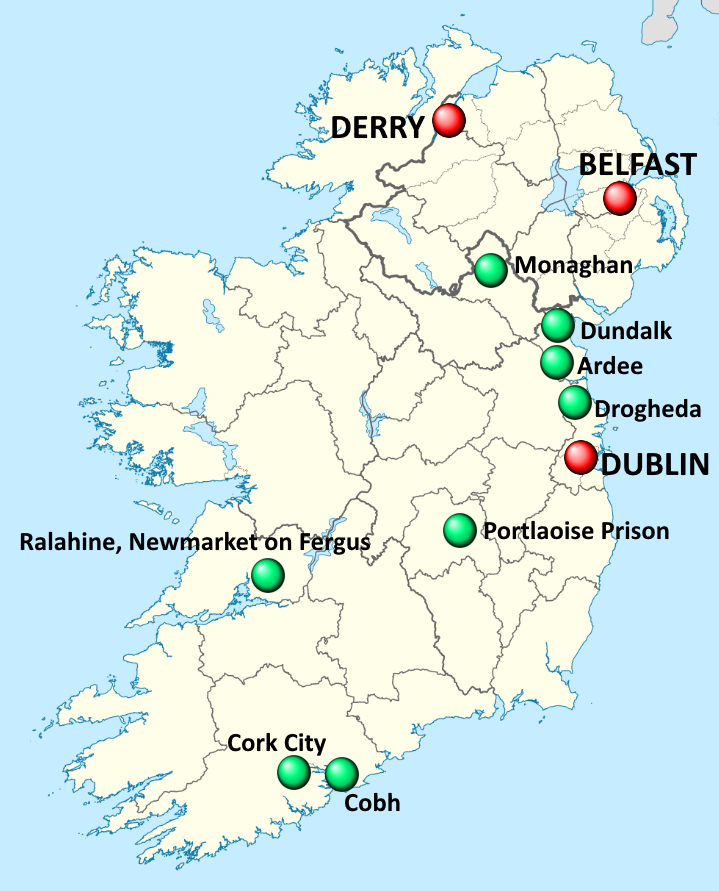

In August 1971 the British army launched Operation Demetrius, which involved the mass arrest and of 342 people suspected of being involved with the IRA. McGlinchey was one of those interned as a result, (Note: Nine of McGlinchey's companions from school were arrested at the same time.) interrupting his fledgeling career as a car mechanic. He spent five days being interrogated in Shackleton Barracks; (Note: Also known as Ballykelly Army Base, and situated on the outskirts of Derry City.) like his fellow internees, he had no access to either family or legal representation. He was then transferred to Magilligan Prison, and later Long Kesh. There he met IRA veterans from the Border campaign, some of whom ran classes in left-wing politics—based on the writings of Marx and James Connolly—as well as military tactics. One man imprisoned with McGlinchey later recalled him as "a big kid out of his depth" who possessed only a limited knowledge of republican history and ideology.

Released in either May or June 1972, McGlinchey's experience appears to have been the catalyst for him to join the physical force movement. (Note: The author Martin McCleery has argued that internment catalysed many young men to join the physical-force republican movement who may not otherwise have done so. The list of releases in 1972, he said, "reads like a 'who's who'" of the IRA, including Gerry Adams, Danny Morrison, Freddie Scappaticci, Denis Donaldson, Patrick Magee, Martin Meehan and Leo Martin as well as McGlinchey.) Coming from a deeply republican area—the failed Border Campaign still a fresh memory—his background gave him "first-class" republican credentials. For those intending to follow such a path, there was still a choice to be had between joining the Official or the Provisional IRAs; (Note: To the extent that Martin McGuinness, in 1970, had originally joined the Official IRA, not even realising that there had been a split.) McGlinchey chose neither. Instead, he joined with Francis Hughes—a childhood friend—Ian Milne and Tom McElwee, and together they formed their own informal unit. McGlinchey later explained their rationale for doing so during what he called "that colourful period": "You meet fellows who now say they had a political philosophy but they had not. You just went out and did it. When I was doing that at the start. I had no idea I was reacting against the State."

The choice of McGlinchey and Hughes to join the Provisionals was probably, Dillon speculates, based on its local image. Particularly in the clubs and bars McGlinchey frequented, "young Provisionals quickly acquired a hero-worship status", and the movement was rooted in the same romantic nationalism that he had grown up with. (Note: Epitomised by Martin McGuinness, Officer Commanding Derry City Brigade, who was also a devout Catholic.) Having joined the IRA's South Derry Brigade, he almost immediately went on the run. Often going south for days or weeks at a time, he was able to avoid immediate re-internment. His training, McGlinchey said, was rudimentary, later stating: "I just picked it up as I went along". Although he occasionally attended IRA training camps with Hughes—who showed an innate aptitude for marksmanship—McGlinchey's skills were in organising and logistics.

McGlinchey was arrested in 1973 for possession of guns, for which he received 18 months imprisonment. (Note: McGlinchey was one of the first people to be tried before the newly-introduced juryless Diplock Court.) Back in Long Kesh, he recommenced his studies in politics and history. This time the class leaders were not old Border campaigners, but relatively young Provisionals. During the period of his incarceration, the external leadership were in secret negotiations with the British government and was considering a ceasefire. McGlinchey did not approve, telling Hughes that he felt that there was an element within the Army Council that was insufficiently committed to the armed struggle.

== IRA career ==
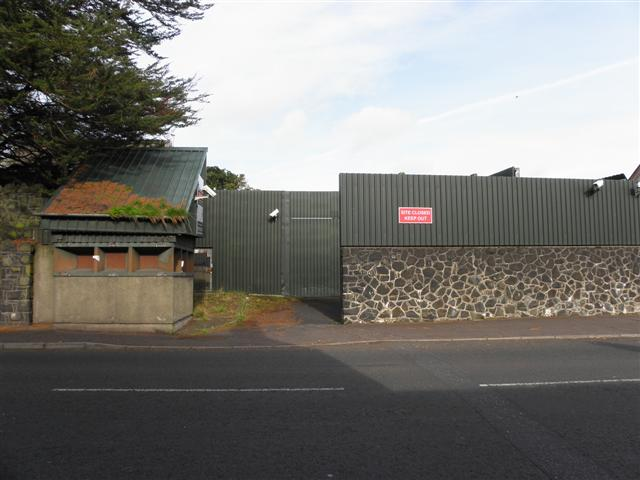
Former police station, Bellaghy, seen in 2011. Note the concrete block to the left; Dillon writes how on one occasion, "in an attack on Bellaghy station, McGlinchey casually walked up to the concrete bunker outside the station and shot the policeman inside it".

On his release from Long Kesh McGlinchey was appointed "Double O"—Operations Officer—for the region, and lived on the run for the next three years. This promotion, says Dillon, now allowed him to select his own targets. Reuniting with Hughes and the others, he told them that he would not become an "armchair general" and would continue to take part in their operations. They carried out frequent and brutal attacks on the British Army. Their activities, says the author Tim Pat Coogan, became the stuff of legend. Such was their impact, says David Beresford in his book Ten Men Dead—giving the example of their murders of Constables John McCracken and Keneth Sheehan in Magherafelt on 8 April 1977 (Note: The constables were members of the RUC's Special Patrol Group unit who had attempted to pull their car over. he SPG was a highly-trained, intelligence-led militarised unit of the RUC which, in the group's own words, was created "to provide backup in civil commotion, to police sensitive areas at times of confrontation, and to show the flag in a disciplined and impressive way to those who wished to break the peace".)—that the Royal Ulster Constabulary issued wanted posters of McGlinchey and the others. These posters—described by later writers as "an unprecedented step" and "a desperate attempt to elicit public support"—listed at length the bombings, shootings and deaths the men were wanted for.

They seemed to have no fear while most us were scared stiff of being shot dead, wounded or captured by the Brits. Something I can't really put my finger on bound them together. Hughes and McGlinchey were really close even though McGlinchey seemed a lot older. Maybe it was because he was in command. I got the impression he wanted to outdo each other. They gained this reputation of being Robin Hood types and they loved it. I'm not saying they weren't always committed to the cause—they were—but you always had the feeling that they lived and breathed action. Francie Hughes just adored guns and he knew how to use them. McGlinchey was a tough guy and nobody gave him lip. What he said, went—it was as simple as that. He wanted to terrorise the security forces the way they terrorised our people. Like, we didn't have any great political discussions about what we were doing.

— Anonymous IRA volunteer speaking to Martin Dillon

According to McGlinchey, the trio expanded their theatre of operations—"we didn't confine ourselves to South Derry", he said—after the IRA's failed 1974 ceasefire. Their activities included bombing barracks (for example, Magherafelt and Toomebridge), towns (including Kilrea, Maghera and Ballymena), as well as killing RUC and UDR men. He particularly favoured those of the latter who lived in isolated, exposed houses, as this made them particularly vulnerable. The towns and police stations he targeted were always in strongly nationalist towns, as he felt that not only would the operation be popular but they would have good escape routes. McGlinchey later calculated that this amounted to over 200 operations over "an intricate maze of fields, lanes, country roads and ditches with which they were intimately familiar". They knew where to hide, how to escape, and who was sympathetic to them; the latter provided them not only with food and drink but intelligence on police and army movements. On one occasion in 1977, McGlinchey evaded the RUC in Randalstown, Antrim—three members of which he had just shot at—with the help of a friendly fisherman who hijacked a motorboat and ferried him across Lough Neagh to Tyrone and his escape. The author Ed Moloney interviewed an anonymous IRA man from the time who described McGlinchey's gang, as well as relations between them and the IRA leadership of Martin McGuinness and Gerry Adams.

Dominic McGlinchey, Frank Hughes, and their gang were in Donegal hiding out for a while. They looked like mujahideen, longhaired, scruffy, heavily armed, driving wrecks of cars. They were fed up staying in cow barns when they heard Adams and McGuinness were on holiday in the area. They found out where Adams was staying and turned up at his chalet, where they were sniffily shown the door. There was no way Gerry and Colette (Note: His wife, née McArdle, whom he had secretly married in 1971.) would let that crowd darken their door. So then they went to where McGuinness was staying. He was annoyed and cursed them up and down, but he let them in and allowed them to stay.

In June 1973, McGlinchey's unit left a car bomb in Coleraine; six people were killed. McGlinchey was also active in internal security, particularly hunting down those he believed to be assisting the security forces. His victims included a caterer from Derry City who was employed at Fort George British Army base. In March 1977 McGlinchey was allegedly part of a gang that killed 67-year-old Hester McMullan, a retired postmistress, in Toomebridge. They had already shot and wounded her son, an RUC reservist, and she died when they then fired on her house. The IRA claimed the attack. A later commentator described how "the woman had been riddled with bullets during an attack on her house in the early hours of the morning, and other members of her family had narrowly escaped". The SAS placed patrols to intercept McGlinchey in areas their intelligence expected him to be in the north, especially along the border. On one such occasion, believing him to be drinking in a specific bar, they raided the house, firing into the ceiling. The SAS reasoned that the patrons would throw themselves to the floor—all except McGlinchey, whom they expected to reach for a weapon and return fire. However, their intelligence was erroneous; McGlinchey was elsewhere.

Under McGlinchey's leadership, his area became one of the most dangerous areas of Northern Ireland for the security forces. This brought him into confrontation with the IRA leadership, to whom he regularly complained about the quality of his men's equipment ("units in South Armagh had 'better gear' than his teams", he moaned). His repeated requests for more and more powerful arms were denied. (Note: Dillon's anonymous source commented that "I knew sooner or later he would run up against the powers-that-be in the movement. Either that, or he'd end up on the Army Council".) For an 18-month period between 1976 and 1977, McGlinchey's unit often cooperated with that of the local INLA, their volunteers often taking part in each other's operations. (Note: This was in stark contrast to Derry City, where Martin McGuinness was firmly in control of the IRA. McGuinness, a traditionalist and staunch Catholic, was "fiercely opposed" to the INLA—whom he called "scumbags"—to the extent that, soon after the new group's formation, he had one of its leading members tarred and feathered for supposed criminality. He also ordered the beating of the INLA's Patsy O'Hara, who McGuinness called a "hood".) However, by the spring of 1977 the INLA in the region had suffered a number of damaging arrests. To avoid losing the IRA's best operatives to a similar fate, McGuinness ordered McGlinchey, Hughes and Milne to go to New York and stay for a while with sympathisers. This may also have been a form of exile due to their indiscipline and over-enthusiasm, as McGuinness was rarely able to control them. He also knew that their capture "would have been a major propaganda coup for the authorities". McGlinchey's stay was a lively one; while there, they were wrongly accused of a robbery, which had been committed by an Irish republican fundraiser. (Note: The Irish historian Anne Dolan says that the three "allegedly robbed one of the IRA's largest American benefactors" while in New York; the incidents may be conflated.) McGlinchey wanted to kill the man but was persuaded against it. The three men returned to Ireland soon after this episode. (Note: Dillon recounts how, also in New York, McGlinchey became involved in a legal dispute between two bar owners, one of whom, Eamon, wanted to buy the other—Declan—out. When the bar owner arrived with his lawyer and the relevant paperwork, McGlinchey was with Declan. McGlinchey had a gun; his companion told the lawyer, "'you can deal with him', pointing to the guy beside him. Eamon and his lawyer left.")

In 1977, following a mailvan robbery, McGlinchey was arrested in County Monaghan for carjacking a Garda patrol vehicle and threatening the officer with a pistol, (Note: Ian Milne was also arrested in Lurgan at around the same time. Hughes had been arrested after a shoot out with the SAS in March the following year, and with McGlinchey already arrested, the Provisional's South Derry operation effectively ground to a halt.) although McGlinchey claimed that the gun was actually a wheelbrace. He failed to make bail at Dublin's Special Criminal Court after a Garda Superintendent argued that McGlinchey would fail to attend court if bailed. McGlinchey was convicted and sent to the Republic of Ireland's maximum-security Portlaoise Prison. In the north, Hughes and Milne carried on as usual, but some veteran republicans, says Dillon, believed that they had lost an experienced advisor, and following the loss of Hughes, writes the ex-Provisional and lawyer Kieran Hughes, "south Derry was never the same after the break-up of the unit centred on Francis Hughes and Dominic McGlinchey".

During McGlinchey's incarceration, suggests Dillon, he reconsidered his role as an operator. McGlinchey, he says, was aware that the amount of attention he would attract on his release would constrain his freedom of action and possibly endanger those he fought alongside. He may also have been warned by the IRA leadership that, for the same reason, he would be unable to return to a commanding role. Consequentially he appears to have considered looking for a new role in Sinn Féin, probably to provide him with cover while organising overall strategy. But, says Dillon, "the more McGlinchey considered the option of a political role, the less he was enamoured of the idea". He suspected he would dislike taking orders from a Sinn Féin manager, and even more so from one that "had never pulled a trigger". An anonymous ex-volunteer told Dillon that "the prospect of being an armchair general didn't much appeal to [McGlinchey], considering the fact that he hated armchair generals".

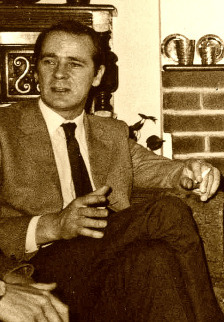
Dáithí Ó Conaill 1974; originally a woodwork teacher before joining the IRA, this became a source of contempt for McGlinchey after the two men fell out in Portlaoise

=== Breakdown of relations with IRA ===
Towards the end of his term, McGlinchey fell out with the IRA's prison leadership, particularly with the ex-Vice President of Sinn Féin, Dáithí Ó Conaill, and the Dublin leadership generally, (Note: A former Provisional told Dillon that if McGlinchey had served his time in Long Kesh rather than Portlaoise, he suspected that McGlinchey would have stayed loyal to the IRA. This was because, the source says, there was much the same feeling towards the southern leadership in the north, and McGlinchey's opinion would not have been that of a minority.) whom he called "armchair generals". As McGlinchey saw it, they were "sitting in the relative security of Dublin while he and Hughes were out shooting up the countryside of South Derry". The confrontation almost turned physical. Dillon's source told him that McGlinchey "was not a man to back down—that was his nature. There was a rumour that he told O'Connell [Dáithí Ó Conaill] he was nothing but a fucking schoolteacher and an armchair general". This was ill-advised, says the source, as the other IRA prisoners in Portlaoise admired Ó Conaill as a "hero and intellectual".

As a result, McGlinchey and the Provisional IRA parted company, and he joined the INLA. Whose decision this was, remains unclear. The IRA leadership said they expelled McGlinchey from the republican wing for indiscipline; McGlinchey, in turn, claimed the Provisionals "had become too soft". A volunteer who was inside with McGlinchey at the time later recalled how vague the information was: "They say that when he was in Portlaoise that he left the Provos and went to the INLA. The Provos say that he couldn't take orders, he wanted to be the big guy, so they threw him out, court-martialled him...some would say there was other stuff involved." (Note: Andrew Sanders suggests that it was not uncommon for Provisionals—particularly prominent ones—to quarrel with their leadership and cites Brendan Hughes as "recalling his own desire to defect to the INLA during his time in Long Kesh".) While imprisoned, McGlinchey had begun to develop his political understanding of Irish Republicanism and political philosophy, reading among other, writings by James Connolly, Frantz Fanon, Amílcar Cabral, Che Guevara and the Belgian Marxist Ernst Mandel. The prisoners frequently indulged in political discussions, which expanded McGlinchey's political understanding. The development of McGlinchey's own political radicalism may also have contributed to a decision of his to leave the IRA. Whatever its origins, contemporaries believed his joining the INLA was firmly encouraged by his wife.

McGlinchey maintained regular contact with the outside, (Note: This was by way of "comms" which were short messages, usually composed on cigarette or toilet paper, which in McGlinchey's case were smuggled out of Portlaoise in a hollowed-out celtic cross. The Republican Movement "develop[ed] a highly efficient system of communication" through comms, argues Beresford: messages were stored on the prisoner's person, passed covertly to a visitor who would likewise conceal it on their person. By the 1981 hunger strike, this method had been honed to the extent that "on occasion, the external leadership could expect to get a message in, a reply out and a second message back in a single day".) and was particularly keen to recruit the last INLA chief of staff—but who had since left the group—back into the organisation. This individual—whose identity remains unknown—seriously considered the offer, but ultimately declined. The reporter Gavin Esler suggests that McGlinchey may have taken a number of disaffected Provisionals from the border region with him to the INLA. (Note: The security analyst Montgomery McFate ascribes McGlinchey's success in taking men with him as being more down to the IRA's lack of attraction to Nationalist youth rather than his own recruiting skill: "New recruits, frustrated by the prospect of weapons classes on video and years of mundane scouting work, preferred to join the INLA instead, which promised active military operations", and so leading, says McFate, to "a haemorrhage of trained men" from the Provisionals.)

== Move to the INLA ==
Following McGlinchey's move to the INLA, says Coogan, "the subsequent history of the movement is appalling". His defection was a "bitter blow" to McGuinness, say the latter's biographers, as he and McGlinchey had become close friends. (Note: Defections such as McGlinchey's also made it harder for the Provisional leadership to control the level of violence at a time when they were actively, if occasionally, involved in peace negotiations.) But the INLA, argues Dillon, was the only armed group at the time "capable of providing McGlinchey with the action he craved", and for his part, McGlinchey's reputation preceded him. He was released from Portlaoise in 1982, having nearly served five years, and made an "immediate impact" on his new organisation. Immediately appointed to the General Headquarters Staff on release, he was soon given the post of director of operations, while a now-unknown Belfast man was appointed chief of staff in July.

Within a short time of his release, McGlinchey had moved his family from Bellaghy to Dundalk. (Note: Muirhevnamor was known as "Little Belfast" on account of the influx of new residents it received from the north, said The Guardian, to escape either the Security Services or sectarianism. The sister of IRA hunger striker Bobby sands, Bernadette Sands McKevitt, lived close by. Local residents complained to the police about the amount of crime on the estate, which the police believed the INLA brought with it; locals also petitioned, unsuccessfully, for their own Gardaí station.) Here he was better situated to organise INLA operations in the Armagh-Newry-Tyrone-South Derry-South West Antrim area. McGlinchey recruited both disaffected Provisionals and new people, and (ruthlessly) put an end to the group's intermittent internal feuding. Anne Dolan, writing in the Dictionary of Irish Biography, suggests that this was one of the reasons he had been recruited by the INLA in the first place. One of his first actions in office was to contact McGuinness in Derry and attempt a rapprochement. This he saw as having—in terms of exchanging intelligence, for example—advantages for both groups. He still respected McGuinness and when they met, McGlinchey assured him that he would not be against joint operations. (Note: In fact, comments Dillon, the Derry IRA had no intention of working with the INLA, as they considered the group inherently unstable. Indeed, he says, they were tempted to punish more INLA men in the city but refrained from doing so as they felt that "with McGlinchey in control, the [resulting] feud would be bloody".)

McGlinchey began his INLA career "orchestrat[ing] a sustained bombing campaign" against Unionist leaders with a swathe of—albeit unsuccessful—bomb attacks on their homes and offices. (Note: The political reasoning was that, while Loyalist groups assassinated Catholic civilians, the INLA reserved to themselves the right to punish those who the INLA believed inspired them. Targets included the secretary of the DUP, Reverend William Beattie; Robert Overend, Deputy Grandmaster of the Orange Order; and UUP leader, James Molyneux.) Not only did the INLA fail to hit any of its designated targets, but a number of their operations killed Catholic children, with three dying in Belfast as a result of INLA explosions in a five-month period. These were propaganda disasters for McGlinchey, and, say Holland and McDonald, "gave the INLA a reputation for recklessness". On the political front, The Times reported in May 1983 that the IRSP was considering standing McGlinchey in the East Londonderry constituency for the recently called election. (Note: The IRSP was considering standing candidates in both Londonderry East and Lagan Valley; the former was McGlinchey's home constituency. They did not in the event do so.) Meanwhile, on McGlinchey's command, the INLA killed Jim Flynn—thought to have been responsible for assassinating Costello—in Dublin in June 1982.

== Chief of staff ==
By June 1983 the INLA chief of staff, McGlinchey's Belfast man, had become unpopular with a number of important figures in the group after a bar-room argument turned ugly. At an Army Council meeting in Ardee held later that month, the Belfast man was sidelined and McGlinchey was elected. (Note: Comment Holland and McDonald, "for the first time in the history of the organisation the INLA had a leader who was not from the old Official IRA stable".) This may not have been to his choice; he was later described by those he fought with as someone who would rather rule through proxies than do so directly himself. (Note: Although at least one source refers to McGlinchey taking over the INLA "at the point of a gun": Liam Clarke, writing in Fortnight, suggested that McGlinchey "marched into a meeting of the army council, produced an Ingram sub-machine gun and ordered the previous chief of staff to leave".) By now the organisation was on the brink of disintegration. It had been badly hit by the supergrass Harry Kirkpatrick, with many of its best men imprisoned on his statements, and paranoia and internal suspicion were rife as a result. Jack Holland and Henry McDonald comment on the INLA's situation in the early- to mid-1980s:

When the INLA seemed on the verge of collapse, it defied all predictions. Instead of breaking apart, it actually raised its violent campaign to levels of bloodshed and horror never equalled before or since in the organisation's history. One of the reasons it was able to do so was the rise to power of a man who became known throughout Ireland as "Mad Dog" McGlinchey.

McGlinchey introduced the policy of "direct military rule" (DMR) which mandated a policy of execution for all crimes by the group's members and brought the headquarters under the direct control of the chief of staff. McGlinchey was now able to act without reference to the rest of the organisation when he chose. (Note: McGlinchey implemented the policy, but it was not a particularly new operating philosophy within the group: Holland and McDonald note that "As far back as the middle of the 1970s INLA prisoners in Long Kesh devised a document calling for direct military rule to be imposed on the party and army in order to forge a revolutionary republican socialist movement. Indeed in 1976, Tommy McCartan was arrested at a house in south-central Dublin with forty INLA documents outlining the necessity of DMR".) Dolan describes him as "unleash[ing] a reign of personal terror over the undisciplined organisation; opponents and suspected informers were ruthlessly purged", while the Lost Lives team comment that "in practice, [DMR] appeared to give him licence to carry out shootings without reference to the rest of the organisation". As a result of the free licence this policy gave McGlinchey, tensions heightened with other republicans, particularly in South Armagh. (Note: McGlinchey appears to have maintained contact with the IRA, if not friendly relations, if Eamon Collins is to be believed. In his autobiography, Collins tells how a rogue IRA commander offered to sell McGlinchey IRA weapons; McGlinchey informed the IRA of their man's offer, and the latter only narrowly escaped being killed for treachery.)

McGlinchey, says Dillon, "soon discovered that it was not an easy task to control some of the men under his command or to prevent what he termed 'botched operations'". Following a series of counter-productive actions in Belfast, (Note: The INLA had planted a bomb in the Divis Flats—previously an INLA stronghold—which had killed a British soldier but also two young children. This had resulted in a large demonstration taking place outside the IRSP's Falls Road Headquarters by Divis residents who demanded that the INLA units withdraw from the flats. On another occasion, a booby trap had exploded near the Ormeau Road killing a young Catholic man. These operations, suggests Dillon, "confirmed the cowboy and reckless operatives under McGlinchey's control".) McGlinchey refocussed on the rural areas, whose commanders he told to "pull their weight".

=== Droppin Well bombing ===
- Q. How could such an operation possibly be justified in view of the inevitability of civilian casualties?
- A. The owner of that pub was warned six times about entertaining members of the security forces there. He knew full well and the girls that attended the disco there knew full well that the warnings had been given and that the place was going to be bombed at some stage or another.
- Q. But the issue was that it was absolutely inevitable that planting the bomb in those circumstances meant that there would be civilian casualties and therefore does not a conflict exist with protestations of concern for civilians?
- A. We didn't think we would kill civilians. The bomb was placed in a manner to avoid civilian casualties.
- Q. But how could you possibly place a bomb in a disco attended by a large number of civilians without expecting civilians to be killed?
- A. We did give warnings again and again about this and the people that were there must have known what the consequences of it were likely to be.
- Q. Was he personally involved in the Ballykelly bombing?
- A. He did not plant the bomb.
- Q. Did he plan it or was he in any way involved in it?
- A. Yes, he was.

— Vincent Browne questions McGlinchey over his role in the Droppin' Well bombing. Note that Browne's questions, and McGlinchey's answers, are set in the third person.

Following McGlinchey's criticism of the Derry Brigade's lack of activity, they devised a plan that met with his approval. The target was the Droppin Well bar in Ballykelly, where, McGlinchey was advised, soldiers from the army base regularly drank. McGlinchey instructed them to proceed with the bombing and to ensure maximum casualties. He knew, but ignored, the near-inevitability of civilian deaths. On 6 December 1982 17 people—11 soldiers of the Cheshire Regiment and six civilians—were killed after a timebomb exploded in the middle of a disco. This brought the roof of the pub in. To McGlinchey, they—whether Protestant or Catholic—were fraternising with the enemy. Four of the dead were women; the INLA's subsequent claim of responsibility described them and the other injured women as "consorts". Although McGlinchey later claimed that the bar owner had received multiple warnings against serving soldiers, it is unlikely that any such warnings were given.

Following the Droppin Well bombing, McGlinchey became a "hate figure": DUP MP Willie McRea called for the destruction of "this insane devilish brat McGlinchey" in the House of Commons, calling him a "well-known mass-murderer", while Taoiseach Garret FitzGerald told the Oireachtas that the bombing was a "blasphemous sectarian act". McGlinchey, already a "prime target" for British intelligence, was now called the "most wanted man in Ireland". The British Government had been attempting to persuade that of the Republic to extradite republicans to face justice in the North for many years, with no success. The Ballykelly bombing encouraged the Irish court to reconsider its position: the following day, Ireland's Supreme Court ordered McGlinchey to be extradited to Belfast in response to an earlier RUC request for McGlinchey to be returned to them to face trial for the murder of Hester McMullan. (Note: The Supreme Court's decision was delivered in McGlinchey v. Wren.) This was despite the INLA being still a legal organisation at that point and McGlinchey himself—having already absconded from bail while in the north—being on the run and unobtainable. (Note: On 8 January 1983 Garret FitzGerald's coalition government proscribed the organisation, with a seven-year sentence for membership.)

The court's decision was a dramatic break with precedent, and a controversial one, as the Republic objected to the use of Diplock courts in the north; it had rejected 48 similar applications from the north since 1970; this was the first such extradition since the creation of the Irish Free State in 1922. Despite, says law professor Brice Dickson, the Republic of Ireland operating the juryless Special Criminal Courts in Dublin and being openly critical of the northern legal system. There were also concerns that Irish people were the subject of miscarriages of justice in mainland Britain. The Leader of the Opposition, Charles Haughey, for example, opined that

In view of the serious doubts I have about the fairness of the trial they would get in British courts, anybody accused of these [so-called political] crimes should be dealt with before our courts so that we know at least they would get a scrupulously fair trial.

Legal scholarship was divided. Patrick Keatinge argues that "given the long-standing political and legal inhibitions regarding extradition", that of McGlinchey was "bound to be controversial in Ireland, however much it was welcomed by the British government". The legal scholar B. W. Warner, suggests that by now "the climate of opinion towards the bombers and gunmen had grown hostile", while The Economist expressed the opinion that the extradition "offers some hope of less bitterness" between north and south. McGlinchey, in absentia, fought the decision. Although he rejected accusations of involvement in the murder, he claimed—in the words of the Extradition Act of 1965—that the Toomebridge operation had been "a political offence or an offence connected with a political offence". Through his solicitors, McGlinchey presented evidence of his IRA active service at the time in the form of wanted posters, charge sheets and articles naming him in the Ballymena Guardian. This was not accepted, and McGinchley re-approached his challenge, this time basing it on the clause of the Act which prevented extradition if there were grounds for believing that, following transfer the individual would then in any case still be prosecuted for political offences. In a two-hour hearing, Chief Justice Tom O'Higgins rejected this claim also. (Note: O'Higgins was a former Presidential candidate for Fine Gael; his uncle was Kevin O'Higgins, who the IRA had shot dead in 1927 in revenge for his signing the death warrants of 70 Anti-treaty IRA volunteers during the Irish Civil War; the historian Ruán O'Donnell describes O'Higgins the younger "a distinctly conservative voice on the Supreme Court".)

He recorded the court's opinion that "modern terrorist violence...is often the antithesis of what could reasonably be regarded as political, either in itself or in its connections". Higgins also declared that whether the victim of the alleged political offence—in McGlinchey's case, Hester —was killed or not was irrelevant to the question; the important point, he stressed, was that she was a civilian. "An elderly grandmother riddled with bullets", he continued, was in no way what "reasonable civilised people would regard as political activity". Public interest in McGlinchey's extradition subsided following the judgement, as, notes the jurist Alpha Connelly, he "did not oblige the Irish authorities by presenting himself to them for the purpose of extradition pursuant to the Supreme Court judgement".

=== Internal security ===
McGlinchey only ever crossed the border into Northern Ireland when an operation required it, which made it harder for the security services to maintain effective surveillance. (Note: The Secretary of State for Northern Ireland, Roy Mason had said in 1978 that the border gave "succour to law-breakers" and complained in the House of Commons that " people are using the border both to operate from and to escape".) In spite of secret surveillance south of the border, the Special Reconnaissance Unit (Note: Also known as the 14 Field Security and Intelligence Company (informally "The Det"), part of the Army's Intelligence Corps.) had difficulty monitoring McGlinchey, argues the journalist Peter Taylor. As a result, they "did the next best thing and latched on to an INLA associate", Seamus Grew. Grew was a close friend of Mary McGlinchey. By tailing Grew north of the border, the SRU hoped to be led to McGlinchey. The RUC's intelligence arm, E4A, believing him to be in Armagh, thought they knew the route he would be taking back to the south. Six days after the Droppin Well bombing, Grew and another INLA member Roderick "Roddy" Carroll, were shot dead at an RUC checkpoint while driving through Mullacreevie. McGlinchey—the intended target—had been seen getting into their car in the south by The Det surveillance. He was believed to be bringing a bag of guns into the north. This was not the case; (Note: The RUC said, at first, that this had been a random roadblock. John Stalker, Deputy Chief Constable of Greater Manchester Police, was appointed to investigate the allegations in 1984. He uncovered a "complex operation" by the RUC that involved not only surveillance but "unauthorized journeys by police officers into the Irish Republic", with the aim of capturing McGlinchey. Some of the bullets were fired from close quarters and caused controversy. The operation raised questions as to whether the RUC had a "shoot-to-kill policy"; Stalker believed so. He complained, says Davies, of "'downright obstructiveness' by RUC officers. He was also informed that a McGlinchey had indeed been in the car with the Grew and Carroll, but was refused permission to interview the soldiers concerned. Grew's brother was Officer Commanding the Armagh IRA—and was killed himself in a 1990 SAS ambush at Loughall, County Tyrone—and Carroll had been named by Kirkpatrick as having been involved in a long list of robberies and killings.) the handbrake was on, and neither were Grew or Carroll armed. It seems probable that he had been in the vehicle a few minutes earlier, but had alighted before reaching the roadblock, with what the Belfast priest and peace activist Fra Raymond Murray has called an "instinctive intuition". Dillon posits that the army had a shoot-to-kill policy with regard to McGlinchey, believing him to be always heavily armed and unlikely to surrender without a fight.

The deaths of Grew and Carroll reinforced McGlinchey's conviction that there was a mole in the organisation with the sole intention of "setting up McGlinchey". Six months after Grew and Carroll were killed, McGlinchey believed he had found the source of E4A's information: Eric Dale, he believed, had provided the RUC with the information they required to locate Grew and Carroll. (Note: McGlinchey may have been correct in his assumption, as after his death the RUC stated that although Dale had not been an informer, he "in fact had been providing them with information". Keane suggests that McGlinchey had set Dale up by deliberately leaking information to him and then waiting for it to be used by the police.)

On the evening of 3 May 1983, McGlinchey personally led the gang who kidnapped Dale in front of his girlfriend, Claire McMahon, in Monaghan. She later said that the men originally said they wanted to speak to Dale "about guns or something that was missing". McGlinchey's role in the operation was to keep McMahon calm in the front room while other gang members interrogated Dale in the hallway. Mary McGlinchey was part of this team. (Note: The British agent in the IRA known as Stakeknife later claimed that, in particular, it was Mary who tortured Dale by sitting him on the hotplates of his kitchen stovetop.) McMahon later said that the only time she saw her partner again he was lying face-down on the floor surrounded by six people with guns. Dillon describes McGlinchey's appearance that night:

McGlinchey's balaclava had slits for his eyes and stretched below his chin; he wore a combat jacket, and a shoulder holster resting on his chest contained a .44 magnum revolver. His right hand was positioned near the gun butt and his left held the holster.

McGlinchey told Claire that Dale would be returned to her shortly, and then emptied McMahon's car boot and bundled Dale into it. McGlinchey told her that if she had not heard from Dale by morning, she was to make her way to Culloville for information; McMahon, realising that the gang were going to steal her car as well, asked how she was expected to travel from Monaghan to South Armagh without a vehicle. She was not to see Dale again; his body was found four days later outside Killean. An INLA statement claimed that he had been executed for—among other things—trying to establish the whereabouts of "an alleged INLA man wanted on both sides of the border". This was an indirect reference to McGlinchey himself. (Note: McGlinchey was not always successful in his campaign against those he saw as informers. The IRA supergrass, Eamon Collins, related a story in his subsequent autobiography how another INLA/IRA informer whom Collins met in prison, Tony O'Doherty, had "narrowly escaped being executed. He found himself in the back of a car driven by Dominic McGlinchey. As McGlinchey taunted him, telling him he was going to be executed. Tony had escaped by pulling out a small pistol provided by the police which he had hidden in one of his socks.") As the Dale case illustrates, McGlinchey occasionally tortured his victims, often "with the aid of instruments such as a red-hot poker", says Coogan, often using Tom McCartan, a "quick-tempered and violent man", for such work.

McGlinchey's efforts in counterintelligence did not stand in the way of the armed campaign. In May 1983 both McGlincheys, with two other men, took part in a drive by gun attack on a Cookstown checkpoint, him with a machine gun and her using a pistol. A police constable reservist, Colin Carson, was killed and fire was exchanged between those in the van and the RUC in a sangar. McGlinchey's fingerprints were later found in the van. The operation, said the UPI at the time, was claimed by the IRA's Tyrone Brigade as their responsibility, although it is generally considered to have been carried out by McGlinchey's group.

Money and weapons were essential for the INLA's campaign, and McGlinchey—by now accompanied by Dessie O'Hare—organised a number of bank and Securicor robberies, on one occasion stealing £100,000 in a single raid. This allowed tentative plans to buy arms from the United States to be put into effect, although, in the event, the plan came to nothing. (Note: Some guns were obtained from the French guerrilla outfit Action Directe, but the arms route from the Middle East instigated by Costello largely dried up during McGlinchey's tenure.) Another two robberies in Cork brought the group £300,000 between them. Another favourite fundraising technique was fraud, one case of which was meant to have netted the group £140,000 in stolen bankers' orders. However, Éamon McMahon from South Armagh, whose job it was to cash the orders, paid nothing. McMahon was an associate of Patrick Mackin—with whom McGlinchey was involved in a personal feud—and, to resolve the issue, both men agreed to meet Mary McGlinchey in the Imperial Hotel in Dundalk. Trusting her, suggest Holland and McDonald, "was a fatal mistake": (Note: The journalist Maggie O'Kane cites one of Mary's old flatmates as saying "you had to be very, very careful not to get on the wrong side of Mary McGlinchey or you would be in a real trouble".) Mary had lured them there for her husband to kill. (Note: McMahon came from a respected Republican family in the area, whose parents had been good friends with Cardinal Ó Fiaich.)

British intelligence also continued its attempts to capture McGlinchey. One extreme tactic, allegedly used in October 1983, was described by The Guardian as "badly botched". A fake tour operator called Caruso, under cover of an address in London's Albemarle Street, wrote to Tony and Margaret Hayde in September informing them that they had won third-prize in a competition, an all-expenses-paid week in Torremilenos. The Haydes were founder members of the IRSP, and The Times reported that "the couple, who admit to having met Dominic McGlinchey, allegedly INLA chief of staff and Ireland's most wanted man, say they were offered immediate cash and the promise of a further £10,000 in return for information". (Note: The episode remains obscure, and it was suggested by The Times that it could have been an Irish Republican plot intended to discredit the Security Service, although the paper also points out that the telephone number provided on the headed paper was registered to MI6's London Station in Vauxhall Bridge Road. Supposedly, Casuro wrote to Mr and Mrs Haydes in June 1983 informing them that a computer had selected them to take part in prize draw. Margaret Haydes then filled in a questionnaire about holiday locations and returned it. Writing the following year, The Guardian, on the other hand, believes that MI6 "lured" the couple abroad for reasons asserted by the Haydes, with the service's primary objective of getting access to McGlinchey. The Haydes declined the offer, they said, and checked out of their hotel immediately.)

By the end of 1983, relations with the Derry IRA had become fraught. The IRA had publicly condemned an INLA no-warning carbomb, and a number of IRA men had equally publicly left the organisation for the INLA. Matters came to a head in early December when an INLA man was accused of stealing an IRA gun, to which he retaliated by threatening senior Derry republicans. McGuinness, in an attempt to forestall a feud, contacted McGlinchey—both men had stayed in contact after McGlinchey had left—for assistance. McGlinchey met his man in Dundalk and instructed him to return the gun, in exchange for assurances as to the volunteer's safety. In an attempt to restore the peace, in a December 1983 interview with the Starry Plough, McGlinchey supported Sinn Féin's decision to increase its political involvement in the Republic and called for greater cooperation in the north between the two groups.

INLA violence continued alongside fundraising ventures and personal vendettas, although often unsuccessfully. For example, two operations had been planned for 13 August 1983. An RUC reservist was to be killed at a checkpoint in Markethill, while in Dungannon the police station was to be shot up. Both attempts were failures. At Markethill the unit failed to kill any police, while in Dungannon the INLA unit was ambushed and two volunteers shot dead. At the debriefing of the surviving volunteers, an attendee later recalled, McGlinchey "went mad and called us all stupid cunts". McGlinchey was also concerned about the loyalty of certain members of his Belfast Brigade, a number of whom were summoned to the Ardee farmhouse in late October 1983. Also kidnapped and brought to Ardee at the same time was ex-INLA member Gerard "Sparky" Barkley, who had been a close friend of Kirkpatrick. Although Barkley had publicly left the organisation, McGlinchey suspected him to be robbing banks with INLA weapons but not paying over anything to his old comrades as would be expected. Barkley swore that he was now merely an "ODC", or ordinary decent criminal. He was not believed. Following interrogation, Barkley was shot on McGlinchey's orders by either Paul "Bonanza" McCann or Mary McGlinchey. (Note: The increasing distance between the INLA factions in Dublin and Belfast is reflected in the fact that, while the former announced that Barkley had been shot for criminality and informing, the latter section claimed he had been assassinated by British security. Further, in a move intended to deliberately anger McGlinchey, when Barkley's body was returned to Belfast, his ex-comrades buried him with full Republican honours. An anonymous member of the Official IRA later described Barkley as a "charming rogue", while an INLA leader said "he enjoyed life. He loved money, and he hated the Brits".)

=== Darkley massacre ===
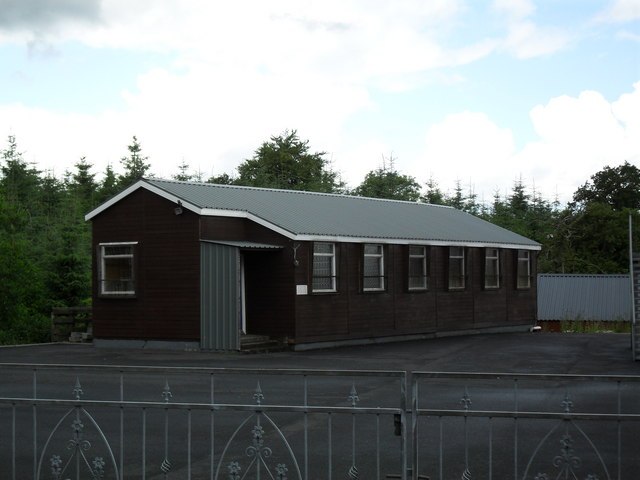
The Pentecostal Church in Darkley, attacked by the INLA in 1983

On 21 November 1983 two armed men walked into the Pentecostal Church in Darkley, South Armagh. They opened fire on the congregation, who were singing "Are You Washed in the Blood of the Lamb?", and shot a number of worshippers, three of whom died with many more injured. A previously unknown group calling itself the Catholic Reaction Force soon claimed responsibility for the killings, which it called a "token retaliation". (Note: The name "Catholic Reaction Force" was used on other occasions. For example, in May 1986 it was used to claim the killing of Protestant civilian David Wilson (39), who was shot while driving his firm's van in Donaghmore. The IRA also claimed responsibility, saying Wilson was a member of the UDR. The "Catholic Reaction Force" declared a ceasefire on 28 October 1994.) The RUC confirmed that weaponry used in previous INLA operations had been used. The INLA, however, denied involvement and condemned the attack, (Note: Although, say Holland and McDonald, the group's refutation was "coloured by a rather ludicrous claim that the guns used in the murders were seized by the security forces in an arms haul and that the attack was the work of British intelligence".) although McGlinchey later acknowledged the presence of an INLA volunteer in the group to whom, McGlinchey admitted, he had loaned a Ruger rifle. (Note: This Ruger was McGlinchey's favourite rifle, according to Dillon, and he had used it on other attacks, including that on Cookstown Barracks.) McGlinchey expressed dismay at the attack and seems to have been unaware it was to take place, but notwithstanding this, the political damage was done and his name was now linked firmly to violent sectarianism. The attack had been the idea of a Belfast INLA man as revenge for the death of his brother at the hands of loyalists; he told McGlinchey that he wanted weapons to target a known UVF man.

McGlinchey quickly acted to put distance between himself and the Darkley massacre. Referring to the reason for the attack he had originally been given, he claimed that the INLA man, following the death of his brother, involved "must have been unbalanced or something to have organised this killing". (Note: Vincent Browne, referencing the harsh stance McGlinchey took against those who disobeyed his orders, pressed McGlinchey on what would happen to the man responsible; McGlinchey replied, "I can't really say but I would not be in favour of taking action against the lad because of the pressure he was under". The New York Times reported at the time that the brother in question was Adrian Carroll, brother to Roderick Carroll who had been killed the previous year.) In an interview with the IRSP's newspaper, The Starry Plough, he stated of the Darkley killings: "I condemn them. Those people were only hillbilly folk who had done no harm to anyone. They are in no way a legitimate target. These killings are contrary to republican socialism. They cannot be defended." Coogan also suggests that the man who planned the attack was "clearly deranged". The Irish anthropologist S. Bruce argues that McGlinchey's approach can "reasonably" be inferred to have been that "if Protestants get caught in the cross-fire, they deserve it".

Darkley was yet another propaganda disaster for the INLA, and whether McGlinchey liked it or not, symbolised what it was best known for. The murders heightened McGlinchey's profile further, and, argue Holland and McDonald, for much of 1983 "Ireland and Britain were gripped by 'Mad Dog' fever". McGlinchey—still on the run—was reportedly spotted all over the island. McGlinchey's tactics for evading capture, the Gardaí later reported, included never staying in the one place too long and frequently disguising his appearance. (Note: His methods of disguise ranged from dyeing his hair, growing a beard and/or moustache, "and even dressing as a woman", reported The New York Times.) On one occasion, claimed The Guardian, his disguise was good enough to enable him to attend his sister's wedding "and that not even those standing in the church during the ceremony realised that he was there".

==== Sunday Tribune interview ====
Six days after the Darkley attack, McGlinchey gave an interview to the Sunday Tribune, conducted by its editor, Vincent Browne. (Note: The Sunday Tribune has been described as "aggressively radical" in its philosophy, and Browne as having a "considerable reputation for what might be termed 'jugular journalism'...a thorn in the flesh of the establishment". Browne claimed to have met members of all the major terrorist groups in the course of his career, and he was willing to listen and report on all sides of the war in the north. Martin Dillon has called Browne's interview with McGlinchey "undoubtedly one of the most revealing" of the period; Dolan terms it "extraordinary". It is unknown how or when the interview was arranged, with Browne merely confirming that it took place in the Irish Republic "very late one night" the week before.) Browne said that the public had a right to know about McGlinchey, and McGlinchey was keen to put his side of the story across, as by now the IRA had also condemned Darkley as purely sectarian. (Note: Newspapers reported that, following Darkley, the IRA were "looking for" McGlinchey.) He appears to have offered the BBC the opportunity to interview him first, but they declined. Browne and McGlinchey talked for four hours, only being interrupted for occasional refreshment. Browne later annotated his notes of the interview, describing McGlinchey as speaking "with a soft Derry accent...for the most part, relaxed, composed and fairly articulate". Browne suggested that the term "Mad Dog" seemed misapplied to the man he interviewed although also that "there is a coldness about him in relation to the consequences of his actions which is chilling". Browne realised that McGlinchey was not used to speaking with journalists, as he was "quite devoid of the caution and guile" Browne was usually met with by his subjects. McGlinchey may, Browne said, have been overly tired. Conversely, Browne noted, the pressure of the situation may have sharpened McGlinchey's wits, for Browne wrote that McGlinchey soon "perked up" and became "unusually well able to carry the drift of an argument through several convolutions". Their conversation shifted from Irish politics to the global; this may have been deliberate on McGlinchey's part to distract from the Darkley attack and questions as to his own role in it. Browne discussed McGlinchey's preferred tactics on an operation, asking, for example, whether McGlinchey ever saw the face of his victim:

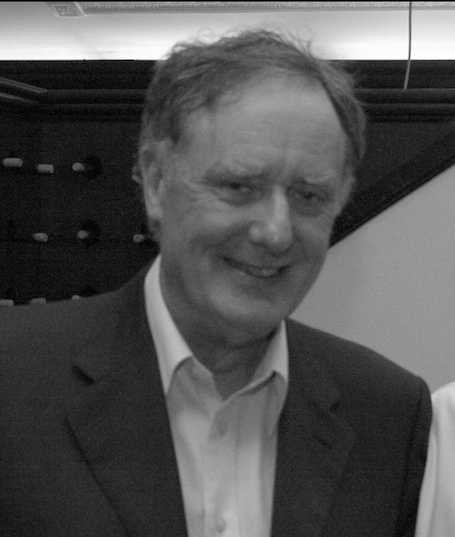
Vincent Browne, who interviewed an on-the-run McGlinchey in 1983, photographed in 2008

Usually, for I like to get in close, to minimise the risk for myself. It's usually just a matter of who gets in first and by getting in close you put your man down first. It has worked for me down the years. I wouldn't be as good as they are [the security forces] shooting it out over distances because I don't get the opportunity for weapons and target training like they do. So I believe in getting in close'.

The last time this had happened, added McGlinchey, was "the Cookstown job", referring to the death of Constable Carson in May that year. McGlinchey described how he "went up to the bunker outside the police station and just opened up on the policeman in the bunker". One of the few times McGlinchey seemed uneasy in the interview, wrote Browne, was when he was asked about the children of McGlinchey's victims, to which he replied in generalities. He also became agitated, saying that he refused to be "blackmailed by the grief of children". McGlinchey showed no remorse for his activities, said Browne, only a "frightening indifference". After the interview was published, the Gardaí visited the Tribune's offices and studied it minutely to extract any clue as to his whereabouts. In Britain, The Guardian newspaper described McGlinchey's availability for interviewing by anyone he wanted "embarrassing" for the Gardaí at a time when the police were under pressure to capture him. (Note: Browne denounced McGlinchey in his editorial, but that did not prevent Browne being summoned to Tony Ryan's house (Ryan had brought the paper out of liquidation the year before) for a bollocking "where the confrontation was physical as well as verbal".)

=== Capture ===
The manhunt for McGlinchey and his gang involved hundreds of soldiers and Gardaí, while the media "followed their trail around the Republic in some awe". A Gardaí patrol eventually discovered him accidentally in Cork City on 2 December 1983. Far from being a police triumph, the encounter was "one of the more farcical incidents" among what Dolan calls their "picaresque" manhunt. Two Gardaí knocked on the door and, receiving no answer, attempted to force an entry. McGlinchey−with Mary−and comrades were covering them with their guns as the police entered. A later report suggested that Mary had wanted to kill them, but her husband restrained her. The republicans made them strip at gunpoint—a tactic McGlinchey used a number of times in encounters with the Gardaí—and tied them up. The officers took three hours to escape from their bonds, by which time McGlinchey and his gang had stolen a car and escaped with the help of a local man. McGlinchey's "humiliation" of the Gardaí, says Dillon, "energised" the manhunt. (Note: Coogan described McGlinchey as operating a "Standing Order No.8 policy" with regard to the Garda Siochana, which guaranteed their physical safety. In June 1973, the IRA's Army Council had issued its General Army Orders, which were intended to govern the behaviour of its volunteers. Standing order No.8 dictated that: "volunteers are strictly forbidden to take any military action against 26 County forces under any circumstances whatsoever. The importance of this in present circumstances cannot be over-emphasised." The complete General Orders has been published by the author Brendan O'Brien as an appendix to his 1993 book The Long War.) It also, suggests Coogan, "inject[ed] something of a Robin Hood element" to republican propaganda, as well as—by making them "peel off" their uniforms—"adding a new definition to the tern 'peeler'". (Note: "Peeler" is a slang term for a policeman, and named after Sir Robert Peel, the 19th-century Home Secretary who turned the extant embryonic law enforcement agencies into one official paid profession.) The gang were armed with automatic assault rifles, pump-action shotguns and short arms.

McGlinchey and his gang were eventually captured on his way to meet his children—on which account, he later said, he panicked when he was surrounded—on St Patrick's Day 1984 in County Clare. (Note: The Economist magazine noted that McGlinchey's capture and extradition was one of a number of events which "kept Ireland in the spotlight" of public attention. Derry City had seen bitter rioting over the previous week, the Irish delegation to an EEC summit in Brussels had walked out of fishing negotiations, and three days earlier the UDA had attempted to assassinate Gerry Adams outside Belfast Crown Court.) They holed himself up in the house of John Lyons, a musician; although Lyons was absent, his wife and children were at home, hostages for McGlinchey. The Gardaí's Security Task Force—numbering 40 men—did not expect to be able to force his surrender, so they were accompanied by the Irish Army who were equipped with Uzi submachine guns. As the police drove up to the house, McGlinchey opened fire on the leading vehicle from an upstairs room. Garda Chris Power was hit in the shoulder, and was forced to remain in the car for safety while the firefight took place, even though he was bleeding heavily. Both sides exchanged shots, until a priest was sent in to negotiate with McGlinchey from the bottom of the stairs. At 7:15 pm, having been wounded, and to safeguard Mrs Lyons, and both their children—McGlinchey's were nearby, in the care of a supporter—he surrendered. The priest, Father Timothy Tuohy, later told how McGlinchey and his gang wanted him to stay with them as they left the house, expressing fears that they would be assassinated if there were no witnesses.

== Extradition, imprisonment, release and imprisonment ==
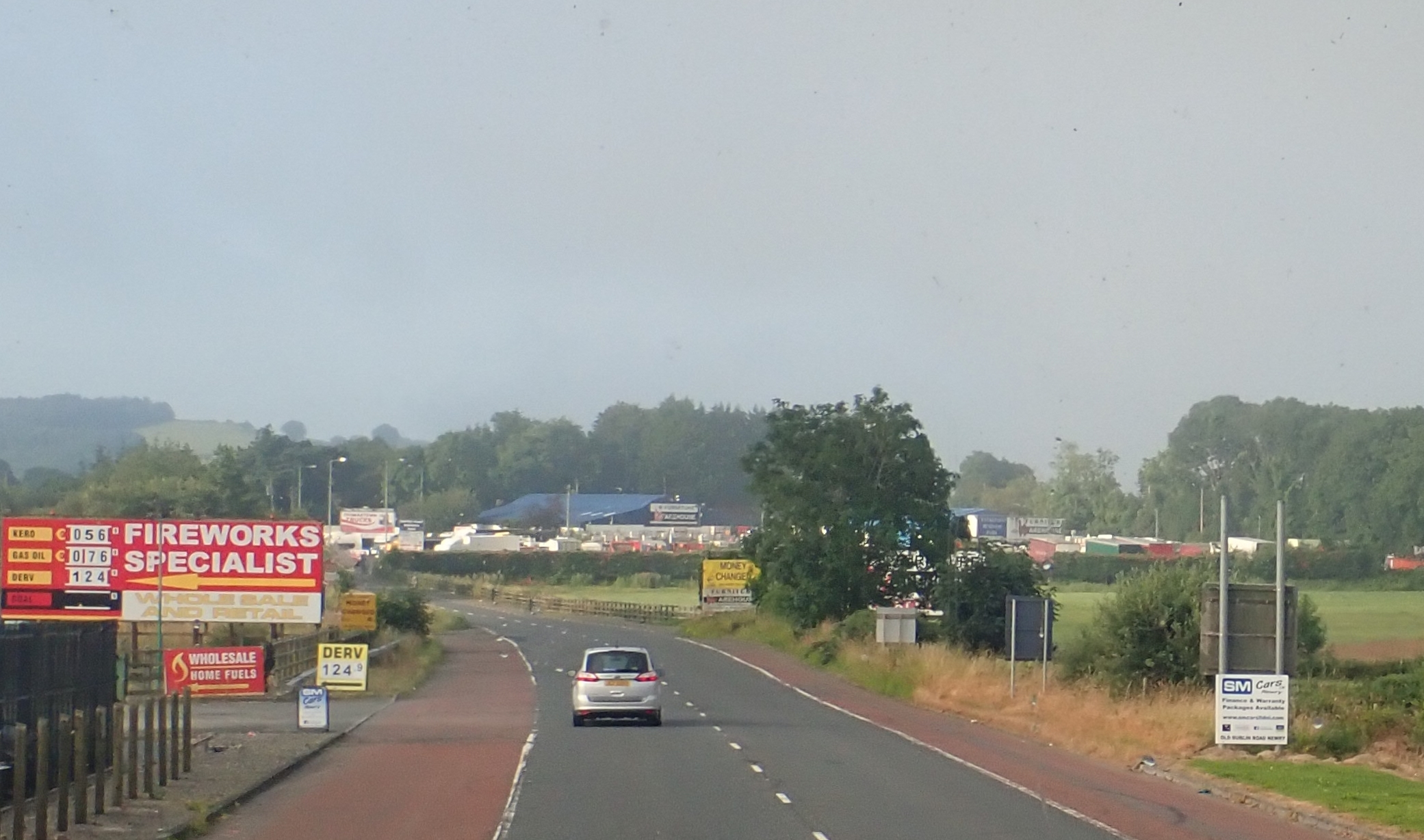
2019 view from the Armagh-side of the Killeen border crossing—on the B113, or Old Dublin Road—where McGlinchey was handed by the Gardaí to the RUC, and then back again; the border itself lies approximately by the yellow sign to the right of the road

Following McGlinchey's arrest, he was interrogated in Ennis police station. (Note: While in Ennis, reported The New York Times, McGlinchey requested to see his two sons, whom a friend had brought to the station, although in the event the Gardaí forbade the visit.) In Dublin, events moved fast. The Supreme Court had already authorised his extradition to the north, and now had to be "hastily convened"—since it was the evening of a bank holiday—to action it. This occurred "fairly promptly", noted Gemma Hussey, Minister for Employment Affairs and Social Protection, in her cabinet diary. There was some uncertainty as to whether McGlinchey would be extradited immediately or be prosecuted in the south for his offences there first. McGlinchey appealed the decision, questioning the constitutionality of the 1965 Act. This was rejected ex tempore by the court. In O'Donnell's words, thanks to the Attorney General Peter Sutherland "and an unprecedented" court sitting, within 18 hours of his arrest in Clare he was transferred to the RUC at the Killeen border checkpoint. This took place at around 1 am on the morning of 18 March 1984 and had been the fastest extradition in Irish history. It was also the first: no republican had ever been extradited from the Republic to the North. (Note: McGlinchey's extradition was notable, not just in the short term, but in the long term also, as the British government recognised that it represented a seismic shift in the Republic's attitude towards extraditing to the North.) McGlinchey appointed a Newry man called "Jap" chief of staff during McGlinchey's enforced absence. McGlinchey's extradition was criticised in the Republic by those who wished him to face justice first for the crimes he had committed there "before caving in on the important principle of extradition". The British Secretary of State for Northern Ireland, James Prior, hailed the arrest as "a major victory in the struggle against terrorism", while the MEP for Northern Ireland, John Taylor called it "the best news to come out of Dublin for many years". Sinn Féin said the extradition had caused "a sense of treachery and anger" in the Nationalist community; The Economist wrote that, while "the IRA had no love for Mr McGlinchey...it must fear the creation of precedents that could affect its own gunmen". The largest opposition political party in the Republic, Fianna Fáil, "kept an uneasy silence while some backbenchers protested" against it, while the Taoiseach gave it his "vigorous backing". (Note: The Economist speculated that the Irish walk-out from the EEC summit was a "dramatic—and damaging"—attempt to reassure his Irish nationalist constituency that, although he may in their eyes have given in too easily over McGlinchey's extradition, FitzGerald was a staunch defender of Ireland's national and international interests.)

A month after McGlinchey's capture, The Economist suggested that McGlinchey faced "only a single, seven-year-old murder charge, which could be hard to prove". (Note: The magazine commented that McGlinchey's case "will have to be handled with all the safeguards of the law, however keenly the police forces of both countries want to throw the book at him".) While he was on remand, McGlinchey's daughter Maíre died of meningitis. He was released on parole to attend her funeral in Bellaghy. Nearly six months after his extradition, McGlinchey appeared in court for the murder of Hester McMullan in December 1984. Five crown witnesses failed to appear, but the Crown used McGlinchey's own admissions to the SCC regarding his IRA activity as evidence. On Christmas Eve Justice Hutton sentenced McGlinchey to life imprisonment. (Note: M. P. P. Simon notes a number of unusual aspects to the trial: After the case opened on 10 December 1984, the presiding judge, Lord Justice Kelly, dismissed himself because it had been brought to his attention that he had already been involved in a case in 1979 which concerned the 1977 killing at issue in this case. Secondly, the evidence against McGlinchey had changed dramatically from, the evidence presented to the Supreme Court in Dublin in March 1984. Most importantly, in Dublin there had been no mention of McGlinchey's membership in a paramilitary organization or of the fact that his alleged victim, Mrs Hester McMullen, was connected with the security forces (her son was a member of the Royal Ulster Constabulary (RUC) reserve and her daughter worked at the RUC station in Ballymena, Northern Ireland). Some lawyers have argued that had these facts been known while the jurisdiction warrant was being processed in the Republic's courts, there would have been little chance of McGlinchey's extradition.") Following what Arizona jurist Michael P. P. Simon calls a "controversial and politically sensitive decision", Coogan says that it then "soon became clear that the Northern authorities had little or no evidence" on which to hold McGlinchey. He was released by Court of Appeal in Belfast the following year. Lord Justice Gibson found that McGlinchey's previous confession to the Garda regarding his IRA membership did not necessarily mean that he was involved in every action the IRA carried out in the area. Further, Gibson ruled that the fingerprints that had been found on the getaway car could have been placed on the vehicle up to 30-hours after Hester's death. Both McGlinchey's confession to membership, and his fingerprints, said Gibson in a 45-minute judgment, were thus inadmissible as evidence. (Note: The failure of the British to present a solid case against McGlinchey contributed to the Irish government's amendment to the Extradition Act in 1987. The government wrote the commentator Robin Wilson, suspected that "speculative extradition warrants were being issued for interrogation purposes", and cites McGlinchey as being "exotically linked to 28 murders...none of which could be pinned on him when he was extradited".)

=== Return to the Republic ===
Having been the first republican to have been extradited from the south to the north, on 11 October 1985 he also became the first person to be re-extradited from the north back. The leader of Sinn Féin, Gerry Adams, later joked in Fortnight magazine that the Catholic Church was insistent that "although reports that Mr McGlinchey was seen to move have been verified by many observers, his movements back and forth across the border do not meet the conditions used to describe a miracle". McGlinchey was handed back to the Gardaí at the Killeen border crossing, and immediately re-arrested on charges relating to the Clare siege. As well as Gardaí Special Branch armed with Uzis, McGlinchey was greeted by spectators with placards, note Holland and McDonald. Of these read céad míle fáilte, while another said "Welcome home, Daddy". By this point, argues Coogan, "the pendulum of public opinion had swung back towards him considerably". His photograph had appeared in the news often enough for the "Mad Dog" image to appear a misnomer, and his wife and young children were photogenic.

McGlinchey was convicted at the Special Criminal Court in March 1986 for firearms offences from two years earlier. The presiding judge, Mr Justice MacMahon commented during his sentencing that "it was to his credit" that MvGlinchey had not fired on the Gardaí although having had many opportunities to do so. (Note: McGlinchey had previously stated that he would not be taken alive, and Coogan argues that "had [McGlinchey] wished it, he could have accounted for some of the Gardai in the Co. Clare gunbattle".) McGlinchey was sent to Portlaoise for 10 years, where he became a model prisoner, immersing himself in the study of constitutional and extradition law, on which he became expert. As a result, he became an informal advisor to other prisoners and was able to dismiss his barristers and prosecute his own appeals. (Note: His own personally-prepared defence, which took several months to prepare, consisted of 64 points argued over 150 pages, noted the Sunday Tribune.) The Supreme Court advised McGlinchey to seek payment of the state aid paid to defence counsel as he was acting on his own behalf. McGlinchey's appeals failed in Ireland and then also in the European Court of Human Rights. He then appealed to the Supreme Court again, on the new grounds that the 1981 warrant from Belfast was flawed. Justice Declan Costello initially agreed, noting that the police officer upon whose oath it had been issued had failed to sign it as he should have. However, said Costello, there were sufficient safeguards in the extradition process to have allowed McGlinchey to have presented this evidence on an earlier occasion; he had not done so, and the appeal was therefore dismissed. Dillon suggests that during this period of imprisonment, McGlinchey reconsidered the direction of his life, resolving to retire from military activity and become a family man. On the outside, though, McGlinchey was beginning to be seen as a potential leader for a disaffected group of Provisionals from the East Tyrone Brigade. (Note: The East Tyrone Brigade, under the command of Jim Lynagh, followed a Maoist military strategy throughout much of the early- to mid-1980s, whereby they attempted to create no-go areas for the security services. Lynagh's strategy was rejected by Chief of Staff, Kevin McKenna. McKenna's relationship with members of the East Tyrone Brigade—particularly Pádraig McKearney—had been poor since the early 1980s grew steadily worse. It was McKearney who put out feelers towards McGlinchey.) McGlinchey, they knew, "had even less regard for the Adams leadership than the East Tyrone men".

== INLA feuding ==
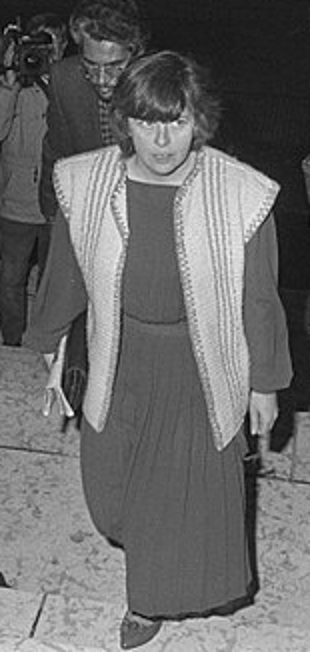
Bernadette McAliskey photographed in 1986

While McGlinchey was in Portlaoise he could not control external events. In December 1985 members of the INLA in the north were released after their convictions in the supergrass trials, including a previous chief of staff, Gerard Steenson. Many of them—already distrustful of each other after Kirkpatrick's many allegations and the "dirty laundry aired" as a result—came into conflict with each other as they attempt to retake the positions in the group. Their conflict soon descended into a violent feud, with the INLA effectively splitting into four distinct factions. The mass-imprisonments following Kirkpatrick's evidence had been extremely damaging for the INLA, and between December 1986 to March 1987 there were 12 deaths—including much of the IRSP and INLA leadership—and many more injuries in an increasingly bloody feud.

=== Killing of Mary McGlinchey ===
Mary — called "Mrs Mad Dog" by the ex-soldier and writer Ken Wharton (Note: She was wanted by the RUC for the murders of six people, for acting as lookout at the Droppin Well, and for firing a fusillade over the coffins of INLA hunger strikers Patsy O'Hara and Kevin Lynch in May 1981.) — may have continued to organise her husband's operation while he was incarcerated, perhaps even running it. Publicly, she appears to have distanced herself from political activity (notwithstanding, noted The Sunday Tribune, that "her window displayed a Sinn Féin election poster"). She probably supported the faction still controlled by her husband's man—"Jap" O'Reilly—in the INLA's faction feuding but not to the extent of playing a direct role.

On 1 February 1987, at around 9:20 pm, at the family home in Dundalk, she was bathing their two children upstairs when two balaclava-clad men broke into through the back door and ran upstairs. They fired at Mary with automatic weapons, shooting her in the face. Declan, the eldest child, escaped out of the house and raised the neighbours, who found Mary shot, with her head in the bath. Regional newspaper The Argus later reported that the killing "caused shock waves in the town".

RTÉ reported the next day that McGlinchey had been asleep in the ground floor block of Portlaoise's E-Wing—which housed, in part, "members and former members of the INLA"—when prison authorities were informed of his wife's killing. (Note: E-Wing of Portlaoise Prison traditionally held Republican prisoners rather than "ordinary", non-aligned convicted men.) McGlinchey was awakened and moved to another section of the prison, where he was given the news. RTÉ reported that "the prison authorities refused to disclose what his reaction was", that being personal information. When asked whether his move had been because McGlinchey was considered to be in danger among other INLA men, the prison official said it was "prudent and in the best interests of everyone". The McGlinchey children were taken into care by Brigid Makowski, who had been their legal guardian. Mary's inquest was delayed for three months as McGlinchey's counsel argued he had only been informed two days earlier and had not had sufficient time to instruct him.

Holland and McDonald argue that "because [McGlinchey] was the personification of all that happened to the INLA from 1982 to early 1984, those who suffered under his reign blamed McGlinchey personally." Many people—including some republicans—wanted him dead. She is known to have taken an active part in McGlinchey's activities; the RUC wished to question her in the matter of 20 deaths, and had made enemies of her own, particularly by luring victims for her husband's execution squads. The method of her murder also, says Dillon, "implied personal revenge". With McGlinchey in enforced absence in Portlaoise, it is likely that her killers took advantage of the chaos of the INLA feud to settle an old score. Although it is unclear what was requested and what was denied, Holland and McDonald state that McGlinchey applied for permission to attend her funeral. (Note: This is disputed by a brother-in-law of McGlinchey's, reported Irish Times journalist Mary Holland, who reported the unnamed brother-in-law as saying "Mr McGlinchey's family did not request that he be allowed to attend his wife's funeral, or even the removal of her remains. What they asked for was that he might be given the opportunity...to see his wife's body".) This was refused by the Department of Justice on the grounds of the security risk. (Note: Logistically it would have been involved transporting McGlinchey to Bellaghy, where Mary was to be buried. The Gardaí had no jurisdiction north of the border and the RUC no grounds on which to hold him. The case remained open over 20 years later.) McGlinchey was reported as being "devastated" by her death. Although the Justice Department offered him the opportunity to hear a private service for his wife within the prison—with his children and close friend Bernadette Devlin McAliskey attending—McGlinchey refused, demanding he be allowed to attend the funeral.

Mary may have been killed by the same gang that would later be responsible for McGlinchey's death, part of a "long-running feud", suggested a group of Belfast journalists researching the conflict's mortality rate. It may also have been over money. Coogan suggests that her killers—who blamed her for the part she played in the deaths of McMahon and Mackin—flew from the United States the day before and having shot her with borrowed guns, "were back on a plane to America the next day". The Gardaí and the INLA judged it an IPLO operation, and within a few days the latter had assassinated one of that group. The IRSP concurred, their spokesman Kevin Quillan saying in a radio interview the next day that they "could quite clearly state that we would lay the blame for this brutal murder at the door of the so-called IPLO, one of the factions of these dissident groupings", and further suggested that the IPLO received the assistance of British intelligence in attacking Mary McGlinchey. Her death appears to have been unconnected with it. McGlinchey wanted to investigate Mary's death, but he was hampered by the fact that no-one was willing to discuss it with him while the feud continued. Her death also put an end to the contact between the INLA and the disaffected elements of the East Tyrone Brigade who had contacted McGlinchey. After their mother's death, Declan and Dominic lived with their maternal and paternal grandparents, in Toomebridge and Bellaghy respectively.

Following his wife's death, McGlinchey released a statement from Portlaoise in which he denounced the INLA's feud and said that neither he nor Mary had had any dealings with the group since his incarceration begun. He said there was no reason for any organisation to play any part in her funeral. (Note: Notwithstanding McGlinchey's remarks, a wreath was left on Mary's grave supposedly from the INLA's "new Headquarters" staff.)

In October 1992 McGlinchey applied for temporary parole to see his children over the public holiday, but the request was turned down on security grounds. Two months later he applied again, this time to spend five days over Christmas with them. This request was accepted. McGlinchey was released for good in March the following year. He had served seven years of his 10-year sentence. He announced his intention of refocussing the INLA's efforts on investigating the money laundering activities of the UVF and its connections with Irish gangsterism. Still politically hardline, he condemned the Hume–Adams talks, as well as the Downing Street Declaration, which he considered a betrayal of the republican ethos.

== Later career ==
Following his release, McGlinchey lived temporarily in Dublin and then moved to 62 Meadowview, south Drogheda. He found part-time work in a nearby supermarket. He spent time with his children, taking them on holiday to the Aran Islands. (Note: This, with Connemara, comprised Ireland's Irish-speaking Galway Gaeltacht.) The journalist Maggie O'Kane later described McGlinchey's last days: "Since his release from prison last year he had lived on the east coast of Ireland in the town of Drogheda in a house attached to Thornton's grocer's shop and video store. Locals tended to boycott it when they heard McGlinchey had arrived. They believed his occasional appearances at the counter were a cover for a new armed gang he was forming in the Republic". His old organisation, meanwhile, had continued its campaign, on his release, attempting—but failing—to kill a UVF man in north Belfast in January 1993, for example.

If McGlinchey had decided to turn his back on armed struggle, suggests Dillon, within a short space of time he discovered that his enemies had not. In June 1993, he was driving to his son Dominic's birthday party in Newtowndarver, Dundalk. A car pulled up next to him, and McGlinchey, probably thinking it was the Gardaí, approached it. A man with a machine gun got out, but as he was cocking the weapon, McGlinchey grabbed hold of it: a short of fire skimmed McGlinchey's head, but the weapon jammed. The attacker then drew a pistol, with a number of shots hitting McGlinchey; he, however, was able to take cover in a shrubbery. Coogan comments that one of McGlinchey's children ran after the car to take its number. Although McGlinchey survived the attack, a bullet was lodged in his skull. This and others were removed under surgery. McGlinchey was kept under armed guard while recovering in hospital.

The identity of the gunmen is unknown. McGlinchey, at different times, blamed both British Intelligence—he said his attackers had English accents—and the Loyalist leader Billy Wright, whom McGlinchey had previously attempted to assassinate. The IPLO also claimed responsibility, although McGlinchey rejected the suggestion. Reiterating his view that British intelligence was responsible, he claimed that "the only people who would gain from me going home to Bellaghy in a box were the British". McKittrick suggests that there was much contemporaneous speculation as to the involvement of South Armagh republicans. Others have also suggested that it was a UVF operation, or perhaps carried out by friends of Sparky Barkley. Holland and McDonald comment, however, that:

The choice of venue to gun down one of Ireland's most notorious paramilitary figures...pointed to the real identity of the gang. It was not an accident that they had chosen the spot near Ardee, County Louth, because it was there that he assumed the leadership of the INLA almost exactly ten years before.

Notwithstanding his disowning of the INLA, McGlinchey, it seems, also had scores to settle, for both the attack on him and the death of his wife. When he was released from Portlaoise he said he had a death-list naming 15 enemies. Some contemporaries, though, have stated that he appears to have mellowed after Mary's death. He had moved to Drogheda and was now living in near-anonymity; few of his neighbours were aware of his past. He may have felt that having effectively left the INLA, his enemies would forget him—or at least, argues Dillon, not risk travelling that far into the Republic of Ireland to target him. He was still involved with the movement ideologically, however, and with McAliskey, he was working on a draft constitution for a united Ireland. (Note: McAliskey—née Devlin—had helped form the Irish Republican Socialist Party with Seamus Costello in 1974. She never joined the INLA, and while she served on the IRSP's national executive in 1975, she resigned in 1976 when a proposal that the INLA become subordinate to the IRSP executive was defeated.) Comments Dolan, "although there were some suggestions that he was trying to assemble a new republican unit and returning to the racketeering he had engaged in throughout the 1980s, he strongly denied it". For their part, the Gardaí believed him responsible for a number of armed robberies that took place in Counties Louth and Tipperary in early 1994. According to McGlinchey's son Dominic, speaking in 2014, his father was working alongside a senior Provisional IRA man investigating links between a corrupt IRA unit and the UVF in Dublin.

== Death ==
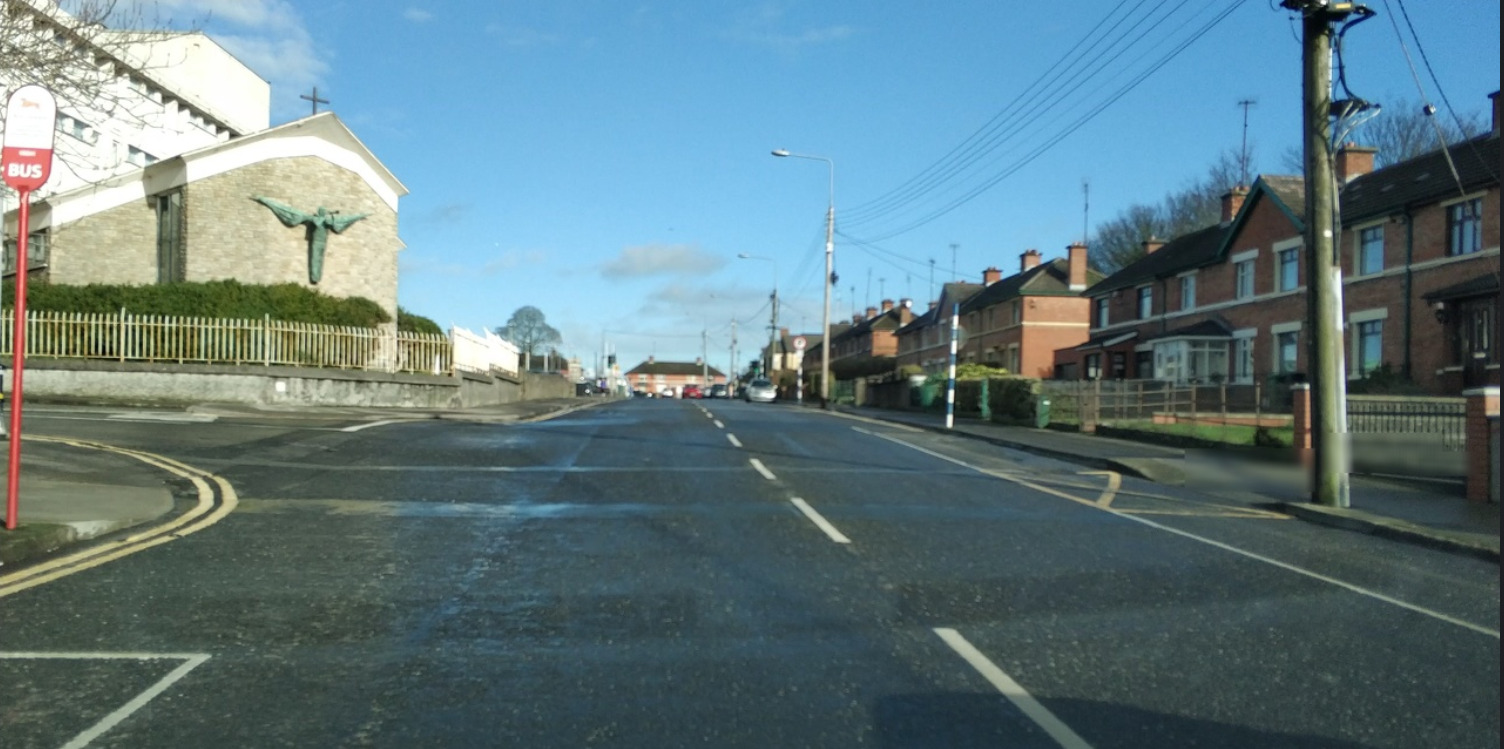
Maggie O'Kane described the scene of McGlinchey's death in Drogheda: "On the wall of a nurses' home overlooking the scene, an outstretched angel surveyed his final moments...[his son ran] to one of the red-bricked houses that line Hardman's Gardens".

In Northern Ireland, by spring 1994, writes Moloney, "the violence continued apace...with both republicans and loyalists killing freely". The INLA's 1986–1987 feud had also reignited. Sinn Féin was promoting a strategy of peace to the IRA and the mainstream republican movement. (Note: Adams had been granted a 48-hour visa to fly to the United States and meet President Clinton, on the strength of this.) A former Provisional explained to Dillon why McGlinchey was more vulnerable than he probably realised. Part of McGlinchey's problem, the volunteer said, was that after his release he "no longer had a terrorist group to protect him". The source said that, without the safe-houses, the intelligence reports, the support network and the instinctive security precautions that had guided his life on the run, he had become "as vulnerable as some of those people [he] used to target. That was McGlinchey's problem. He failed to understand that he'd become a sitting duck". The journalist Fergal Keane wrote that by the time of McGlinchey's death, "there was no-one left in the organisation to protect him".

At around 9:30 on the evening of Thursday, 10 February 1994, McGlinchey had visited friends of his in Duleek Road, near his home, and dined there. He left around forty minutes later, intending to take a video back to a shop in Brookville, on the north side of town. McGlinchey later described his father's demeanour that night as "agitated and emotionally upset". He said he asked his father whether he believed he was in danger from the IRA, to which McGlinchey replied "I am just sick of my name being blackened by men who never fired a shot...no, the IRA would never kill me, son". At around 11 pm McGlinchey and the 16-year-old Dominic were returning home, when—"for reasons never made clear", says Dillon—McGlinchey pulled up to make a phone call from a public kiosk on Hardman's Gardens, near Lourdes Hospital. Almost immediately—despite the presence of four witnesses—a red Mazda pulled up alongside him. (Note: The Mazda arrived in Hardman's Gardens from the direction of Drogheda and headed north after the killing.) While his son watched from the car, three men got out and beat McGlinchey. Once McGlinchey was on the ground the men—who were armed with three pump action shotguns and a pistol—fired into him 14 times. The attack finished with a coup de grâce to the head, although he was dead already. His last words were reputed to be "Jesus, Mary help me"; his son yelled for an ambulance. According to the first officer on the scene, Dominic junior told her, "it's my dad, it's my dad, he's been shot. Quick, get up the checkpoints". "The horrifying impact of witnessing such cold brutality on McGlinchey's son can only be guessed at", observe Holland and McDonald.

The following day, an autopsy was carried out in Our Lady of Lourdes Hospital, which showed McGlinchey had been hit in the neck, skull, the left upper chest, the left arm, and both legs. His inquest was held in Drogheda two weeks later, suspended and then reopened in November 1996. Gardaí forensic officers told the coroner that they had compared the cartridge casings they had found with the database but no matches had been made to other weapons; the officer noted that no such information had been received from the RUC. The shotguns used were impossible to trace ballistically, but it had been ascertained that the Mazda was registered in the north. Bernadette McAliskey made a statement for the family, in which she condemned the Gardaí's investigation into the McGlinchey's killing and suggested that the killers were two known UVF men from the north. Further, she said

Despite the fact that he was himself under constant Garda surveillance, despite a previous attempt on his life and the existence of photo fit identification of two assailants in that attempt and the fact that they bear an uncanny resemblance to two known members of the UVF in the North, it is inconceivable to the McGlinchey family that the Gardai have been unable to keep any, further progress in this inquiry.

The Gardaí stated that they were not watching McGlinchey, and that "he was not hiding. He drove his car around the town and was known to us here." They also stated that they did not believe that he had been engaged in criminal conspiracies or activities. Keane directly linked McGlinchey's and his wife's deaths to the killings of McMahon and Mackin years before. Keane suggests that an associate of the dead men had already returned to Dundalk in 1989—when it had seemed as if McGlinchey's appeal might be successful—from abroad and had been open about his intentions if McGlinchey was released. Following McGlinchey's death, a number of stories appeared in the Irish press accusing him of drug dealing (Note: For example, says Coogan, the Sunday Independent on 13 December 1994.) and other crimes, such as fencing stolen lorries from the border region. Coogan asserts that these stories were the product of Garda Special Branch press briefings.

=== Funeral ===
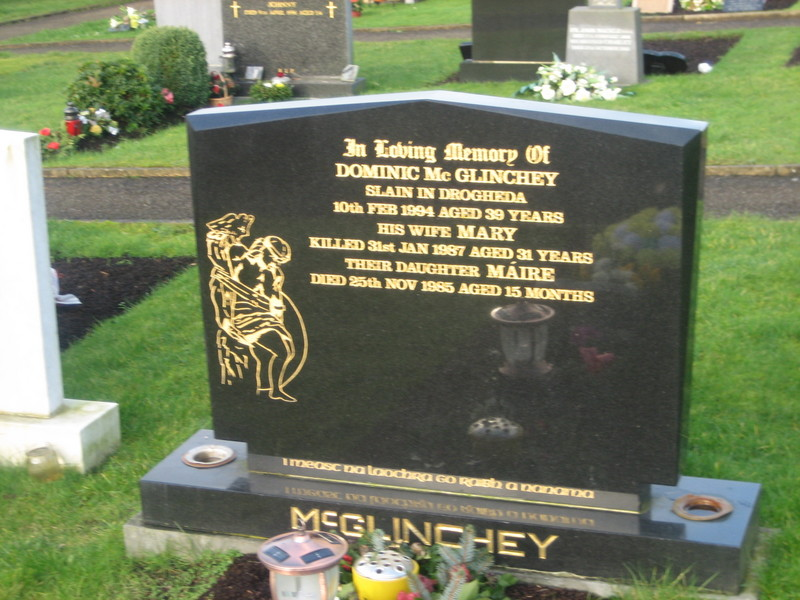
Grave of Dominic, Mary and Máire McGlinchey in Bellaghy

McGlinchey was buried in Bellaghy. Around 60 mourners, mostly family, saw off his body from Drogheda before the journey north. McAliskey kissed the coffin, which was carried by her, Sean McGlinchey, Dominic junior and Father O'Daly, who had given McGlinchey the last rites on Hardman's Gardens. The hearse was accompanied by what the Gardaí described as a "low key" security operation. Their spokesman said "we did not wish to flood the scene with Gardaí or there would have been more of them than mourners".

McGlinchey's funeral was held on 13 February 1994 in Bellaghy, with no republican accoutrements. There was no INLA colour party, and only an Irish tricolor draped over the coffin. Over 1,500 people attended watched closely by 200 RUC. Police armoured vans were held on the perimeter. McGlinchey was buried alongside Mary and their young daughter Máire. His coffin was carried from the McGlinchey family home to St Mary's Church by pall-bearers who were swapped out from the crowd every 40-yards or so. Martin McGuinness was among them, as was Bernadette McAliskey and her daughter Róisín. (Note: A photograph of the McAliskeys carrying McGlinchey's coffin has been described by the researcher Robin Whitaker as "an iconic image of the troubles".) McGlinchey's sons carried the coffin for the final yards; comments Keane, "Dominic and Declan McGlinchey have seen more than most because of the troubles in Northern Ireland". The priest, Father Michael Flanagan, condemned what he called the media's glorification of McGlinchey's killing, telling the crowd "no-one deserved to die like that. There's a little bit of good in the worst of us and a little bit of bad in the best." Dillon's anonymous Provisional source confirmed that McGuinness's presence at the funeral indicated the high-standing as a soldier in which the IRA held McGlinchey, despite its disapproval of his organisation. McGlinchey's grave had a flagpole next to it from which a Tricolour flew after the burial. His grave lies a short distance from that of Francis Hughes, who had died on hunger strike in May 1981. (Note: Another hunger striker, Thomas McElwee, is also buried in the same graveyard.) Bernadette McAliskey gave the graveside oration, which effectively eulogised McGlinchey. She condemned the recent press coverage which had accused McGlinchey of drug dealing and criminality and said of the journalists responsible that they were

Curs and dogs. May every one of them rot in hell. They have taken away Dominic McGlinchey's character and they will stand judgement for it. He was the finest republican of them all. He never dishonoured the cause he believed in. His war was with the armed soldiers and the police of this state.

Following this speech, some of the mourners turned on the observing press corps and shouted abuse, reported The Times. A couple of months after the funeral, McAliskey later explained her thinking to The Guardian. Their reporter, David Sharrock, asked if her tirade had been intended to counteract the negative stories about McGlinchey that had recently appeared in the press. McAliskey said

It's very difficult to conduct a conversation about a person who bore no resemblance in the media to the person I knew for 10 years. His thinking was just fundamentally democratic and to acknowledge that Dominic McGlinchey had an intellect was to acknowledge the reality of this conflict here. Republicanism is not simply anti-partitionist and confined to Ireland. It is a tradition of secular egalitarian democracy. So yes. Dominic was the finest republican of his generation. The rest of it I might take back...I don't even believe in hell.

In the New Statesman the following month, the journalist and political activist Eamonn McCann—discussing Sinn Féin's "search for respectability"—considered the speech of his "old comrade" McAliskey, (Note: McCann and McAliskey had been founding-members of People's Democracy in 1968, and they have both supported each other's electoral efforts over the years, with McCann as McAliskey's press officer, she as his election agent.) which he said he had been "taken aback by the ferocity" of. However, said McCann, in context this was less surprising than should otherwise have been expected. The press coverage of McGlinchey's death, argued McCann, suggested that "the killing had been a good thing [and] the details of how he died were recounted with undisguised relish". The focus, he said, was on portraying McGlinchey was different from the brand of Irish republicanism that was increasingly becoming part of mainstream political discourse.

== Family and personal life ==
McGlinchey was raised a Catholic and remained so for the rest of his life, although he described himself as a "believing one" rather than a practising one. (Note: McGlinchey expressed himself critical of the Pope, John Paul II. While touring Ireland a few years earlier, the Pope had begged on bended knees for the violence in the north to stop. McGlinchey later commented that he didn't "see the Pope as an authoritative moral figure. He is very misinformed, and about other struggles throughout the world. For instance, he blessed the Guatemalan government and the Salvadorian government but he didn't bless the Nicaraguan government. He is a very conservative man. I certainly wouldn't take to heart his plea for peace".)

While imprisoned, on 5 July 1975 McGlinchey married Mary, daughter of Patrick O'Neil from Toomebridge. The author Ed Moloney describes her as a "formidable" woman, who became an "experienced and ruthless operator in her own right". Dominic and Mary had two sons, Declan, born in 1978, and Dominic, who was a year younger. They also had a daughter Maíre, in 1985; she died of meningitis the following year.

Three of McGlinchey's brothers joined the IRA. Sean was convicted of the 1973 Coleraine bombings and received a life sentence; he became a Sinn Féin councillor after the Belfast Agreement. Paul was jailed for 14 years after attempting to assassinate the Reverend Overend in 1976—whom the INLA would later try and blow up on McGlinchey's orders; he later stood against Sinn Féin in the 2007 Assembly election. A third brother, Michael, was convicted of IRA membership. McGlinchey's son Declan was also active in the republican socialist movement and remained living in Bellaghy. In 2009 he was arrested and investigated under suspicion of involvement in the Real IRA's attack on Masereene Barracks. Declan died of a suspected heart attack in Bellaghy on 31 October 2015. He was given what the Irish News described as a "paramilitary-style funeral", involving a masked colour party and a gun salute the night before. His brother, Dominic Óg (Note: Óg is an Irish adjectival epithet meaning "young", and is most often used to distinguish a son from the father where they share a common given name.) supported the Adams-McGuinness Sinn Féin leadership until 2007, when they endorsed the PSNI. He has been critical of the party since, describing them as "not too different to that of any corporate company". Since then, however, he has stated that he does not "see mass appetite at a street level for the armed campaign", and has stated his wish to "start to have a conversation about the removal of the gun from Irish politics" with dissident groups. He is also involved in broader left-wing activism such as opposition to the Iraq War. Dominic, like Declan, was also named in court as having been implicated in the Masereerne attack, which he denied. On his father's death, Dominic Óg is reported as believing that McGlinchey was killed in order to remove a potential obstacle to the burgeoning Peace Process. (Note: He notes that it occurred six months prior to the IRA's 1994 ceasefire. Specifically, he holds one of three parties culpable: the IRA themselves, British intelligence or agents of the Irish government, official or otherwise. He argues, "there were no ballistics, no cars, no nothing. Everybody [involved] disappears off the face of the planet.")

== Aftermath and legacy ==
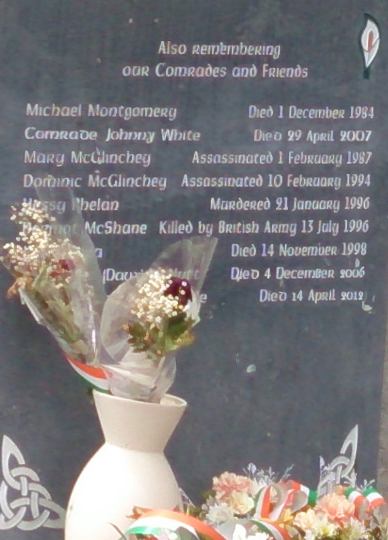
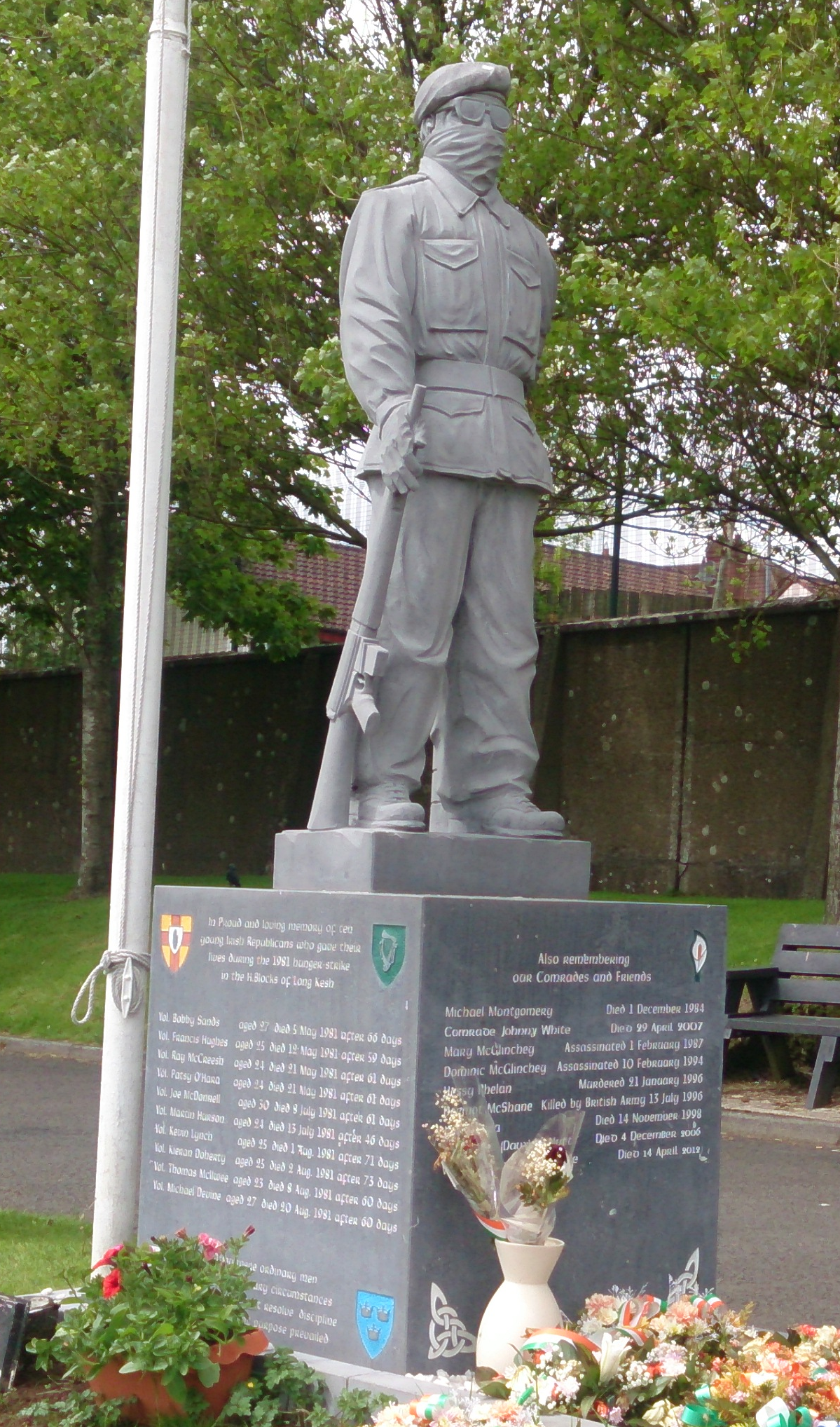

=== Aftermath ===
McGlinchey's death did not stop the INLA's internal feuding, and by this point, says Coogan, it had also turned to drug dealing and racketeering. In 1996, another INLA chief of staff—Gino Gallagher—was also shot dead, probably by a rival faction. This led to a further bloody feud. McGlinchey had "helped keep the INLA on the map after the hunger strike", says Davies, and Holland and McDonald suggest that the INLA's fragmentation after his death indicates McGlinchey's importance to the organisation. They argued that he acted as "a makeshift bolt"; while he was alive, and particularly while he was operational, the bolt had held the component parts of the group together. But with his death, "that terror machine finally broke into disparate parts. The descent into chaos had begun." Although the armed struggle continued, it was generally ineffectual. The INLA cast itself as defenders of the Catholic community and tried to take the war to Loyalism. However, over the next few years the group killed over 40 civilians and 10 of its own volunteers while accounting for only five loyalists.

=== Legacy ===
The scholar Arwel Ellis Owen has blamed McGlinchey for the INLA's subsequent descent into factionalism, which he argues was a direct result of McGlinchey's being on the run throughout his leadership. His enforced absence, Owen suggests, prevented him from taking day-to-day control. (Note: As a result, says Owen, "it broke up into various factions which competed for position by carrying out spectacular atrocities or shows of violence".) This was particularly caused by McGlinchey's emasculation of the Army Council and collective decision-making processes; when he left, there was no-one to fill the vacuum his departure created. The INLA's increased focus on internecine feuding also distracted them their political or strategic aims. and McGlinchey has also been criticised for failing to support the political struggle waged by the IRSP. Their finances were consistently low or non-existent and they relied on the military wing to provide them with funds. Little was forthcoming, in spite of the INLA's numerous successful robberies. McGlinchey appears, therefore, to have had little interest in any form of struggle other than the military. This was despite, note Holland and McDonald, of concerns raised by seasoned INLA men such as Harry Flynn and Gerry Roche that socialist politics and activity was fundamental to the existence of both groups. (Note: As a result of the IRSP's sidelining, in 1983, its only two full-time employees at the Dublin head office both resigned with the office effectively shutting down as a result.) Despite McGlinchey's claim that his priority for the republican socialist movement to provide "political leadership on the class struggle in Ireland", argues the author Daniel Finn, politics "withered on the vine" under his command. McGlinchey, commented the author Thomas G. Mitchell, "had minimal interest in the party. Instead, he wanted to ake the INLA the most ruthless and feared terrorist group in Northern Ireland." Although McAliskey praised the memory of McGlinchey, in practical terms, suggest Holland and McDonald, his "effect on the organisation Mrs McAliskey once supported was negative", and his legacy should be seen as division and paranoia within the INLA, they suggest. It is possible that, before he was killed, McGlinchey had come to regret leaving the IRA. One of their ex-volunteers told Dillon that had McGlinchey remained with the Provisionals, they "would have stood him down from active service. He'd probably still be alive and part of the peace process." Alternatively, it has been suggested that McGlinchey had already been identified by elements within the IRA opposed to Sinn Féin's peace strategy as a potential future rallying point for dissidents.

Dermot Finucane, brother of murdered Belfast solicitor Pat Finucane, later told the investigative author Kevin Toolis that the "Wanted" posters put up about McGlinchey and Hughes influenced him to join the IRA in 1978. Finucane told Toolis how "I remember seeing Dominic McGlinchey and Ian Milne and Francis Hughes 'Wanted' posters when they were on the run as the most wanted men in Ulster, and I remember mentally saying: 'That is what you want, you want to inflict so much damage on the enemy they want you badly'". McGlinchey was commemorated in the INLA wing of the Maze Prison with a mural on a communal wall. McGlinchey is portrayed in a black beret and against a fiery background and a silhouetted hillside. The caption read "Comrade Dominic McGlinchey. Proudly remembered by the INLA POWs. Long Kesh". (Note: Rolston visited the prison and photographed Republican murals between 1998 and 1999. Other INLA leaders, such as Gino Gallagher, were also memorialised in the prison this way.) Similarly, the scholar Paul K. Clare said that, while researching public opinion in Northern Ireland, he asked a group of young men in Turf Lodge "if there was any one individual who they admired more than anyone else. 'Mad Dog' McGlinchey" was their reply." (Note: Clare suggests that this was in spite of the men having no "real interest in the Republican movement"; they considered McGlinchey's activities merely "a good thing to do".) Such views, argues Clare, were "not so uncommon that they would be considered abnormal".

== Personality and reputation ==
=== Personality and approach ===
The author Martin Dillon met McGlinchey in the mid-1980s and described him as "six feet tall, and lean, with a receding hairline. In his 30s, his slightly rounded face gave him the look of a much younger man." (Note: Dillon says that, as expected, he did not look like he was presented in the media, which used "archetypal arrest photos [making] every suspect resemble an unshaven maniac".) Coogan also visited McGlinchey in Portlaoise and wrote that he appeared "tired, reduced by his past and by prison". He had a tricolour tattoo on his left forearm. The Gardaí later described McGlinchey as vain, and enjoying melodrama. Edna O'Brien described him as "most reflective and at the same time most forthcoming". She later told Marianne Heron of the Irish Independent that she had told McGlinchey "that she liked everything about him except what he was [and] he told her that his mother said the same thing". O'Brien also denied ever having an affair with McGlinchey; she claimed later that, as a result of her research for a book, she had to refute questions as to whether she "had love affairs with republicans". (Note: According to the Gardaí, McGlinchey was "said to have once paused while on the run to scrawl his name in lipstick on the mirror of a farmhouse he knew the police would search", although it was later suggested in The Guardian that this was a means of "taunting" his pursuers.) His reputation, suggests the writer Jonathan Stevenson, became that of "fabled killer", while Coogan describes him as "a latter-day Ned Kelly", as committed to republicanism as Frances Hughes yet with far greater notoriety. He was also, suggest Holland and McDonald, "probably the most famous and most charismatic INLA chief of staff since Séamus Costello". Where Costello ruled by collective agreement, though, McGlinchey ruled by decree; his tenure as INLA chief of staff has been summed up as "brutal, authoritarian, but nonetheless still relatively cohesive" by researcher Gary Ackerman.

McGlinchey, at his own estimate, killed "around...30" people in his career, of whom all but one, he said, were members of the security forces; (Note: The exception, he said, was "Dale, the informer".) the historian Keith Jeffery has calculated that McGlinchey was responsible for 28 murders, 30 bombings and 11 armed robberies. According to the journalist Nicholas Davies, his victims were "mainly officers of the RUC, the army and the UDR. He also murdered civilians." Holland and McDonald suggest that during his tenure as Chief of Staff McGlinchey "held the organisation together" at a time when it was expected to implode. McGlinchey, a contemporary said, "made his own luck", and Davies described McGlinchey as "a fearless man who would take extraordinary risks", particularly in his tactic of close-quarters engagements. The scholar C. M. Drake notes, however, that "where there is little protection for a human target...a close-quarter assassination is a simple option".

After his death, an IRSP spokesman, Fra Halligan defended McGlinchey's lack of political idealism, pointing out that he "wouldn't have had any problem saying [so] to you". For example, when Adams ideologically linked the republican campaign to the ANC's struggles in South Africa against Apartheid, McGlinchey is claimed to have said that, in rural nationalist areas "they don't know anything about Mandela but they see Brits in their fields and they don't like it". McGlinchey summed up his own approach as being "to do what had to be done and don't think about it thereafter". Although he was never completely unafraid, he said—"you need a certain amount of fear to keep you on edge"—he believed in controlling his fear and that, ultimately, he had a stronger motivation to fight than his enemy. He also claimed to take no pleasure in killing. During his interview with Vincent Browne, Browne asked him what his greatest regret was. After a pause, McGlinchey told him about a Protestant boy he had grown up with. The boy had joined the RUC and subsequently been killed by the IRA; "McGlinchey said he felt badly about that".

The ex-volunteer who spoke to Dillon also discussed McGlinchey's approach to various aspects of his leadership. He commented, for example, with regard to McGlinchey's views on informers ("a bullet in the head—no messing"), drugs (not tolerated), civilian casualties ("he would just say it was war") and sectarianism ("he took the view that if they killed our people, we should strike back but he didn't spend his time going around saying "let's kill all the Prods"). He concludes that McGlinchey "was not a holy Joe, but his main targets were the British war machine". A Gardaí source told The Times, "he lived by the gun and died by the gun. He was not a man who was going to die in his bed of old age". McGlinchey saw himself similarly. In an interview with the Starry Plough, he commented—when asked what the effect of his death or capture would have—that "the movement will not end with me. I'm only one individual, not God." He also refuted that he had ever, or ever would, become a legend, telling a journalist "I'm no Che Guevara, just an ordinary Irish republican socialist who is determined to strive for a free socialist Ireland". O'Kane compared his and his wife's cooperation as having a "touch of Bonnie and Clyde" about them, she wrote.

McGlinchey's falling out with the Provisionals in the late 1970s, commented an anonymous colleague, indicated that he could issue orders but was a very poor follower of them. (Note: On the other hand, IRA informer Sean O'Callaghan considers this to have been a trait that was common among those who became INLA leaders, saying how "they seemed to me to be particular kinds of characters, that they really weren't suited to being the smallish leaders. [Dominic] McGlinchey never took to orders, neither did Costello, neither did Gerard Steenson".) Other ex-comrades have since described him as "volatile and impulsive", and his approach to man-management as "if you're on the run you should be armed. If not, fuck off home." Another called him a "cunning countryman [who] liked to manipulate others but did not like to be in overall responsibility". His treatment of popular and previously loyal INLA men such as Barkley convinced many of those under him that he would brook no dissent or questioning of his orders. The result was bad news for the INLA's cohesion, as paranoia and fear became widespread. to the extent that, when attending Army Council meetings, say Holland and McDonald, some members would only go armed. However, they also argue, it could never be said of McGlinchey, as it could of so many of his colleagues, that his struggle was motivated by personal gain: he was motivated solely by ideology. One such fellow traveller of McGlinchey's later described the INLA leader thus:

He wasn't the mad dog the media talked about. He was very focussed. People would listen when he talked. He had a grasp of international politics and often discussed the agendas of other revolutionary movements. He wanted to see the INLA as part of an international socialist brigade. He was also a hard man and when anyone stepped out of line—God help him or her.

=== Reputation ===
Christopher S. Morrison of the University of Wisconsin-Madison describes McGlinchey as earning "a personal reputation for sheer readiness to murder that no single republican figure of the Troubles has come close to challenging". A lieutenant general in the British Army, Maurice Robert Johnston, later described McGlinchey as a "lunatic", and more of an enemy to the British government than Martin McGuinness. McGlinchey not only lacked McGuinness's restraint, said Johnston, but would "shoot his own mother and all the rest of it". McGlinchey's "Mad Dog" nickname was given him by the security services (Note: The same nickname was later used by the loyalist leader, Johnny Adair, who ran the UDA's Shankill Road units. His biography reports how As his picture was being taken at Castlereagh holding centre, he was asked whether the name on the photo card was correct. "That's right, I'm Mad Dog", he said. According to police notes of the conversation, 'a comment was passed that Mad Dog was Dominic McGlinchey [the INLA gunman]. Adair retorted, "The difference between me and McGlinchey is that he killed policemen but I kill taigs.")—the modern historian Ruán O'Donnell calls the term a "pejorative soubriquet"—who considered him a "psycho". Dillon suggests that, in reality, the army did not consider him a mad dog but a "committed terrorist who had proved...dangerous and unpredictable", while the investigative journalist Mark Urban says McGlinchey had "driven the INLA into active and reasonably effective terrorism". The former INLA Chief of Staff—who McGlinchey had failed to re-recruit in the late 1970s—later told how he was ultimately deterred when he considered the direction McGlinchey wanted to take the group in. Holland and Mcdonald tell how—the two men having shared a cell in Portlaoise for some time—the ex-chief considered McGlinchey to be "unpredictable", and that his involvement increased the likelihood of a bloodbath at some point. A Garda who knew McGlinchey during his last term of imprisonment said that notwithstanding the urbane, academic facade McGlinchey adopted, he was still "a complete dictator" who wanted to dominate all around him.

The label "Mad Dog", argue Holland and McDonald, is a misnomer: he was neither mad nor a dog. For example, they say, by the time of his death he was sufficiently well versed in the constitution—the result of his studies in Portlaoise—to cogently argue against the Downing Street Declaration, which was being negotiated shortly before he died. Republicans tended to ignore the "Mad Dog" and "psycho" tags, which they deemed to part of what they believed to be a normal British propaganda campaign, (Note: The psychologist Gavin Cameroon suggests "there is a tendency" for men like McGlinchey to be given such labels because they are seen as "apart from other people...in that they break the 'rules of engagement'".) albeit, says the author Gene Kerrigan, "in a cartoon fashion, as a bogeyman". Ackerman has argued that the fact McGlinchey was able to spend so long on the run demonstrates the level of support he enjoyed in the countryside. Another of McGlinchey's Portlaoise companions argued that he was comparable to the hero of a previous generation of republicans, O'Donovan Rossa, while the literary critic Richard Pine has called McGlinchey's career of violence part of the continuing republican theme, arguing that the "'religion of ecstasy' which carried Emmet, Pearse and Plunkett through the blood-sacrifice has also...sustained Terence McSwiney in 1920, the hunger-strikers in Long Kesh and sustain[ed] Dominic McGlinchey". McCann argued that McGlinchey "wasn't way out of line with, and can't be cast from, the mainstream history of nationalist Ireland".

At his last trial, McGlinchey's defence counsel argued that, like thousands of others of his generation, "but for the fact that he was born in the community of South Derry, it is highly unlikely that he would ever be before any court". Holland and McDonald believed that McGlinchey would have known he would not meet with a peaceful death. On one occasion he stated his belief that "I will be remembered for nothing. I have no illusions about myself. There is no glory or anything to this. The only people who will remember me will be my family and particularly my children." It is possible that the June 1993 assassination attempt had brought out a fatalistic quality in him, for during one interview he commented on his nickname, saying "what do you do with a Mad Dog except put it down?". Before his death, he told a local detective "you either hide or you go on living as long as you can". Vincent Browne asked McGlinchey what he thought would happen to him eventually. McGlinchey answered:

I will probably get shot. There is a good possibility of my not seeing the end of the struggle. I could be lucky but just because I have been set up by the media as the most wanted man in Ireland, I suppose that increases the chances of my getting done in. But I don't really give it a lot of thought, I always try to avoid being shot.

== Cultural depictions ==
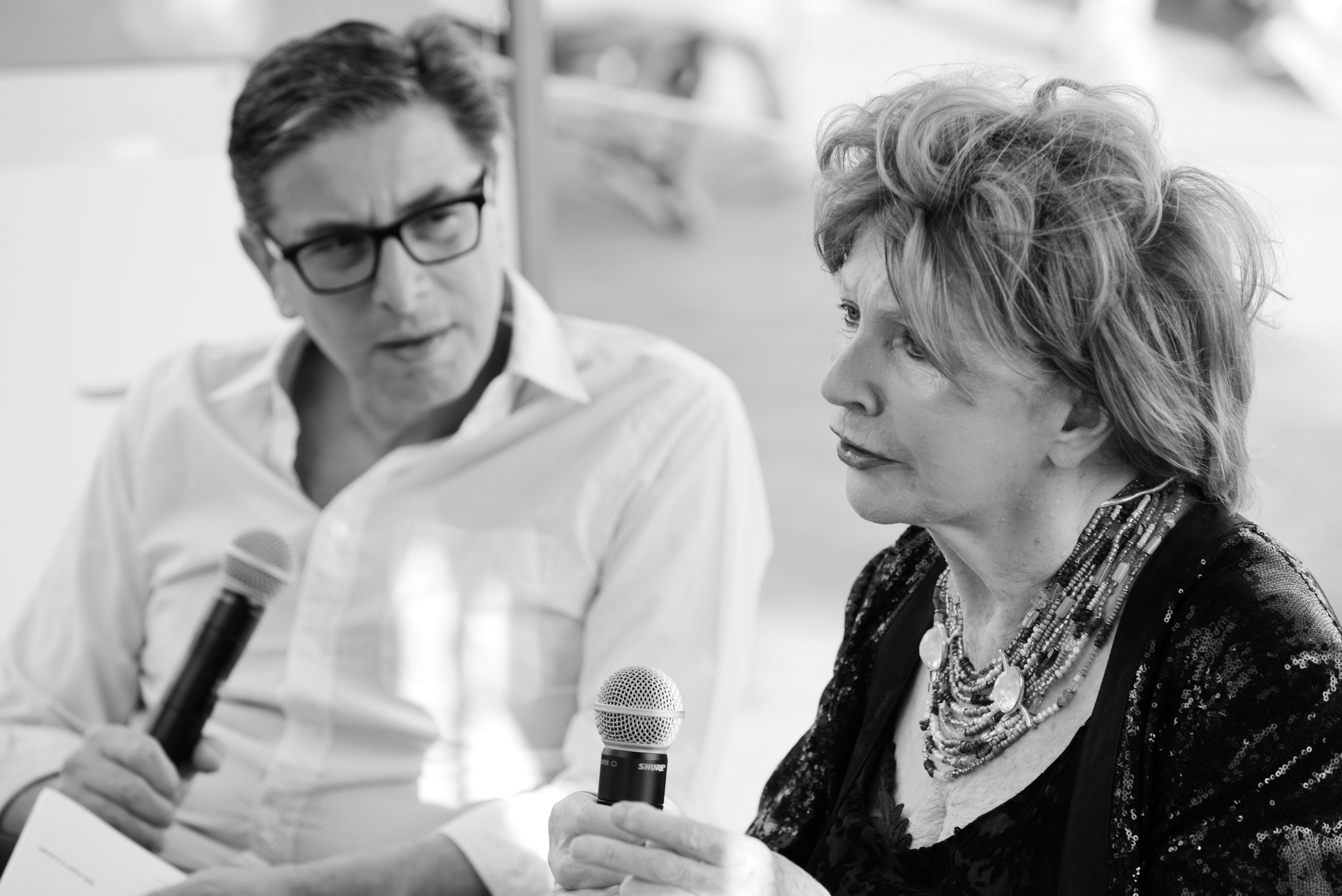
The author Edna O'Brien—seen here in 2015—interviewed McGlinchey in Portlaoise

In the early 1990s novelist Edna O'Brien interviewed McGlinchey several times in Portlaoise while meticulously researching her novel House of Splendid Isolation. In the novel, the protagonist is an on-the-run republican terrorist named Roger McGreevy. Believing he has found an empty house to hole up in, he discovers an elderly woman in residence. The narrative explores the evolving relationship between the two, which moves from fear and distrust on her part to "a sort of mutual liking, even tenderness", writes the critic John Dunne, although noting that McGreevy "is no Mad Dog". The scholar Richard Bradford argues that the novel indicates a degree of "macabre" hero worship on behalf of O'Brien towards McGlinchey, upon whom scholars accept she generally based the character and who she treats with concomitant sympathy: McGreevy describes himself as seeking "Justice. Personal identity. Truth". Similarities between McGreevy and McGlinchey include their wives having been killed previously, both being interned at a young age and both spending their lives on the run. O'Brien, comments the researcher John Maher, "builds up, through the old woman's interactions with McGreevy, an increasingly sympathetic picture of the terrorist [which] reflects O 'Brien's own strong republican sympathies". O'Brien's interviews with McGlinchey were themselves notorious, and demonstrated her willingness to court controversy. (Note: The Belfast Telegraph columnist Jane Hardy, to whom O'Brien talked in 2010, wrote that "Edna, who conducted a notorious interview with former INLA leader Dominic McGlinchey in the early 1990s as background to her novel, House of Splendid Isolation, still likes to be controversial. Like many, she feels that Ireland should be one country, but unlike the majority, she also thinks that there is some justification for the Republican armed struggle." The critic Fintan O'Toole explains O'Brien's interviews with McGlinchey as a product of her desire "to avoid the trap of merely recycling the perceptions of the 1950s and 1960s" This, he says "has led her into an unusually direct approach to research".) O'Brien herself denied that the character was McGlinchey. She countered that, while "he certainly played a strong part in the people that talked to me", McGreevy was a composite of many different men.

The central character of Martin McDonagh's 2001 black comedy—and "satire on sectarian violence"—The Lieutenant of Inishmore, Padraic, was based on the public image of McGlinchey, according to Morrison. Set against the backdrop of the early days of the Peace Process, "Mad Patrick" is stated to be a member of the INLA in 1993 Ireland. Padraic's activities involve pulling out the toenails of drug dealers, assassination and torture. Morrison, though, argues that "some of McDonagh's information was derived from a highly inaccurate image of McGlinchey provided by sensationalist British and Irish newspaper reports at the time of the prolific murderer's heyday", and argues that, unknowingly, McDonagh has reiterated this image. The author Henry McDonald, writing in The Guardian, agrees that Padraic "bears some comparison with the real life" of McGlinchey, as both are portrayed as being "too extreme even for the Provisional IRA".

A 2007 Irish film reinterpretion of Macbeth—retitled Mickey B. and filmed in Maghaberry Prison—was set against the backdrop of prison drug dealing. The murder of Macduff's family in act IV scene ii, comments the director Tom Magill, "draws heavily" on the 1987 murder of Mary McGlinchey while bathing her children. Magill later explained

Audiences abroad often miss the parallels in the film—e.g. the assassination of Macduff 's family draws heavily upon the assassination of the wife of Irish National Liberation Army leader Dominic McGlinchey, Mary McGlinchey, bathing her two children at home.

The central figure in Shane MacGown's 1997 song "Paddy Public Enemy No. 1" is based on McGlinchey; when asked his opinion of him, MacGowan said "he was a great man". The Irish Brigade's ballad, "Hands Up, Trousers Down" referenced McGlinchey's treatment of the Gardaí while on the run.

== See also ==
- Timeline of Irish National Liberation Army actions
