= Seamus Grew =

Irish National Liberation Army volunteer

Seamus Grew c.1973

Seamus Grew (July 1951 – 12 December 1982) was a volunteer in the Irish National Liberation Army (INLA) who, along with Roddy Carroll, was killed in controversial circumstances by police officers from the Special Support Unit E4A of the Royal Ulster Constabulary. It is alleged that this was part of an attempt to kill the INLA Chief of Staff Dominic McGlinchey, although it is highly likely both men were the intended targets. Their deaths were subsequently investigated by John Stalker as part of his investigation into an apparent State shoot-to-kill policy in Northern Ireland.

In 1984 the first appointed Coroner Gerry Curran resigned due to "grave irregularities" in the case.

Grew was born into a Catholic family in Armagh, known for its involvement with Civil Rights and Irish republicanism. He was married, with a family, and resided in the nationalist Mullacreevie Park area of the city. It is alleged that when he was killed, he was a Commander within his organisation, and was in charge of military operations for the Irish National Liberation Army in Northern Ireland.

His brother Desmond was killed by the Special Air Service in 1990. At various times they have had associations with the Civil Rights Movement, the People's Democracy, Official IRA, Provisional IRA, Irish National Liberation Army, and the Irish Republican Socialist Party.
