= Shoot-to-kill policy in Northern Ireland =

Alleged policy by British security forces during the Troubles

During the Troubles in Northern Ireland, British security forces were accused by some of operating a "shoot-to-kill" policy, under which suspected paramilitary members were killed without an attempt being made to arrest them. This alleged policy was claimed to be most frequently directed against suspected members of Irish republican paramilitary organisations, such as the Provisional Irish Republican Army (IRA), Official Irish Republican Army (OIRA) and Irish National Liberation Army (INLA). According to a 1985 inquiry by a team of international lawyers titled Shoot to Kill?, undercover security force units were "trained to shoot to kill even where killing is not legally justifiable and where alternative tactics could and should be used." The British government, including the Northern Ireland Office, consistently denied that there was ever a "shoot-to-kill" policy, stating that "like everyone else, the security forces must obey the law and are answerable to the courts for their actions."

Notable incidents where a "shoot-to-kill" policy was alleged to have been used include the Loughgall ambush, ambush at Drumnakilly, Coagh ambush, Clonoe ambush and Operation Flavius. These incidents were all operations carried out by the security forces against the IRA and INLA, and resulted in 21 Irish republican paramilitaries being killed. Other notable incidents involving civilian deaths include the 7 August 1974 killing of an unarmed Catholic farmer (Patrick McElhone, aged 24) who was taken from his home outside of Pomeroy, County Tyrone and shot dead by a British Army patrol, found years later by a coroner to be "unjustified"; the death of Fergal Caraher, who was fatally shot by a Royal Marine at a checkpoint; and the killings of Karen Reilly and Martin Peake, who allegedly drove through a British Army checkpoint at high speed, with one soldier, Lee Clegg, subsequently being tried for the shootings. The killing of Ulster Volunteer Force (UVF) member Brian Robinson by undercover British soldiers is notable for being the most prominent of the very few alleged "shoot-to-kill" incidents where the victim was an Ulster loyalist.

== Stalker/Sampson Inquiry ==
On 24 May 1984, Deputy Chief Constable John Stalker of the Greater Manchester Police opened an inquiry into allegations that a specially trained undercover RUC team known as the "Headquarters Mobile Support Unit" had carried out a "shoot-to-kill" policy in three distinct cases:

- 11 November 1982: The killing of three unarmed IRA members, Eugene Toman, Sean Burns and Gervaise McKerr, at an RUC checkpoint in east Lurgan, County Armagh. Three officers were acquitted of their murder in June 1984, the presiding judge, Lord Justice Maurice Gibson, commending them for their "courage and determination in bringing the three deceased men to justice – in this case, to the final court of justice."
- 24 November 1982: The killing, by an RUC undercover unit, of Michael Tighe and the wounding of his friend Martin McCauley at an IRA arms cache on a farm near Lurgan, County Armagh. (19 years later, McCauley was arrested in Colombia, accused by the Colombian authorities of teaching FARC guerillas in the use of explosives, in particular the "barrack buster").
- 12 December 1982: The killing at an RUC checkpoint in Mullacreavie, County Armagh, of two INLA members, Seamus Grew and Roddy Carroll. (The intended main target, Dominic McGlinchey, was not in their car as expected.)

The shootings were initially investigated by other members of the RUC, and the Director of Public Prosecutions for Northern Ireland decided to bring prosecutions. At the first trial, relating to the shootings of the two INLA men, Constable John Robinson admitted to having been instructed to lie in his statements, and that other witnesses had similarly altered their stories to provide justification for opening fire on Grew and Carroll. When Robinson was found not guilty, the resulting public outcry caused RUC Chief Constable John Hermon to ask John Stalker to investigate the killings.

On 5 June 1986, just before Stalker was to make his final report, he was removed from his position in charge of the inquiry. On 30 June, he was suspended from duty over allegations of association with criminals. On 22 August, he was cleared of the allegations and returned to duty, although he was not reinstated as head of the inquiry. The inquiry was taken over by Colin Sampson of the West Yorkshire Police. Its findings were never made public.

In the book Stalker, published by Stalker in 1988, the following descriptions of his investigation into the three shooting incidents appeared, concerning the McKerr, Toman and Burns shooting:

The Stalker inquiry discovered that the three victims of the shooting had been under surveillance for many hours by the police who planned to intercept them at a place different from where the killings occurred. No serious attempt to attract the attention of the driver was made, and no policeman was struck by the car. Immediately after the incident the police officers drove from the scene with their weapons and returned to their base for a debriefing by senior Special Branch Officers. Officers from the Criminal Investigation Department (CID) were denied access for many days to the police officers involved and to their car, clothes and weapons for forensic examination. On the night of the killings, CID officers were given incorrect information about where the shootings began and part of the forensic examination was conducted in the wrong place. Many cartridge cases of rounds fired were never found.

We believed... that at least one officer had been in an entirely different position from that which he had claimed to be in when some fatal shots were fired. I also established that the police pursuit took place in a different manner from that described. But most damning of all, almost 21 months after the shooting we found fragments of the bullet that undoubtedly killed the driver still embedded in the car. That crucial evidence had lain undiscovered by the RUC and Forensic Science service... My conclusion in relation to the missing cartridge cases was that as many as twenty were deliberately removed from the scene. I could only presume that this was in order to mislead the forensic scientists and to hide the true nature and extent of the shooting.

I had to regard the investigation of the matter as slipshod and in some aspects woefully inadequate. I was left with two alternative conclusions, either that some RUC detectives were amateur and inefficient at even the most basic of murder investigation routines; or that they had been deliberately inept.

Concerning the three incidents as a whole, Stalker wrote:

Even though six deaths had occurred over a five-week period... and involved in each case officers from the same specialist squad, no co-ordinated investigation had ever been attempted. It seemed that the investigating officers had never spoken to each other. Worse still, despite the obvious political and public implications, no senior officer had seen fit to draw the reports together. We had expected a particularly high level of enquiry in view of the nature of the deaths, but this was shamefully absent. The files were little more than a collection of statements, apparently prepared for a coroner's enquiry. They bore no resemblance to my idea of a murder prosecution file. Even on the most cursory of readings I could see clearly why the prosecutions had failed.

According to The Times of 9 February 1988, Stalker stated that although he never found written evidence of a shoot-to-kill policy, there was a "clear understanding" that officers were expected to enforce it.

In 1990 the RUC issued a response to Stalker's book, saying that the book contained many inaccuracies and distortions and gave a misleading impression. In particular it stated, in contradiction to Stalker's assertions, that:

- it was wrong to allege that the three investigations were carried out under different detectives as the same detective superintendent was in charge of two of the investigations
- the investigation files were presented to the Director of Public Prosecutions in the format approved by him
- it was already established in a police statement of 13 November 1982 that no police officer had been struck by the car driven by Gervaise McKerr
- it had been advisable, for the safety of the three officers, that they leave the scene immediately
- their weapons had been seized without delay by the scene of crimes officers
- no incorrect information was given to the investigating officers concerning where the shooting occurred, although uniformed officers had mistakenly positioned the tape on the junction and it was repositioned accurately shortly afterwards
- although it was accepted that all the cartridges were not recovered, due to the torrential rain at the time some could have been washed down the drains; the area had nonetheless been swept over for two days with metal detectors.

Criticisms were also made that Stalker had gone outside his remit to reinvestigate the shooting incidents as well as a terrorist incident on 27 October 1982 in which three police officers had been killed and that his report, when submitted, lacked the clarity and precision normally associated with criminal investigations.

The government also submitted that, on 23 June 1992, John Thorburn (the number two on Stalker's inquiry team), when withdrawing a libel action against the RUC Chief Constable, had made a statement in which he took the opportunity to submit publicly that he was satisfied that the RUC had not pursued a shoot-to-kill policy in 1982 and that the RUC Chief Constable had not condoned or authorised any deliberate or reckless killings by his officers. Other members of the Stalker/Sampson inquiry team also stated in June 1990 that "the Greater Manchester officers wish to stress that the Stalker/Sampson Enquiry found no evidence of a 'Shoot to Kill policy'".

== Court rulings ==
Some of the victims' families were awarded reimbursement of legal expenses from the Ministry of Defence following cases brought to the European Court of Human Rights against the British government. The European judges considered four cases between 1982 and 1992 in which 14 people were killed. They involved the deaths of 12 IRA members and two civilians (one a Sinn Féin member) by the SAS, the RUC and the loyalist Ulster Defence Association, allegedly acting in collusion with the RUC.

In the judgement, the court ruled that eight armed IRA men shot dead by soldiers of an SAS unit at Loughgall, County Armagh, in 1987, and two IRA men killed by RUC officers, had their human rights violated. It said this had arisen because of the failure of the state authorities to conduct a proper investigation into the circumstances of the deaths, though the court did not rule that the use of lethal force itself was unlawful. A similar finding was brought in the case of Sinn Féin member Patrick Shanaghan, who was killed by loyalist paramilitaries. The findings were brought under Article 2 of the European Convention on Human Rights.

== Cultural impact ==
A number of television programmes were produced about or in reaction to specific incidents in particular or the shoot-to-kill issue in general:

- "Death on the Rock" – an edition of This Week about the Gibraltar killings, produced by Thames Television for ITV, shown on 28 April 1988.
- Nineteen 96 – a BBC1 Screen One drama, broadcast on BBC1 on 17 September 1989 which, in relocating the Stalker inquiry to Wales in 1996 and combining it with some elements of the Kincora boys' home scandal, treated it as fiction set in the future. Keith Barron was cast as the investigating officer. The drama was written by G. F. Newman and directed by Karl Francis
- Shoot to Kill – a four-hour drama documentary about the Stalker inquiry, with Jack Shepherd in the lead role, David Calder as John Thorburn, and T. P. McKenna as Sir John Hermon. It had originally been intended to be a straightforward documentary, but in the words of the director, "all of the people we would have wanted to interview were either dead – in that they were shot by the RUC in 1982 – they had disappeared and were given new identities, or they were still serving policemen and weren't available for interview." The drama featured re-enactments of all three incidents investigated by Stalker – including information that Dominic McGlinchey had been the intended target in the third – and the course of Stalker's investigation. Written by Michael Eaton and directed by Peter Kosminsky, and produced by Yorkshire Television for ITV, it was shown in two parts on 3 and 4 June 1990, with the second episode being followed by a half-hour studio discussion between Kosminsky, Conservative Member of Parliament Ian Gow (assassinated by the Provisional IRA two months later), Social Democratic and Labour Party MP Seamus Mallon, Ulster Unionist Party MP David Trimble, and Larry Cox of Amnesty International.
- Hidden Agenda – a 1990 film directed by Ken Loach which based a fictionalised version of the Stalker inquiry in the context of the shooting of an American civil rights lawyer.
- "Lethal Force" – an edition of Panorama investigating a number of cases, including the killing by undercover members of 14 Intelligence Company of John McNeill, Eddie Hale and Peter Thompson, as they attempted to rob a Belfast betting shop armed with replica firearms on 13 January 1990, and the killing by soldiers of 3 Para of joyriders Martin Peake and Karen Reilly on 30 September the same year. It was shown on BBC1 on 22 July 1991.
- You, Me and Marley – a BBC2 Screenplay drama, written by Graham Reid and directed by Richard Spence, inspired by the killing of Peake and Reilly, and shown on 30 September 1992 (the first anniversary of their deaths).
- Shifty – a series of documentary films by Adam Curtis on changing power in the United Kingdom included a segment on the Shoot-to-Kill policy in relation to anti-Masonry conspiracy theories.
