= Thomas G. Mitchell =

Thomas Greenfield Mitchell
- Occupations: Medical mycologist, clinical microbiologist, and academic

Academic background
- Education: B.A. Ph.D.
- Alma mater: University of North Texas; Tulane University

Academic work
- Institutions: Duke University

Thomas Greenfield Mitchell is an American medical mycologist, clinical microbiologist, and academic. He is an Associate Professor Emeritus in Molecular Genetics and Microbiology at Duke University.

Mitchell's research uses DNA-based methods to identify fungal pathogens, resolve taxonomic issues, and study the population genetics and virulence factors of Candida albicans and Cryptococcus neoformans. His work is focused on correlating genotypes with clinically relevant phenotypes, including drug resistance, in immunocompromised patients, with publications in journals such as the Journal of Clinical Microbiology, Analytical Chemistry, and Molecular Ecology. His work has been cited in notable studies, including one conducted by researchers from the Tri-Institutional Molecular Mycology and Pathogenesis Training Program.

Mitchell is a Fellow of the Infectious Diseases Society of America, the American Academy of Microbiology, and the American Association for the Advancement of Science.

== Education and early career ==
Mitchell earned his B.A. in Biology, with minors in Chemistry and German, from North Texas University in 1963. He worked as a Research Technician at Tulane University from 1964 to 1966, and completed his Ph.D. at Tulane in 1971.

== Career ==
Mitchell joined Duke University School of Medicine as an Assistant Professor, a role he held until 1979. During his tenure there, he served as Director of three laboratories within Duke Hospital—the Serology Laboratory, the Clinical Mycology Laboratory—and as a professor at Duke University Medical Center from 1980 to 2011, and has held the title of Associate Professor Emeritus since 2011.

Mitchell has served as a Principal Investigator and Research Consultant, receiving NIH awards for his work on fungal diseases, including studies on C. neoformans in AIDS and the development of microfluidic PCR platforms for microbial DNA detection. He also held administrative roles at Duke University School of Medicine, directing the Duke Summer Mycology Course from 1975 to 1992 and the Microbiology and Infectious Diseases Study Program from 1992 to 2007. Between 2003 and 2012, he established and led the Molecular Mycology and Pathogenesis Training Program, a tri-institutional postdoctoral initiative involving faculty from Duke University, the University of North Carolina at Chapel Hill, and North Carolina State University.

== Research ==
Mitchell's research, in collaboration with other scholars, has explored the molecular genetics and pathogenicity of fungal species such as Cryptococcus and Candida, with a focus on their role in clinical microbiology and population genetics. In 1993, he employed polymerase chain reaction (PCR)-based fingerprinting to differentiate and characterize strains of Cryptococcus neoformans. His work advanced the understanding of C. neoformans and its impact on AIDS patients, emphasizing the role of CD4+ and CD8+ T cells in immunity. He further investigated 34 C. neoformans strains globally, revealing significant genetic divergence, recent dispersion, hybridization, and the absence of a clear phylogeographic pattern. His contributions also extended to sequencing the C.neoformans genome, uncovering gene structures, transposons, and unique virulence factors. In 2009, his research highlighted the role of unisexual mating in shaping C.neoformans; genetic diversity, with broader implications for the evolution of microbial pathogens through mechanisms like selfing and inbreeding. Additionally, in collaborative work, he presented a consensus multi-locus sequence typing scheme, utilizing seven unlinked genetic loci (CAP59, GPD1, LAC1, PLB1, SOD1, URA5, and IGS1) for global strain genotyping of C.neoformans and Cryptococcus gattii. Moreover, between 2007 and 2012, he collected and analyzed variant specimens of cryptococcus from India, Botswana, South Africa.

Mitchell identified clinical Candida albicans strains using DNA fingerprinting with PCR, demonstrating its efficiency in differentiating isolates and its potential for epidemiological studies. A comparison of 78 C. albicans strains, including samples from HIV-infected patients and healthy volunteers, revealed that fluconazole resistance originated from both clonal sources in HIV patients and spontaneous mutations in individuals without prior fluconazole exposure. Furthermore, he documented six nuclear genes from 38 strains, uncovering three major clades and independent evolutionary paths for key traits in medically important Candida species and related taxa. Later, he evaluated a digital microfluidic real-time PCR platform for detecting C. albicans DNA in blood, demonstrating its 94% sensitivity in clinical specimens and offering a rapid, automated diagnostic alternative to traditional methods.

== Awards and honors ==
- 1991 – Fellow, Infectious Diseases Society of America
- 1994 – Fellow, American Academy of Microbiology
- 2008 – Fellow, American Association for the Advancement of Science
- 2004 – Billy H. Cooper Award, Medical Mycological Society of the Americas

== Selected articles ==
- Meyer, W., Mitchell, T. G., Freedman, E. Z., & Vilgalys, R. (1993). Hybridization probes for conventional DNA fingerprinting used as single primers in the polymerase chain reaction to distinguish strains of Cryptococcus neoformans. Journal of Clinical Microbiology, 31(9), 2274–2280.
- Mitchell, T. G., & Perfect, J. R. (1995). Cryptococcosis in the era of AIDS—100 years after the discovery of Cryptococcus neoformans. Clinical microbiology reviews, 8(4), 515–548.
- Xu, J., Luo, G., Vigalys, R., Brandt, M.E., & Mitchell, T.G. (2002). Multiple origins of hybrid strains of Cryptococcus neoformans with serotype AD. Microbiology.148(Pt 1):203-212. doi: 10.1099/00221287-148-1-203
- Luo, G., & Mitchell, T. G. (2002). Rapid identification of pathogenic fungi directly from cultures by using multiplex PCR. Journal of Clinical Microbiology, 40(8), 2860–2865.
- Loftus, B. J., Fung, E., Roncaglia, P., Rowley, D., Amedeo, P., Bruno, D., ... & Hyman, R. W. (2005). The genome of the basidiomycetous yeast and human pathogen Cryptococcus neoformans. Science, 307(5713), 1321–1324.
- Litvintseva, A. P., Thakur, R., Vilgalys, R., & Mitchell, T. G. (2006). Multilocus sequence typing reveals three genetic subpopulations of Cryptococcus neoformans var. grubii (serotype A), including a unique population in Botswana. Genetics, 172(4), 2223–2238.
- Meyer, W., Aanensen, D. M., Boekhout, T., Cogliati, M., Diaz, M. R., Esposto, M. C., ... & Kwon-Chung, J. (2009). Consensus multi-locus sequence typing scheme for Cryptococcus neoformans and Cryptococcus gattii. Medical mycology, 47(6), 561–570.
