= Headquarters Mobile Support Unit =

Police tactical unit in Northern Ireland

- Active: 1980 – present
- Country: Northern Ireland; United Kingdom
- Agency: Police Service of Northern Ireland
- Type: Police tactical unit
- Role: Counter-terrorism; Law enforcement
- Operations jurisdiction: Northern Ireland
- Part of: Specialist Operations Branch (C4)
- Abbreviation: HMSU

The Headquarters Mobile Support Unit (HMSU) is the police tactical unit of the Police Service of Northern Ireland (PSNI). The HMSU was originally formed in the then Special Branch part of the Royal Ulster Constabulary (RUC) and was involved in several controversial shootings during The Troubles.

== Background ==
The Headquarters Mobile Support Unit (HMSU) was a uniformed elite police tactical unit established by the RUC, intended to be their equivalent of the British Army Special Air Service (SAS). Members of the HMSU were enrolled into RUC Special Branch and were trained by the SAS to on how to confront Irish Republican Army (IRA) members and other opponents with "firepower, speed and aggression".

The unit had its prototype in the Bessbrook Support Unit set up in 1977 as part of the scaling-up of the RUC's numbers and capabilities under Chief Constable Kenneth Newman to "Ulsterise" as far as possible the maintenance of security. The intensively trained and highly armed Bessbrook Support Unit were intended to take over from the SAS the role of deployment along the South Armagh border to intercept IRA active service units. The Bessbrook Support Unit were in 1979 replaced with a Special Patrol Group (SPG), which was in turn replaced in 1981 by the Special Support Unit (SSU). The SSU was subsequently renamed the Headquarters Mobile Support Unit (HMSU) after two of its members were convicted of kidnap and murder. The two, John Weir and Billy McCaughey, implicated some of their colleagues in a range of crimes including giving weapons, information and transport to loyalist paramilitaries as well as carrying out shooting and bombing attacks of their own. Weir alleged that senior officers, including Chief Superintendent Harry Breen, were aware of and approved of their activity. Additionally, it was felt the initials "SSU" were considered too similar to "SAS", suggesting a military-style unit.

=== "Shoot to kill" ===
The SSU was involved in the alleged "shoot-to-kill" incidents of November and December 1982, when six Republican paramilitaries were shot dead in three separate incidents, all of whom turned out to be unarmed. These incidents, and evidence that came out in court of organised falsification of the details of the encounters, led to the setting up of the 1984–86 Stalker Inquiry.

During this period, according to evidence given in court at the time by RUC deputy chief constable Michael McAtamney, officers selected for the unit underwent an immensely tough two-week assessment of fitness, mental ability and endurance under pressure, followed by a four-week course, including seven days devoted exclusively to weapons training, with the focus being to "eliminate the threat" posed to officers.

In addition to standard weaponry, the unit additionally used Ingram sub-machine guns; Remington pump-action shotguns and Browning semi-automatic shotguns; the Ruger Mini-14 light semi-automatic rifle; and 14-shot Smith & Wesson Model 59 9mm pistols carried as personal sidearms. According to one subsequent report, at the time of the 1982 shootings, the HMSU that had been active in the constabulary's southern region comprised two dozen men, working in field teams of six, travelling in pairs of specially armoured unmarked Ford Cortinas, the front passenger with a Sterling submachine gun, the rear passenger a Ruger rifle, and all three, including the driver, armed with pistols.

The unit was based at Lisnasharrah, East Belfast, and worked closely with the plain-clothes intelligence gathering unit E4A. Many were English and/or ex-soldiers. According to reports, as uncovered by the Stalker Inquiry, the units operated almost as a law unto themselves, taking orders only from a small group at Gough Barracks in Armagh that was in charge of tasking and co-ordination, who in turn answered only to Special Branch at constabulary headquarters at Knock. Members generally refused to recognise the authority of senior officers not in the unit, a constable on one occasion telling a CID detective to leave the site and come back after he had had a meal.

According to American writer J. Bowyer Bell, there were two such units in all at the time, of 24 members each, although a 1985 newspaper article claimed at least 12 such squads were active. The same article explained their rationale: "The circumstances of the shootings have to be put into the context of Northern Ireland. In the same period two constabulary officers who approached a car parked outside a County Down post office were shot dead by IRA men about to stage a robbery. Unionists were not slow to claim that if anyone was shooting to kill, it was the Republican paramilitaries."

=== Post-1982 ===
Following the 1982 shootings, the HMSU was reined in. Subsequently, the Royal Ulster Constabulary played only a supporting role in such operations, but the active role in intelligence-led covert ambushes was returned to the British Army, in particular the SAS and similarly trained units, under ultimate police operational control.

Tasking of these operations was put into the hands of a joint committee that included the Intelligence Corps and MI5 as well as senior police officers, rather than the original exclusive tight control by a close-knit small group of RUC officers reporting to HQ-level Special Branch. Some measures were also taken to make the Special Branch less of a force within a force, with regional assistant chief constables having to be informed of Special Branch operations in their areas, and a single senior assistant chief constable position created, with oversight responsibility for both CID and Special Branch. The HMSU continued to take part in "rapid reaction" duties, including raids on suspected paramilitary properties, and spearheading riot control.

The HMSU continued existing throughout the 1980s and 1990s as an operational sub-department of Special Branch department E4.

== Police Service of Northern Ireland ==
On 4 November 2001, the RUC was reformed and renamed the PSNI following recommendations of the 1999 Independent Commission on Policing for Northern Ireland report implementing the terms of the 1998 Good Friday Agreement.

On 29 April 2003, HMSU officers fatally shot Neil McConville during a vehicle intercept near Glenavy, County Antrim, the first fatal shooting carried out by the PSNI. At an inquest in April 2022, the coroner found that the officer who fired was justified in using lethal force, holding that he had an honest belief that force was necessary and that the force used was no more than absolutely necessary. The coroner also found that the operation had not been planned and controlled in a way that minimised the need to resort to lethal force. In March 2024, the High Court dismissed a challenge by McConville’s family and ruled that the coroner’s findings complied with Article 2 of the European Convention on Human Rights.

In March 2004, the command of the HMSU changed to the newly formed Crime Operations Department with the HMSU becoming part of C4 Specialist Operations Branch separating from Special Branch, which was renamed the Intelligence Branch.

In November 2014, HMSU officers were photographed following an operation at a house in Newry to arrest members of the Continuity IRA.

HMSU officers undergo a 26-week training programme including firearms, unarmed combat, roping, driving, close personal protection and photography. HMSU officers are trained to Specialist Firearms Officer and Counter Terrorist Specialist Firearms Officer standards.
