= E4A =

The E4A was an intelligence-gathering unit within 'E' Department of the Royal Ulster Constabulary, probably established in 1978. It was primarily made up of police officers who conducted surveillance to be acted on by RUC Special Branch (E4C). E4A was supported by the Headquarters Mobile Support Unit (now part of Special Operations Branch) and targeted paramilitary groups, primarily the Provisional IRA.
