= Provisional IRA Belfast Brigade =

Paramilitary unit

Belfast Brigade
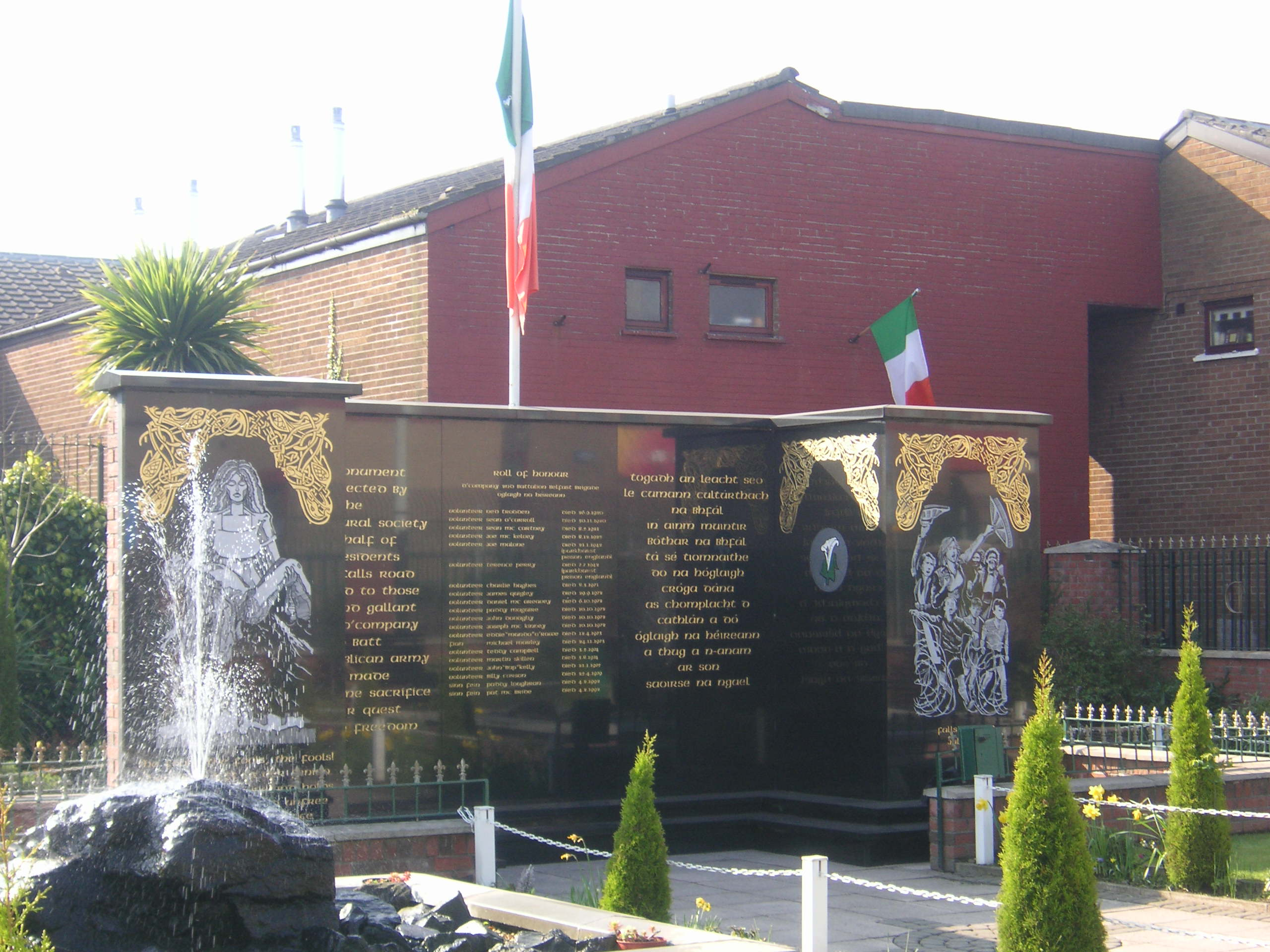
- Provisional IRA memorial in Belfast
- Active: December 1969–July 1997
- Disbanded: July 2005; 21 years ago
- Allegiance: Provisional Irish Republican Army
- Size: 1,200 (December 1971)
- Area of operations: Greater Belfast
- Conflict: The Troubles: Battle of St Matthew's; 1971 Scottish soldiers' killings; 1971 Springfield Road RUC Barracks bombing; Red Lion Pub bombing; Balmoral Furniture bombing; Abercorn Restaurant bombing; Battle at Springmartin; Battle of Lenadoon; Bloody Friday; Donegall Street bombing; 1973 Old Bailey Bombing; Honey Trap killings; Mountainview Tavern attack (claimed by Republican Action Force); Bayardo Bar attack; Stag Inn attack (claimed by Republican Action Force); La Mon restaurant bombing; Antrim Road stand off; Maze Prison escape; Corporals killings; 1988 Lisburn van bombing; Crumlin Road Prison bombing; Night of the Long Knives (1992); Shankill Road bombing; Thiepval barracks bombing; July 1997 clashes

Commanders
- Notable commanders: Billy McKee; Joe Cahill; Seamus Twomey; Ivor Bell; Brendan Hughes; Martin Meehan; Brian Gillen; Gerard "Jock" Davison; Eddie Copeland (3rd Battalion Commander)

The Belfast Brigade of the Provisional IRA was the largest of the organisation's brigades, based in the city of Belfast, Northern Ireland.

The nucleus of the Belfast Brigade emerged in the divisions within Belfast republicans in the closing months of 1969, and was formally established in January 1970 as the structures of the new dissident group were created after splitting from the Official IRA.

The brigade was organised along geographical lines into three battalions:

- The first battalion covered the Upper Falls, Ballymurphy and Andersonstown
- The second battalion covered the Lower Falls, Clonard and the Divis Flats
- And the third battalion covered The Bone and the Short Strand.

== Formation ==
The Belfast Brigade was one of the first active units of the Provisional IRA, after the split in the IRA in late 1969. In the aftermath of the 1969 Northern Ireland riots, many republicans in Belfast felt that the IRA had let down the city's Catholic and nationalist community by failing to prevent the assault and burning of Catholic streets by loyalists. Billy McKee denounced Billy McMillen, the IRA's Belfast commander, and the Dublin-based IRA leadership, for having failed to provide arms, planning or manpower to defend Catholic streets.

On 22 September, McKee and a number of other armed, IRA men, arrived at a meeting called by McMillen and tried to oust him as head of the Belfast IRA. They did not succeed, but announced that they would no longer be taking orders from the IRA leadership in Dublin. In December of that year, the IRA split into the Provisional IRA, which was composed of traditional militarists like McKee—and the Official IRA, which was composed of the pre-split Marxist leadership and their followers. McKee sided with the Provisionals and sat on the first Provisional Army Council in September 1970. Nine out of thirteen IRA units in Belfast sided with the Provisionals in 1969, roughly 120 activists and 500 supporters.

== History ==
=== The start of the armed campaign ===
McKee became the first Officer Commanding (OC) of the Provisional IRA Belfast Brigade. From the start, there was intermittent feuding between McKee's men and his former comrades in the Official IRA, as they vied for control of nationalist areas. The Provisionals, however, rapidly gained the upper hand, due to their projection of themselves as the most reliable defenders of the Catholic community.

McKee himself contributed greatly to this image by an action he undertook on 27 June 1970. Rioting broke out in the Ardoyne area of north Belfast after an Orange Order parade, and three Protestants were killed in gun battles between the Provisional IRA and loyalists. In response, loyalists prepared to attack the vulnerable Catholic enclave of Short Strand in east Belfast. When McKee heard about this, he drove to Short Strand with some men and weapons and took up position at St Matthew's Church. In the ensuing five-hour gun battle, McKee was wounded and one of his men was killed, along with at least four Protestants.

The leadership of the Provisional IRA had always planned to broaden their activities from defensive operations to an offensive campaign aimed at removing British rule from Northern Ireland. This only became practicable, however, after the Catholic community's relationship with the British Army deteriorated rapidly over the course of 1970. This deterioration was due to the British Army's heavy-handed treatment of Catholics and nationalists in their efforts to combat republican paramilitaries. For example, on 5–7 July 1970, up to 3,000 troops sealed off the lower Falls area and conducted an aggressive search for arms - an episode known as the Falls Curfew. Five civilians were killed and over 60 injured in gun battles between the troops and the Official IRA (who at that time were the dominant IRA faction in that part of Belfast). Over 300 people were arrested and the area was flooded with CS gas.

After this point, the Belfast Brigade's strategy shifted from 'defence' to 'retaliation' and in January 1971, they began seeking out and attacking British Army and Royal Ulster Constabulary (RUC) patrols. On 5 February 1971, the Belfast Provisionals killed their first soldier, Robert Curtis, who was killed by Billy Reid in a gun battle in the New Lodge area. In other confrontations around the city in the same night, one IRA man and two Catholic civilians were also killed in exchanges of fire with the British Army Thereafter, gun battles between the IRA in Belfast and the security forces became a regular occurrence. By July 1971, ten soldiers had died at the hands of the IRA in the city

On 15 April 1971, McKee, along with Proinsias MacAirt, was arrested by the British Army when found in possession of a hand gun. He was charged and convicted for possession of the weapon and imprisoned in Crumlin Road Gaol, and Joe Cahill took over as OC of the Belfast Brigade.

In the early years of the Troubles, the Provisional IRA in Belfast expanded rapidly. In August 1969, the Brigade had just 50 active members. By the end of 1971, it had 1,200 members, giving it a large but loosely controlled structure.

It was during this period that the IRA campaign got off the ground in the city. Joe Cahill authorised the beginning of the IRA's bombing operations as well as attacks on troops and the RUC. He based himself in a house in Andersonstown and toured the city, coordinating IRA operations.

=== Internment and the escalation of violence ===
On 9 August 1971, the Army mounted Operation Demetrius, introducing internment in an effort to arrest the IRA's leaders. The following day, Joe Cahill held a press conference in a school in Ballymurphy and stated that the operation had been a failure. He said, "we have lost one brigade officer, one battalion officer and the rest are volunteers, or as they say in the British Army, privates". Cahill himself, however, had to flee to the Republic of Ireland to avoid arrest, thus relinquishing his command of the Belfast Brigade. Seamus Twomey took over Cahill's position as OC.

In the three days that followed the introduction of internment, there was fierce rioting and gun battles in nationalist areas of Belfast, as troops sought to enter these areas to arrest paramilitary suspects. In all, 17 people were killed in the clashes, among them two Provisional IRA members and three soldiers. In the remainder of 1971, 37 soldiers and 97 civilians were killed. In 1972, the death toll increased still further. The period was also costly for the IRA. In the Belfast Brigade's Second Battalion alone, for example, twenty IRA volunteers were killed in the twelve months after August 1971.

From 26 June to 10 July 1972 the Provisional IRA leadership declared a ceasefire and held talks with the British government. This truce broke down, however, in part due to a confrontation between the IRA's Belfast Brigade and the British Army in Lenadoon in west Belfast. The local IRA insisted that Catholic families who had been forced from Protestant areas be housed in homes vacated by Protestant families who had fled the predominantly nationalist Lenadoon area. The loyalist Ulster Defence Association in turn threatened to burn the houses if they were occupied by Catholics. When the Catholic families attempted to move in, the British Army stopped them, provoking a riot with the local Catholic population. Seamus Twomey, commander of the Belfast Brigade, declared that the British had violated the truce and shortly afterwards, his men opened fire on the troops. Sean MacStiofain, the IRA chief of staff, formally announced the end of the ceasefire that night, in response to events in Belfast.

In addition to attacks on the Army, a central part of the Belfast Brigade's campaign was the bombing of commercial targets such as shops and businesses. The most devastating example of the Provisionals' commercial bombing campaign was Bloody Friday on 21 July 1972 in Belfast city centre, where 22 bombs were exploded, killing nine people and injuring 130. While most of the IRA's attacks on commercial targets were not designed to cause casualties, on many occasions they killed civilian bystanders. Other examples include the Abercorn Restaurant bombing in Belfast in 1972, where two people were killed and 130 wounded.

=== Setbacks: Operation Motorman and arrests ===
Up to 1972, the IRA in Belfast effectively controlled many nationalist areas of the city, manning permanent checkpoints and barricades. These 'no-go areas', however, were re-taken by the British Army in response to the Bloody Friday bombings of 1972, in a major operation named Operation Motorman. The British Army proceeded to build fortified posts in republican west Belfast, thus hampering the IRA's freedom of movement. After this setback, Seamus Twomey, who had authorised the Bloody Friday operation, was replaced as Belfast Brigade commander by Gerry Adams, with Ivor Bell as his second-in-command. Adams held the post for ten months, before he was arrested and interned in July 1973. The security forces managed to capture the next three commanders of the Belfast Brigade over the next year: Ivor Bell, who held the post from July 1973 to January 1974, Sean Convey, who lasted just two months before being arrested in March 1974, and Brendan Hughes, who was arrested in May 1974. These setbacks were indicative of the pressure being put on the IRA in Belfast, which was hard-hit by arrests in this period.

After 1972, the numbers of soldiers killed by the IRA in Belfast fell consistently. In 1972, the Provisional IRA killed 145 members of the security forces, most of them in Belfast. By 1974, this figure had fallen to 40. Moreover, the Belfast Brigade changed its tactics in an effort to avoid the heavy losses in killed and captured they had suffered up to that point. According to journalists Patrick Bishop and Eamon Mallie's book, The Provisional IRA, "As a result of the many arrests and increased Army presence, prolonged engagements with the Army faded out and were replaced with single shot sniping." In addition, "the revulsion caused by Bloody Friday persuaded the Provisionals to gradually abandon the car bomb."

=== 1975 ceasefire ===
Partly as a result of the losses they suffered through arrests in this period, and partly as a result of secret negotiations between the IRA leadership and the British government, the Provisional IRA called a ceasefire from January 1975 to January 1976. The Belfast Brigade in general welcomed this respite. Under the terms of the ceasefire it ceased offensive operations against the security forces. In return, the British government funded 'incident centres', or offices for Sinn Féin in nationalist parts of Belfast, hoping to encourage the development of the Provisional republican movement's political wing over its military wing. In practice, however, the ceasefire brought little diminution of the violence in Belfast.

The loyalist paramilitary groups, fearing a secret deal between the IRA and the government, stepped up their killings of Catholic civilians, killing over 300 between 1974 and 1976. Billy McKee, by that time commander of the Belfast Brigade, responded with retaliatory attacks on Protestant civilians. The IRA carried out 91 sectarian assassinations in 1974–1976, many of them in Belfast. One of the most notorious of these attacks came on 13 August 1975, when an IRA team led by Brendan McFarlane machine-gunned Bayardo's Bar on Belfast's Protestant Shankill Road, killing five people and injuring over 50. While the attack was intended to kill Ulster Volunteer Force members who used the bar, only one of the dead had paramilitary connections.

McKee was heavily criticised by many republicans for letting the Belfast IRA slip into a sectarian murder campaign. His critics were even angrier with his orders, in mid-1975, to attack the remaining Official IRA units in Belfast, in an effort to wipe out that organisation. The ensuing feud led to the deaths of 11 republican paramilitaries and a number of nationalist civilians; such as the head of the Falls Road taxi association, whose business was affiliated with the Provisionals. In addition, it was claimed by McKee's critics, notably Gerry Adams and Danny Morrison, that discipline in the Belfast Brigade all but broke down in this period, leading some IRA volunteers to slip into criminality. British Intelligence was also able to use the ceasefire period to recruit more informants within the IRA.

It was therefore almost with relief that many figures in the IRA Belfast Brigade welcomed the end of the IRA ceasefire in January 1976.

=== Re-organisation ===
Many in the IRA argued that the ceasefire period was the closest they had come to defeat so far. A grouping of young Belfast Provisionals, led by Gerry Adams and Ivor Bell, emerged from internment in 1976, determined to restructure the IRA. Firstly, they ousted Billy McKee as OC of the Belfast Brigade, accusing him of demoralising and discrediting the IRA by allowing it to become involved in sectarian and intra-republican feuding.

Secondly, they overhauled the IRA's structures, greatly reducing the numbers of volunteers who engaged in attacks and organising them into closed cells, or "active service units", so that the information any one IRA man would have about the organisation would be limited to five or six people. This process reduced the numbers of active IRA personnel in Belfast greatly. At its peak in the early 1970s, the Brigade had had up to 1,500 members. By the early 1980s, this had been reduced to about 100 men in active service units and another 2–300 in supporting roles. The cell structure also increased the control of the Brigade's leadership over its volunteers, since all weapons were held by one "quartermaster" attached to each unit and could only be used for operations authorised by the Brigade leadership.

=== The hunger-strike period ===
The IRA's new cell structure was somewhat compromised during the 1981 hunger strikes. During the mass protests arising out of the dispute, IRA members in Belfast were encouraged, as well as the usual sniping and assassination attacks, to lead the rioting against the RUC and British Army in nationalist areas. One effect of this was to weaken the anonymity of the IRA's "cell" organisation. According to Bishop and Mallie, "At the height of the Hunger Strike in 1981 ... the cell structure collapsed out onto the streets as the IRA, police and army engaged each other in rioting.".

=== Supergrasses ===
In the 1980s, the Belfast Brigade was hard hit by the use of supergrass informers. These were IRA men who were either recruited as informers by the RUC or who were offered immunity from prosecution in return for testifying against other IRA men. Although the supergrass system was ultimately not very successful in securing the conviction of IRA men, it led to many IRA volunteers being arrested and detained for long periods while they were awaiting trial.

The episode began with the arrest of Belfast IRA man Christopher Black in 1981. After securing assurances that he would have protection from prosecution, Black gave statements that led to 38 arrests. On 5 August 1983, 22 members of the Provisional IRA were sentenced to a total of 4,000 years in prison based on Black's testimony. (Eighteen of these convictions were overturned on appeal on 17 July 1986.) Up to 600 paramilitaries were arrested under the supergrass scheme, many of them from the Belfast Brigade.

The subsequent fear of informers within the Belfast Brigade did much to diminish the effectiveness of its units. While, during the 1970s, the Brigade had been the most active of the IRA's command areas, in the 1980s and 1990s, the IRA's rural units became relatively more important within the organisation. Informers were one aspect of this shift, other factors cited include, "the increasing sophistication of the IRA's enemies in Belfast and Derry," and the electoral strategy of Sinn Féin, which meant that, "In Belfast IRA operations had been scaled down."

In 1990, senior Sinn Féin and IRA figure Danny Morrison was arrested in a house in Belfast where an informer was being interrogated. In 2005, Denis Donaldson, a former Belfast IRA man and senior Sinn Féin worker, was "outed" as an informer. He was later killed in his holiday home in County Donegal. The most senior alleged informer in the Belfast IRA was Freddie Scappaticci, who was the head of the IRA's Internal Security Unit from 1980 to 1990.

=== 1980s and 1990s ===
In 1988, three Belfast Brigade IRA members were killed in Gibraltar by the Special Air Service (SAS) while on a bombing mission. Their funerals were attacked by loyalist gunman Michael Stone, who killed three mourners (the Milltown Cemetery attack). At the funeral of one of those killed, two plainclothes soldiers drove into the procession. They were beaten and then killed by IRA members, in an incident known as the 'corporals killings'.

In the late 1980s and early 1990s, loyalist paramilitaries stepped up their killings of Catholics. In response, the IRA in Belfast tried to assassinate loyalist leaders. It wanted to avoid retaliatory sectarian attacks against Protestant civilians like those that took place in the 1970s. In one effort to wipe out the leadership of the UDA in 1993, however, it committed one of the worst indiscriminate bombings of the IRA campaign. Two Belfast Brigade volunteers from Ardoyne planted a bomb in a fish shop in the Shankill Road where the UDA's leadership had arranged to meet. However, the bomb exploded prematurely and killed one of the bombers, Thomas Begley, one UDA member and eight Protestant civilians. In addition, 58 people were wounded. The intended targets were not in the building.

The 'tit-for-tat' cycle of killings between the IRA and loyalists continued until August 1994, when the IRA called a unilateral ceasefire. While the IRA called off its ceasefire in 1996–1997, the Belfast Brigade remained mostly quiet during this period. IRA actions were heavily restricted by the Army Council in Northern Ireland's major urban areas to avoid civilian casualties. Meanwhile, the bombing campaign in England continued. The Brigade became involved in the July 1997 clashes triggered by the Drumcree conflict.

== The post-ceasefire period ==
The ceasefire was reinstated in 1997 and has remained in force since then. While for the most part, the Belfast Brigade has not carried out armed actions, it has used its arms on a few occasions. In late 1997 and early 1998, loyalist paramilitaries carried out a spate of killings of Catholic civilians in response to the killing of Billy Wright by the Irish National Liberation Army. The IRA in Belfast in retaliation killed senior UDA member Robert Dougan on 10 February 1998.

In 2004, the Brigade was accused of carrying out the Northern Bank robbery, the largest robbery ever in Britain or Ireland. This, however, has never been proven.

In the summer of 2005, the IRA decommissioned most of its weaponry. Although few details of this process were disclosed, most of the Belfast Brigade's arms are thought to have been destroyed.

== Casualties ==
During the Troubles, the IRA Belfast Brigade lost a total of 105 of its members killed, the highest number of casualties suffered by the IRA in any one brigade area. Of these, 19 were from the First Battalion, 41 from the Second and 45 from the Third.

== See also ==
- Provisional IRA campaign 1969-1997
- Provisional IRA East Tyrone Brigade
- Provisional IRA South Armagh Brigade
- Provisional IRA Derry Brigade
- Irish National Liberation Army Belfast Brigade
