= Battle of Lenadoon =

1972 gun battles in Northern Ireland

Lenadoon Avenue Battle
- Part of The Troubles
Date	9–14 July 1972
Location	Various locations around Belfast. Heaviest fighting in Lenadoon Avenue, Ardoyne, The Falls Road & the Markets area. 54°34′30.72″N 6°0′45.70″W
Result	Indecisive: End between Provisional IRA & British Army ceasefire; Both sides take heavy losses.; Heavy civilian casualties.; Springhill Massacre; 28 people killed in total including civilian, army & paramilitary

Belligerents
(United Kingdom) British Army	Provisional IRA; Official IRA	Ulster Volunteer Force; Ulster Defence Association

Commanders and leaders
(United Kingdom) General Robert Ford; Lieutenant Colonel John Charteris; Lieutenant Robert Williams-Wynn	Brendan Hughes; Seamus Twomey	Sammy Murphy

Units involved
British Army: 14th/20th King's Hussars; Royal Anglian Regiment; Royal Regiment of Wales; Royal Fusiliers	Provisional Belfast Brigade: First Battalion; Second Battalion; Third Battalion; Official Belfast Brigade: Various sized units	UDA South Belfast Brigade; Various UVF gunmen

Strength
600+ soldiers	100+ volunteers: 100 less than 50	unknown

Casualties and losses
3 killed 30 wounded	2 killed 12 injured 3 (2 from Youth Wing) killed	At least 1 killed unknown injured
- 14 civilians killed
- Where the battle started

The Battle of Lenadoon was a series of gun battles fought over a six day period from 9–14 July 1972 between the Provisional IRA and the British Army. It started on Thursday, 9 July 1972 in and around the Lenadoon Avenue area and spread to other places in Belfast. Loyalist paramilitaries and the Official Irish Republican Army were involved in some of the incidents. 28 people in total were killed in Belfast according to the CAIN: Sutton Index of Deaths. The violence ended a two-week truce between the forces of the British Government and the IRA.

== Background ==
In 1972 The Troubles had been ongoing in Northern Ireland for three years, with Irish Republican paramilitaries increasingly attacking the Royal Ulster Constabulary and the British Army, and a level of societal violence & sectarian violence had appeared that had not been seen in the island of Ireland since the 1920s during the Irish Civil War. Shootings, bombings, ambushes, IED attacks, bank robberies and riots had become a daily theme of life in Northern Ireland, and from August 1971 gun battles between Irish Republican paramilitaries, the British Army, and Loyalist paramilitaries were a regular occurrence in Belfast, especially in its North and West districts, with their concentrations of rival populations, nicknamed the "Wild West" by RUC officers.

After "Bloody Sunday", when the British Army shot dead fourteen unarmed civil rights marchers, Irish Republican paramilitarism gained substantial support, and recruits flooded in to join the IRA, both the Provisional (PIRA) & Official (OIRA) wings. By the spring of 1972 the IRA believed they were winning and were using the slogan "Victory 72". In June 1972 the IRA's Army Council called a ceasefire to accommodate talks between an IRA delegation and the British Government. The truce lasted two weeks, with hardline IRA members eager to resume revolutionary violence, believing they had the upper hand against the British Government in the deteriorating law and order situation in Northern Ireland, and that victory was in sight.

== Battle ==
=== 9 July ===
Two days after secret talks between the British Government and IRA leadership in London broke down, the IRA in the West Belfast became involved in a sectarian confrontation in the Lenadoon Estate. A large group of Catholics attempted to move families into 16 empty council houses in Lenadoon Avenue that had been abandoned by Protestants, who had fled their homes due to the recent sectarian rioting; the Catholic families had themselves been forced to flee from other parts of the city. In an attempt to prevent a riot between the Catholics and the Protestant population that resided in the South of the Lenadoon Estate which had support from the UDA, a British Army detachment blocked the road with its armoured vehicles to halt the crowd's advance. The situation deteriorated into a riot when the Army rammed a moving truck to prevent it crossing the barricade. That evening the IRA in Belfast announced an end to its ceasefire, saying that the act was in response to events at Lenadoon Estate. IRA Army Council member Seamus Twomey, who had been negotiating with the British Army in the district up until that point, ordered Brendan Hughes, the commander of an IRA unit in the vicinity, to open fire on the British Army, and gun battles subsequently broke out.

Riots and other violence occurred in other areas in Belfast that night. In what became known as the "Springhill Massacre" British Army snipers shot dead three Catholic civilians, a Volunteer of the Official IRA and a 16-year-old member of Na Fianna Éireann (the IRA's youth wing), and injured two others civilians. Elsewhere in Belfast two Protestant civilians Brian McMillan (21) and Alan Meehan (18) along with an off-duty Catholic member of the British Army Joseph Flemming (30) were found shot dead in a semi burnt out car in Little Distillery Street just off the Grosvenor Road; it's believed Republican paramilitaries were responsible for these killings, possibly in retaliation to the events at Springhill, but no one acknowledged responsibility for the murders. A third Protestant civilian was found shot dead near the waterworks of Cavehill Road, also killed by Irish Republican paramilitary elements. In Belfast, a 60-year-old Catholic civilian was shot dead by the British Army while driving his car near the Falls Road, and the IRA shot dead an Ulster Defence Association member, Gerald Turkington, aged 32, in the Markets Area of Belfast. In total eleven people were killed on 9 July in Belfast.

Seamus Twomey confronts British Soldiers in Lenadoon Avenue before the battle began

=== 10 July ===
More gun battles and rioting took place the following day although nobody else was killed. William Whitelaw admitted secret talks had taken place between the IRA and British government.

=== 11 July ===
The IRA attempted to blow up a British Army observation post in Lenadoon Avenue, using a mechanical digger loaded with a massive bomb in its bucket. A Volunteer drove the machine into the billet and his comrades surrounded the billet and fired hundreds of shots to cover him but the bomb failed to explode properly. Between 2:30 pm – 3:00 pm a 16-year-old Volunteer from the OIRA's Youth Wing Gerard Gibson was shot dead by the British Army in Carrigart Avenue, Suffolk, Belfast near Lenadoon. Charles Watson, a 21-year-old Catholic civilian, was found shot dead off Carlisle Circus; it is believed the UDA was behind the killing.

An IRA Sniper takes cover during a gun battle

=== 14 July ===
Six hundred additional British troops were sent into Lenadoon Avenue to confront the IRA as the IRA had taken over most of the estate at this stage in the battle; this resulted in an exchange of fire which led to the deaths of a further six people. A PIRA sniper shot dead a British soldier, Robert Williams-Wynn (24), in command of an armoured car unit in Lenadoon Avenue as the unit was trying to isolate IRA volunteers in the area. A 64-year-old Protestant civilian was shot dead during a PIRA sniper attack on a British Army base in Highfield, Belfast, while Louis Scullion (27), a PIRA gunman, was shot dead by the British Army at the Unity Flats in Belfast. William Whitelaw speaking in the House of Commons said that the IRA had used an RPG-7 rocket launcher in one of the exchanges of fire and that they had six of them in their inventory at that time.

British Soldiers on patrol in Lenadoon Avenue

Another exchange of gunfire took place in the Ardoyne district during the battle, with an Official IRA Belfast Brigade gunman, Edward Brady (30), killed by the British Army and two British soldiers killed by gunmen from the Provisional IRA Belfast Brigade. Although the British Army claimed Edward Brady was an IRA member, and the Official IRA at the time claimed him as one of their members, his family in later years denied he was involved with any paramilitary group.

== Aftermath ==
The IRA continued to intensify their campaign of bombing, sniping and ambushes. Just one week after the end of the battles around Belfast, the Provisional IRA carried out one of its largest bombing operations ever. In what became known as Bloody Friday, they planted and exploded 22 car bombs in Belfast City in the space of 75 minutes, killing 9 people which included civilians, members of the security forces and a UDA member while also seriously injuring approximately 130 others.

== See also ==
- Battle at Springmartin
- Battle of St Matthew's
- Falls Curfew
- 1973 Old Bailey bombing
- 1997 Northern Ireland riots
