= Provisional IRA Honey Trap killings =

1973 IRA shooting in Belfast, Northern Ireland

IRA Honey Trap killings
- Part of the Troubles
- Location of the killings
- Location: 54°36′40″N 5°55′56″W; Antrim Road, Belfast, Northern Ireland
- Date: 23 March 1973; 21:00 GMT
- Attack type: shooting
- Weapons: Thompson submachine gun, pistol
- Deaths: 3 off-duty British soldiers
- Injuries: 1
- Perpetrators: Provisional IRA; Provisional IRA Belfast Brigade

The Provisional IRA Honey Trap killings occurred on 23 March 1973. Volunteers from the Provisional IRA's (IRA) Belfast Brigade shot dead three off-duty soldiers from the British Army who had been lured to a house by two females on the Antrim Road in Belfast, Northern Ireland. A fourth soldier survived the shooting.

== Background ==
In March 1971, three off-duty Scottish soldiers were shot dead in a so-called honeytrap. The men were persuaded to leave a bar by a female IRA operative who said she would take them to a party, and later killed by a roadside. This was the first time off-duty soldiers had been killed during The Troubles.

The killings of the three Scottish soldiers increased Unionist support for internment without trial, which was eventually introduced in August 1971 as Operation Demetrius. However, instead of decreasing violence, violence increased tenfold and support for the IRA grew stronger as the army and government reacted more harshly.

== Killings ==
About a week before the killings, two females met and befriended four British Army sergeants in a Belfast pub. The two women told the soldiers, who were stationed at British Army Headquarters at Thiepval Barracks in Lisburn, that they were having a party on 23 March and the six arranged to meet up.

On 23 March, the four off-duty sergeants, unarmed and in civilian clothes, met the two women at the Woodlands Hotel in Lisburn and later on that night the six drove 12 miles from Lisburn to a flat on the Antrim Road near the New Lodge area in Belfast, where the supposed party was taking place. The flat had food and drink laid out inside to allay any suspicions the soldiers may have had. Shortly after they arrived, one girl said she was going out to bring more women back with her. The one soldier who survived the shooting said that about half an hour after they had arrived two masked gunmen burst into the flat; one had a Thompson submachine gun and the other was carrying a pistol. The soldiers were taken into a bedroom and ordered to lie face down on a bed as the gunmen fired shots into their heads one at a time. Two of the sergeants died instantly, one died a few hours later in hospital and one survived, despite serious injuries to his spine as well as having part of his tongue and jaw shot off.

== Aftermath ==
Later that night, Loyalists shot dead a 28-year-old man outside his house in Durham Street, Belfast, from a passing car.

== See also ==
- Corporals killings
- 1988 Lisburn van bombing
