= Official IRA Belfast Brigade =

Belfast Brigade
- Active: December 1969 – May 1972 (sporadic actions occur after 1972 until the mid 70's)
- Allegiance: Official Irish Republican Army
- Size: 500–1,000
- Area of operations: Belfast, Northern Ireland
- Main actions: Battle of the Falls; Battle at Springmartin; Battle of Lenadoon

Commanders
- Notable commanders: Jim Sullivan; Joe McCann; Billy McMillen

The Official IRA's Belfast Brigade was founded in December 1969 after the Official IRA itself emerged in December 1969, shortly after the beginning of the Troubles, when the Irish Republican Army split into two factions. The other was the Provisional IRA. The "Officials" were Marxist-Leninists and worked to form a united front with other Irish communist groups, named the Irish National Liberation Front. The brigade, like the pre-split IRA brigade before the split, had three battalions, one in West Belfast, one in North Belfast and the third in East Belfast. The Belfast Brigade was involved in most of the biggest early confrontations of the conflict like the Falls Curfew in 1970, the battles that followed after the introduction of Internment without trial in 1971 and Volunteers joined forces with the Provisional brigade to fight the British Army and UVF during the Battle at Springmartin in 1972. The first commanding officer (CO) of the brigade was veteran Billy McMillen who fought during the IRA Border Campaign. Shortly after the death of Official IRA Belfast "Staff Captain" Joe McCann in April 1972, the battalion structure of the brigade was done away with and command centralized under McMillen.

== The Falls Curfew Battle ==
The Brigades first action against the British Army was during the defense of the Lower Falls during the Falls Curfew of July 1970. The British soldiers carrying out the Curfew orders were extremely hostile and threatening to the local people. Second in command of the Belfast Brigade Jim Sullivan organized a company of about 80–90 Volunteers to do battle with the British soldiers, they joined forces with a small unit from the Provisional IRA led by Brendan Hughes's cousin Charlie Hughes. In the battle four civilians were killed by the British army and about 60 civilians were hurt in the crossfire. 18 British soldiers were injured in the battle, 12 from gunshot wounds and 6 from grenades. A number of Officials were injured also, and a number were arrested including Commander Billy McMillen. This was the largest engagement between the IRA and British Army since the Irish War of Independence of 1919–1921.

== Notable actions and events ==
- 11 January 1970 - The Irish Republican Movement split into Provisional & Official wings. The Officials controlled most of Belfast immediately after the split.
- 3 - 5 July 1970 - Between 80 - 90 Volunteers from the Belfast Brigade engaged 3,000 British soldiers. See: Falls Curfew
- 8 March 1971 - Volunteers shot dead Provisional IRA commander Charles Hughes at Lesson Street on the Lower Falls while he was leaving his house. Tom Cahill the son of Joe Cahill was injured in the attack.
- 22 May 1971 - The first British soldier to die at the hands of the Official IRA, Robert Bankier of the Royal Green Jackets was killed by a unit led by Joe McCann. McCann's unit opened fire on a passing British mobile patrol near Cromac Square, hitting the patrol from both sides. He was the fourth British soldier to die on active service & the seventh overall since the conflict began.
- 9 - 10 August 1971 - During the introduction of Internment without trial OIRA staff captain Joe McCann led a small unit that held of a large number of British troops for a day to let people escape arrest in the Markets area of Belfast.
- 14 August 1971 - An Official IRA sniper shot dead British soldier John Robinson (21) while he was on mobile patrol in Butler Street, Ardoyne, Belfast during riots in the aftermath of internment.
- 23 September 1971 - Official IRA Volunteers Curry Rose (18) and Gerard O'Hare (17) were both killed in a premature bomb explosion while preparing a bomb in a house in Merrion Street, along the Lower Falls.
- 25 February 1972 - Volunteers from the Official IRA Belfast Brigade tried to kill Unionist politician and the then Minister of State for Home Affairs, John Taylor. He was hit a number of times, but survived
- 20 February 1975 - A feud between the OIRA and the newly formed Irish National Liberation Army (INLA) began when OIRA Volunteers from the Belfast Brigade shot dead Hugh Ferguson (19), then chairman of Whiterock IRSP. The feud lasted until 5 June 1975 and all the killings by both sides happened in Belfast. Six people were killed during the feud, three OIRA Volunteers and three IRSP/INLA Volunteers, the most prominent victim of the feud was former OIRA Belfast Brigade Commander Billy McMillen who was shot dead on the 28 April by rising INLA Volunteer Gerard Steenson who was just 18 at the time. Another IRA veteran Sean Garland was shot and injured on the 1 March 1975 in an estate in Dublin by an INLA hit team, this was the only attack that did not occur in Belfast.

== See also ==
- Official Sinn Féin
- Provisional Irish Republican Army
- Provisional Sinn Féin
- Workers' Party
- Eoghan Harris
- Henry McDonald (writer)
