= Jim Sullivan (Irish republican) =

Belfast City Councillor
- In office 1973–1981

Personal details
- Born: James Sullivan c. 1932 Lower Falls, Belfast, Northern Ireland
- Died: 16 September 1992 (Aged 60) Belfast, Northern Ireland
- Resting place: Milltown Cemetery
- Party: Workers' Party (from 1969); Sinn Féin (until 1969)
- Nickname: Solo

Military service
- Allegiance: Official Irish Republican Army
- Branch/service: Belfast Brigade
- Battles/wars: The Troubles

Jim Sullivan (c. 1932 – 16 September 1992) was a leading member of the Official Irish Republican Army from the lower Falls area of Belfast.

Sullivan was second in command of the Belfast Brigade of the Official IRA (under Billy McMillen) and played an important role in events in Belfast during the late 1960s and early 1970s. He was chairman of the Central Citizens' Defence Committees established in the city after the burning of many homes by loyalist mobs in the 1969 Northern Ireland Riots. He also played an important role in the Falls Curfew, a three-day gun battle in July 1970 between the Official IRA and the British Army.

In later years Sullivan played a leading role in the development of the Republican Clubs, which became the Workers' Party in 1982. In 1973 he was elected to Belfast City Council and retained his seat until the 1981 election when he lost it to the IRSP candidate, Sean Flynn.

His son, Seamus, was killed by the Ulster Defence Association at his workplace on Springfield Avenue just off the Falls Road on 3 September 1991.

He died on 16 September 1992 aged 60 and is buried at the OIRA/Workers' Party plot in Milltown Cemetery.
