= Brendan Hughes =

Irish republican (1948–2008)

- Early photograph of Brendan Hughes
- Born: June 1948; Lower Falls, Belfast, Northern Ireland
- Died: 16 February 2008 (aged 59); Belfast City Hospital, Belfast, Northern Ireland
- Military career
- Paramilitary: Provisional IRA
- Rank: Officer Commanding
- Nickname: "The Dark"
- Units: D Company, Belfast Brigade; Internal Security Unit
- Known for: 1980 Hunger strike
- Conflicts: The Troubles: August 1969 riots; Battle of the Lower Falls; Battle at Springmartin; Battle of Lenadoon; Bloody Friday; 1973 Old Bailey bombing (organizer)

Brendan Hughes (June 1948 – 16 February 2008) was a leading Irish republican, revolutionary socialist, and former Officer Commanding (OC) of the Belfast Brigade of the Provisional Irish Republican Army (IRA). His reputation with the republican cause would lead to nicknames like The Dark, and Darkie. He was the leader of the 1980 Irish hunger strike.

== Background ==
Hughes was born in June 1948 into an Irish Nationalist Catholic family from the Lower Falls area of Belfast, Northern Ireland. He joined the British Merchant Navy in the late 1960s, believing it would reduce the income burden on his father. He became involved in the republican movement after the 1969 riots, believing he would be protecting his community from Loyalist mobs.

He was a cousin of Charles Hughes, who was the O/C of D Company in the Provisional IRA Belfast Brigade during the Falls Curfew and who was shot and killed in March 1971 by the Official Irish Republican Army's Belfast Brigade during a feud between the Provisional and Official IRAs.

== IRA activity ==
Hughes joined the Irish Republican Army in 1969, sided with the Provisional faction in the split of 1969–70, and was "on the run" in Belfast by 1970. From 1970 to 1972, Hughes was involved in a number of attacks on British soldiers and bank robberies to raise funds for the republican movement. Hughes was key to the IRA's early activity in Belfast against the British Army, especially in and around the Falls Road area of Belfast, sometimes carrying out along with his unit as many as five operations a day against either the British Army or the RUC.

Hughes described his normal day during that period as "you would have had a call house [a safe meeting place] and you might have robbed a bank in the morning, done a float [gone out in a car looking for a British soldier] in the afternoon, stuck a bomb and a booby trap out after that, and then maybe had a gun battle or two later that night."

After the IRA-British truce of 1972 broke down in July, Hughes was an IRA commander during the Battle of Lenadoon, which quickly spread to other parts of Belfast. A number of civilians, British soldiers, and both Republican and Loyalist volunteers were injured or killed.

As Officer Commanding (OC) of the Provisional IRA Belfast Brigade, he was the main organiser of Bloody Friday, the biggest bombing attack ever carried out by the organisation in Belfast. On 21 July 1972, the IRA exploded 22 bombs all over the city, leaving nine dead, including two British soldiers, an Ulster Defence Association (UDA) member, two teenage boys, and a mother of seven; 130 people were injured. Hughes regarded the operation as a disaster, as he explained in an interview set up by Boston College:

I was the operational commander of the "Bloody Friday" operation. I remember when the bombs started to go off, I was in Leeson Street, and I thought, "There's too much here". I sort of knew there were going to be casualties, either [because] the Brits could not handle so many bombs or they would allow some to go off because it suited them to have casualties. I feel a bit guilty about it because, as I say, there was no intention to kill anyone that day. I have a fair deal of regret that 'Bloody Friday' took place ... a great deal of regret ... If I could do it over again I wouldn't do it.

On 19 July 1973, Hughes was arrested on the Falls Road along with Gerry Adams (later President of Sinn Féin between 1983 and 2018) and Tom Cahill. They were interrogated for more than twelve hours at the Springfield Road Royal Ulster Constabulary (RUC) barracks and later at Castlereagh, before being transported to Long Kesh.

On 8 December, Hughes escaped inside a rolled-up mattress in the back of a dustcart, and fled across the border to Dublin. After ten days he returned to Belfast after assuming a new identity, becoming a travelling toy salesman named "Arthur McAllister". For five months, Hughes lived in Myrtlefield Park near Malone Road, and was believed to be the new OC of the IRA in Belfast following the arrest of Ivor Bell in February.

On 10 May 1974, Hughes was arrested following a tip-off, and the house was found to contain a submachine gun, four rifles, two pistols and several thousand rounds of ammunition. Hughes was subsequently sentenced to fifteen years in prison. Three years after his arrest, Hughes was involved in a fracas and received an additional five-year sentence for assaulting a prison officer. As he was convicted after 1 March 1976, Hughes was transferred from the compounds to the H-Blocks and lost his Special Category Status. He refused to wear a prison uniform and joined the blanket protest. Shortly after arriving in the H-Blocks, Hughes became the OC of the IRA prisoners, and in March 1978 ordered the prisoners to begin the dirty protest.

Whilst in prison, Hughes formed a friendship with Shankill Butchers and Ulster Volunteer Force (UVF) member Robert Bates, who later foiled a UVF plot to assassinate Hughes.

== Hunger strike ==
Hughes was the Officer Commanding during the 1980 hunger strike. On 27 October 1980, against the wishes of the IRA Army Council, Hughes along with six other republican prisoners, including Tom McFeely, John Nixon, Sean McKenna, Tommy McKearney and Raymond McCartney, refused food and started a hunger strike.

During the second month of the hunger strike, the British government, led by Margaret Thatcher, sent an intermediary to inform Hughes of a possible compromise, despite previously having publicly rejected any compromise.

Hughes had promised one of the hunger strikers, Sean McKenna, that if McKenna slipped into a coma, Hughes would end the hunger strike. As McKenna was on the verge of death, Hughes found himself in a dilemma. Hughes assumed that the compromise was in good faith and ended the hunger strike after 53 days. However, when the document arrived at the prison there was disappointment at the final position of the British government.

Bobby Sands had taken over as leader of the republican prisoners in the prison after Hughes began his strike. On 1 March 1981, Sands began the second hunger strike, which Hughes opposed.

== Release ==
Hughes was released from prison in 1986, and returned to live in Belfast, staying initially at the home of Gerry Adams. He was appointed to the IRA's Internal Security Unit and liaised between IRA Northern Command and rural units in Tyrone and Armagh. In 1990, Hughes appeared at a press conference in Bilbao organised by Herri Batasuna, the political wing of the Basque nationalist paramilitary group ETA, to support an amnesty for ETA prisoners.

At the start of the 21st century, he became increasingly critical of the political direction of the Sinn Féin leadership. In 2000, he criticised the Sinn Féin leadership for allowing building firms in West Belfast to pay low wages to former prisoners and stated his belief that the republican leadership had sold out on their ideals to achieve peace in Northern Ireland.

In October 2006, Hughes was pictured on the front page of the Irish News wearing an eye patch after undergoing an operation to save his sight, which had been badly damaged due to his hunger strike. At some point before his death he had a heart attack, and although he received a bypass surgery, his condition continued to deteriorate thereafter.

== Death ==
At the beginning of February 2008, Hughes was hospitalised due to a chest infection and influenza, later falling into a coma. He died a week later on 16 February 2008 in Belfast City Hospital. He was 59.

In accordance with Hughes’ wishes, his ashes were buried or scattered in three places in Ireland: the grave of his parents; the ruins of his grandfather’s home in the Cooley mountains in County Louth, and at the D Company memorial on the Falls Road – but not at the Provisional plot in Milltown cemetery.

A memorial stone seat was erected to Hughes's memory in the vicinity in February 2011, but was smashed to pieces in a nighttime sledgehammer attack by unknown people shortly afterwards. It was later rebuilt.

== Post-death release of recording ==
In a recording released in 2013 after his death, Hughes named Gerry Adams as ordering the murder and secret burial of Jean McConville during the IRA's campaign in Belfast in 1972. Adams denied any role in the death of McConville and said Hughes had been lying.
