= Joe McCann =

Irish republican paramilitary

- Born: Joseph McCann; 2 November 1947; Lower Falls, Belfast, Northern Ireland
- Died: 15 April 1972 (aged 24); The Market, Belfast, Northern Ireland
- Cause of death: Gunshot wounds
- Resting place: Milltown Cemetery
- Political party: Republican Clubs
- Military career
- Allegiance: (Republic of Ireland) Irish Republic
- Paramilitaries: Fianna Éireann (1960–1964); Irish Republican Army (1964–1969); Official IRA (1969–1972)
- Service years: 1960–1972
- Rank: Officer Commanding
- Units: 3rd Battalion, Belfast Brigade
- Conflict: The Troubles: Falls Curfew

Joe McCann (2 November 1947 – 15 April 1972) was an Irish republican volunteer. A member of the Irish Republican Army and later the Official Irish Republican Army, he was active in politics from the early 1960s and participated in the early years of the Troubles in Northern Ireland. He was shot dead during a confrontation with RUC Special Branch members and British paratroopers in 1972.

== Early life ==
He was born in the former Pound Loney section of the Lower Falls area of West Belfast, and spent most of his life there and in the nearby Markets area of the city. His mother Jane McCann (née McGuire) died when he was four years old, leaving four children. His father remarried. By 1953, he and his family moved to the then-mixed Highfield estate off the Springfield road. He was educated at St Mary's grammar school on Barrack Street in Belfast, where he developed an interest in the Irish language. He was expelled from the school due to allegedly arguing about politics and religion with the Christian Brothers. He became an apprentice bricklayer at age 15. He joined the Fianna Éireann at age 12, and then joined the IRA in 1964 after his family moved to Turf Lodge.

In 1964 he was involved in a riot on Divis Street in Belfast in opposition to the threat from loyalist leader Ian Paisley to march on the area and remove an Irish tricolour flying over the election office of Billy McMillen. In 1965, he was arrested with five others after they disrupted an army recruitment event at St Gabriel's School in North Belfast. They refused to recognise the court and subsequently served nine months in Crumlin Road jail. He had expressed an interest in the priesthood while a teenager. He joined the Third Order of Saint Francis in his later teens, influenced by the Christian socialist Grille magazine which emphasised left-wing thinking within radical Christianity.

McCann was active in the IRA's involvement in the civil rights activism, protesting against the development of the Divis Flats. He became involved in housing issues and any matters which related to local government. In 1969, after sectarian rioting in Belfast, the IRA split into two factions: the newly created Provisional Irish Republican Army, traditionalist militarists; and the existing organisation, which became known as the Official IRA, Marxist-Leninist-oriented socialists. McCann sided with the Officials. His brothers Dennis, Patrick and Brian, also joined the Official IRA.

== Personal life ==
McCann married Anne McKnight who hailed from a strong republican family in the Markets area in Belfast. Anne's older brother, Bobby, was part of the 1956–62 border campaign and was arrested and jailed, as well as later being interned. In the 1964 election, Bobby unsuccessfully ran as a Republican candidate for Belfast South.

== IRA activities ==
McCann was appointed Officer Commanding and operations officer of the Third Battalion of the Belfast Brigade, which was centred around the Market area of Belfast. By 1970, violence in Northern Ireland had escalated to the point where British soldiers were deployed there in large numbers. From 3–5 July 1970, McCann was involved in gun battles during the Falls Curfew between the Official IRA and up to 3,000 British soldiers in the Lower Falls area that left four civilians dead from gunshot wounds, another killed after being hit by an armoured car and 60 injured. On 22 May 1971, the first British soldier reported to be killed by the Official IRA, Robert Bankier of the Royal Green Jackets was killed by a unit led by McCann, which opened fire on a passing British mobile patrol near Cromac Square, hitting the patrol from both sides. He was the fourth British soldier to die on active service, and the seventh overall since the conflict began.

In another incident, McCann led a unit which captured three Ulster Volunteer Force (UVF) members in Sandy Row. The UVF had raided an Official IRA arms dump earlier that day and the Officials announced they would execute the three prisoners if the weapons were not returned. McCann eventually released the three UVF members, allegedly because they were "working class men".

On 9 August 1971, his unit took over the Inglis bakery in the Markets area, following the introduction of internment without trial by the Northern Ireland authorities. They defended it throughout the night from 600 British soldiers who were seeking to arrest paramilitary suspects. The action allowed other IRA members to slip out of the area and avoid arrest. He was photographed during the incident, holding an M1 carbine, against the background of a burning building and the Starry Plough flag.

In early February 1972, he was reported to be involved in the attempted assassination of Ulster Unionist politician and Northern Ireland Minister for Home Affairs John Taylor in Armagh City, outside the then Hibernian Bank on Russell Street. McCann and another gunman fired on Taylor's car with Thompson submachine guns, hitting him five times in the neck and head; he survived, though he was badly injured. In another incident McCann and another man were standing outside a Belfast cinema to purchase tickets for the film Soldier Blue when McCann spotted a British Army checkpoint.

== Death ==
McCann was killed on 15 April 1972 in Joy Street in The Markets by soldiers from the 1st Battalion, Parachute Regiment. He had returned to Belfast shortly before being killed and was at the top of the RUC Special Branch wanted list. He was told by the Official IRA Belfast command to return for his own safety to Dublin. However he ignored their requests and remained in Belfast.

The RUC Special Branch was aware of his presence in Belfast and were on the look out for him. On the morning of his death, he was spotted by an RUC officer who reported his whereabouts to the Parachute Regiment, who were carrying out a road block at the junction of May and Joy Streets in the Markets area at the time. McCann was approached by an RUC officer who informed him that he was under arrest. McCann was unarmed and tried to run to evade arrest when fired on by the soldiers. He was shot dead in Joy Street just before the junction with Hamilton Street.

McCann was hit 3 times according to the pathology report, the fatal shot hitting him in the buttock and passing up through his internal organs. In the court case of the two surviving soldiers evidence was provided that soldier 'B' fired 4 shots, soldiers 'A' and 'C' fired one shot each. No ballistics tests took place so none of the bullets that hit McCann could be attributed to any particular individual soldier.

Ten cartridge cases were counted by a local shop owner, Mrs Connolly, outside her shop alone, these had come from one soldier who was kneeling directly outside her shop. Bullet holes were also visible in the walls of nearby houses in both Joy and Hamilton streets.

McCann was among the most militant of the Official IRA's Belfast volunteers and far more enthusiastic about "armed struggle" in Northern Ireland than the Official IRA leadership. His killing was closely followed by the organisation calling a ceasefire. It was rumoured that McCann was unarmed when he was killed because the Official IRA leadership had confiscated his personal weapon, a .38 pistol.

Some former Official IRA members alleged that McCann's killing was set up by their Dublin leadership who were unhappy with his militancy and favoured a ceasefire.

Five days of rioting followed his death. Turf Lodge, where McCann lived, was a no-go area and was openly patrolled by an Official IRA Land Rover with the words "Official IRA – Mobile Patrol" emblazoned on the side. The Official IRA shot five British soldiers, killing three, in revenge for McCann's killing, in different incidents the following day in Belfast, Derry and Newry.

== Funeral and tributes ==
McCann's funeral on 18 April 1972 was attended by thousands of mourners. A guard of honour was provided by 20 Official IRA volunteers and a further 200 women followed carrying flowers and wreaths. Four MPs were also in attendance: Paddy Devlin, Paddy O'Hanlon (both SDLP), Paddy Kennedy (Republican Labour), and Bernadette Devlin (Independent Republican). Cathal Goulding the Official IRA Chief of Staff, provided the graveside oration in Milltown Cemetery. Goulding said:

By shooting Joe McCann [the British government's] Whitelaws and their Heaths and their Tuzos have shown the colour of their so called peace initiatives. They have re-declared war on the people...We have given notice, by action that no words can now efface, that those who are responsible for the terrorism that is Britain's age old reaction to Irish demands will be the victim of that terrorism, paying richly in their own red blood for their crimes and the crimes of their imperial masters.

Despite this hardline rhetoric, however, Goulding called a ceasefire just six weeks later, on 29 May 1972. One of the more surprising tributes to McCann came from Gusty Spence, leader of the Ulster Volunteer Force loyalist group. Spence wrote a letter of sympathy to McCann's widow, expressing his, "deepest and profoundest sympathy" on the death of her husband. "He was a soldier of the Republic and I a Volunteer of Ulster and we made no apology for being what we were or are...Joe once did me a good turn indirectly and I never forgot him for his humanity". This is thought to refer to an incident in which three UVF men wandered into the Lower Falls, were captured by Official IRA men, but were released unharmed on McCann's orders.

In 1997, a plaque was unveiled at the spot on Joy Street in the Markets where McCann was killed. Members of the various republican factions, the Workers' Party (political wing of the Official IRA), Sinn Féin (political wing of the Provisional IRA) and the Irish Republican Socialist Party (political wing of the Irish National Liberation Army, a splinter of the Official IRA in 1974) were all in attendance.

== Inquiry and trial ==
In 2010, the Historical Enquiries Team investigation into the killing of Joe McCann found it was unjustified.

In December 2016, two former British soldiers, known as Soldier A and Soldier C, were arrested and charged with murder. The trial commenced in Belfast April 2021. In May 2021, the trial collapsed and the two soldiers were acquitted. The judge found that the soldiers' statements given in 1972 to the Royal Military Police, on which the prosecution was based, were inadmissible because the statements were provided without the soldiers being under caution. The family are set to apply to the Attorney General to request an inquest.
