= Mary Holland (journalist) =

Irish journalist

Mary Holland (19 June 1935 – 7 June 2004) was an Irish journalist who specialised in writing about Ireland and in particular Northern Ireland. Born in Dover but raised in Ireland, she married a British diplomat, Ronald Higgins; they lived in Indonesia but the marriage was annulled.

She originally worked in fashion for Vogue magazine and then The Observer. She came to prominence as one of the first Irish journalists to report on the rise of the Northern Ireland Civil Rights Association and became an increasingly prominent commentator on the affairs of the region.

In 1977 Conor Cruise O'Brien was appointed editor-in-chief of the paper. O'Brien was a writer and politician who served as a government minister in the Oireachtas (Irish Parliament). He was often criticized for his uncompromising opposition to "physical force Irish republicanism", and his actions to that end during Liam Cosgrave's tenure as Taoiseach were labelled as censorship by some. Shortly after starting as editor, O'Brien sent a memo to Holland:

It is a very serious weakness of your coverage of Irish affairs that you are a very poor judge of Irish Catholics. That gifted and talkative community includes some of the most expert conmen and conwomen in the world and I believe you have been conned.

Holland subsequently left The Observer and joined The Irish Times as their Northern Ireland correspondent.

In 1988, she witnessed the IRA Corporals killings.
