= Corporals killings =

1988 killings in Belfast, Northern Ireland

- Part of March 1988 in the Troubles and Operation Banner
- Father Alec Reid administers the last rites to Corporal David Howes.
- Location: 54°34′28″N 05°59′16″W; Andersonstown, Belfast, Northern Ireland
- Date: 19 March 1988
- Target: British Army personnel
- Attack type: Shooting, stabbing
- Deaths: 2
- Perpetrator: Provisional Irish Republican Army

On 19 March 1988, the British Army corporals Derek Wood and David Howes were attacked by members of a crowd attending a funeral of an IRA member, and were later shot dead by the Provisional Irish Republican Army (IRA) in Belfast, Northern Ireland.

Wearing civilian clothes, both armed with Browning Hi-Power pistols and in a civilian car, the soldiers drove into the funeral procession of an IRA member, seemingly by mistake. Three days before, the loyalist Michael Stone had attacked an IRA funeral and killed three people. Believing the soldiers were loyalists intent on repeating Stone's attack, dozens of people surrounded and attacked their car. During this, Corporal Wood drew his service pistol and fired a shot into the air. The soldiers were then dragged from the car and taken to a nearby sports ground where they were beaten, stripped and searched. They were then driven to a nearby waste ground where they were shot dead.

The incident was filmed by an overhead British Army helicopter and television news cameras; the images have been described by journalist Peter Taylor as some of the "most dramatic and harrowing" of the conflict in Northern Ireland.

Two men were sentenced to life imprisonment for murder but were released in 1998 under the terms of the Good Friday Agreement. Several other men received lesser sentences for their part in the murders.

== Background ==
The killings took place against a backdrop of violence at high-profile Irish republican funerals. The presence of large numbers of riot police and soldiers at IRA funerals was criticized for sparking unrest. On 6 March 1988, three unarmed IRA members alleged to have been preparing for a bomb attack on British military personnel were killed by the Special Air Service (SAS) in Gibraltar during Operation Flavius. Their joint funeral was due to be held in Belfast's Milltown Cemetery on 16 March. The security forces agreed to stay away from the funeral in exchange for guarantees that there would be no three-volley salute by IRA gunmen. A member of the Ulster Defence Association (UDA), Michael Stone, learned of this agreement. He attacked the funeral with pistols and grenades, killing three people and wounding more than sixty.

One of those killed was IRA member Caoimhín Mac Brádaigh. Mac Brádaigh's funeral, just three days after Stone's attack, took place amid an extremely tense atmosphere, and those attending feared another loyalist attack. Those attending the funeral included IRA members who acted as stewards.

Derek Tony Wood, aged 24, and David Robert Howes, aged 23, were corporals in the British Army's Royal Corps of Signals. According to the British Army, Wood and Howes ignored general orders to stay away from the area where the funeral was being held. It has been presumed that the two men accidentally drove into the procession. Howes had arrived in Northern Ireland one week before. Soldiers and police officers suggested that the corporals had gone "wandering", and that Wood was showing his newly arrived colleague the republican districts of Belfast. Former British soldier Seán Hartnett stated the corporals were members of the Royal Corps of Signals attached to a military surveillance unit known as the Joint Communications Unit (JCU).

== Killings ==
Corporal Derek Wood produces a weapon as he tries to hold back the crowd.

Corporals Wood and Howes were wearing civilian clothes and driving in a silver Volkswagen Passat hatchback. The Mac Brádaigh funeral was making its way along the Andersonstown Road towards Milltown Cemetery when the corporals' car appeared from the opposite direction. The car was driven straight towards the front of the funeral, which was headed by several black taxis. It was driven past a Sinn Féin steward who had signalled the driver to turn. Mourners at the funeral said they believed they were under attack from Ulster loyalists. The driver then mounted a pavement, scattering mourners, and turned into a small side road. When this road was blocked, the driver then reversed at speed, ending up within the funeral procession. Wood attempted to drive the car out of the procession but his exit route was blocked by a black taxi.

An angry crowd surrounded the car, smashed the windows and attempted to drag the soldiers out. Wood produced a Browning Hi-Power 9mm handgun, which each of the soldiers was armed with. Wood climbed partly out of a window and fired a shot in the air, which briefly scattered the crowd. The crowd then surged back, with some of them attacking the car with a wheel-brace and a stepladder snatched from a photographer. The men were eventually pulled from the car and punched and kicked to the ground.

The attack was witnessed by the media and passers-by. Journalist Mary Holland recalled seeing one of the men being dragged past a group of journalists: "He didn't cry out; just looked at us with terrified eyes, as though we were all enemies in a foreign country who wouldn't have understood what language he was speaking if he called out for help."

They were taken to the Casement Park sports ground opposite. Here they were beaten, stripped to their underpants and socks, and searched by a small group of men. The BBC and The Independent wrote that the men were tortured. A search revealed that the men were British soldiers. Their captors found a military ID on Howes which was marked "Herford", the site of a British military base in Germany, but it is believed they misread it as "Hereford", the headquarters of the SAS.

The Redemptorist priest Father Alec Reid, who later played a significant part in the peace process leading to the Good Friday Agreement, intervened and attempted to save the soldiers, and asked people to call an ambulance.

I got down between the two of them and I had my arm around this one and I was holding this one up by the shoulder .... They were so disciplined, they just lay there totally still and I decided to myself they were soldiers. There was a helicopter circling overhead and I don't know why they didn't do something, radio to the police or soldiers to come up, because there were these two of their own soldiers.

One of the captors warned Reid not to interfere and ordered two men to take him away.

The two soldiers were placed in a taxi and driven around to a waste ground near Penny Lane (South Link), just 200 yd (180 m) off the main Andersonstown Road. There they were taken out of the vehicle and shot dead. Wood was shot six times: twice in the head and four times in the chest. He had also been stabbed four times in the back of the neck. Howes was shot five times: once in the head and four times in the body. Each also had multiple injuries to other parts of their bodies. The perpetrators quickly left the scene.

Reid heard the shots and rushed to the waste ground. He believed one of the soldiers was still breathing and attempted to give him mouth-to-mouth resuscitation. Upon realising that the soldiers were dead, he gave them the last rites. According to the photographer David Cairns, although photographers were having their films confiscated by the IRA, he was able to keep his by quickly leaving the area after taking a photograph of Reid kneeling beside the almost naked body of Howes, administering the last rites. Cairns' photograph was later named one of the best pictures of the past 50 years by Life.

The whole incident was filmed by a British Army helicopter hovering overhead. An unnamed soldier of the Royal Scots said his eight-man patrol was nearby and saw the attack on the corporals' car, but were told not to intervene. Soldiers and police arrived on the scene three minutes after the corporals had been shot. A British Army spokesman said the army did not respond immediately because they needed time to assess the situation and were wary of being ambushed by the IRA. The large funeral procession also prevented them getting to the scene quickly.

Shortly after, the IRA released a statement:

The Belfast brigade, IRA, claims responsibility for the execution of two SAS members who launched an attack on the funeral cortege of our comrade volunteer Kevin Brady. The SAS unit was initially apprehended by the people lining the route in the belief that armed loyalists were attacking them and they were removed from the immediate vicinity. Our volunteers forcibly removed the two men from the crowd and, after clearly ascertaining their identities from equipment and documentation, we executed them.

== Aftermath ==
Northern Ireland Secretary Tom King acknowledged that the Milltown Cemetery attack and the killing of Wood and Howes were "wholly unacceptable and do require immediate review in regard to policing to be followed at any future funeral". The Conservative MP Michael Mates defended the "hands off" policy, saying "A return to heavy-handed policing could provoke riots, which is what the IRA want so they can say to the world 'They won't even let us bury our dead in peace.'" The Fine Gael leader Alan Dukes, Labour leader Dick Spring and Taoiseach Charles Haughey all condemned the killings. The British prime minister at the time, Margaret Thatcher, called the killings "an act of appalling savagery".

On 2 August 1988, Lance Corporal Roy Butler of the Ulster Defence Regiment was shot and killed in Belfast with one of the guns taken from the corporals.

Two men, Alex Murphy and Harry Maguire, were found guilty of the murder of the corporals. They were jailed for life in 1989, with a recommendation of a minimum 25 years. Murphy received a further 83 years, and Maguire 79 years, for bodily harm, falsely imprisoning the soldiers, and possessing a gun and ammunition. Sir Brian Hutton, sentencing, said

All murders are brutal, but the murders of Corporal Howes and Corporal Wood were particularly savage and vicious ... They were stripped of most of their clothing and they lay in their own blood in the back of the taxi when you took them to the waste ground to be killed, and in that pitiable and defenceless state you brought about their murders as they lay on the ground.

Both men had been listed as senior members of the IRA's Belfast Brigade. In 1973, at the age of 15, Murphy had been the youngest republican internee in Long Kesh prison, which later became known as the Maze. Maguire became a member of the IRA's "camp staff" in the Maze, one of the senior IRA men effectively in control of the republican wings, and met Northern Ireland Secretary Mo Mowlam when she visited the jail to negotiate with prisoners. In November 1998, Murphy and Maguire were released from the Maze prison as part of the early prisoner release scheme under the Good Friday Agreement. Maguire is now chairman of the Belfast office of Community Restorative Justice Ireland, a police-supported group aimed at dealing with low-level crime through mediation and intended to replace the practice of "punishment beatings" and kneecappings by paramilitaries.

A further three men were in 1990 found guilty by common purpose of aiding and abetting the murder. The men (Pat Kane, Mickey Timmons, and Seán Ó Ceallaigh) were dubbed the "Casement Three" by republicans who disputed the validity of their convictions. Kane's conviction was quashed on appeal due to the unreliability of his confession. Ó Ceallaigh was released in 1998 under the Good Friday Agreement.

Terence Clarke, the chief steward on the day, was sentenced to seven years' imprisonment for assaulting Wood. Clarke had served as Gerry Adams' bodyguard; he died of cancer in 2000.

In March 2018, BBC Two aired the Vanessa Engle documentary, The Funeral Murders, which included eyewitness testimonies of the events of that day.

== See also ==
- 1971 Scottish soldiers' killings
- 2000 Ramallah lynching, a similar incident in the Palestinian Territories

== Sources ==
- O'Brien, Brendan (1999). The long war: the IRA and Sinn Féin. Irish studies (2 ed.). Syracuse, New York: Syracuse University Press. ISBN 0815605978.
- Ryder, Chris (1991). The Ulster Defence Regiment: an instrument of peace?. London: Methuen. ISBN 0-413-64800-1.
- Taylor, Peter (2002). Brits: the war against the IRA. London: Bloomsbury. ISBN 9780747558064.
