= Andersonstown =

Suburb of Belfast, United Kingdom

Coordinates: 54°34′42″N 5°59′38″W

Andersonstown: Irish: Baile Andarsan or Baile Mhic Aindréis; Scots: Andersontoon
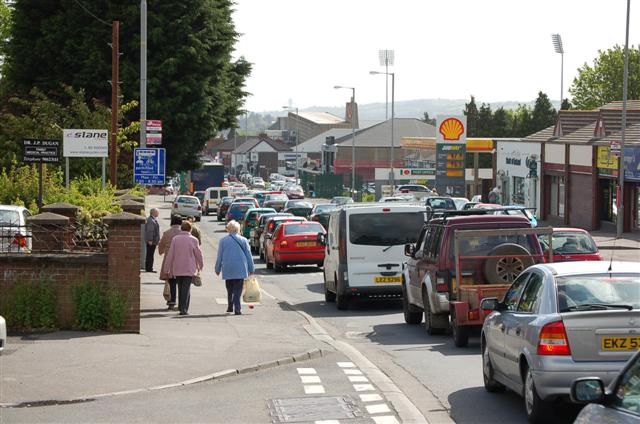
- Andersonstown Road, 2007
- Population: 4,602 (2021 census)
- OS grid reference: NW4190927083
- District: Belfast City Council
- County: County Antrim
- Country: Northern Ireland
- Sovereign state: United Kingdom
- Post town: BELFAST
- Postcode district: BT11
- Dialling code: 028
- UK Parliament: Belfast West
- NI Assembly: Belfast West

Andersonstown, known colloquially as Andytown, is a suburb of west Belfast, Northern Ireland, at the foot of the Black Mountain and Divis Mountain. It contains a mixture of public and private housing and is largely a working-class area with a strong Irish nationalist and Irish Catholic tradition. It had a population of 4,602 in 2021.

The area stretches between the Shaws Road, the Glen Road and the Andersonstown Road.

== History ==
The area is in County Antrim. Historically, it was part of the Barony of Belfast Upper, the parish of Shankill and the townland of Ballydownfine (from Irish Baile Dhún Fionn 'townland of the white fort'). However, the original collection of houses known as Anderson's Town centred near the fork of the Glen Road and Falls Road which actually lies within the townland of Ballymurphy (Baile Uí Mhurchú). The area was also known as Whitesidetown after the family that owned the land, but they were dispossessed for the support they gave to the Society of United Irishmen, resulting in a change of name. In 1832, it was described as a village consisting of eleven families, some of whom were named Anderson. The Andersons are likely to have been of Scottish Lowland descent.

Most of what is now Andersonstown was a farm named 'Maryburne', owned by a family named Collins; however, after a family dispute the land was sold off. The settlement then rapidly developed in the 1950s and 1960s as the local housing authority built hundreds of houses for people who were rehoused during the redevelopment of the lower Falls Road district. As the population of the area increased, Twinbrook and Poleglass housing estates were built further out of Belfast. The area is bounded by Andersonstown Road on the south, Glen Road on the north and Shaw's Road on the west.

The Black Mountain district electoral area consists of six electoral wards: Shaw's Road, Andersonstown, Colin Glen, Turf Lodge, Falls Park and Beechmount. The electoral ward named Andersonstown and that named Shaw's Road covers the area of Andersonstown.

== Features ==
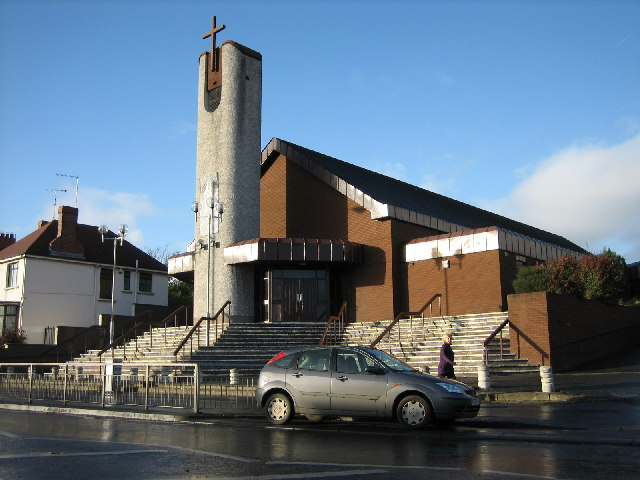
St Agnes' Church, Andersonstown

In 2008, Andersonstown ward had a population of 5,064.

There are five Catholic churches in the area: St Agnes' and St. Michael's and St Teresa's, St Matthias', and Holy Spirit Church.

There are several schools including Holy Child Primary School and De La Salle College. St Genevieve's High School for girls is situated at the junction of Stewartstown and Andersonstown Roads. St Mary's Christian Brothers' Grammar School and the All Saints College are located on the upper Glen Road.

The area also includes a number of leisure and outdoor spaces, including Andersonstown Leisure Centre, Falls Park and Milltown Cemetery.

== Sport ==
Casement Park, the main Gaelic Athletic Association stadium for Antrim GAA, is in Andersonstown.

Donegal Celtic F.C., an association football club, play their home games at Donegal Celtic Park on Suffolk Road on the outskirts of Andersontown. In 1990, an Irish Cup game between Donegal Celtic and Linfield F.C., a club with a mainly Protestant following, was moved away from the area on the orders of police due to fears that violence would break out. The game was played at Windsor Park, but despite the move a riot broke out anyway.

On the Glen Road, the path that leads into the mountains known as Glen Road Heights is home to both Sport & Leisure Swifts F.C. and St. Teresa's GAC, with the two clubs grounds being almost adjacent to one another.

== Culture and media ==
The local newspaper, the Andersonstown News, voices an Irish Republican viewpoint. Produced by the Belfast Media Group, which also publishes papers in other areas of the city, editions appear on Mondays and Thursdays.

The district is also the subject of the novel Titanic Town by Mary Costello and the movie adaptation by Anne Devlin.

== Politics ==
The area is part of the Black Mountain district electoral area for Belfast City Council. In the 2023 Belfast City Council election this district elected six councillors for Sinn Féin and one councillor for the SDLP.

In the 1970s, 1980s, and 1990s, the area was a major centre of civil disturbances during the social-political conflict known as The Troubles. A large British army fort – known as Silver City – was built in the central Broom Hill part of Andersonstown. There was generally less strife than in, for instance, neighbouring districts such as Lenadoon, which in 1972 saw clashes between the IRA and Ulster Defence Association and a subsequent demographic shift in the estate from Protestant to Catholic, and Ballymurphy, the scene of the Ballymurphy massacre and Springhill massacre.

On 5 April 1979, two British Army soldiers were shot dead by the Provisional Irish Republican Army (IRA) whilst closing security gates at Andersonstown joint Royal Ulster Constabulary (RUC) and British Army base. The PIRA in Andersonstown was part of the First Battalion of the Provisional IRA Belfast Brigade.

On 26 June 1980, Miriam Daly, a lecturer at Queen's University Belfast and an Irish Republican Socialist Party activist, was found tied up and shot dead at her home in the area. The murder was widely blamed on loyalist paramilitaries, but no group ever claimed responsibility.

Kieran Doherty, a Teachta Dála who was one of the ten republican prisoners to die during the 1981 Irish hunger strike, was a native of Andersonstown.

== Adjacent areas ==
Andersonstown is the main area beyond the Falls Road although it is bordered by several other areas that form the Upper Falls District Electoral Area. On the south side of the Andersonstown Road the main district is Ladybrook, which is approximately bordered by Finaghy Road North (which leads to the Finaghy area and the Upper Lisburn Road) and the M1 motorway. Riverdale Estate was built in the 1940s to accommodate both privately bought and privately rented tenants. This area is bounded by Andersonstown Road and the M1 Motorway to the rear south side. Ladybrook is adjacent to the Blacks Road area which is the only predominantly loyalist section of what is otherwise a mostly republican locality. The area, also known as Suffolk, the name of the townland, is home to around 800 Protestants and is represented by the Suffolk Community Forum, a group which since 1996 has co-operated in the Suffolk Lenadoon Interface Group with its Catholic neighbours. The close proximity of Suffolk to neighbouring republican areas has led to the development of an interface area at the junction with the Stewartstown Road (which the Andersonstown Road merges at the junction with Shaw's Road). The interface, which is close to the fortified Woodbourne Police Service of Northern Ireland barracks, has seen numerous clashes between youths from the areas.

The barracks are on the site of the former Woodbourne House Hotel, which was destroyed in the earliest days of the Troubles.

To the north of the Stewartstown Road is the Lenadoon area, which is bordered by Shaw's Road. Lenadoon includes an eponymous public park which was redesigned in 2000. Lenadoon was previously a mixed area and indeed in the early stages of the Troubles the Ulster Defence Association (UDA) was active in the area but following the street violence of the early 1970s Protestants moved out and the area became almost wholly Catholic. The Suffolk Road area lies further west and is home to Donegal Celtic. Suffolk includes Blacks Road and as a result is a source of conflict between rival gangs of youths.

The area around Suffolk Road was previously considered part of the Protestant Suffolk area (and a Church of Ireland church stands on the corner of the Stewartstown Road here) with Lenadoon Avenue forming an interface. In 1972 this street was the scene of violence that brought an end to a short-lived Provisional IRA ceasefire. Several houses were left empty in the street until the IRA accompanied a Catholic family into one after the family's move had been approved by the Northern Ireland Housing Executive. This attracted a crowd of UDA members and supporters who attacked the houses and before long the British Army arrived on the scene. A stand-off followed for several days until the IRA decided to accompany another removal lorry with another Catholic family into the street but at the last moment the army, fearing a riot, rammed the vehicle with an armoured car. The republican supporters erupted in an angry display, resulting in the soldiers firing rubber bullets, CS gas and water cannons. The Provisionals accused the army and Secretary of State for Northern Ireland William Whitelaw of going back on earlier negotiations and favouring the loyalists. By the evening of the event the IRA announced an end to its ceasefire as a direct response to events at Lenadoon and a gun battle with the army and UDA ensued.

The Glengoland area, which borders on Colin Glen Forest Park between the Stewartstown Road and the Glen Road, represented the western edge of the Belfast City Council area. After the Suffolk Road junction Stewartstown Road entered the jurisdiction of Lisburn City Council, heading towards Poleglass and the surrounding areas. However following the reform of local government in Northern Ireland that preceded the 2014 local elections these areas were absorbed into an expanded Belfast City Council.

== See also ==
- Battle of Lenadoon
