= Falls Curfew =

British Army operation in Belfast in 1970

- Part of the Troubles/Operation Banner
Date	3–5 July 1970
Location	Belfast, Northern Ireland
Result	Military Stalemate; Curfew broken in the aftermath: Large number of Official IRA weapons captured by British Army; 337 people arrested; Curfew broken by neighbouring residents; 4 civilians killed & several other civilians injured by the British Army

Belligerents
(United Kingdom) British Government	Official IRA; Provisional IRA

Commanders and leaders
(United Kingdom) Sir Ian Freeland	Jim Sullivan; Billy McMillen; Charles Hughes; Brendan Hughes

Units involved
British Army	Belfast Brigade; D Company, Belfast Brigade

Strength
3,000 soldiers	80–90 volunteers 11 volunteers

Casualties and losses
18 wounded	Unknown; Several wounded
- 4 civilians killed 60 civilians wounded

The Falls Curfew, also called the Battle of the Falls (or Lower Falls), was a British Army operation during 3–5 July 1970 in the Falls district of Belfast, Northern Ireland. The operation began as a search for weapons in the staunchly Irish nationalist district. As the search ended, local youths attacked the British soldiers with stones and petrol bombs and the soldiers responded with CS gas. This quickly developed into gun battles between British soldiers and the Irish Republican Army (IRA). After four hours of continuous clashes, the British commander sealed off the area, which comprised 3,000 homes, and imposed a curfew which would last for 34 hours. Thousands of British troops moved into the curfew zone and carried out house-to-house searches for weapons, while coming under intermittent attack from the IRA and rioters. The searches caused much destruction, and a large amount of CS gas was fired into the area. Many residents complained of suffering abuse at the hands of the soldiers. On 5 July, the curfew was brought to an end when thousands of women and children from Andersonstown marched into the curfew zone with food and other supplies for the locals.

During the operation, four civilians were killed by the British Army, at least 78 people were wounded and 337 were arrested. Eighteen soldiers were also wounded. Large quantities of weapons and ammunition were captured. The British Army admitted afterwards that some of its soldiers had been involved in looting. The Falls Curfew was a turning point in the Troubles. It is seen as having turned many Catholics/Irish nationalists against the British Army and having boosted support for the IRA.

== Background ==
The Northern Ireland riots of August 1969 marked the beginning of the Troubles. In Belfast, Catholic Irish nationalists clashed with Protestant Ulster loyalists and the mainly-Protestant Royal Ulster Constabulary (RUC), Northern Ireland's police force. Hundreds of Catholic homes and businesses were burnt out and more than 1,000 families, mostly Catholics, were forced to flee. The rioting ended with Operation Banner, the deployment of British troops. In December 1969, the IRA split into the 'Official' IRA and 'Provisional' IRA, with the 'Provisionals' promising to defend Catholic areas.

A week before the Falls Curfew, on Saturday 27 June 1970, there was severe rioting in Belfast following marches by the Protestant/unionist Orange Order. At the Short Strand, a Catholic enclave in a Protestant part of the city, the Provisional IRA fought a five-hour gun battle with loyalists. Three people were killed, and the loyalists withdrew; the Provisional IRA presented itself as having successfully defended a vulnerable Catholic enclave from armed loyalist mobs.

Meanwhile, the Official IRA arranged for a large number of weapons to be brought into the mainly nationalist and Catholic Lower Falls area for distribution. The area was a stronghold of the Official IRA.

== Operation ==
=== Initial weapons search ===
At about 4:30 pm on Friday, 3 July, the RUC and British soldiers from the Royal Scots regiment entered the Lower Falls to carry out a weapons search. An informer had told them they would find an arms dump belonging to the Official IRA in a house on Balkan Street. A column of five or six armoured vehicles arrived at the house and sealed off the street. The search lasted about 45 minutes and uncovered 15 pistols, a rifle, a submachine gun and a large quantity of ammunition.

As the search ended and the troops began to leave, a crowd of youths on Raglan Street tried to block their path and pelted them with stones. The troops replied by launching CS gas at the crowd. The youths continued to throw stones and the soldiers responded with more CS gas. According to a local republican: "it being the week after Short Strand... they were angry that the Army was going to disarm their only means of defence".

=== Gun battles and rioting ===
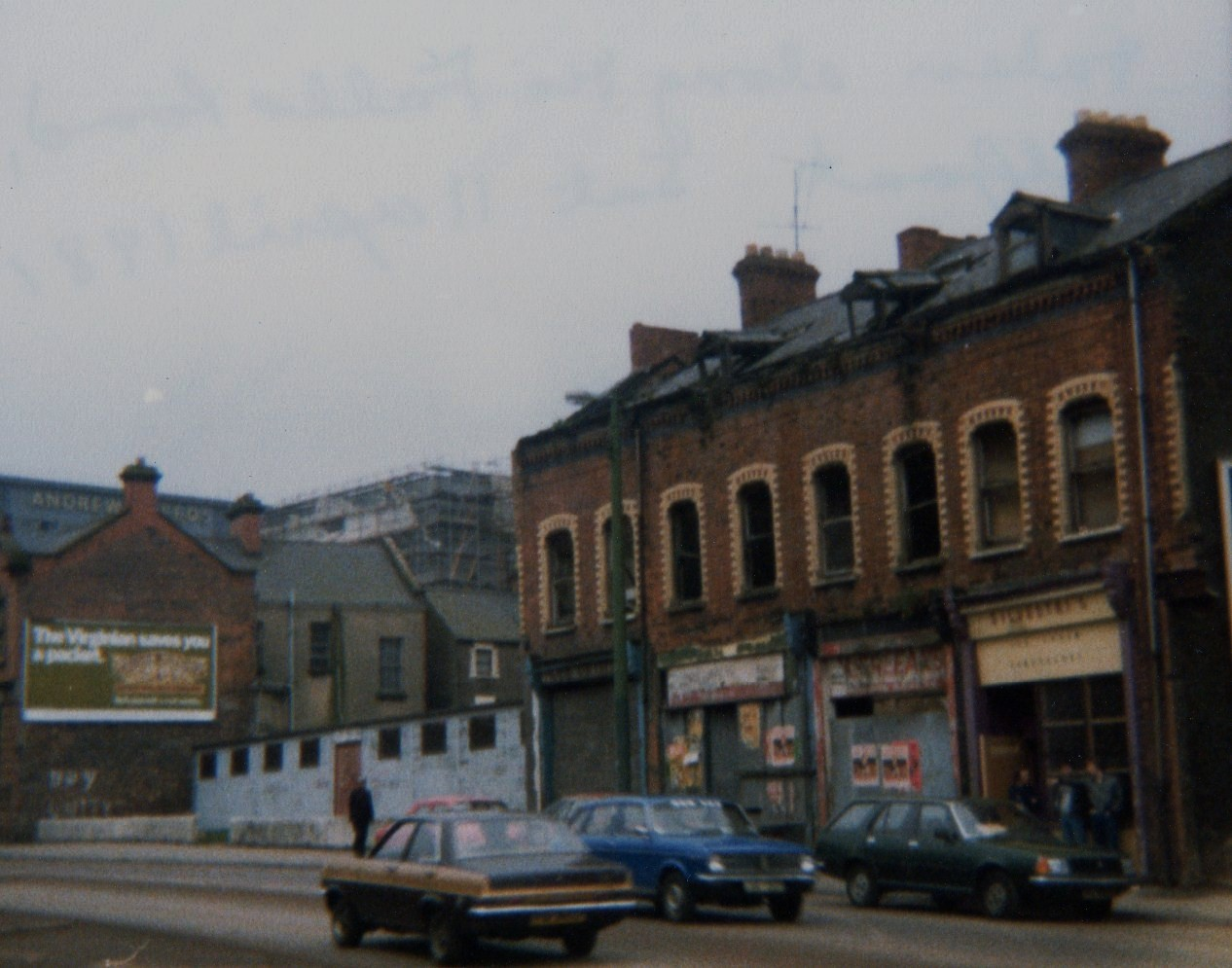
The Falls Road in 1981

The stone-throwing escalated into a riot. The soldiers became surrounded and called for reinforcements. Over the following hours, the Royal Scots would be reinforced by troops from the Black Watch, the Life Guards, the Devonshire and Dorset Regiment, the Gloucestershire Regiment and the Duke of Edinburgh's Royal Regiment.

As troops began to arrive at the edge of the district, locals hastily barricaded a number of streets to keep the soldiers out. Buses were hijacked and made into burning barricades.

Jim Sullivan, the local Official IRA commander, feared that the troops would launch a bigger raid and instructed his men to move weapons out of the area. At about 6pm, Provisional IRA volunteers attacked the troops with improvised hand grenades. A number of soldiers suffered leg injuries. As more troops arrived, "the Officials realized that they would have to fight" and Sullivan ordered his men to confront the troops. An Official IRA source later said, "The way we looked at it, we were not going to put up our hands and let them take the weaponry. We didn't want the confrontation, but we couldn't surrender". One source said that 60–70 Official IRA volunteers were involved, while another said 80–90. Each was armed with a rifle and at least one revolver. They exchanged fire with the troops and attacked them with grenades. Hundreds of local youths also pelted the troops with stones and petrol bombs. Journalist Simon Winchester later wrote:

To anyone who experienced the battle, it was perfectly obvious that hundreds and hundreds of bullets were being fired by both sides – and yet the Army had the gall, when asked by reporters later in the weekend, to say that its soldiers fired only 15 shots in sum. The official figures were to be published later: soldiers in the Falls that weekend fired no less than 1,457 rounds.

The British Army also continued firing CS gas, firing 1,600 canisters in total. Local politicians and priests who were on the streets "complained that every time they got a bad situation cooled down more gas had been plunged in". Slingshots were used to launch heavy CS gas canisters into the area and some went through the roofs of houses. According to the Central Citizens' Defence Committee, even streets where there had been no disorder "received salvo after salvo". The soldiers fired 1,600 canisters and cartridges of CS gas during the operation, which was considered to be excessive in such a small area. Some householders set buckets filled with a mixture of water and vinegar outside their front doors "so that those involved in clashes could wet rags to protect them against the stinging gas". Journalist Peter Taylor described the effect of the CS gas on the densely populated area:

The clouds of choking and suffocating gas drifted up the narrow alleyways and back streets of the warren that is the Lower Falls. The gas got everywhere, in through windows, under doors and into the residents' eyes, noses, throats and lungs.

A soldier later interviewed by Taylor recalled: "The place was still saturated with CS gas. Children were coughing, I remember. I'm talking now about the toddlers, kids of three, four, five. It affected everyone but children especially". There were allegations that some soldiers fired CS gas canisters through the windows of houses while residents were still inside. Hundreds of women and children, along with the sick and elderly, began to leave the area.

The British Army later admitted that there were 58 incidents of looting by its soldiers.

=== Curfew ===
At 10 p.m. on Friday 3 July, four hours after the violence began, Freeland ordered that the area be put under an indefinite curfew and that anyone on the streets be arrested. British soldiers announced the curfew through loudspeakers on the ground and from helicopters flying low over the streets. The boundaries of the official curfew zone were Falls Road in the west and north, Albert Street and Cullingtree Road in the east, and Grosvenor Road in the south. However, during the curfew, the zone was extended in the southwest as far as Dunmore Street. There were about 3,000 homes inside the curfew zone. After the curfew was announced, up to 3,000 soldiers began moving into the curfew zone supported by armoured vehicles and helicopters. They also began sealing off the curfew zone with barbed wire.

Shooting and rioting continued for a number of hours after the curfew began. Minutes after the curfew was announced, three soldiers were shot and wounded by Official IRA volunteers in Omar Street. Troops also reported coming under "heavy and extremely accurate sniper fire" in Plevna Street. Billy McKee, commander of the Provisional IRA's Belfast Brigade, telephoned Jim Sullivan and offered help, but Sullivan rejected the offer. The small Provisional IRA unit in the area decided to engage the troops nevertheless. It consisted of up to 11 volunteers commanded by Charles 'Charlie' Hughes. They fought a gun battle with troops in Cyprus Street before withdrawing. According to Brendan Hughes, the unit ran out of ammunition. Martin Dillon wrote that by withdrawing, they "avoided losing what few weapons they had in a confrontation which could only end in disaster". Outside the curfew zone, Springfield Road Army/RUC base came under sustained attack from missile-throwing crowds. Soldiers pushed them back with CS gas and baton charges, but IRA snipers moved in and kept the base under intermittent fire. The last shots were fired at dawn on Saturday 4 July.

Inside the curfew zone, the British Army began a house-to-house search for weapons, demolished barricades and made arrests. At least 1,000 houses were searched. Any journalists who remained inside the curfew zone were arrested by the British Army. It is claimed that because the media was unable to watch their activities, the soldiers behaved "with reckless abandon". British Army log sheets reveal that the troops were ordered to "be aggressive". Hundreds of houses were forcibly searched and there were scores of complaints of soldiers hitting, threatening, insulting and humiliating residents. Pubs and businesses were also searched and it is claimed that several of them were looted by the soldiers. According to Mallie and Bishop's account: "The soldiers behaved with a new harshness... axeing down doors, ripping up floorboards, disembowelling chairs, sofas, beds, and smashing the garish plaster statues of the Madonna... which adorned the tiny front parlours".

At a Northern Ireland Cabinet meeting on 7 July, it was said that "little structural damage had been reported, apart from the pulling up of floorboards". The ministers concluded that there was a "smear campaign" being mounted against the British Army. The British Minister of State for defence, Lord Balniel, defended the actions of the soldiers: "I am deeply impressed by the impartial way they are carrying out an extremely difficult task".

At 5 pm on Saturday, the Army announced by loudspeaker that people could leave their homes for two hours to get vital supplies. However, nobody was allowed to leave or enter the curfew zone. During this time, the local Member of Parliament, Paddy Devlin, was arrested by the British Army while out talking to his constituents. He claimed that the soldiers responsible threatened to shoot him.

=== End of the curfew ===
Although the area remained sealed off, by midday on Sunday 5 July there was a perception among locals that the operation had been abandoned. According to Hanley and Millar, "the British knew that most of the 'more attractive' armaments had been spirited away 'before the cordon was fully effective'". The curfew was broken on Sunday when 3,000 women and children from the nationalist Andersonstown area marched to the British lines with food and other groceries for the people there. The unprepared soldiers tried to hold back the crowd at first, but eventually allowed it to pass through.

By the time the search was over, the troops had captured about 100 firearms, 100 homemade grenades, 250 pounds of explosives and 21,000 rounds of ammunition. Among the firearms were 52 pistols, 35 rifles, 6 machine guns and 14 shotguns. Almost all of this material belonged to the Official IRA.

It was later reported that while the lower Falls was under curfew and the streets emptied of people, the British Army had driven two Ulster Unionist Party government ministers, John Brooke and William Long, through the area in armoured vehicles. This enraged nationalists, who perceived the gesture as a symbol of unionist triumphalism over an area subdued by British military force.

== Casualties ==
The British Army killed four civilians during the operation:

- Charles O'Neill, a 36-year-old Catholic civilian, died on 3 July after being knocked down by a British Saracen APC on the Falls Road during the initial rioting. According to eyewitnesses, he walked out on to the road and attempted to flag down the APCs, but the lead vehicle sped up and "deliberately" ran him down. One eyewitness said that soldiers prodded O'Neill in the ribs and that one of them remarked: "Move on you Irish bastard – there are not enough of you dead". O'Neill was an invalided ex-serviceman.
- William Burns, a 54-year-old Catholic civilian, was shot dead, at the front door of his home on the Falls Road on 3 July. He had just finished chatting to a neighbour when he was shot in the chest. The shooting took place at about 8:20 pm, almost two hours before the curfew was announced. A pathologist said that the bullet had likely been a ricochet.
- Patrick Elliman, a 62-year-old Catholic civilian, was shot in the head on Marchioness Street on the night of 3 July and died of his wounds on 10 July. He had walked to the end of the street in his night clothes "for a breath of fresh air". Elliman was taken away in an ambulance. However, it was searched and re-routed by the British Army, which meant that it took thirty minutes to reach the Royal Victoria Hospital a few hundred yards away. That night, British soldiers broke into Elliman's home and quartered themselves there for the night.
- Zbigniew Uglik, a 23-year-old of Polish heritage who lived in England, was shot dead at the rear of a house on 4 July. He was an amateur photographer and had been taking photographs of the riots. Uglik was in a house on Albert Street, at the edge of the curfew zone, and decided to fetch another camera from the hotel where he was staying. A British Army sniper shot him as he climbed over the back wall of the house, shortly after midnight.

Another 60 civilians suffered gunshot wounds. Eighteen soldiers were also wounded; twelve by gunshots and six by grenades. A total of 337 people, including Official IRA leader Billy McMillen, were also arrested.

== Results ==
The Falls Curfew was a turning point in the relationship between the British Army and the Irish nationalist/Catholic community. Historian Richard English wrote that it was "arguably decisive in terms of worsening the relationship between the British Army and the Catholic working class". Previously, many of them had seen the British Army as a neutral force in the city that would protect them from the police. However, the events of the Falls Curfew gave credence to the Irish republican argument that the British Army was a hostile colonial army of occupation. According to Sinn Féin's Gerry Adams, "Thousands of people who had never been republicans now gave their active support to the IRA; others, who had never had any time for physical force, now regarded it as a practical necessity".

According to the Provisional IRA's official manual The Green Book, "In September of 1969 the existing conditions dictated that Brits were not to be shot, but after the Falls curfew all Brits were to the people acceptable targets".

Another result of the Falls Curfew was a deepening of the enmity between the two factions of the Irish Republican Army, the 'Official' IRA and the 'Provisional' IRA, who had parted ways in December 1969. The Officials accused the Provisionals of tricking them into a fight they could not win and then leaving them to fight alone, resulting in the loss of much of their weaponry. Over the following year, the two factions carried out many shootings and beatings of each other's members. A truce was eventually agreed between them to prevent further bloodshed after the Officials assassinated a young Provisional named Charlie Hughes. Hughes was the commander of the Provisional's unit in the Lower Falls and had taken part in some of the fighting during the Curfew.

== See also ==
- 1992 Coalisland riots
- 1997 Northern Ireland riots
- Operation Motorman

== Bibliography ==
- Ó Fearghail, Seán Óg (1970). Law (?) and Orders: The Belfast 'Curfew' of 3–5 July 1970. Dundalgan Press.
- Hanley, Brian; Millar, Scott (2009). The Lost Revolution: The Story of the Official IRA and the Workers' Party. Dublin: Penguin Ireland. ISBN 978-1-84488-120-8.
- English, Richard (2003). Armed Struggle: A History of the IRA. London: MacMillan. ISBN 1-4050-0108-9.
- Taylor, Peter (1997). Provos: The IRA and Sinn Féin. London: Bloomsbury. ISBN 0-7475-3392-X.
- Moloney, Ed (2002). The Secret History of the IRA. London: Penguin. ISBN 0-14-101041-X.
- Mallie, Eamonn; Bishop, Patrick (1988). The Provisional IRA. London: Corgi. ISBN 0-552-13337-X.
- CAIN chronology for 1970
- People's Democracy pamphlet
