= Billy McMillen =

Irish republican activist (1927–1975)

- Born: William McMillen; 19 May 1927; Falls Road, Belfast, Northern Ireland
- Died: 28 April 1975 (aged 47); Spinner Street, Belfast, Northern Ireland
- Other name: Liam McMillen
- Organization: Northern Ireland Civil Rights Association
- Political party: Official Sinn Féin (after 1970); Sinn Féin (until 1970)
- Military career
- Paramilitary: Irish Republican Army (1943–1970; Official IRA (1970–1975)
- Rank: Commanding officer
- Unit: Belfast Brigade
- Conflicts: Border Campaign; The Troubles

William McMillen (19 May 1927 – 28 April 1975), aka Liam McMillen, was an Irish republican activist and an officer of the Official Irish Republican Army (OIRA) from Belfast, Northern Ireland. He was killed in 1975, in a feud with the Irish National Liberation Army (INLA).

== Early life and political activity ==
McMillen was born in Belfast in 1927 and joined the IRA at age 16 in 1943. During the IRA's Border Campaign (1956–62), he was interned and held in Crumlin Road jail. In 1964, he ran in the British general election as an Independent Republican candidate. When McMillen placed the Irish tricolour in the window of his election office in the lower Falls area, this sparked a riot between republicans, loyalists and the Royal Ulster Constabulary (RUC). There had been tensions on the issue since the government of Northern Ireland banned the flying of the tricolour under the Flags and Emblems Act.

In October 1964, during the general election campaign, a photo of McMillen was placed in the window of the election office in Divis Street flanked on one side by the Starry Plough flag and on the other by the tricolour. Initially the authorities did not intervene, but they were jolted into action following threats from the Reverend Ian Paisley that if the flag was not removed he and his supporters would march on the office and remove it themselves. On the same night, Wednesday, 28 September 1964, a large force of the RUC armed with rifles, Sten guns, batons and crowbars smashed down the doors of McMillen's election HQ and removed the tricolour. The following day the IRA replaced the flag in the window and police attacked a crowd who had gathered to support McMillen. Rioting ensued. At around this time McMillen succeeded Billy McKee as the Officer commanding (OC) of the Belfast Brigade.

McMillen was keen to work for the unity of Protestant and Catholic workers. Roy Garland recalled that McMillan's grandfather was master of an Orange lodge in Edinburgh and McMillan knew of that heritage and the meaning of the colours of the Irish flag. He prominently displayed in his election offices a verse of a poem by John Frazier, a Presbyterian from Co Offaly: "Till then the Orange lily be your badge my patriot brother. The everlasting green for me and we for one and other."

== Civil rights movement and August 1969 riots ==
In 1967, McMillen was involved in the formation of the Northern Ireland Civil Rights Association and was a member of a three-man committee which drew up the Association's constitution. The NICRA's peaceful activities resulted in violent opposition from many unionists, leading to fears that Catholic areas would come under attack. In May 1969, when asked at an IRA army council meeting by Ruairí Ó Brádaigh how many weapons the Belfast Brigade had for defensive operations, McMillen stated they had only one pistol, a machine gun and some ammunition.

By 14 August 1969, serious rioting had broken out in Belfast and Catholic districts came under attack from both civilian unionists and the RUC. McMillen's IRA command by this point still had only a limited amount of weapons (one rifle, two sub-machine guns and nine handguns according to one account) because the leadership in Dublin were reluctant to release guns. While McMillen was involved in some armed actions on this day, he was widely blamed by those who established the Provisional IRA for the IRA's failure to adequately defend Catholic neighbourhoods from Ulster loyalist attack. He was arrested and temporarily detained by the RUC on the morning of 15 August, but was released shortly afterwards (see also Northern Ireland riots of August 1969).

McMillen's role in the 1969 riots was very important within IRA circles, as it was one of the major factors contributing to the split in the movement in late 1969. In a June 1972 lecture organised by Official Sinn Féin in Dublin, McMillen defended his conduct, stating that by 1969 the total membership of the Belfast IRA was approximately 120 men and their armaments had increased to a grand total of 24 weapons, most of which were short-range pistols.

== Split in the IRA, confrontation with the British Army ==
In September, McMillen called a meeting of IRA commanders in Belfast. Billy McKee and several other republicans arrived at the meeting armed and demanded McMillen's resignation. He refused, but many of those unhappy with his leadership broke away and refused to take orders from McMillen or the Dublin IRA leadership. Most of them joined the Provisional Irish Republican Army, when this group split off from the IRA in December 1969. McMillen himself remained loyal to the IRA's Dublin leadership, which became known as the Official IRA. The split rapidly developed into a bitter rivalry between the two groups. In April 1970, McMillen was shot and wounded by Provisional IRA members in the Lower Falls area of Belfast.

In June 1970, McMillen's Official IRA had their first major confrontation with the British Army, which had been deployed to Belfast in the previous year, in an incident known as the Falls Curfew. The British Army mounted an arms search in the Official IRA stronghold of the Lower Falls, where they were attacked with a grenade by Provisional IRA members. In response, the British flooded the area with troops and declared a curfew. This led to a three-day gun battle between 80 and 90 Official IRA members led by McMillen and up to 3,000 British troops. Five civilians were killed in the fighting and about 60 wounded. In addition 35 rifles, 6 machine guns, 14 shotguns, grenades, explosives and 21,000 rounds of ammunition, all belonging to the OIRA, were seized. McMillen blamed the Provisionals for instigating the incident and then refusing to help the Officials against the British.

This ill-feeling eventually led to an all-out feud between the republican factions in Belfast in March 1971. The Provisionals attempted to kill McMillen again, as well as his second-in-command Jim Sullivan. In retaliation, McMillen had Charlie Hughes, a young PIRA member, killed. Tom Cahill, brother of leading Provisional Joe Cahill, was also shot and wounded. After these deaths, the two IRA factions in Belfast negotiated a ceasefire and directed their attention instead at the British Army.

== OIRA ceasefire ==
When the Northern Ireland authorities introduced internment in August 1971, McMillen fled Belfast for Dundalk in the Republic of Ireland, where he remained for several months. During this time, the Official IRA carried out many attacks on the British Army and other targets in Northern Ireland. However, in April 1972, the organisation in Belfast was badly weakened by the death of their commander in the Markets area, Joe McCann. In May of that year, the Dublin leadership of the OIRA called a ceasefire, a move which McMillen supported. Nevertheless, in the year after the ceasefire, McMillen's command killed seven British soldiers in what they termed "retaliatory attacks". McMillen served on the Ard Chomhairle (leadership council) of Official Sinn Féin.

== INLA split and assassination ==
By 1974, a group of OIRA members around Seamus Costello were unhappy with the ceasefire. In December 1974, they broke away from the Official movement, forming the Irish Republican Socialist Party and the Irish National Liberation Army. Some OIRA members under McMillen's command, including the entire Divis Flats unit, defected to the new grouping. This provoked another intra-republican feud in Belfast. The feud began with arms raids on OIRA dumps and beatings of their members by the INLA. McMillen, in response was accused of drawing up a "death list" of IRSP/INLA members and even of handing information on them over to the loyalist Ulster Volunteer Force.

The first killing came on 20 February 1975, when the OIRA shot dead an INLA member named Hugh Ferguson in west Belfast. A spate of shootings followed on both sides.

On 28 April 1975, McMillen was shot dead by INLA member Gerard Steenson, as he was shopping in a hardware shop on Spinner Street with his wife Mary. McMillen was hit in the neck and died on the scene. His killing was unauthorised and was condemned by INLA/IRSP leader Seamus Costello. Despite this, the OIRA tried to kill Costello on 9 May 1975 and eventually killed him two years later. McMillen's death was a major blow to the OIRA in Belfast.

== Sources ==
- The Lost Revolution: The Story of the Official IRA and the Workers' Party, Brian Hanley and Scott Millar, ISBN 1-84488-120-2
- Éamon Mallie, Patrick Bishop, The Provisional IRA
- Jack Holland, Henry McDonald, INLA: Deadly Divisions, Poolbeg, ISBN 9781842234389
