= Springhill massacre =

1972 incident in Belfast, Northern Ireland

- Part of the Troubles
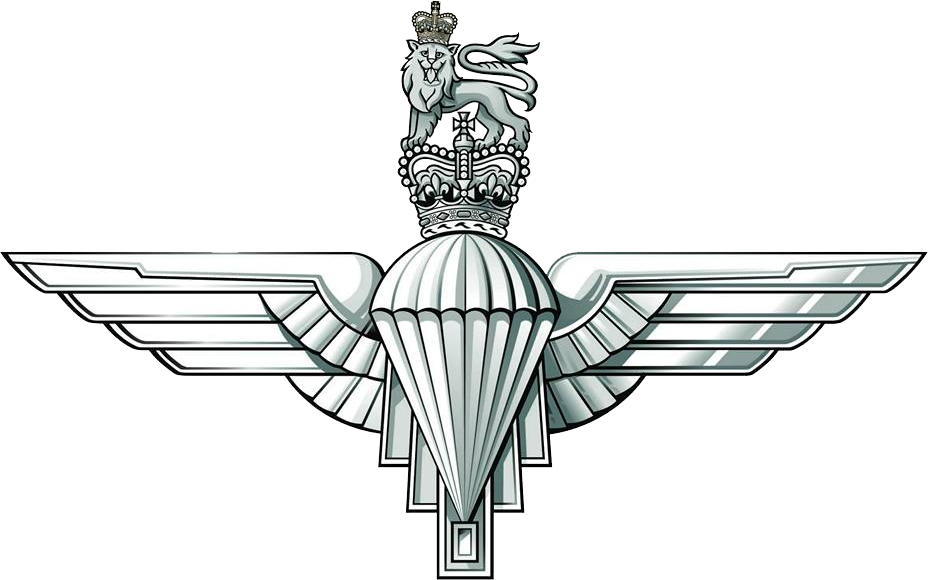
- Logo of the Parachute Regiment
- Location: 54.5975°N 5.9796°W; Belfast, Northern Ireland
- Date: 9 July 1972
- Attack type: Mass shooting
- Deaths: 5
- Injuries: 2
- Perpetrator: British Army snipers from the Parachute Regiment

The Springhill massacre was an incident in which five Catholic residents were killed by the British Army in the Springhill estate in West Belfast, Northern Ireland, on 9 July 1972, during the Troubles. Three of the victims were teenagers, including a 13-year-old girl, and another was a Catholic priest waving a white flag as he went to attend one of the injured.

== Background ==
Civil sectarian conflict, caused by ethno-nationalist divisions, civil rights grievances, and revolutionary Marxist politics, augmented with escalating violence between paramilitary factions and the Royal Ulster Constabulary and the British Army, had been ongoing in Northern Ireland since 1969, with several hundred people having been killed or injured. The area of West Belfast was particularly stricken with violent confrontations between elements of the Irish nationalist community and the police and military forces of the British State. West Belfast was increasingly a problem area for the police and the army given the open hostility of the population towards their presence, and activity from Irish Republican paramilitary forces in the neighbourhood, with the Provisional Irish Republican Army becoming increasingly aggressive in its attacks at the time that the Springhill shooting incident occurred.

== Shooting ==
=== Provisional IRA version ===
According to a Provisional Irish Republican Army (IRA) statement, on 10 July 1972, British Army snipers from the Parachute Regiment took up a position in Corry's timber yard at Springhill, West Belfast, and were seen to be reinforcing it with sandbags. Two cars subsequently drove into the vicinity, and the British Army detachment were observed to open fire upon them, firing two shots at the vehicles. One of the cars drove away at speed, whilst the other one drove a short distance and then stopped, the occupants getting out. On the occupants exiting the vehicle, the British Army post opened fire upon them. One of the stopped car's occupants was hit by a bullet in the head and fell seriously wounded. A local resident, Brian Petticrew, seeing the nearby incident, ran over to help the wounded man, but was also fired upon, and hit in the back and the arm. Then this man's brother and a friend ran to the downed occupant, but both were also wounded by gunfire in the process.

At some point during the incident, a 13-year-old girl, Margaret Gargan, was fatally shot. A parish priest, Father Noel Fitzpatrick, and Patrick Butler, a passer-by, both ran to her assistance. Fitzpatrick was reportedly seen to be waving a white cloth above his head to display himself as a non-combatant, but they were also fired upon and killed. All of the victims were unarmed.

=== British Army statement ===
The British Army disputed the IRA statement of the events, claiming that its troops were fired upon first by Provisional Irish Republican Army gunmen, ending a temporary ceasefire in the West Belfast area at that time. A British Army spokesman stated: "There had been a heavy exchange of fire between the IRA and troops, some of the dead and wounded were undoubtedly caught in a crossfire". The next day, 10 July 1972, the British Army stated that gunmen at the scene had been engaged and killed in the crossfire with its detachment. Two of the five dead at the scene, John Dougal (16) and David McCafferty (15), were reported to be members of the Provisional Irish Republican Army's Youth Wing, Fianna Éireann.

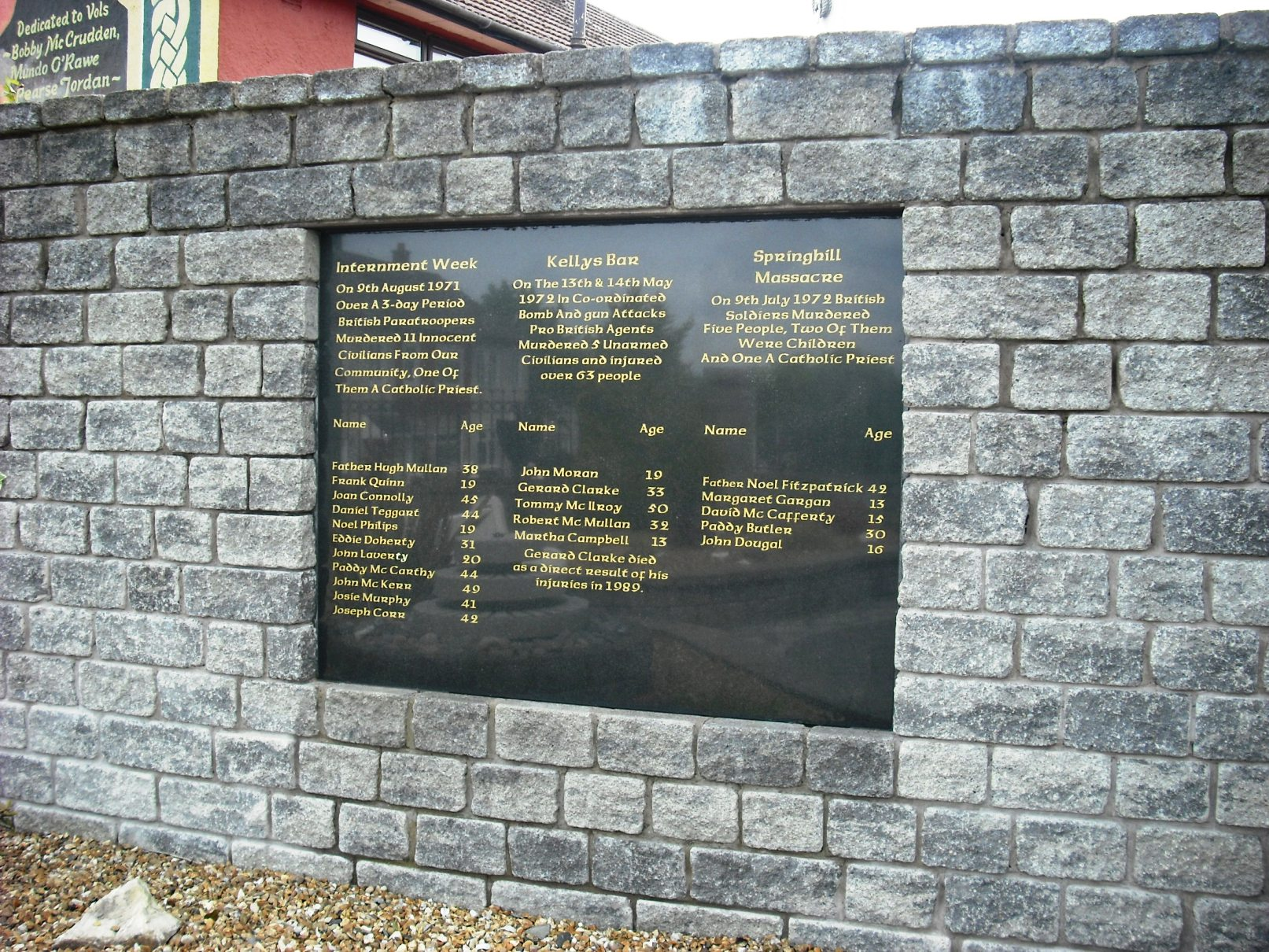
The dead commemorated in a republican garden of Remembrance in Ballymurphy, Belfast

== Aftermath ==
An inquest into the five deaths was held in 1973, with the coroner returning an open verdict. The event has since sometimes been called "the forgotten massacre", because it has been overshadowed by the Bloody Sunday mass shooting in Derry just a few months earlier, in which British soldiers shot 26 unarmed Catholic civilians, only half of whom survived; and the even closer-by Ballymurphy massacre the prior year, in which members of the same battalion killed 11 civilians over three days.

During the several decades since the Springhill massacre, there has been intermittent pressure-group campaigning by relatives of the casualties, seeking a new legal inquiry into the event. In 2014, the Attorney General for Northern Ireland, John Larkin QC, announced that new inquests have been scheduled into the deaths that occurred in the Springhill incident.

In June 2026, the British prime minister apologised for the massacre, describing the soldiers as having "lost control".

There are two memorials for the slain, both in Ballymurphy, Belfast: Springhill Massacre Memorial Garden (dedicated on 4 May 1999), and Ballymurphy Gairdin Cuimhneachain (completed 27 November 2005 and a memorial also to other area residents killed by the British Army and Loyalist paramilitary groups).
