= Battle at Springmartin =

1972 gun battles in Belfast, Northern Ireland

- Part of the Troubles and Operation Banner
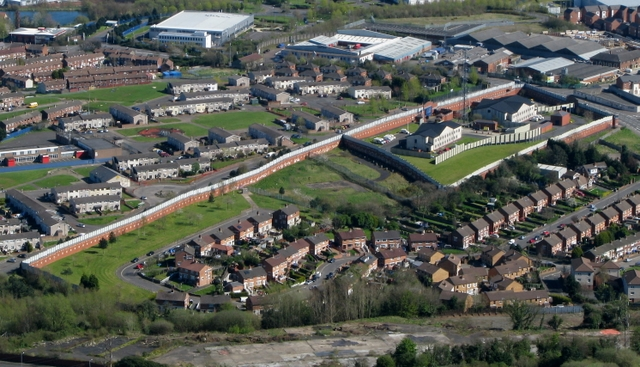
- The interface area today. At the far end of the 18-foot (5.5 m) high peace wall is the former British Army base. The area has been extensively rebuilt since 1972.
Date	13–14 May 1972
Location	Interface area between Springmartin and Ballymurphy housing estates, Belfast, Northern Ireland 54°35′41″N 5°59′14″W
Result	7 dead (including 5 civilians), at least 66 injured

Belligerents
British Army	Provisional IRA; Official IRA	Ulster Volunteer Force

Strength
2 regiments	Unknown	Unknown

Casualties and losses
1 killed 1 wounded	1 killed Unknown wounded	1+ wounded 2 arrested

The Battle at Springmartin was a series of gun battles in Belfast, Northern Ireland on 13–14 May 1972, as part of The Troubles. It involved the British Army, the Provisional Irish Republican Army, the Official Irish Republican Army, and the Ulster Volunteer Force (UVF).

The violence began when a car bomb, planted by Ulster loyalists, exploded outside a crowded pub in the mainly Irish nationalist and Catholic district of Ballymurphy. UVF snipers then opened fire on the survivors from an abandoned high-rise flat. This began the worst fighting in Northern Ireland since the suspension of the Parliament of Northern Ireland and the imposition of direct rule from London. For the rest of the night and throughout the next day, local IRA units fought gun battles with both the UVF and British Army. Most of the fighting took place along the interface between the Catholic Ballymurphy and Ulster Protestant Springmartin housing estates, and the British Army base that sat between them.

Seven people were killed in the violence: five civilians (four Catholics, one Protestant), a British soldier and a member of Fianna Éireann. Four of the dead were teenagers.

== Bombing of Kelly's Bar ==
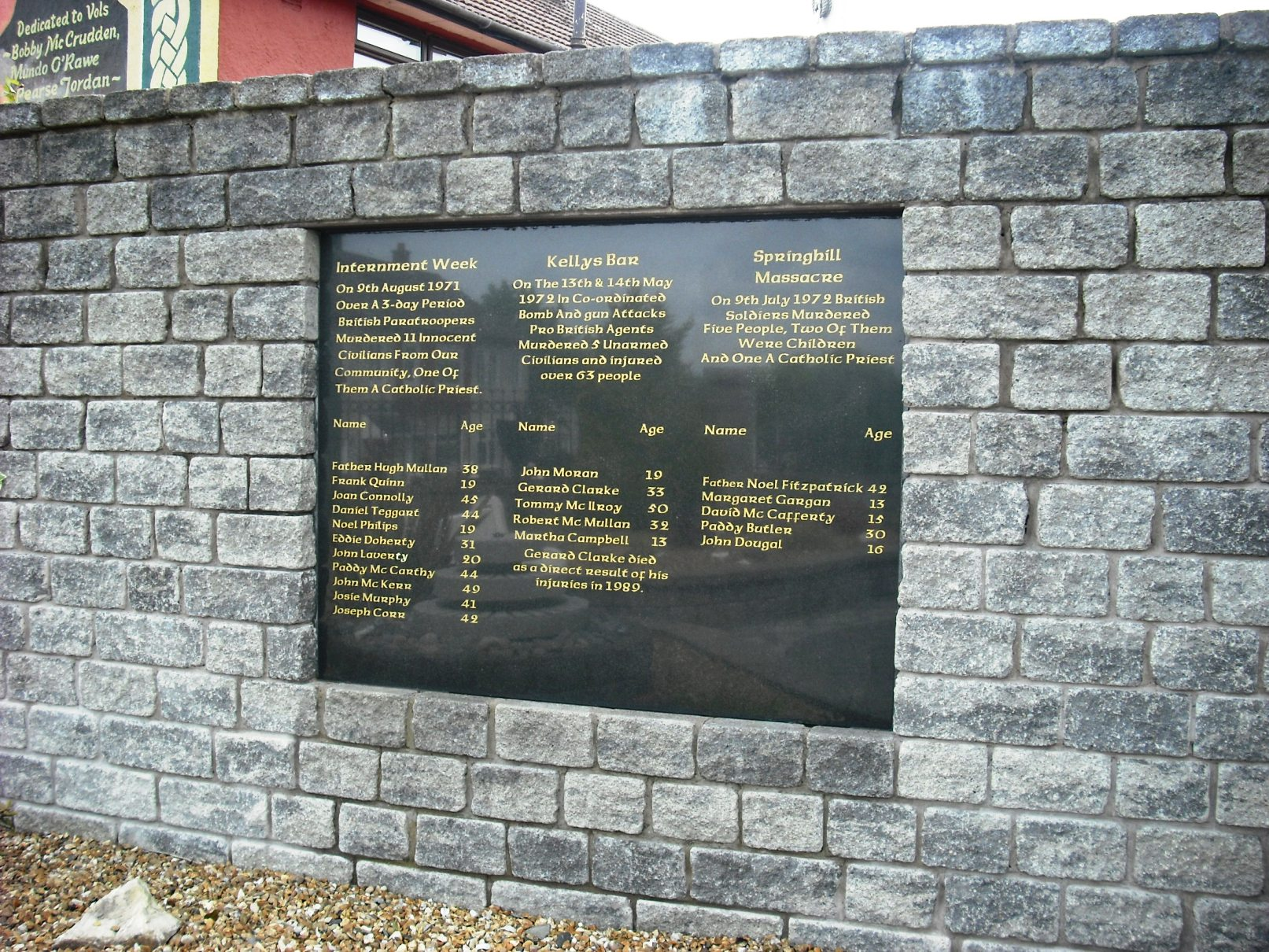
The dead commemorated in a republican Garden of Remembrance in Ballymurphy, Belfast

Shortly after 5:00 PM on Saturday 13 May 1972, a car bomb exploded without warning outside Kelly's Bar, at the junction of the Springfield Road and Whiterock Road. The pub was in a mainly Irish Catholic and nationalist area and most of its customers were from the area. At the time of the blast, the pub was crowded with men watching an association football match between England and West Germany on colour television. Sixty-three people were injured, eight of them seriously. John Moran (19), who had been working at Kelly's as a part-time barman, died of his injuries on 23 May.

At first, the British Army claimed that the blast had been an "accident" caused by a Provisional IRA bomb. The Secretary of State for Northern Ireland, William Whitelaw, told the House of Commons on 18 May that the blast was caused by a Provisional IRA bomb that exploded prematurely. However, locals suspected that the loyalist Ulster Defence Association (UDA) had planted the bomb. Republican sources said that IRA volunteers would not have risked storing such a large amount of explosives in such a crowded pub. It later emerged that the bomb had indeed been planted by loyalists.

A memorial plaque on the site of the former pub names three members of staff who lost their lives as a result of the bomb and the gun battles that followed. It reads: "...here on 13th May 1972 a no warning Loyalist car bomb exploded. As a result, 66 people were injured and three innocent members of staff of Kelly's Bar lost their lives. They were: Tommy McIlroy (died 13th May 1972), John Moran (died from his injuries 23rd May 1972), Gerard Clarke (died from his injuries 6th September 1989)."

== The gun battles ==
=== Saturday 13 May ===
The night before the bombing, gunmen from the UVF West Belfast Brigade had taken up position along the second floor of an abandoned row of maisonettes (or flats) at the edge of the Protestant Springmartin estate. The flats overlooked the Catholic Ballymurphy estate. Rifles, mostly Second World War stock, were ferried to the area from dumps in the Shankill.

Not long after the explosion, the UVF unit opened fire on those gathered outside the wrecked pub, including those who had been caught in the blast. A British Army spokesman said that the shooting began at about 5:35 PM, when 30 high-velocity shots were heard. Social Democratic and Labour Party Member of Parliament Gerry Fitt said that shots had been fired from the Springmartin estate only minutes after the bombing. William Whitelaw, however, claimed that the shooting did not begin until 40 minutes after the blast. Ambulances braved the gunfire to reach the wounded, which included a number of children. Tommy McIlroy (50), a Catholic civilian who worked at Kelly's Bar, was shot in the chest and killed outright. He was the first to be killed in the violence.

Members of both the Provisional and Official wings of the IRA "joined forces to return the fire", using Thompson submachine guns, M1 carbines and a Bren light machine gun. When British troops arrived on the scene, they too were fired upon by IRA units. Corporal Alan Buckley (22) of the 1st Battalion, The Kings Regiment was fatally shot by the Provisionals on Whiterock Road. A platoon of soldiers then gave covering fire while a medical officer tried to help him. Another soldier was also wounded in the gunfight. Following this, 300 members of the Parachute Regiment were sent to back up the King's Own Scottish Borderers.

Over the next few hours there were 35 separate shooting incidents reported, making it the most violent night since the suspension of the Northern Ireland government and imposition of Direct Rule from London earlier that year. The IRA exchanged fire with both the British Army and with the UVF snipers on the Springmartin flats. Most of the IRA's fire was aimed at the Henry Taggart Army base—near the Springmartin flats—which was hit by over 400 rounds in the first 14 hours of the battle. Although most of the republican gunfire came from the Ballymurphy estate, British soldiers also reported shots being fired from the nearby mountain slopes. According to journalist Malachi O'Doherty, a source claimed that the British Army had also fired into Belfast City Cemetery between the Whiterock and Springfield roads.

Two more people were killed that night. The first was 15-year-old Michael Magee, a member of Fianna Éireann (the IRA youth wing), who was found shot in the chest at New Barnsley Crescent, near his home. He died shortly after he was brought to the Royal Victoria Hospital. Two men who took him there claimed they were beaten by British soldiers who had just heard of Corporal Buckley's death. A death notice said that Magee was killed by the British Army but the republican publication Belfast Graves claimed he had been accidentally shot. The other was a Catholic civilian, Robert McMullan (32), who was shot at New Barnsley Park, also near his home. Witnesses said there was heavy gunfire in the area at 8PM and then "a single shot rang out and Robert McMullan fell to the ground". It is thought that he was shot by soldiers firing from Henry Taggart base.

On the first night of the battle, the Royal Ulster Constabulary (RUC) arrested two young UVF members, Trevor King and William Graham. They were found at a house in Blackmountain Pass trying to fix a rifle that had jammed. During a search of the house, the RUC found three Steyr rifles, ammunition and illuminating flares.

=== Sunday 14 May ===
The fighting between the IRA, UVF and British Army resumed the following day. According to the book UVF (1997), British soldiers were moved into the ground floor of the abandoned flats while the UVF snipers continued firing from the flats above them. The soldiers and UVF were both firing into Ballymurphy, and according to the book both were "initially unaware of each other". However, according to a UVF gunman involved in the battle, there was collusion between the UVF and British soldiers. He alleged that a British foot patrol caught a UVF unit hiding guns in a bin but ignored their cache with a wink when the UVF member said the guns were "rubbish". According to Jim Cusack and Henry McDonald, Jim Hanna – who later became UVF Chief of Staff – was one of the snipers operating from Springmartin during the battle. Jim Hanna told journalist Kevin Myers that, during the clashes, a British Army patrol helped Hanna and two other UVF members get into Corry's Timber Yard, which overlooked the Catholic Ballymurphy estate. When a British Army Major heard of the incident he ordered his men to withdraw, but they did not arrest the UVF members, who were allowed to hold their position. The IRA's Ballymurphy unit was returning fire at an equal rate and some 400 strike marks were later counted on the flats.

In the Springmartin estate, gunfire killed Protestant teenager John Pedlow (17) and wounded his friend. According to the book Lost Lives, they had been shot by soldiers. His friend said that they had been walking home from a shop when there was a burst of gunfire, which "came from near the Taggart Memorial Army post and seemed to be directed towards Black Mountain Parade". However, Malcolm Sutton's Index of Deaths from the Conflict in Ireland states that he was killed by the IRA. An inquest into Pedlow's death found that he had been hit by a .303 bullet, which was likely a ricochet. Pedlow was given a loyalist funeral, but police said there was nothing to link him with any "illegal organisation or acts".

UVF snipers continued to fire from the high-rise flats on the hill at Springmartin Road. About three hours after the shooting of Pedlow, a bullet fatally struck a 13-year-old Catholic girl, Martha Campbell, as she walked along Springhill Avenue. She was among a group of young girls and a witness said the firing must have been directed at himself and the girls, as nobody else was in the area at the time. Reliable loyalist sources say that the schoolgirl was shot by the UVF.

Shortly afterwards, the loyalist UDA used roadblocks and barricades to seal-off the Woodvale area into a "no-go" zone, controlled by the UDA's B Company, which was then commanded by former British soldier Davy Fogel.

== See also ==
- Chronology of Provisional Irish Republican Army actions (1970–1979)
- Timeline of Ulster Volunteer Force actions
