= 1982 Divis Flats bombing =

Bombing in Northern Ireland

Coordinates: 54.6000°N 5.9422°W

- Part of "the Troubles"
- Location: Cullingtree Walk, Divis Tower, Belfast, Northern Ireland
- Date: 16 September 1982 (GMT)
- Target: British Army foot patrol
- Attack type: Bombing
- Weapon: remote control bomb
- Deaths: 1 British soldier 2 civilians
- Injuries: 4
- Perpetrator: Irish National Liberation Army Belfast Brigade

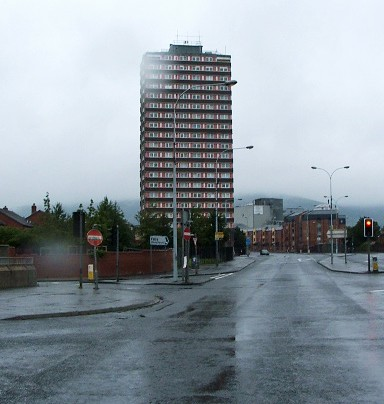
Divis Tower, Belfast in 2004

On Thursday 16 September 1982, the Irish Republican and Revolutionary Socialist paramilitary organization the Irish National Liberation Army (INLA) exploded a bomb hidden in a drainpipe along a balcony in Cullingtree Walk, Divis Tower, Belfast. The explosive device was detonated as a British Army patrol was attacked by a "stone-throwing mob" as they walked along a balcony at Cullingtree Walk. The blast killed three people, a British Army soldier named Kevin Waller (20), and two Catholic civilian passers-by, both of whom were children, they were Stephen Bennet (14) and Kevin Valliday (12). Four other people were injured in the explosion, including another British soldier and three civilians. An INLA member detonated the bomb using a remote control from ground level, where they couldn't see who was on the balcony. There was anger from the Irish Nationalist community directed towards the INLA over the deaths of the two young civilians. 1982 was the INLA's most active year of The Troubles and they killed more British security forces in 1982 than in any other year of the conflict. In December 1982 they carried out the Droppin Well bombing which killed 17 people including 11 off-duty British soldiers, making it the group's deadliest attack against the British Army. INLA Volunteer Martin McElkerney was sentenced to life for the Divis bombing in 1987, but he was released in 1999 under the Good Friday Agreement. In May 2019 McElkerney was found shot, with a handgun nearby, after making a number of concerning phone calls. He later died in hospital.

== See also ==
- Central Bar bombing
- Darkley killings
- Droppin Well bombing
- Timeline of Irish National Liberation Army actions

== Sources ==
- Jack Holland, Henry McDonald (1994) INLA – Deadly Divisions
- CAIN project
