= Irish National Liberation Army Belfast Brigade =

Irish republican and socialist paramilitary in Belfast 1974-1998

INLA Belfast Brigade
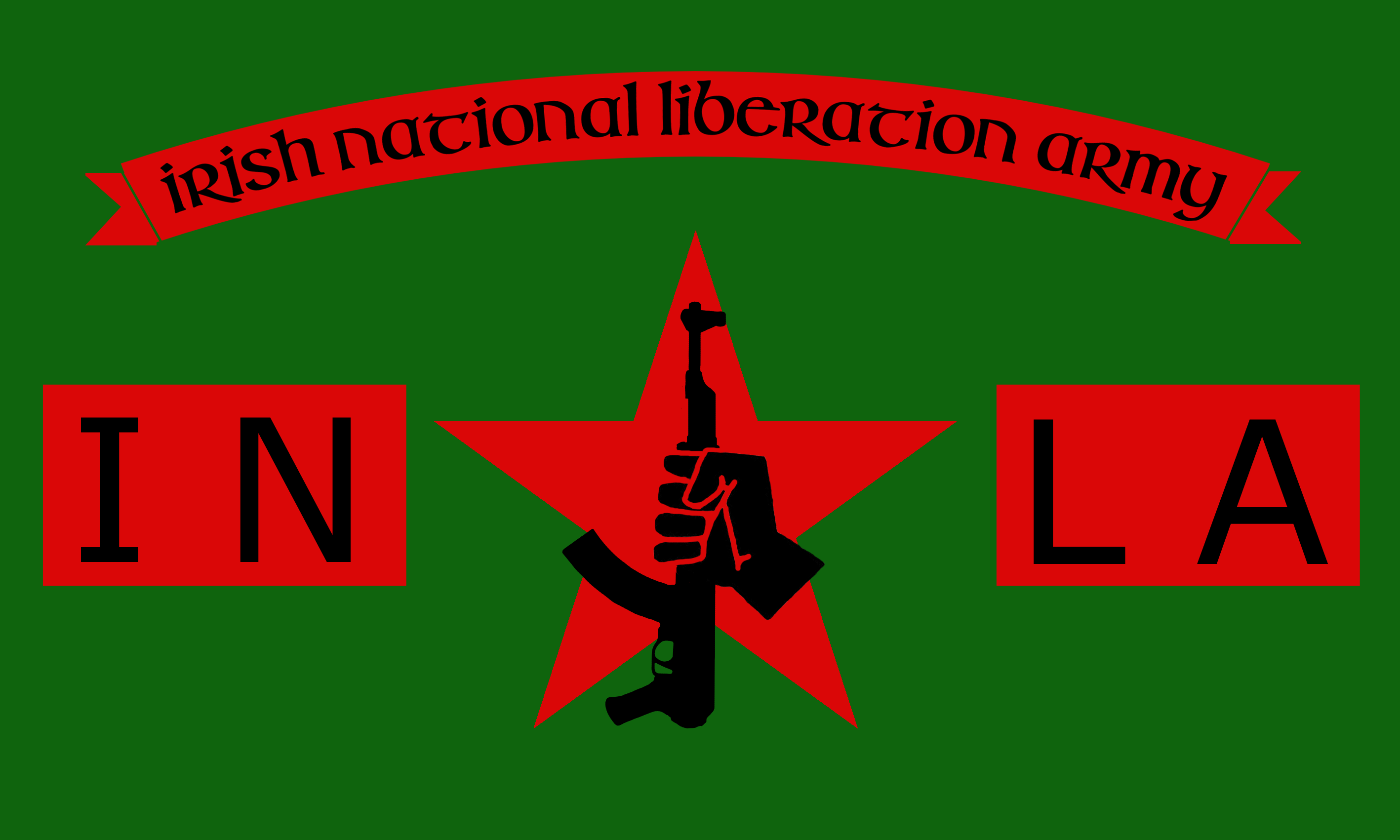
- The Irish National Liberation Army brigades banner
- Active: December 1974 – August 1998
- Allegiance: Irish National Liberation Army; Irish Republican Socialist Party; Irish Republican Socialist Movement
- Size: 250–300 between 1974–1998, about 30–50 at any one time
- Headquarters HQ: Divis Flats, Belfast, Northern Ireland
- Nickname: Erps
- Motto: Saoirse Go Deo (Freedom Forever)
- Main actions: Divis Flats bombing 1982; 1994 Shankill Road killings; 1997 Northern Ireland riots

Commanders
- Notable commanders: Ronnie Bunting; Gerard Steenson; Hugh Torney; Gino Gallagher; Tom McCartan; Paul "Bonanza" McCann (Staff Officer); Kevin Holland

The Irish National Liberation Army Belfast Brigade was the main brigade area of the Irish National Liberation Army (INLA). The other Brigade areas were in Derry which was split between two battalions, the first in Derry City, and the second battalion in south County Londonderry, and County Armagh which was also split into two battalions, a south Armagh and a north Armagh battalion, with smaller units in Newry, east and west County Tyrone and south County Fermanagh.

== Formation ==
The Irish National Liberation Army Belfast Brigade or simply INLA Belfast Brigade was a unit of the Irish Republican and Socialist Paramilitary organization the Irish National Liberation Army (INLA) that was based in Belfast. Along with the INLA's Derry and Armagh brigades the Belfast INLA was one of the most active in the organization during its 24 year paramilitary campaign. It was formed in 1975, a few months after the Irish National Liberation Army and the groups political wing the Irish Republican Socialist Party (IRSP) were themselves formed in Dublin in 1974 by the groups' leader Seamus Costello and his supporters. The INLA and IRSP were formed when Volunteers in the Official IRA (OIRA) left that group as they were frustrated with the progress it was making and the OIRA's 1972 ceasefire. In a 1975 interview for the IRSP's first edition of their newspaper called The Starry Plough, Seamus Costello claimed that in Belfast 200 members had left the Official Republican movement to join the new IRSP movement.

== Activity and actions ==
The INLA Belfast Brigade's first actions were feuding with the Official IRA. Dissenters had left the group early in 1974 led by Paul Tinnelly, who formed the short-lived Tinnelly Brigade, and the OIRA moved quickly to crush that group and met little resistance.

The OIRA hoped to do the same with the newly formed INLA which used the cover name People's Liberation Army (PLA) in its first few months. The OIRA met more stronger resistance from the INLA than they did with any other dissenters, this was mainly due to the support Costello had & how highly regarded he was among his followers & the size of the INLA. Most of the OIRA/INLA feud was played out in Belfast. Six people were killed in the feud and several others were injured, mainly from the OIRA. The highest-profile victim of the feud was Official IRA Belfast Brigade OC Billy McMillen who was rumored to have been killed by Gerard Steenson and Brendan McNamee (a former Provisional IRA volunteer) at Dunlewy Street near the Falls Road. INLA Volunteers also tried to kill an Official IRA member and a veteran Republican Sean Garland. He was seriously injured in an INLA attack in Dublin on 13 March 1975 by Volunteers from the INLA Belfast Brigade. The attacks on McMillen and Garland were not sanctioned by the INLA Army Council and INLA Chief of Staff Seamus Costello was reportedly furious when he heard the news of the attacks. The Belfast Brigade staff believed that since it was the one directly under attack from the OIRA that it should decide when and whom to attack, not the INLA leadership which was based in Dublin and not under threat from the feud. McNamee who helped kill McMillen was himself shot dead soon after by the OIRA in Suffolk, Belfast. The feud between the OIRA and INLA ended soon after this killing when a truce was agreed upon. The INLA would be involved in two more feuds during its 24-year armed campaign, against the IPLO in 1986/87 and an internal feud in 1996, both of these feuds were also mainly played out in Belfast as well.

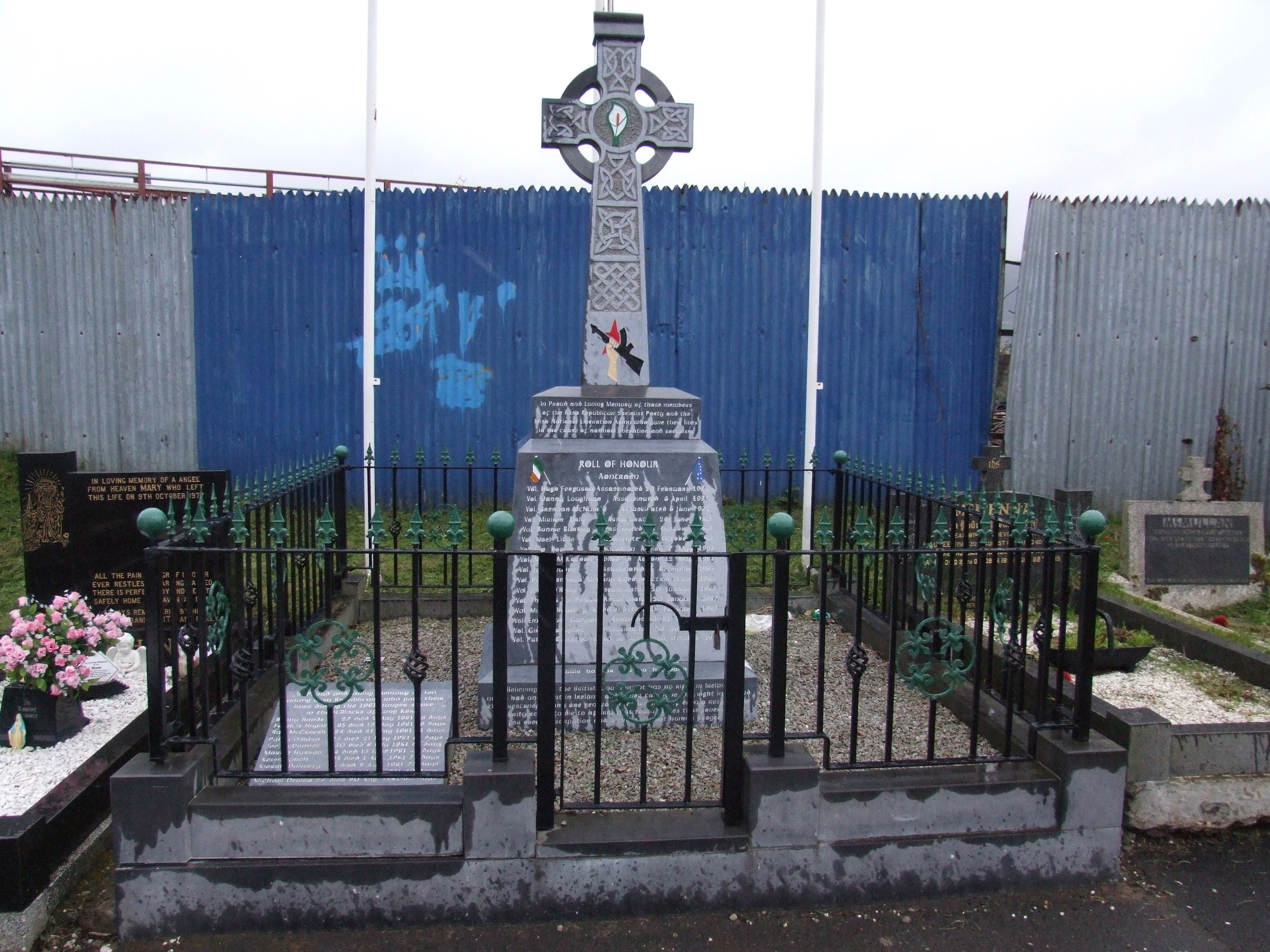
IRSP/INLA Plot in Milltown Cemetery, West Belfast,

The brigade's first action against a member of the British security forces occurred on the 9 August 1975 when Belfast INLA units injured two soldiers from the British Army: the first attack in Ballymurphy a sniper shot a soldier in the neck and the second along the Lower Falls a soldier suffered a serious head injury. There was an attack on soldiers in Divis Flats as well but the unit claimed no hits. It wasn't until a year later that the brigade killed a member of the British Army in the Turf Lodge area of Belfast, when a sniper shot dead private Andrew Crocker who was shot in the neck and died the next day. In September 1976 however the INLA was accused of a double sectarian murder when Volunteers from the Belfast brigade shot dead two Protestant civilians at their home in Ormonde Park, Finaghy. The INLA claimed it was a case of mistaken identity.

In the late 1970s and early 1980s, the INLA developed into a modestly large urban guerrilla organisation in Northern Ireland, operating primarily from the Divis Flats complex in west Belfast, which, as a result, became colloquially known as "the planet of the Irps" (a reference to the IRSP and the film Planet of the Apes). The brigade went through a number of leaders in its first year but its first full-time Officer commanding (OC) was Ronnie Bunting whose father was Ulster Loyalist politician and British Army Major Ronald Bunting who was a follower of Ian Paisley. The Belfast INLA was the most active operational area of the INLA, and their capabilities were enhanced after obtaining a number of AK47s from the Middle East via a connection with the Palestine Liberation Organization (PLO) in 1978. which were first used by the Belfast INLA in August 1978, injuring a number of British soldiers. After Bunting was shot dead along with an IRSP member by the UDA in 1980, Gerard Steenson became OC of the INLA in Belfast. Steenson became the brigades Operations Officer in 1980 & was OC from 1981 - 1983. Around the same time period Jimmy Brown (Irish republican) became the brigades Intelligence officer (I/O), Thomas "Ta" Power, Hugh Torney Martin "Rook" O'Prey & future supergrass Harry Kirkpatrick was also highly active in the brigade during the early 1980s. This was the most active period in the INLA's history. Both Steenson & Brown would later go on to form the IPLO & attack their former comrades in the INLA. In September 1982 an INLA unit detonated a bomb in Divis Flats aimed at killing British soldiers but instead killed two young local boys aged 14 & 12 and a British soldier. This bombing prompted an angry response from residents of the Divis Flats, and about 200 women held a protest march at the IRSP's offices on the Falls Road. Eleven days after the Divis Flats bombing an INLA unit carried out another bomb attack against the British Army in west Belfast, this time killing a British soldier with a booby-trapped bomb attached to a security gate. After this attack the INLA warned that it would increase its bombing attacks on British security forces.

On 15 June 1984 Paul "Bonanza" McCann, one of the INLA's most active members in Belfast, a Staff Officer and an opponent of Tom McCartan's leadership, was surrounded by an RUC unit in a Lenadoon flat in west Belfast along with three other INLA volunteers, one of whom was future INLA leader Gino Gallagher. McCann was armed with an AK47 that he stole from an OIRA arms dump. Three of the INLA volunteers, including Gallagher gave themselves up, as three RUC officers tried to enter the flat McCann hit them with a burst of automatic fire, badly injuring two & killing a third RUC man Michael Todd (22), McCann was also dead hit by a ricocheting bullet from his AK47. The INLA paid tribute to McCann saying he was "one of the finest soldiers ever to fight for national liberation & socialism". McCann was the brother of Sinn Féin councillor Francis McCann. At Paul "Bonanza" McCann's funeral, his coffin was carried by then Sinn Féin President Gerry Adams. & INLA unit (2 men & a woman) fired a volley of shots over his coffin. The INLA Belfast lost direction in the mid '80s and a feud with the newly created Irish People's Liberation Organisation (IPLO) weakened the group further. The IPLO was formed by former INLA members Gerard Steenson and the new group's leader Jimmy Brown. Hugh Torney became OC of the INLA in Belfast during the feud, narrowly surviving an ambush ordered by Steenson in which senior INLA men John O'Reilly and Thomas 'Ta' Power were killed. A few months later Torney was responsible for an ambush in Belfast which resulted in the death of Steenson along with another IPLO member.

During the late 1980s to the early 1990s, the INLA barely existed as a coherent paramilitary force. It wasn't until the early-mid 90s that the Belfast INLA began carrying out paramilitary attacks again. It is believed Gino Gallagher was in charge of the brigade staff during this period. In 1992 the INLA shot and seriously wounded several Protestant civilians in Belfast, usually claiming afterwards they were loyalists. In January 1993 the brigade shot and seriously injured leading UVF member John "Bunter" Graham at his house on the Shankill Road. Later that same month the brigade shot dead a Protestant civilian in what the INLA claimed was a case of mistaken identity. Throughout 1992 and 1993 the INLA was responsible for sporadic gun attacks on British security forces in Belfast, injuring an RUC officer in August 1993 after INLA members opened fire from a hijacked vehicle at Grosvenor Road RUC station. In June 1993 the INLA shot dead a former RUC officer in a hotel in Belfast. On at least two occasions the INLA also tried to kill off-duty members of the Royal Irish Regiment, although the RUC denied one man left with serious injuries after an attack at his home in Dunmurray was a member of the regiment. In September and October 1993 as loyalist paramilitary attacks on the nationalist community intensified the INLA made several attempts to assassinate senior members of the UDA, including Johnny Adair; three INLA gunmen were intercepted and arrested by the RUC near his home in the Shankill area of Belfast.

In February 1994 the INLA shot dead a Protestant doorman Jack Smyth, at the entrance to Bob Cratchits Bar, Lisburn Road, Belfast. The INLA claimed he was linked to the UDA/UFF, but this was denied. In April 1994 the INLA shot dead a member of the UDA, Gerald Evans, at his fishing tackle shop in Glengormley, County Antrim. Six days later the INLA shot dead a civilian, Thomas Douglas, outside his workplace, Northern Ireland Electricity Headquarters, Stranmillis Road, Belfast. The INLA claimed he was a high-ranking loyalist but CAIN lists Douglas as a civilian. The INLA's deadliest attack of the 1990s was the 1994 Shankill Road Killings when Volunteers shot dead three UVF members on the Shankill road including leading UVF man Trevor King. It was alleged that Gino Gallagher carried out the ambush on the orders of Hugh Torney.

Another internal INLA feud broke out in 1996. Both Hugh Torney and Gino Gallagher claimed to be the legitimate leaders of the INLA. The Torney faction was known as INLA-GHQ and the Gallagher faction as the INLA Army Council. During 1996 the feud claimed the lives of six people, including a nine-year-old girl who was shot by mistake by the Army Council faction in north Belfast. The first victim in the feud was Gino Gallagher who was shot dead in a Social Security Office on the Falls Road in January. The last victim was Hugh Torney shot dead in Lurgan on the 3 September 1996, this killing brought the feud to an end and the Torney GHQ faction disbanded on the 9 September 1996.

Around this time the INLA adopted a "no first strike" policy. This meant in theory that the INLA would not attack anybody unless they were attacked first in which case the INLA would hit back to defend itself from a threat. It claimed it was now only involved in a defensive campaign and to defend Nationalists from loyalist attacks.

In 1997 the INLA Belfast Brigade became active once again. In May of that year, they shot dead an off-duty RUC officer Darren Bradshaw as he drank in a gay bar in Belfast's Docks area. During the large-scale rioting in Nationalist areas of Northern Ireland following the 1997 Drumcree march an INLA unit opened fire on British soldiers on patrol in Ardoyne, north Belfast. On 25 September 1997 two INLA units one in south Belfast and the other in west Belfast threw grenades at RUC stations, both of the devices failed to explode. On 27 December 1997 in one of the INLA's most infamous actions, INLA Belfast man Christopher "Crip" McWilliams shot dead Billy Wright the leader of the loyalist paramilitary the Loyalist Volunteer Force (LVF) inside the Maze prison while Wright was being transferred to another part of the prison in a van. In January 1998 the INLA Belfast Brigade shot dead UDA leader Jim Guiney in his carpet shop in Dunmurry. The INLA said the killing was in revenge for the recent killings of Irish Nationalists killed by loyalists. In April the INLA shot dead one of their own Volunteers and father of five Mark McNeill. It is not clear why the killing occurred but it was speculated that the killing was a "grudge killing" or that it might have been a drug related killing. In its last action before they called a ceasefire the INLA Belfast Brigade on 13 July 1998 left two incendiary devices in the Ballynafeigh Orange Hall in which the British security services carried out controlled explosions on the suspect devices. A month later on 24 August 1998 the INLA announced a ceasefire.

== See also ==
- Provisional IRA Belfast Brigade
- Official IRA Belfast Brigade
- UDA West Belfast Brigade

== Sources ==
- Jack Holland (writer), Henry McDonald (writer) (1994) INLA – Deadly Divisions
- Aaron Edwards - UVF: Behind The Mask - Foreword by Martin Dillon
