= Hugh Torney =

Hugh Torney may refer to:

- Hugh Torney (footballer) (1909–2000), Australian rules footballer
- Hugh Torney (Irish republican) (1954–1996), Irish National Liberation Army (INLA) paramilitary leader
