= Brian Robinson (loyalist) =

British loyalist (c. 1962–1989)

Brian Robinson (c. 1962 – 2 September 1989) was a loyalist militant from Belfast, Northern Ireland and member of the Ulster Volunteer Force (UVF) who was witnessed killing a Catholic civilian. His death at the hands of an undercover British Army unit is one of the few from the alleged shoot-to-kill policy in Northern Ireland to have involved a loyalist victim.

== Life ==
Robinson was born in Belfast, Northern Ireland to Rab and Margaret Robinson, and brought up a Protestant on Disraeli Street in the staunchly loyalist Woodvale district of the Shankill Road. It is not known when he became a member of the local Ulster Volunteer Force (UVF). He held the rank of volunteer in its "B Company", 1st Battalion Belfast Brigade. By the time of his death he had moved to Forthriver Crescent in the Glencairn estate, an area immediately northwest of Woodvale.

== Death ==
On 2 September 1989, Robinson and fellow UVF member Davy McCullough were travelling on a motorbike, with Robinson as the passenger armed with a gun, in Belfast's Crumlin Road, close to the Irish nationalist area of Ardoyne. Upon seeing Paddy McKenna, a Catholic civilian, walking along the street, Robinson opened fire, hitting McKenna a total of 11 times and killing him. Unbeknownst to the two UVF members, an undercover British Army unit, linked to the Special Air Service, was in the area. Giving chase in a Vauxhall Astra car and a Fiat, the soldiers rammed the motorbike, forcing both men off the road. Robinson was shot twice in his torso, then twice more in the back of the head by a female soldier standing over him. He was 27. Upon hearing the news of her son's death, Robinson's mother Margaret suffered a fatal heart attack. The two were buried on the same day.

The UVF leadership in west Belfast would later claim that the intelligence leading to Robinson's death had been provided by one of their own men, Colin "Crazy" Craig, who had, they alleged, been a police informer for several years. Craig was killed by the Irish National Liberation Army on 16 June 1994, along with fellow UVF members Trevor King and David Hamilton. A UVF commander was quoted as mourning King and Hamilton, but adding that Craig was in line to be shot by the UVF anyway. Republican sources claim that the security forces infiltration of the UVF was even deeper, including Trevor King and "the most senior UVF figure in the North".

== Funeral ==
Robinson's funeral was well-attended as it left his home in Forthriver Crescent. Despite his membership of the UVF there were no paramilitary displays at the funeral, and the coffin was covered in the Union Jack instead of a UVF standard. Robinson was a member of the 'Old Boyne Heroes' lodge of the Orange Order, and several members wearing their sashes flanked the coffin. The cortege then met up with Margaret Robinson's funeral as it left her home in Crimea Street. A lorry carrying floral tributes led the cortege. Both mother and son were buried in Roselawn Cemetery. A death notice from Robinson's Orange lodge was published in the local press, which caused controversy.

== Commemorative parades ==
Robinson's death is commemorated annually in a band parade attended by loyalist bands in the Belfast area. One band, Star of the Shankill, has "In Memory of Brian Robinson" written on its crest and emblazoned upon its bass drum. The band also attracted controversy when it appeared at a parade organised by the Apprentice Boys that passed near the area in which Robinson killed his victim. In 2010, Rab Robinson, the brother of Brian, issued an appeal to the parades organisers to postpone the parade that year, owing to the death of his younger brother earlier that year.

Robinson is commemorated in a mural on Disraeli Street, off Woodvale Road in Belfast.

In 2015, his son Robert removed a Special Air Service flag that had been erected by the loyalists at Twaddell Avenue protest camp. The Shankill UVF was later said to be reviewing its policy of flying the flag.
