= Gino Gallagher =

Irish republican (1963–1996)

- Born: c. 1963; Ireland
- Died: 30 January 1996 (aged 32–33); Belfast, Northern Ireland
- Known for: Chief of Staff of the Irish National Liberation Army
- Political party: Irish Republican Socialist Party
- Military career
- Paramilitary: Irish National Liberation Army
- Rank: Chief of Staff
- Unit: Belfast Brigade
- Conflicts: The Troubles

Gino Gallagher (c. 1963 – 30 January 1996) was an Irish republican who was Chief of Staff of the Irish National Liberation Army (INLA).

== INLA ==
In August 1983, Gallagher and Paul "Bonanza" McCann were arrested by the Royal Ulster Constabulary (RUC) shortly after collecting four sticks of gelignite.

Gallagher was a central figure within the INLA's Belfast Brigade by 1994. On 9 July 1994, Gallagher acted as a scout during the INLA's killing of the UVF's Trevor King.

When Hugh Torney was captured in April 1995, he announced a cessation of all armed activity. Torney was then ousted from leadership and expelled, with Gallagher succeeding him as chief of staff. In June 1995, Gallagher, acting as spokesman for the IRSP, met the Minister of State at the Northern Ireland Office, Michael Ancram which resulted in a controversial handshake in the media.

Gallagher became more openly critical of the peace process and its role in the armed struggle, with rumours of the Provisional IRA threatening Gallagher.

== Murder ==
On the morning of 30 January 1996, Gallagher attended a social security office on the Falls Road where he signed on every two weeks. As he stood at the counter he was shot four times in the back of the head by a gunman and died instantly.

Gallagher's killing followed internal disagreements over the future of the republican socialist movement. The opposing "INLA-GHQ" faction, led by Hugh Torney, disbanded on 9 September of the same year following Torney's killing.

In March 1996, John Fennell, a founding member of the INLA who had joined the INLA-GHQ faction, was beaten to death and tortured in retaliation at a caravan park in Bundoran, County Donegal.

Kevin McAlorum, who was paid to kill Gallagher by Torney's faction, was himself murdered in 2004, although this was not linked to any political dispute.
