= Declan Duffy =

Former paramilitary and convicted murderer

Declan Duffy, also known as Declan "Whacker" Duffy, is an Irish former paramilitary member and convicted murderer.

== Early life ==
He is originally from Armagh, Northern Ireland.

== Paramilitary involvement ==
He joined the Irish National Liberation Army while still a teenager in the 1980s.

In 1999 he and several members of the INLA took six members of a criminal gang hostage. They held them at the Ballymount industrial estate. One hostage managed to use their mobile phone to call others and in the resulting fight, INLA member Patrick Campbell was stabbed and died.

In 2008 members of the INLA headed by Duffy carried out four attacks on members a gang headed by Freddie Thompson.

In May 2009 he pleaded guilty to membership of the organisation and also dissociated himself from it.

In July 2010 he pleaded guilty to the 1992 murder of Sergeant Michael Newman in Derby and was sentenced to 24 years.

He was released in 2013 under the terms of the Good Friday Agreement but was recalled to prison for breaching his licence in 2020. He is not now due for release until 2034 after losing an appeal in May 2024.

== Subsequent criminal career ==
He was arrested in July 2015 in Dublin in connection with allegations of extortion.

On 5 December 2015 he was arrested in connection with the abduction of Martin Byrne. He was convicted of false imprisonment on 6 June 2016. He had been released on licence but this was revoked after his conviction

He was then extradited to the UK in 2020 after his false imprisonment sentence was served in the Republic to resume serving the balance of his sentence for murder.
