= Trevor King =

British Ulster loyalist; Ulster Volunteer Force commander (1953–1994)

James Trevor King, also known as "Kingso" (1 July 1953 – 9 July 1994), was a British Ulster loyalist and a senior member of the Ulster Volunteer Force (UVF). He was commander of the UVF's "B" Company, 1st Belfast Battalion, holding the rank of lieutenant colonel. On 16 June 1994, he was one of three UVF men gunned down by the Irish National Liberation Army as he stood on the corner of Spier's Place and the Shankill Road in West Belfast, close to the UVF headquarters. His companion Colin Craig was killed on the spot, and David Hamilton, who was seriously wounded, died the next day in hospital. King was also badly injured; he lived for three weeks on a life-support machine before making the decision himself to turn it off.

Two days after the shooting, the UVF retaliated against Irish nationalists by carrying out the Loughinisland massacre against the Heights Bar, in which six Catholic customers were killed as they watched the Republic of Ireland play Italy in the World Cup football match.

There are several murals in the Shankill Road area commemorating King. One of these is a mural and plaque dedicated to him, David Hamiliton and William "Frenchie" Marchant, which stands at the Spiers Place and Shankill Road junction. An oversized mural painted on the gable end of a house in Disraeli Street, Woodvale, features a portrait of King with an inscription from a poem by Siegfried Sassoon.

== Ulster Volunteer Force ==
King was born in about 1953 in Belfast, Northern Ireland to an Ulster Protestant family. He joined the illegal Ulster loyalist paramilitary organisation the Ulster Volunteer Force (UVF) in the early 1970s whilst still in his teens. He was one of the gunmen who took part in the "Battle at Springmartin" on the night of 13 May 1972 when the UVF engaged the Provisional IRA in fierce gun battles at the interface area between the Protestant Springmartin and the Catholic Ballymurphy housing estates. He was arrested that same night by the Royal Ulster Constabulary (RUC) after he and another young man were caught working with a rifle bolt in the rear yard of a house in Blackmountain Pass. The rifle had jammed and the men had been attempting to free its bolt. Inside a bedroom, police found three Steyr rifles, ammunition and illuminating flares. Several hours earlier the UVF had exploded a car bomb outside Kelly's Bar on Whiterock Road and then taken up sniping positions from high-rise flats in Springmartin. That Saturday night saw the most violent gun battles since the suspension of Stormont and imposition of Direct Rule from London. Five people died in the clashes which continued on 14 May; these deaths included British soldier Alan Buckley, and teenagers John Pedlow (17), Michael Magee (15), and Martha Campbell (13).

When arraigned for trial after his arrest King told the court "I refuse to recognise this court, as an instrument of an illegal and undemocratic regime. Also I would like to make it clear [fellow UVF member and arrestee William] Graham is innocent of all charges". King spent time in prison for his involvement in the gun battle whilst Graham was acquitted. Evidence supplied by a supergrass helped to ensure that King was sent to Crumlin Road gaol.

Following his release King rose in the organisation's ranks to become a senior leader as commander of the UVF "B" Company, 1st Belfast Battalion which covered West Belfast, including the Shankill Road. He held the rank of lieutenant colonel, and was the director of UVF military operations.

Although King had been arrested numerous times, he was never prosecuted as witnesses were afraid to testify against him. According to The People newspaper he maintained an "iron grip" on the UVF from 1974. He was however held on remand in the Maze during the early 1980s and whilst in the prison camp he was close to Billy Hutchinson, who was Officer Commanding of the Maze UVF at the time. In 1984 he was charged in connection with the 1975 killings of Catholic civilians Gerard McClenahan and Anthony Molloy after being named by supergrass John Gibson as the latter's accomplice. King was acquitted after the case fell apart.

== Shooting ==
On 16 June 1994, King was standing on the corner of the Shankill Road and Spier's Place talking to fellow UVF members, David Hamilton (43) and Colin Craig (31). They were about one hundred yards away from the UVF headquarters, which was located in rooms above a shop known as "The Eagle". A car drove past them and as it did so, Irish National Liberation Army (INLA) gunmen inside the vehicle opened fire on the three men. David Lister and Hugh Jordan claimed that Gino Gallagher, who was himself shot dead in 1996 in an internal feud, was the main INLA gunman in the attack. Colin Craig was killed on the spot. King and David Hamilton lay in the street, seriously wounded as panic and chaos erupted on the Shankill in the wake of the shooting. Presbyterian minister, the Reverend Roy Magee was in "the Eagle" discussing an upcoming Combined Loyalist Military Command (CLMC) meeting and the possibility of a loyalist ceasefire with the UVF Brigade Staff (leadership) when the attack took place. He and the others raced out of the building after hearing the gunfire. He later described the scene he came upon outside.

With some others, I ran down to where the men were. One was already dead and the others were in a very, very bad physical state. The road was in pandemonium at that stage. You could see that the leadership of the UVF was quite naturally very, very broken and disturbed about the shooting of their colleague. He [Trevor King] was a senior commander.

King was rushed to hospital, where he was put on a life-support machine. The shooting had left him paralysed from the neck down. He died on 9 July with Reverend Magee at his bedside. According to Magee, King himself made the decision to turn off the machine.

The People alleged that prior to his shooting, he had been moving the UVF towards drug dealing and racketeering.

Alderman Joe Coggle, an Independent Unionist member of Belfast City Council, described him in a Belfast Telegraph obituary as "the best".

== UVF reaction ==
The UVF leadership was badly shaken by the attack, as it had taken place on the staunchly loyalist Shankill Road and involved a high-ranking member. The next day, after David Hamilton succumbed to his injuries, the UVF made its first moves to punish the Catholic community. A Catholic taxi driver was killed in Carrickfergus and two Protestants mistaken for Catholics were shot dead in Newtownabbey. On 18 June, the UVF struck again. Their target was the Heights Bar in Loughinisland, County Down. As customers sat watching Ireland play Italy in the World Cup football match, UVF gunmen stormed in spraying the bar with gunfire. In all, six Catholic civilians died and another five were wounded in the attack. A revenge attack on the INLA was also planned and in September UVF gunmen occupied the Lower Falls home of INLA chief of staff Hugh Torney and held his family hostage whilst they awaited Torney's return home. However the INLA leader, who had a reputation for being especially guarded about his public safety, got wind of the event and did not return home, resulting in the UVF members abandoning their attempt and releasing Torney's family.

It was subsequently revealed that Colin Craig had been an RUC informer. It was believed that he had provided intelligence to the security forces which enabled an undercover British Army unit to shoot UVF hitman Brian Robinson dead in 1989. A UVF leader had suggested after the triple shooting that Craig had been in line to be killed by the UVF anyway.

== Legacy ==
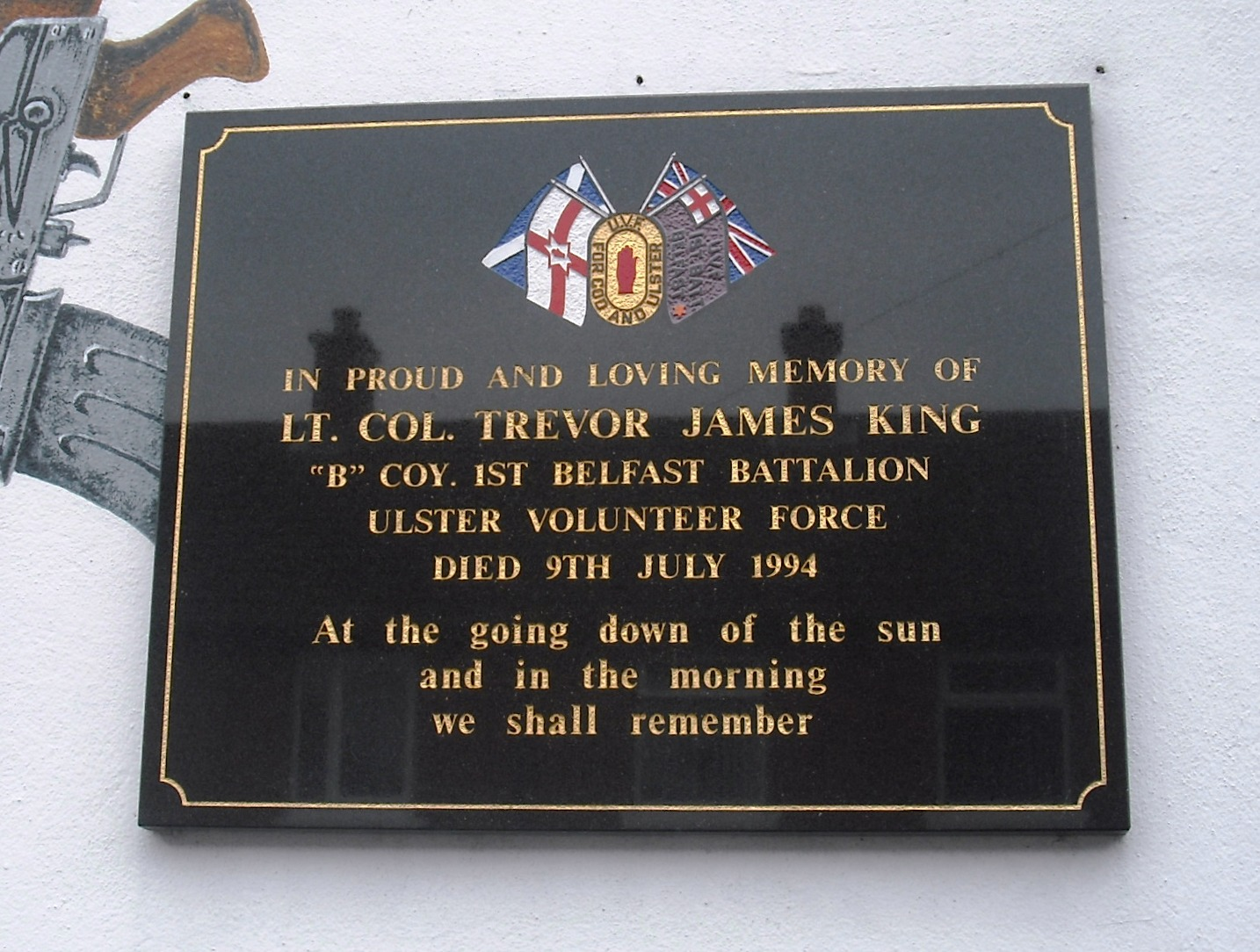
Close-up of plaque on King's Disraeli Street mural

King has been commemorated in loyalist songs, annual parades, and murals. A memorial plaque and mural stands at the junction of Spier's Place and Shankill Road junction close to the spot where King was fatally wounded. It is dedicated to him, David Hamilton and William "Frenchie" Marchant, a leading UVF member gunned down by the IRA at the same location in 1987. On the gable of a house in Disraeli Street in the Woodvale area, King is featured on one of three outsized murals commemorating killed loyalist paramilitaries (a fourth at the start of the street commemorates the Woodvale Defence Association in general). His is the middle mural, flanked by those representing Brian Robinson and Sam Rockett, UVF men killed by the Force Research Unit and Ulster Defence Association respectively. Beside King's mural there is an inscription taken from Suicide in the Trenches, a poem written by Siegfried Sassoon in 1917. It reads:

You smug faced crowds with kindling eye
who cheer when soldier lads pass by
sneak home and pray you'll never know
the hell where youth and laughter go.

There was a parade and ceremony to mark the mural's completion in July 1995, the first anniversary of his death. Loyalist bands paraded and laid floral wreaths at the base and Billy Hutchinson of the Progressive Unionist Party (and King's former Officer Commanding in Long Kesh) made a speech honouring King's memory.

In July 2000, on the sixth anniversary of his death, hundreds of people turned out on the Shankill Road to watch a memorial service held in honour of King. Three masked UVF men, two of whom were armed with rifles, took part in the ceremony. One supporter commented, "King was a legend in this area and it is only fitting that his anniversary should be marked by the organisation to which he devoted his life".
