= Patrick Campbell (INLA member) =

INLA volunteer

- Born: 1977; New Barnsley, Belfast, Northern Ireland
- Died: 10 October 1999 (aged 21–22); Walkinstown, Dublin, Ireland
- Cause of death: Bled to death from a severed artery
- Burial place: Milltown Cemetery
- Military career
- Paramilitary: Irish National Liberation Army
- Unit: Dublin Brigade

Patrick Campbell (1977–10 October 1999) was a volunteer in the Irish National Liberation Army (INLA) died on 10 October 1999 after being wounded during a conflict in Dublin, Republic of Ireland between the INLA and drug dealers.

== Background ==
Campbell was born in the New Barnsley area of West Belfast, Northern Ireland. Campbell's father was Robert "Fats" Campbell, a member of a Provisional IRA'sM60 gang'. He moved to Dublin to work in the building industry. At some point, he joined the INLA, an Irish republican and Socialist paramilitary group.

== Dispute ==
In the summer of 1999, the INLA became involved in a violent dispute with criminals in West Dublin. The INLA claims that it was trying to halt the sale of illegal drugs in the local working class community.

== Death ==
On 6 October 1999, Campbell, Declan Duffy and another INLA men captured the drug gang members in a warehouse in Ballymount Industrial Estate in Walkinstown. The INLA men were bundling the captured men into a van, when other drug gang members arrived at the scene in another van. Believing the van to be the Garda's Emergency Response Unit (who had shot dead a member of the INLA in Tallaght a year prior) launching an ambush, the INLA unit attempted to flee. Campbell failed to escape and was brought back to the warehouse and tortured by the other gang. One of the gang members severed the tendons in Campbell's leg with a samurai sword, severing an artery in the process and causing Campbell to bleed to death. When Gardaí arrived at the scene later they described a "river of blood".

He was buried with full military honours in Milltown Cemetery in Belfast by the INLA who staged a show of force including a uniformed colour party. Over 1,000 people attended his funeral. Campbell's funeral was one of the last high-profile republican paramilitary funerals in Ireland to date. A man was charged with Campbell's murder, though the murder charges were later dropped. Several more shootings have since been attributed to the feud, with the INLA retaliating for Campbell's murder with the murder of Patrick Neville in the St Michael's Estate area of Inchicore, Dublin in April 2000.
