= Droppin Well bombing =

1982 Irish National Liberation Army attack in Ballykelly, Northern Ireland

- Part of the Troubles
- Location: 55°02′39″N 7°01′11″W; Ballykelly, County Londonderry, Northern Ireland, United Kingdom
- Date: 6 December 1982; 23:15 (UTC±0)
- Attack type: Bombing
- Weapon: Time bomb
- Deaths: 17 (11 soldiers, 6 civilians)
- Injuries: 66
- Perpetrator: Irish National Liberation Army

The Droppin Well bombing or Ballykelly bombing occurred on 6 December 1982, when the Irish National Liberation Army (INLA) detonated a time bomb at a disco in Ballykelly, County Londonderry, Northern Ireland, United Kingdom. The disco, known as the Droppin Well, was targeted because it was frequented by British Army soldiers from nearby Shackleton Barracks. The bomb killed 17 people: eleven soldiers and six civilians, while dozens more were wounded. It was the deadliest attack during the INLA's paramilitary campaign and one of the deadliest bombings of The Troubles.

== Attack ==
The bomb was made by the INLA in nearby Derry. One of those involved later revealed that the INLA unit had carried out reconnaissance missions to the Droppin Well to see if there were enough soldiers to justify the likelihood of civilian casualties.

On the evening of 6 December 1982, an INLA member left a bomb inside the pub. There were about 150 people inside. The Royal Ulster Constabulary (RUC) believed that the bomb, estimated to be 5 to 10 pounds (2.3 to 4.5 kg) of commercial (Frangex) explosives, was small enough to fit into a handbag. It had, however, been left beside a support pillar and, when it exploded at about 23:15, the blast brought down the roof. Many of those killed and injured were crushed by fallen masonry.

Following the blast, it took a few hours to pull survivors from the rubble. The last survivor was freed at 04:00, but it was not until 10:30 that the last of the bodies was recovered. Ultimately, 17 people died (11 soldiers, six civilians) and about 30 were injured, some seriously. Five of the civilians were young women and three (Alan Callaghan, Valerie McIntyre and Angela Maria Hoole) were teenagers. Angela Hoole was celebrating her engagement to one of the soldiers who survived the incident. Of the eleven soldiers who died, eight were from the 1st Battalion Cheshire Regiment, two from the Army Catering Corps and one from the Light Infantry. One of those on the scene was Bob Stewart, then a company commander in the Cheshire Regiment. He lost six soldiers from his company and was deeply affected as he tended to the dead and injured.

== Aftermath ==
Suspicion immediately fell upon the Provisional Irish Republican Army (IRA), who denied involvement. By 8 December, the British Army was blaming the INLA on grounds that the IRA, in a mixed village, would have made greater efforts not to risk killing civilians.

Shortly afterwards, the INLA issued a statement of responsibility:

We believe that it is only attacks of such a nature that bring it home to people in Britain and the British establishment. The shooting of an individual soldier, for the people of Britain, has very little effect in terms of the media or in terms of the British administration.

The INLA also described the civilians killed as "consorts". The attack was criticised by many on both sides of the conflict in Northern Ireland due to the high loss of civilian lives. Soon after the INLA had issued its statement, the government of the Republic of Ireland banned the INLA, making membership punishable by seven years imprisonment.

In an interview after the bombing, INLA leader Dominic McGlinchey said that the Droppin Well's owner had been warned six times to stop offering entertainment to British soldiers. McGlinchey added that the owner, and those who socialised with the soldiers, "knew full well that the warnings had been given and that the place was going to be bombed at some stage". During an Easter Rising commemoration in Derry in April 1982 the INLA read a statement at the grave of hunger striker Patsy O'Hara warning that public houses serving British security forces would be bombed. The threat was the first of its kind issued by any paramilitary organisation in Northern Ireland for several years.

Six days after the bombing, RUC officers shot and killed two unarmed INLA members, Seamus Grew and Roddy Carroll, close to a vehicle checkpoint in Armagh. The officers said they believed that the two men were ferrying McGlinchey into Northern Ireland. McGlinchey was not in their car at the time.

== Convictions ==
In June 1986, four INLA members (sisters Anna Moore and Helena Semple, Eamon Moore (no blood relation) and Patrick Shotter) received life sentences for the attack. Anna Moore would later marry loyalist Bobby Corry, while both were in prison. Anna's daughter, Jacqueline Moore, was given ten years for manslaughter as the court believed she had been coerced into involvement. She was pregnant during her arrest and later gave birth in jail. All of those convicted were from Derry.

== See also ==
- Timeline of Irish National Liberation Army actions
