= Darkley killings =

Mass shooting near Darkley, County Antrim (1983)

- Part of the Troubles
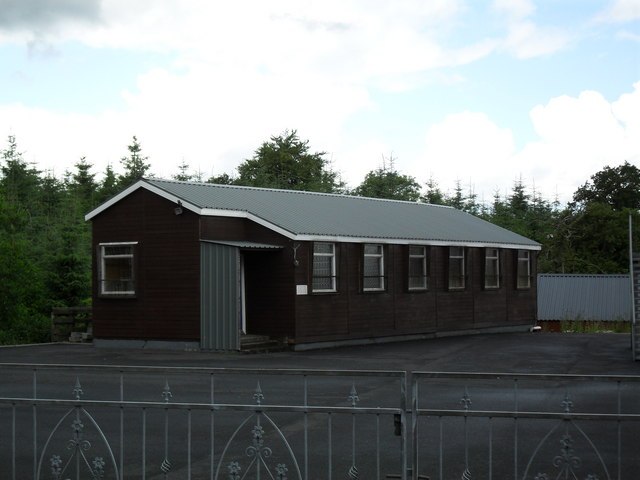
- The church where the killings took place

- Location: 54°13′05″N 6°40′20″W; Darkley, County Armagh, Northern Ireland
- Date: 20 November 1983; 19:00 (GMT)
- Attack type: Mass shooting
- Deaths: 3
- Injuries: 7
- Perpetrator: Members of the INLA using the covername "Catholic Reaction Force"

The Darkley killings or Darkley massacre was a gun attack carried out on 20 November 1983 near the village of Darkley in County Armagh, Northern Ireland. Three gunmen attacked worshippers attending a church service at Mountain Lodge Pentecostal Church, killing three Protestant civilians and wounding seven. The attackers were members of the Irish National Liberation Army (INLA) acting on their own. They claimed responsibility using the cover name "Catholic Reaction Force", saying it was retaliation for recent sectarian attacks on Catholics by the loyalist "Protestant Action Force". The attack was condemned by the INLA leadership.

== Background ==
In the months before the Darkley killings, several Catholic civilians were killed by loyalists. On 29 October 1983, a Catholic civilian member of the Workers' Party, David Nocher (26), was shot dead in Belfast. On 8 November, Catholic civilian Adrian Carroll (24) was shot dead in Armagh, UDR personnel were later convicted but the convictions were cleared on appeal for three of them (see UDR Four case). Carroll was the brother of an INLA member who was killed a year earlier. These attacks were claimed by the "Protestant Action Force" (PAF), a cover name used mostly by members of the Ulster Volunteer Force. It is believed the Darkley killings were primarily a retaliation for the killing of Carroll.

== Attack ==
On the evening of Sunday 20 November, about sixty people were attending a church service at Mountain Lodge Pentecostal Church. The small, isolated wooden church was outside the village of Darkley, near the border with the Republic of Ireland and several miles from Armagh. As the service began, three masked gunmen arrived, and opened fire on those standing at the entrance. Three church elders were killed: Harold Browne (59), Victor Cunningham (39) and David Wilson (44). The fatally wounded Wilson staggered into the service, where he collapsed and died. The gunmen then stood outside the building and sprayed it with bullets, wounding a further seven people, before fleeing in a car. The service was being tape-recorded when the attack took place. On the cassette tape, the congregation can be heard singing the hymn "Are You Washed in the Blood?", followed by the sound of gunfire. All of the victims were Protestant civilians.

== Aftermath ==
In a telephone call to a journalist, a caller claimed responsibility for the attack on behalf of the "Catholic Reaction Force". He said it was "retaliation for the murderous sectarian campaign carried out by the Protestant Action Force" and added, "By this token retaliation we could easily have taken the lives of at least 20 more innocent Protestants. We serve notice on the PAF to call an immediate halt to their vicious indiscriminate campaign against innocent Catholics, or we will make the Darkley killings look like a picnic". The caller named nine Catholics who had been attacked.

The name "Catholic Reaction Force" had never been used before, and police said they believed the attack was carried out by members of the INLA. The INLA condemned the attack and denied direct involvement, but said it was investigating the involvement of INLA members or weapons. A week later, INLA leader Dominic McGlinchey admitted that one of the gunmen had been an INLA member and admitted supplying him with the gun, but said there was no justification for the attack. The INLA member's brother had been killed by loyalists. McGlinchey explained that the INLA member had asked him for a gun to shoot a known loyalist who had been involved in sectarian killings. However, "clearly deranged by the death of his brother", he "used it instead to attack the Darkley Gospel Hall". McGlinchey said: "he must have been unbalanced or something to have gone and organised this killing. We are conducting an inquiry".

There were reprisal sectarian attacks on Catholics in North Belfast, Lisburn, and Portadown within 24 hours of the Darkley massacre. On 5 December, fifteen days after the Darkley attack, the PAF shot dead INLA member Joseph Craven (26) in Newtownabbey.

The name "Catholic Reaction Force" was used several other times. In August 1984 it was used to issue a threat to newspapers against the families of Royal Ulster Constabulary (RUC) officers, after a Catholic man (Sean Downes) died after the RUC shot him with a plastic bullet during an anti-internment march on the Andersontown Road, Belfast. In May 1986 it was used to claim the killing of Protestant civilian David Wilson (39), who was shot while driving his firm's van in Donaghmore. The IRA also claimed responsibility, saying Wilson was a member of the UDR. The "Catholic Reaction Force" declared a ceasefire on 28 October 1994. In 2001 the name was used to claim two attacks on homes in which there were no injuries, and in 2002 was used to issue a threat to hospital workers suspected of links to the security forces.

== See also ==
- Kingsmill massacre– sectarian mass shooting in Northern Ireland in 1976
- South Armagh Republican Action Force
