= Darkley =

Village in County Armagh, Northern Ireland

Coordinates: 54.22214°N 6.6795°W

Darkley: Irish: Dearclaigh
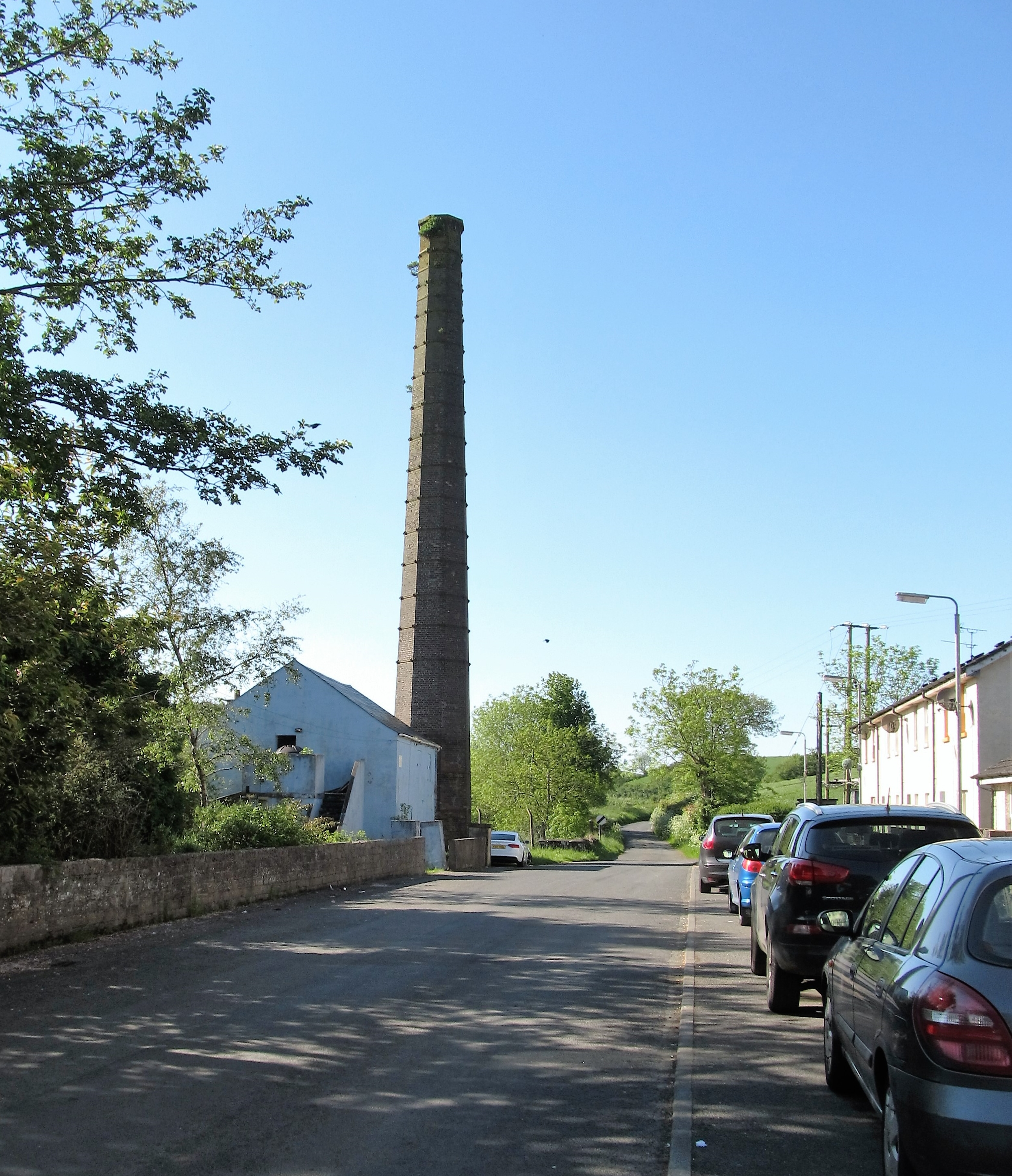
- Village with mill chimney

- Location within Northern Ireland
- Population: 224
- Irish grid reference: H861312
  - Belfast: 51 miles
- District: Armagh
- County: County Armagh
- Country: Northern Ireland
- Sovereign state: United Kingdom
- Post town: ARMAGH
- Postcode district: BT60
- Dialling code: 028
- UK Parliament: Newry and Armagh
- NI Assembly: Newry and Armagh

Darkley (from Irish Dearclaigh, meaning 'place of caves/hollows') is a small village and townland near Keady in County Armagh, Northern Ireland. It had a population of 224 people (80 households) in the 2011 Census. (2001 Census: 282 people)

== History ==
Darkley is first mentioned on the Maps of the Escheated Counties (1609) which were drawn up at the beginning of the Plantation of Ulster. It was part of an ancient precinct called Toaghy (Irish: Tuath Uí Eachaidh), a narrow strip of land that stretched from Darkley to Killylea.

See Darkley Killings for a list of incidents in Darkley during The Troubles resulting in two or more fatalities.

== Education ==
The first schools in the Darkley were hedge schools. Later, schools were founded in the townlands that surround Darkley such as Aughnagurgan & Corkley and Tullyglush. The first school in Darkley was a Protestant school built in 1856 by William Kirk, M.P., and opened its doors in 1857. The first headmaster was James Young, who had previously taught at Berry Street National School in Belfast. In 1932, a piece of land was donated by Mr. James E. Calvert for the purpose of building a new school. The other school had fallen into disrepair and had been condemned. On 30 May 1932, the new school opened in Moss Row. The headmaster was William Clarke.

== Sports ==
The local GAA club is Phelim Brady's (Irish: Cumann Fhéilim Mhic Bhrádaigh), which plays football in the Armagh Junior competitions.
