= Irish National Liberation Army =

Irish republican paramilitary group formed in 1974

- Arm Saoirse Náisiúnta na hÉireann
- An INLA logo consisting of the Starry Plough and the Flag of Ireland with a red star and a fist holding an AK-47-derivative rifle.
- Leaders: Seamus Costello; Ronnie Bunting; Dominic McGlinchey; Hugh Torney; Gino Gallagher
- Dates active: 8 December 1974 – 11 October 2009 (34 years, 307 days): On ceasefire since 1998, formally ended armed campaign in 2009
- Split from: Official Irish Republican Army
- Active regions: Ireland; Great Britain; Continental Europe
- Ideology: Communism; Marxism–Leninism; Left-wing nationalism; Irish republicanism; Anti-imperialism; Revolutionary socialism
- Political position: Far-left
- Size: Unknown, at least 80 members at first meeting in December 1974; Estimated to have 100 active members in June 1983
- Wars: The Troubles

The Irish National Liberation Army (INLA, Irish: Arm Saoirse Náisiúnta na hÉireann) is an Irish republican socialist paramilitary group formed on 8 December 1974, during the 30-year period of conflict known as "the Troubles". The group seeks to remove Northern Ireland from the United Kingdom and create a socialist republic encompassing all of Ireland. With membership estimated at 80–100 at their peak, it is the paramilitary wing of the Irish Republican Socialist Party (IRSP).

The INLA was founded by former members of the Official Irish Republican Army who opposed that group's ceasefire. It was initially known as the People's Liberation Army. The INLA waged a paramilitary campaign against the British Army and Royal Ulster Constabulary (RUC) in Northern Ireland. It was also active to a lesser extent in the Republic of Ireland, Great Britain and mainland Europe. High-profile attacks carried out by the INLA include the Droppin Well bombing, the 1994 Shankill Road killings and the assassinations of Airey Neave in 1979 and Billy Wright in 1997. However, it was smaller and less active than the main republican paramilitary group, the Provisional IRA. It was also weakened by feuds and internal tensions. Members of the group used the cover names People's Liberation Army, People's Republican Army, and Catholic Reaction Force for attacks its volunteers carried out but the INLA did not want to claim responsibility for. The INLA became a proscribed group in the United Kingdom on 3 July 1979 under the 1974 Prevention of Terrorism Act.

After a 24-year armed campaign, the INLA declared a ceasefire on 22 August 1998. In August 1999, it stated that "There is no political or moral argument to justify a resumption of the campaign". In October 2009, the INLA formally vowed to pursue its aims through peaceful political means and began decommissioning its weapons. The IRSP supports a "No First Strike" policy, that is allowing people to see the perceived failure of the peace process for themselves without military actions. The INLA is a proscribed organisation in the United Kingdom under the Terrorism Act 2000 and an illegal organisation in the Republic of Ireland.

== History ==
=== Origins ===
During the 1960s, the Irish Republican Army (led by chief-of-staff Cathal Goulding) and Sinn Féin radically re-assessed their ideology and tactics after the dismal failure of the IRA's Border Campaign in the years 1956–62. They were heavily influenced by popular-front ideology and drew close to communist thinking. A key intermediary body was the Communist Party of Great Britain's organisation for Irish exiles, the Connolly Association. Marxist analysis saw the conflict in Northern Ireland as a "bourgeois nationalist" one between the Ulster Protestant and Irish Catholic working classes, fomented and continued by the ruling class. The effect of this conflict was to depress wages, since worker could be set against worker. They concluded that the first step on the road to a 32-county socialist republic in Ireland was the "democratisation" of Northern Ireland (i.e., the removal of discrimination against Catholics) and radicalisation of the southern working-class. This would allow "class politics" to develop, eventually resulting in a challenge to the hegemony both of what they termed "British imperialism" and of the respective unionist and Irish nationalist establishments north and south of the Irish border.

In August 1969 a major outbreak of intercommunal violence occurred in Northern Ireland, with eight deaths, six of them Catholics. On 14–15 August loyalists burned out several Catholic streets in Belfast in the Northern Ireland riots of August 1969. IRA units offered resistance, however very few weapons were available for the defence of Catholic areas. These events and the dissatisfaction of more traditional and militant republicans with the political direction taken by the IRA leaders, particularly their moves to end Abstentionism, led to a split and the formation of the Provisional IRA.

The "Official" IRA units who remained loyal to Goulding occasionally fought the British Army and the RUC throughout 1970 (as well as the Provisional IRA during a 1970 feud). In August 1971, after the introduction of internment without trial, Official IRA (OIRA) units fought numerous gun-battles with British troops who were deployed to arrest suspected republicans. However, the OIRA declared a ceasefire in 1972. The ceasefire, announced on 30 May, followed a number of armed actions which had been politically damaging. The organisation bombed the headquarters of the Parachute Regiment (the main perpetrators of Bloody Sunday) in Aldershot, but killed only five female cleaners, a gardener and an army chaplain. After the killing of William Best, a Catholic British soldier home on leave in Derry, the OIRA declared a ceasefire. In addition, the death of several militant OIRA figures such as Joe McCann in confrontations with British soldiers, enabled the Goulding faction to call off their armed campaign, which it had never supported wholeheartedly.

As time passed, discontent with the ceasefire in the movement grew. Seamus Costello, IRA veteran, operations officer for "general headquarters staff" (GHQ) and an elected representative on both Bray Urban District Council and Wicklow County Council, became the figurehead of those within the Official movement opposed to it. In 1972 an Official IRA army convention voted to endorse Costello's position of continued support for armed struggle in Northern Ireland. However, supporters of Costello did not have the numbers on the Army Council to enable what was voted for at the convention. At Official Sinn Féin Ardfheis in 1972 and 1973 Costello's policy was accepted by the rank and file but blocked by the party executive. A smear campaign was initiated against Costello and he was marginalised within the movement; some of his prominent associates were expelled. Costello himself was dismissed from Sinn Féin after ignoring an order not to stand in local elections or to attend meetings of the two local authorities of which he was a member. In spring 1974 Costello was also court-martialled by the Official IRA. Meanwhile, Costello's emerging anti-ceasefire faction, amongst them several Belfast men (including Ronnie Bunting, a Protestant nationalist), carried out a series of robberies in the Republic to pay for arms. At the Sinn Féin Ardfheis in Dublin on 1 December 1974, a Costello sympathiser proposed a motion overturning his dismissal. However, many of Costello's supporters had been blocked from entering, including the most articulate who would have been able to sway the members gathered. The motion was defeated by 197 votes to 15 and a split now appeared inevitable. Local branches of Official Sinn Féin throughout the island of Ireland announced they were resigning from the party, and on 8 December the dissidents met in the Spa Hotel in Lucan, Dublin.

=== Foundation ===
The Irish Republican Socialist Party was founded on 8 December 1974 in the Spa Hotel in Lucan, Dublin and the movement's military wing, the Irish National Liberation Army, was founded later the same day. The IRSP's foundation was made public but the INLA's was kept a secret until the group could operate effectively. One delegate suggested the armed wing be named the Irish Citizen Army after the paramilitary group founded by James Connolly that participated in the 1916 Easter Rising but this was rejected by Costello because of sectarian attacks carried out in Northern Ireland by another group using the same name. Costello advocated the name "National Liberation Army" and this appeared in some subsequent claims of responsibility for attacks, although delegates settled on "Irish National Liberation Army". Unlike the Provisional IRA, and the Official IRA who also saw themselves as inheritors of the tradition, by no longer claiming to be the "Irish Republican Army" the INLA abandoned a series of perceived political inheritances which constructed a legal continuity from the Second Dáil.

At a press conference five days later Costello read a statement outlining how the IRSP would seek to build a "broad front" on the basis of demanding a British declaration of intent to withdraw from Northern Ireland, the release of all internees and sentenced "political prisoners", abolish all repressive legislation, outlaw discrimination of all kinds, and "agree to compensate the Irish People for the exploitation which has already occurred." In the statement, Costello summarised the "broad front" strategy:

It shall be the policy of the Irish Republican Socialist Party to seek an active working alliance of all radical forces within the context of the Broad Front in order to ensure the ultimate success of the Irish Working Class in their struggle for Socialism.

The IRSP also called for an end to sectarian murders "on the basis of united action by Catholic and Protestant working class against British Imperialism in Ireland", opposition to Ireland joining the European Economic Community, nationalisation of natural resources, and the "formation of people's organisations to combat rising prices an unemployment". Costello explained that the IRSP did not practice abstentionism and would consider contesting an election depending on a "thorough analysis of the conditions prevailing at the time". Prominent republican activist Bernadette Devlin McAliskey attended the press conference as County Tyrone's representative on the party's executive, giving the new organisation republican credibility.

The Starry Plough is often used to represent the IRSP and INLA

Shortly after it was founded, the INLA/IRSP came under attack from their former comrades in the Official IRA, who wanted to destroy the new grouping before it could get off the ground. On 20 February 1975, Hugh Ferguson, an INLA member and an Irish Republican Socialist Party (IRSP) branch chairperson, was the first person to be killed in the feud. One of the first military operations of the INLA was the shooting of OIRA leader Sean Garland in Dublin on 1 March. Although shot six times, he survived. After several more shootings (according to the RUC the feud had claimed two lives and wounded nineteen others up to this point) a truce was arranged, but fighting started again. The most prominent victim of the restarted feud was Billy McMillen, the commander of the OIRA in Belfast, shot by INLA member Gerard Steenson. His murder was unauthorised and was condemned by Costello. This was followed by several more assassinations on both sides, the most prominent victim being Seamus Costello, who was shot dead on the North Strand Road in Dublin on 5 October 1977. Costello's death was a severe blow to the INLA, as he was their most able political and military leader. The Official and Provisional IRAs both denied responsibility and Sinn Féin/The Workers' Party issued a statement condemning the killing. Members of an opposing INLA faction in Belfast also denied the killing. However, the INLA eventually deemed Official IRA member Jim Flynn the person responsible, and he was shot dead in June 1982 in the North Strand, Dublin, very close to the spot where Costello died.

It has been claimed by some in the Republican Socialist Movement that one of their members killed in 1975, Brendan McNamee (who was involved in the killing of Billy McMillen), was actually killed by Provisional IRA members. The Officials had denied involvement at the time of the killing and had instead blamed it on the Provisionals, who also denied involvement.

The inter-republican violence had a negative effect on the growth of the fledgling IRSP; its first Ardfheis, scheduled for the end of March, had to be cancelled. Bernadette McAliskey and others left the IRSP in late 1975 after a dispute over a number of issues, most urgent being the question of whether the armed wing should be subordinate to the IRSP's political leadership. It was later reported McAliskey had attempted to initiate a discussion to clarify the status of the People's Liberation Army (PLA), what would later become the INLA, but the motion was defeated by majority vote and Costello insisted the PLA was a separate organisation from the IRSP and discussing its affairs was improper. After her resignation McAliskey accused the IRSP of "being objectively indistinguishable from either wing of the republican movement and possibly combining the worst elements of both". At the end of its first year in existence the IRSP had not progressed as Costello had hoped; ten members of the Ard-Chomhairle had resigned, the organisation in Derry had lost many members, Belfast was at odds with the leadership, and recruitment overall had been hurt by the bloody feud with the Official IRA.

=== Armed campaign ===
An INLA active service unit posing with weapons in South Armagh, 11 November 1986

The National Liberation Army (NLA) announced its existence and claimed responsibility for several attacks on British security forces in a press release published in November 1975, sent to newspapers and diplomatic missions in London, although the statement was issued too late to be included in the December issue of The Starry Plough.

We wish to issue the following press statement on behalf of the Army Council of the National Liberation Army. The NLA was recently formed with the aim of ending British Imperialist rule in Ireland and creating a 32 county Democratic Socialist Republic. As revolutionaries, we recognise the paramount necessity for the existence of an armed Anti-Imperialist organisation, which will play an effective role in the current struggle. We totally reject the right of Britain to interfere in Irish affairs and we are determined to resist any British-imposed solution, through the use of armed force against British Occupation Forces and their allies in Ireland.

In February 1976 a statement was issued declaring that the "National Liberation Army" and "People's Liberation Army" (the nom de guerre employed by the INLA during its feud with the Official IRA) had merged to form a single organisation. Reportedly the People's Liberation Army name was chosen without the oversight of the group's Dublin-based leadership, although apparently throughout 1976 the INLA in Derry was still known to its own members and outsiders as the PLA. In July 1976 the PLA in Derry issued a lengthy statement concurring with a recent IRSP statement on recovering from the November split, and stressed the necessity of the PLA as a socialist alternative to the Provisional IRA in the fight against British imperialism. Journalists had already deduced the Irish National Liberation Army was the military wing of the IRSP following the November 1975 press release, although the IRSP would only admit that they had accepted "protection" from "armed groups" in their feud with the Official IRA.

The INLA from its inception adopted a republican-paramilitary structure similar to the IRA. Under a chief of staff was an eight-man army council, the ultimate decision-making body of the organisation. All major operations were supposed to be sanctioned by the army council. Under the army council was "general headquarters staff" (GHQ). They acted as couriers, supplying INLA units with what they dubbed "gear" or "logistics" - weapons and explosives. In return, GHQ received information on potential targets and proceeds from robberies. Next came the "brigades", which were generally much smaller than those of the Provisional IRA. The INLA did not re-organise its brigades into smaller cells as the Provisional IRA did in the late-Seventies, which proved extremely damaging during the supergrass trials of the mid-Eighties. The INLA leadership later admitted that their failure to do this was a serious weakness, but argued to maintain recruitment and pursue its political ambitions it had to stay in touch with the "civilian" population. In January 1983 the INLA leadership said they hoped to implement a more cellular system throughout the year but it's unlikely this plan to come to fruition in the wake of damaging police penetration. However, interviewed in late 1983, then INLA leader Dominic McGlinchey asserted the cell system had been introduced throughout the organisation.

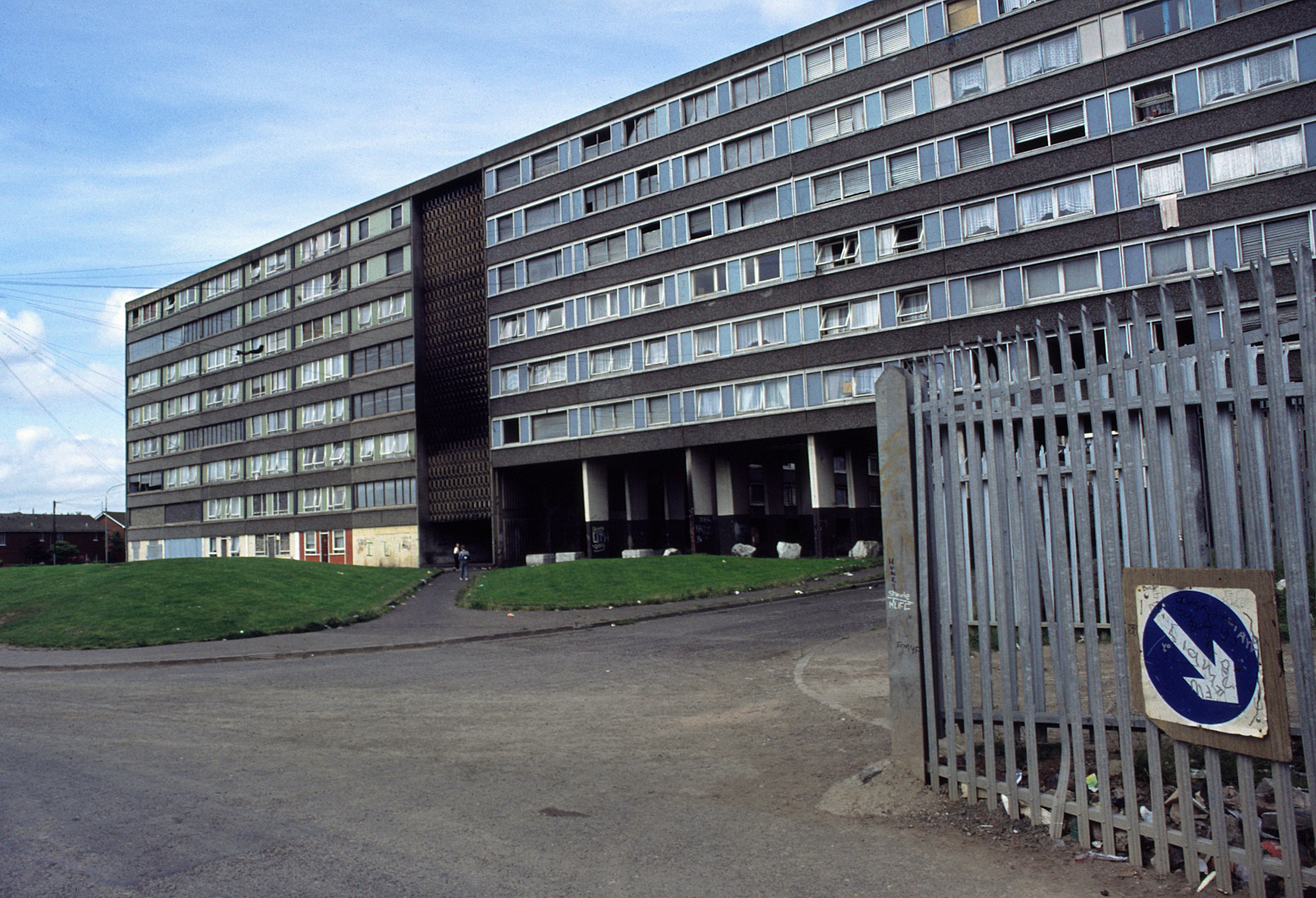
Divis Flats, Belfast

In the late 1970s and early 1980s, the INLA developed into a modest organisation in Northern Ireland, operating primarily from the Divis Flats in west Belfast, which, as a result, became colloquially known as "the planet of the Irps" (a reference to the IRSP and the film Planet of the Apes). They also had a large presence in Derry and the surrounding area, and all three of the INLA prisoners who died in the 1981 Irish hunger strike were from County Londonderry. Northern County Armagh reportedly had a significant INLA/IRSP presence also. In the Republic of Ireland the INLA/IRSP was primarily based in Dublin and Munster. From 1982 onwards the INLA also established units in Newry, Downpatrick and several rural border areas. The first member of the security forces to be killed by the INLA was an RUC officer, Noel Davis, killed on 24 May 1975 by a booby trap bomb left in a car in Ballinahone, near Maghera, County Londonderry. During this period, the INLA competed with the Provisional IRA for members, with both groups in conflict with the British Army and the Royal Ulster Constabulary. The INLA leader in Belfast, Ronnie Bunting, called in claims of responsibility to the media by the code name "Captain Green".

The first action to bring the INLA to international notice was its assassination on 30 March 1979 of Airey Neave, the British Conservative Party's spokesman on Northern Ireland and one of Margaret Thatcher's closest political supporters. Through the 1970s Neave, an influential Tory Member of the House of Commons, had been advocating within British political circles for an abandonment of the British Government's strategy of a containment of Irish paramilitary violence in Northern Ireland against the British State, and for the adoption of a strategy of waging a military offensive against it seeking its martial defeat. This brought him to the attention of both the Provisional IRA and the INLA as a potential threat to their organisations and activities. The INLA issued a statement regarding the attack in the August 1979 edition of its publication The Starry Plough:

In March, retired terrorist and supporter of capital punishment, Airey Neave, got a taste of his own medicine when an INLA unit pulled off the operation of the decade and blew him to bits inside the 'impregnable' Palace of Westminster. The nauseous Margaret Thatcher snivelled on television that he was an 'incalculable loss' – and so he was – to the British ruling class.

The attention the INLA received following the death of Airey Neave led to it being declared an illegal organisation in Britain and Northern Ireland. However, despite the "success" of the 30 March action, the INLA was facing internal turmoil. IRSP chairperson Miriam Daly threatened to resign over policy disagreements and perceived failings of the IRSP to raise funds, run in elections, and enact policy. Senior IRSP member Michael Plunkett was arrested after gardaí found bomb-making equipment in his flat in Dublin and later jumped bail and fled to Paris. A series of botched Middle East arms importation attempts precipitated tensions between Belfast and Dublin representatives to the INLA GHQ and Dessie Grew considered assassinating the leader of the Belfast faction opposed to the INLA chief of staff. Before the conflict broke out there were attempts to recruit veteran Provisional IRA leader Seán Mac Stíofáin as INLA chief of staff in the hope he would help stabilise the organisation. He was interested and met with INLA Army Council representatives on several occasions between 1978 and 1979 but nothing materialised. The unauthorised kidnapping of a Dublin bank manager from his home in January 1980 led to further internal anger and an operation in England was planned to demonstrate that the INLA was still capable of carrying on its war. An INLA Active service unit planted two 10 lb bombs at Netheravon British Army camp in the Salisbury Plain Training Area. Although only one bomb detonated & caused damage starting a fire, and injuring two soldiers, this action helped bind the organisation together.

The INLA lost another of its founding leadership in 1980, when Ronnie Bunting was assassinated at his home. Noel Lyttle, another Protestant member of the IRSP, was killed in the same incident. The Ulster Defence Association, an Ulster loyalist paramilitary, claimed responsibility for both killings. Miriam Daly, who had resigned from the IRSP four months earlier, was killed by loyalist assassins in the same year. Although no group claimed responsibility, the INLA claimed that the Special Air Service (SAS) was involved in the killings of Bunting and Little. All three were strongly identified with the campaign against criminalisation of republican paramilitary prisoners.

=== Hunger strike ===
IRA and INLA prisoners convicted after March 1976 did not have Special Category Status applied in prison. Defending paramilitary prisoners' right to special category status, i.e. political status was an issue the IRSP and INLA advocated for from the outset, both within the prisons and on outside, when others, including the Provisional IRA and Sinn Féin, seemed reluctant to do so. This could be partly attributed to IRSP/INLA prisoners being immediately forced into confrontation with prison staff as soon as the movement was formed. Because IRSP prisoners were not members of the Official IRA or Provisional IRA they were denied political status while it was still granted and in summer 1975 twenty IRSP prisoners went on hunger strike for the right to wear their own clothes, to associate freely, refuse to do prison work, and to elect their own spokesmen. These would later become the core of the five demands of the H-Block protest and the 1981 hunger strike was fought. As the 1 March 1976 deadline for the removal of special category status approached the Northern Ireland Office met with a council of representing all paramilitary organisations, loyalist and republican, inside Long Kesh prison. The British offered concessions in return for the removal of special category status. Only the IRSP would go on to flatly refuse the offer.

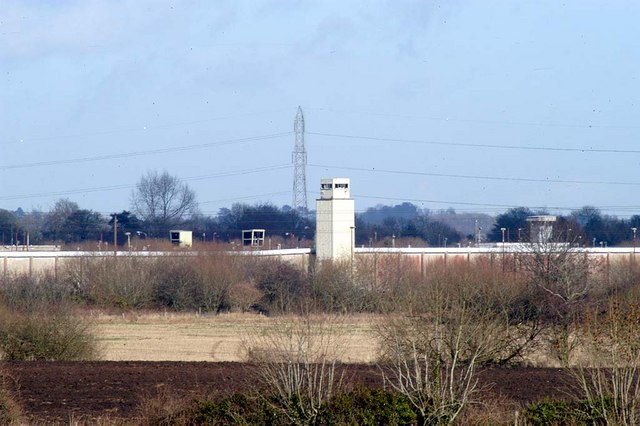
Maze prison near Belfast, site of the prisoners' protests and hunger strike

On 14 November the first IRSP/INLA prisoner, James Connolly Brady of Derry, joined the blanket protest. Both the INLA and IRA attacked prison staff outside the prison. However, unlike Sinn Féin, the IRSP engaged in popular agitation on the streets in Dublin, Belfast, Cork, and elsewhere. Behind the public rhetoric, there was deep concern within the IRSP about the commitment of the IRA/Sinn Féin to the H-Block protest; Sinn Féin had voted at its Ard Chomhairle to prohibit cooperation with the IRSP in protest activities in the South and in June 1978 Sinn Féin protests stopped as it emerged the IRA were in secret negotiations with mediators. According to Holland and McDonald, "as conditions inside the H-Blocks deteriorated, so did relations between the IRSP and the Provisionals." The Sinn Féin Ard-Chomhairle put out a directive in September 1978 banning any IRSP speaker from sharing a Provisional speaker, and at a meeting held in Liberty Hall to discuss the prison crisis all the Provisionals walked out when Mick Plunkett stood up to speak. The IRA regarded the prisons campaign as a distraction from the armed struggle and were reluctant to get too involved in any protest movement they could not control. However, hunger strike publicity events in continental Europe received an enthusiastic reception.

On 27 October 1980, republican prisoners in HM Prison Maze began a hunger strike. One hundred and forty-eight prisoners volunteered to be part of the strike, but a total of seven were selected to match the number of men who signed the Easter 1916 Proclamation of the Republic. The group consisted of IRA members Brendan Hughes, Tommy McKearney, Raymond McCartney, Tom McFeeley, Sean McKenna, Leo Green, and INLA member John Nixon. This hunger strike ended a week before Christmas. In January 1981, it became clear that the prisoners' demands had not been conceded. Prison authorities began to supply the prisoners with officially issued civilian clothing, whereas the prisoners demanded the right to wear their own clothing. In addition, the militancy of INLA blanket men, who were refusing to withdraw from the protest, was causing problems. On 27 January INLA prisoners rioted because the INLA Officer Commanding Patsy O'Hara was not permitted by the authorities to see his own men. The stage was set for another confrontation and in March the 1981 Irish hunger strike began. Three INLA members died during the latter hunger strike – Patsy O'Hara, Kevin Lynch, and Michael Devine, along with seven Provisional IRA members. The hunger strike leader Bobby Sands and Anti H-Block activist Owen Carron were elected to the British Parliament, and two other protesting prisoners were elected to the Dáil. In addition, there were work stoppages and large demonstrations all over Ireland in sympathy with the hunger strikers. It was reported the turnout for Patsy O'Hara's funeral was equal to that of Bloody Sunday.

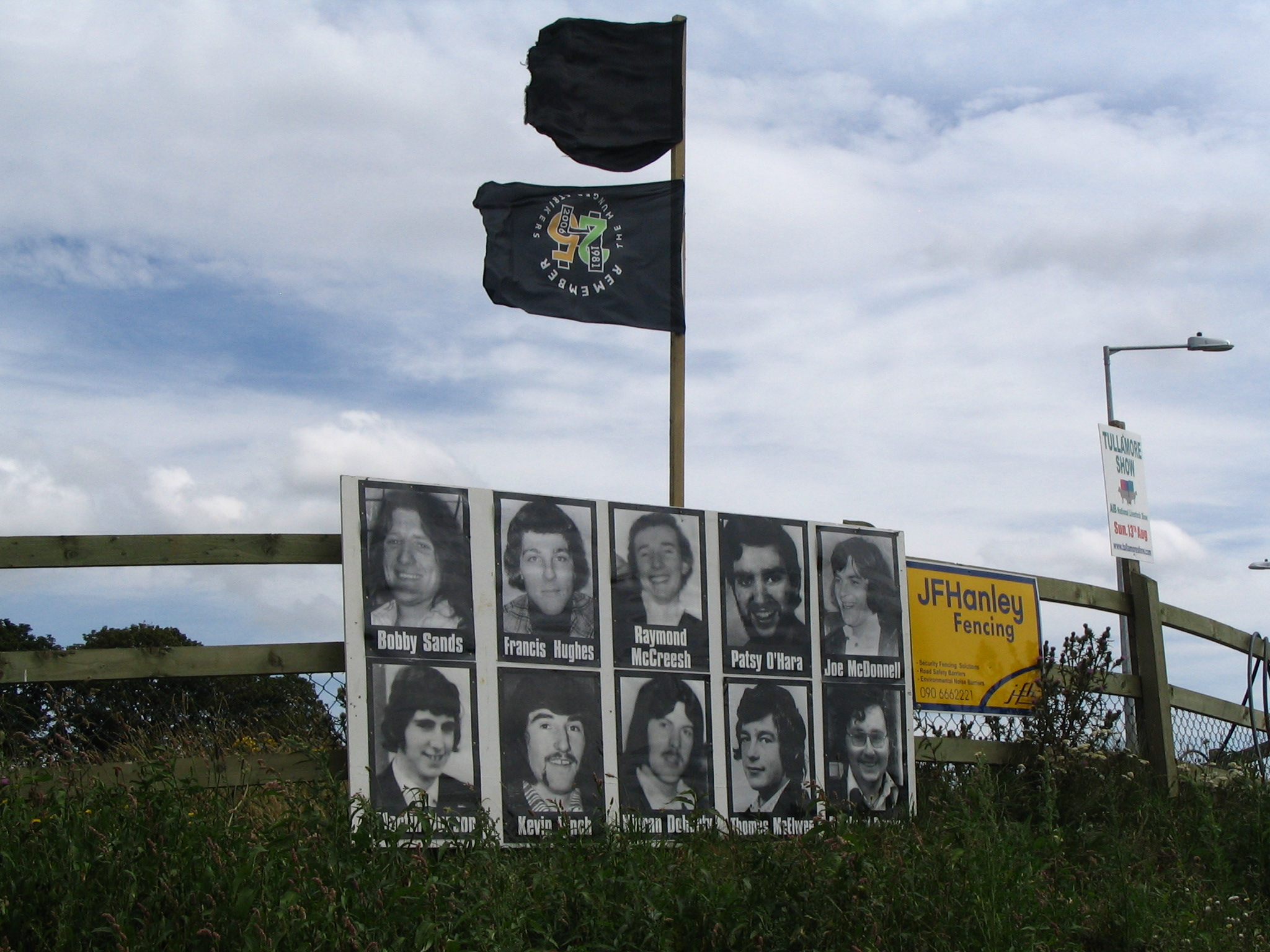
A commemoration on the 25th anniversary of the hunger strike

There was a bitter clash over the IRSP's share of money raised in an American fund-raising tour undertaken by three of the hunger-strikers' relatives, Liz O'Hara, Malachy McCreesh, and Seán Sands. The tour had been organised by Noraid, the Provisional IRA's support group in the United States. Noraid had objected to O'Hara being on the tour because her brother Patsy was a "communist" and would sully the image republicans had in the United States. However, the other relatives refused to go unless she accompanied them. There were disputes over the exact amount of money raised but the only certainty is INLA prisoners received none of it. IRSP member Seán Flynn travelled to New York where he met Martin Galvin, a leading Noraid spokesman. The meeting devolved into a shouting match with Galvin denouncing Flynn as a communist and having him thrown out of the house. Flynn toured the United States as a representative of the H-Block committee but Noraid was told to stay away from any meeting he was speaking at. A wealthy Noraid supporter who did attend a meeting was so disgusted by Flynn's sympathy for Native Americans and African Americans that he tore up a previously promised cheque for $10,000. He allegedly told Flynn "I don't like niggers".

The hunger strikes brought new recruits into the INLA, young men from Catholic ghettos attracted by the group's left-wing rhetoric. The INLA, less disciplined and hierarchal than the IRA, offered more opportunities for immediate action. For the first time the INLA rivalled the Provisional IRA in Belfast in terms of military activity, carrying out frequent attacks on British security forces. The INLA unit which operated in the Lower Falls area of Belfast, led by Gerard Steenson, were particularly active at this time. However, the Belfast INLA was increasingly at odds with the Dublin leadership for personal and political reasons. By the beginning of 1982, this faction had shot and wounded the INLA's northern organiser Jackie Goodman, IRSP Belfast city councillor Sean Flynn and Flynn's brother Harry Flynn, hiding out in Dublin after escaping from the Maze prison in 1976. Steenson's faction claimed they were the true INLA. In response, the old Dublin INLA leadership declared they be shot on sight.

=== Dominic McGlinchey ===
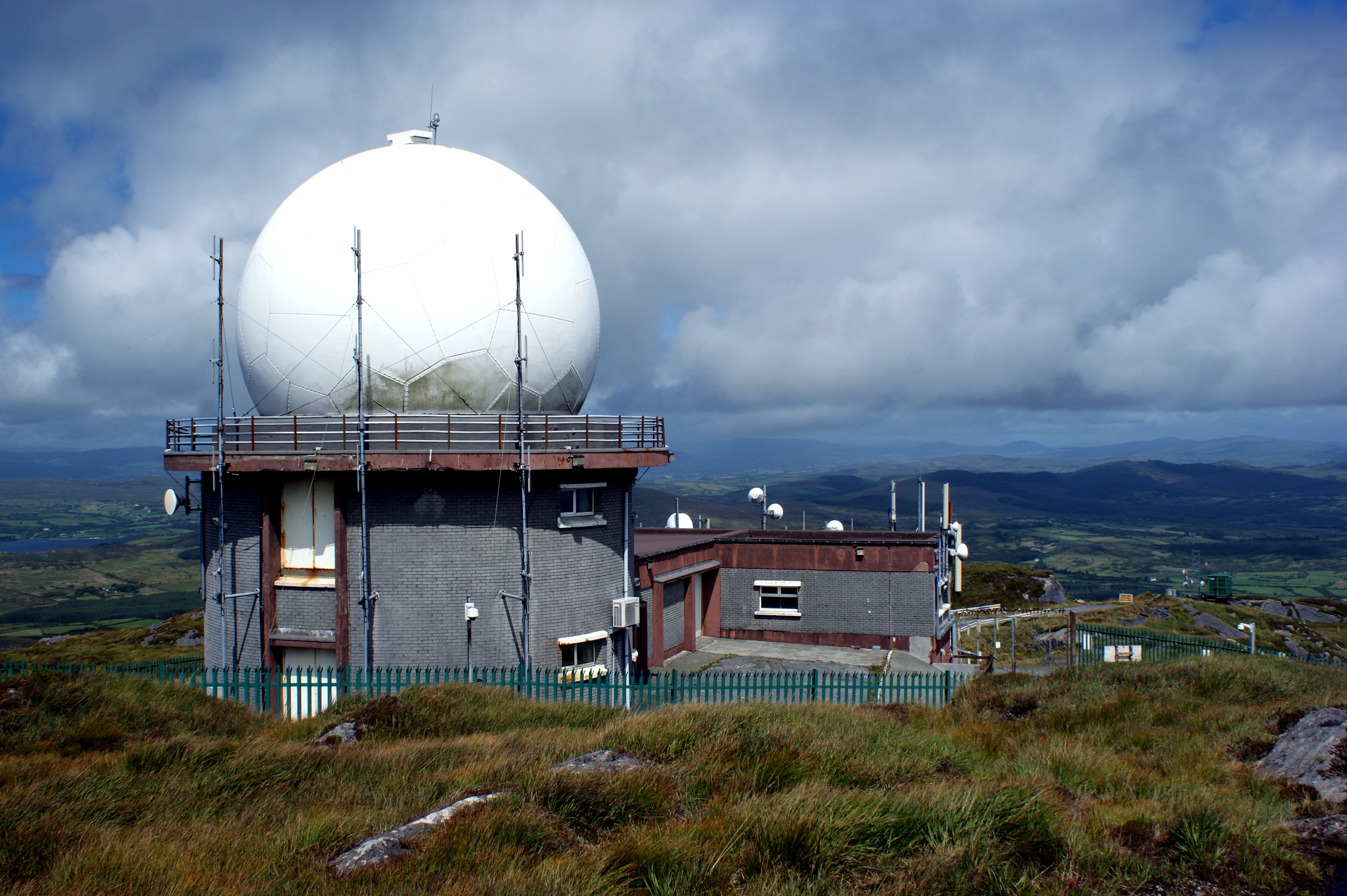
The radar station at Mount Gabriel was bombed by the INLA in September 1982, who claimed it was providing assistance to NATO

In summer 1982 in a "rare moment of tactical expediency" what was left of the INLA's Belfast leadership, a group with close contacts with the Lower Falls gang, patched up their differences with the old INLA leadership and agreed on the composition of a new army council, chief of staff and Belfast commander. In early 1982 IRA veteran Dominic McGlinchey was released from Portlaoise Prison having served five years. McGlinchey had defected to the INLA in prison and after he was freed quickly rose up the ranks to become director of operations. He made an immediate impact, ruthlessly putting an end to dissent within the organisation and recruiting new members. Based in the Dundalk area, McGlinchey began to organise the INLA in Armagh, Newry, Tyrone, South Londonderry, and South West Antrim. His release coincided with the theft of 1,000 lb (450 kg) of Frangex commercial explosives from the Tara mines in County Tipperary, enabling the organisation to carry out an "intensive" bombing campaign. Throughout 1982 the INLA stepped up its attacks on Unionist leaders with a swathe of bomb attacks on their homes and offices. Attacks against British security forces continued also, but a number of operations killed Catholic children, with three dying in Belfast as a result of INLA explosions in a five-month period. These were propaganda disasters for the INLA, and, say authors Holland and McDonald, "gave the INLA a reputation for recklessness". Other offensive INLA actions at this time included the bombing of the Mount Gabriel radar station in County Cork, which the INLA believed was providing assistance to the North Atlantic Treaty Organisation in violation of Irish neutrality, although this was disputed by the Irish government. Their deadliest attack came on 6 December 1982 – the Ballykelly disco bombing of the Droppin' Well Bar in Ballykelly, County Londonderry, which catered to British military personnel, in which 11 soldiers on leave and 6 civilians were killed. Shortly afterwards, the INLA issued a statement of responsibility:

We believe that it is only attacks of such a nature that bring it home to people in Britain and the British establishment. The shooting of an individual soldier, for the people of Britain, has very little effect in terms of the media or in terms of the British administration.

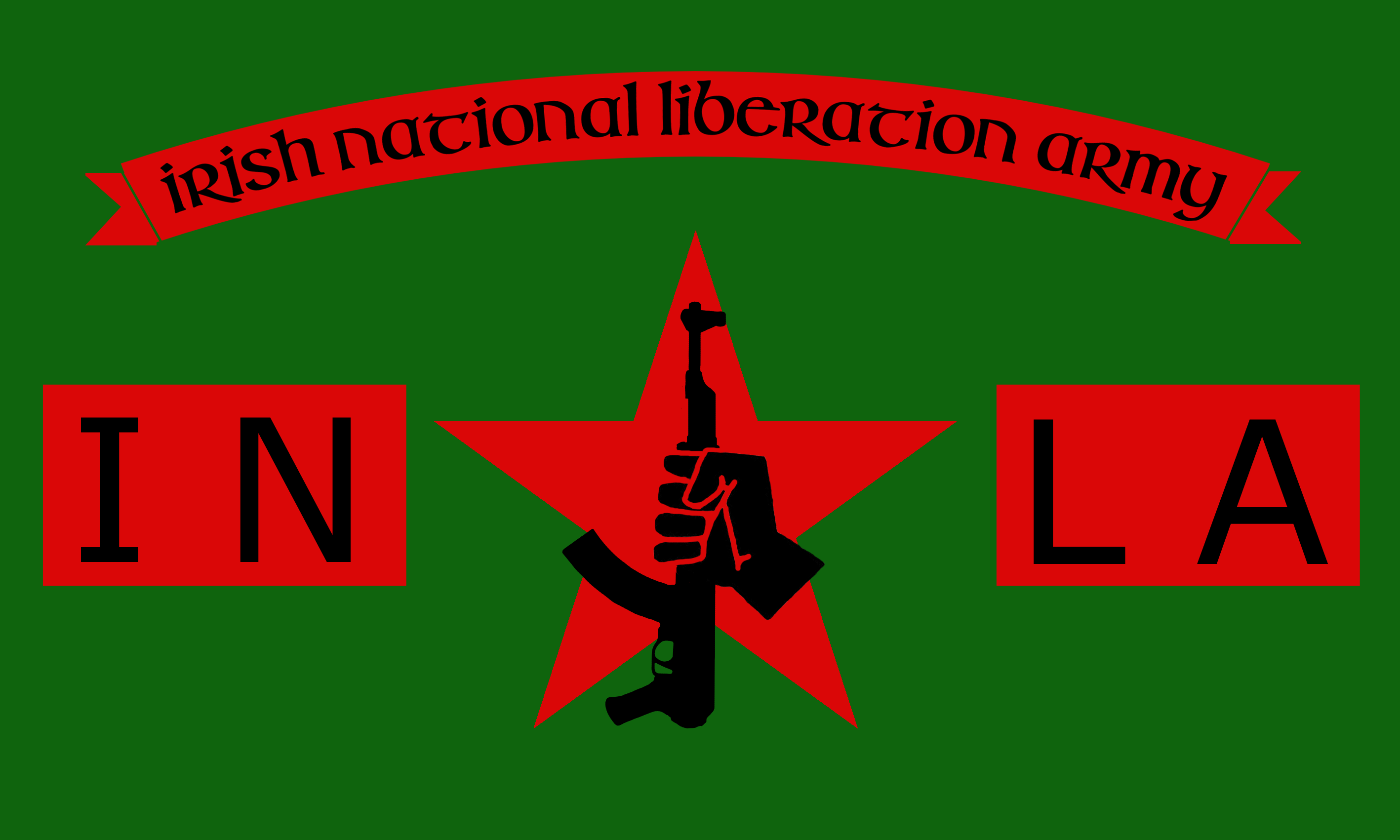
Flag several regional brigades of the INLA began using during the 1980s

On 20 November 1983, three members of the congregation in the Mountain Lodge Pentecostal Church, Darkley, (near Keady, County Armagh) were shot dead during a Sunday service. The attack was claimed by the Catholic Reaction Force, a cover name for a small group of people, including one member of the INLA. The weapon used came from an INLA arms dump, but Tim Pat Coogan claims in his book The IRA that the weapon had been given to the INLA member to assassinate a known loyalist and the attack on the church was not sanctioned. The INLA's then-chief of staff, Dominic McGlinchey, came out of hiding to condemn the attack.

On 17 March 1984, Dominic McGlinchey and three other INLA members were surrounded by armed Garda detectives at a safe house in Newmarket-on-Fergus, County Clare. Over one hundred bullets were exchanged in a shootout before Gardai of the Special Branch task force made their way into the farmhouse, subsequently causing McGlinchey to call for a priest in surrender. On going into jail McGlinchey handed over his position as Chief of Staff to a Newry ally; the INLA Army Council was not consulted on this decision.

=== Supergrass ===
In the mid-1980s, the INLA was greatly weakened by splits and criminality within its own ranks, as well as the conviction of many of its members under the supergrass scheme. Harry Kirkpatrick, an INLA volunteer, was arrested in February 1983 on charges of five murders and subsequently agreed to give evidence against other INLA members.

The INLA kidnapped Kirkpatrick's wife Elizabeth, and later kidnapped his sister and his stepfather too. All were released physically unharmed. INLA Chief of Staff Dominic McGlinchey is alleged to have killed Kirkpatrick's lifelong friend Gerard 'Sparky' Barkley because he may have revealed the whereabouts of the Kirkpatrick family members to the police.

In May 1983, 10 men were charged with various offences on the basis of evidence from Kirkpatrick. Those charged included IRSP vice-chairman Kevin McQuillan and former councillor Sean Flynn. IRSP chairman and INLA member James Brown was charged with the murder of a police officer. Others escaped; Jim Barr, an IRSP member named by Kirkpatrick as part of the INLA, fled to the US where, having spent 17 months in jail, he won political asylum in 1993.)

In December 1985, 27 people were convicted on the basis of Kirkpatrick's statements. By December 1986, 24 of those convictions had been overturned. Gerard Steenson was given five life sentences for the deaths of the same five people that Kirkpatrick himself had been convicted of, these included Ulster Defence Regiment soldier Colin Quinn, shot in Belfast in December 1980.

Holland and McDonald summarise the impact the supergrass trials had on the INLA:

The impact on the INLA had been devastating. Though many of its most active volunteers were incarcerated for several years, this proved not to be the most serious impact the supergrass trials and their aftermath had on the organisation. For more important was the suspicion and bitterness within the organisation that was planted during those years. It would soon grow to deadly proportions.

=== Feuds and splits ===
Holland and McDonald argue the "frenzy of activity generated under the rule of Dominic McGlinchey" had "masked the seriousness of the situation facing the IRSP and INLA. By 1984 the movement had "degenerated into a loosely knit group of often mutually suspicious fiefdoms." The IRSP took a more rigidly Marxist/Leninist line than that ever previously adopted by the movement in an attempt to delineate the IRSP/INLA more clearly from the Sinn Féin and the Provisional IRA. The adoption of this rigid line meant the effective abandonment of the broad front strategy as initially conceived by Seamus Costello. Widespread criminality and ruthless racketeering by the INLA in Belfast after the imprisonment of key activists following the supergrass trials brought the movement into further disrepute and the INLA leadership moved against the new Officer Commanding (OC) of the Belfast INLA. The INLA carried out a number of bomb attacks in 1985 but the INLA was more concerned with the internal battle for control of the disintegrating organisation. John O'Reilly, former OC of the Markets area of Belfast, emerged as the winner and usurped the Dundalk man McGlinchey had appointed to become chief of staff. John O'Reilly was regarded with suspicion by some within the INLA, he was dismissed from the organisation by Ronnie Bunting in the late 1970s after an internal inquiry into allegations of O'Reilly being a police informant.

In jail, the INLA began to break up into warring factions. By late 1984 they could be divided into three broad groupings; one centred around Gerard Steenson, a second that opposed him, and a third that associated with Tom McAllister. Steenson's men, who included Jimmy Brown, were angry and disillusioned at the way the INLA had developed since their arrest. Incidents such as the Darkley killings and the police penetration and corruption in Belfast convinced them that the INLA was beyond reform. Those opposed to Steenson were the de facto INLA leadership including Ta Power and John O'Reilly. Their priority was to preserve the INLA as an organisation. McAllister at first leaned towards O'Reilly but later veered towards those opposed to him.

O'Reilly saw the remnants of the original INLA organisation based in Dublin and Munster as a threat to his legitimacy as chief of staff. Harry Flynn and Gerry Roche were released from Portlaoise Prison in 1984 and set about trying to reconstruct the organisation founded by Costello. Gerry Roche won an agreement by a very narrow majority, on the Ard Comhairle of the lRSP to publish a newspaper. He wanted to call the paper "The Broad Front" and although permission was not granted he went ahead anyway, calling the paper "Freedom Struggle". In the editorial in the first and only issue, Flynn made reference to the tradition of Connolly, Mellowes and Costello but no mention was made of Marx, Engels or Lenin; this was viewed as a reflection of his disagreement with the new Marxist/Leninist line. In response, the O'Reilly faction tried to assassinate both Flynn and Roche. The old arms links were re-activated by the Dublin-Munster grouping as part of an effort to either create a new republican socialist movement or reform the existing INLA; between 1984 and late 1986 they held meetings with Al-Fatah and other Arab sympathisers in Prague, East Berlin, Warsaw, and Tunisia. In 1984 guns started coming into Ireland in modest amounts; Škorpion machine pistols, VZOR pistols, and grenades were smuggled, as well as some "remotes" for bomb detonators. Seamus Ruddy from Newry joined the INLA in Dublin in the 1970s. He was arrested in 1978 for smuggling arms but was acquitted. After dissension among local members, Ruddy drifted away from the main organisation and in 1983 went to Paris where he taught English. He disappeared in late May 1985, after a meeting with three leading members of the INLA, one of them being John O'Reilly. The three were searching for arms and believed that Ruddy knew where they could be found. At the time, the INLA denied that it was involved with his disappearance and resisted pressure from the Ruddy family to help it locate his whereabouts. In late 1993, a former high-ranking member of the INLA, Peter Stewart, finally admitted that the INLA had killed Ruddy in Paris. Ruddy's remains were found there in 2017.

In 1987, the INLA and its political wing, the IRSP came under attack from the Irish People's Liberation Organisation (IPLO), an organisation founded by disaffected INLA members centred around Tom McAllister, Gerard Steenson, Jimmy Brown and Martin "Rook" O'Prey who had resigned or been expelled from the INLA. The IPLO's initial aim was to destroy the INLA and replace it with their organisation. Five members of the INLA were killed by the IPLO, including leaders Ta Power and John O'Reilly. The INLA retaliated with several killings of their own. After the INLA killed the IPLO's leader, Gerard Steenson in 1987, a truce was reached. Although severely damaged by the IPLO's attacks, the INLA continued to exist. The IPLO, which was heavily involved in drug dealing, was forcibly disbanded by the Provisional IRA in a large-scale operation in 1992.

Directly after the feud in October 1987, the INLA received more damaging publicity when Dessie O'Hare, an erstwhile INLA volunteer, set up his own group called the "Irish Revolutionary Brigade" and kidnapped a Dublin dentist named John O'Grady. O'Hare cut off two of O'Grady's fingers and sent them to his family in order to secure a ransom. O'Grady was eventually rescued and O'Hare's group arrested after several shootouts with armed Gardaí. The INLA disassociated itself from the action, issuing a statement saying O'Hare "is not a member of the INLA". O'Hare later rejoined the INLA while in prison.

Following the feud the IRSP embraced a more explicitly left-wing ideological stance; declaring in the December 1987 issue of the Starry Plough the necessity to "break away from Left Republicanism and embrace the scientific socialism of Marx and Engels in order to analyse and thus formulate a political programme for the Irish revolution" and move beyond "republicanism/militarism." The politically minded faction within the movement hoped to build a left-republican alternative to Sinn Féin. However, militarist elements within the INLA were intent on a renewed armed campaign against British security forces and loyalists. A protracted internal power struggle ensued and in 1992 the main political spokespersons for the IRSP departed. In the early 1990s the INLA, particularly in Belfast, effectively became a proxy force for the Provisional IRA, carrying out attacks on loyalist paramilitaries using IRA intelligence. Many shootings were perceived as openly sectarian attacks on Protestants.

On 14 April 1992, the INLA carried out its first killing in England after the death of Airey Neave, when they shot dead a recruiting army sergeant in Derby while he was leaving a British Army recruiting office. In June 2010, Declan Duffy was charged with the killing, although he was released in March 2013, under the terms of the 1998 Good Friday Agreement.

Dominic McGlinchey was killed in 1994 by unknown assailants after being released from prison the previous year.

On 16 June 1994 the INLA's Belfast Brigade shot dead three members of the Ulster Volunteer Force (UVF); high-ranking UVF Belfast Brigade figure Trevor King and two other UVF members, on the Shankill Road in west Belfast, close to the Belfast headquarters of the UVF.

In 1995, four members of the INLA, including chief of staff Hugh Torney, were arrested by Gardaí in Balbriggan while trying to smuggle weapons from Dublin to Belfast. Torney, with the support of two of his co-accused, called a ceasefire in exchange for favourable treatment by the Irish Government. Since Torney, who was chief of staff, under the INLA's rules lacked the authority to call a ceasefire (because he was incarcerated), he and the two men who supported him were expelled from the INLA.

Torney and one of those men, Dessie McCleery, as well as founder-member John Fennell, did not wish to surrender the leadership of the organisation. Their faction, known as the INLA/GHQ, assassinated the new INLA chief of staff, Gino Gallagher. After the INLA killed both McCleery and Torney in 1996, the rest of Torney's faction quietly disbanded.

INLA gunmen opened fire on British soldiers in the Ardoyne area of North Belfast on 7 July 1997, when the Drumcree conflict triggered six days of fierce riots and widespread violence in several nationalist areas of Northern Ireland.

=== Killing of Billy Wright ===
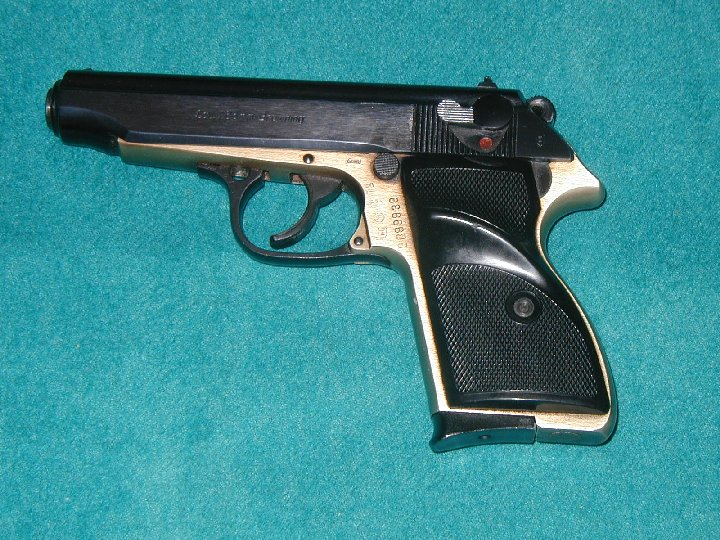
A FEG PA-63 semi-automatic pistol, of the kind used to kill Wright

Billy Wright was the founder and leader of the Loyalist Volunteer Force (LVF). Since July 1996, the group had launched a string of attacks on Catholic civilians, killing at least five. In April 1997, Wright was sentenced to eight years in the Maze Prison. On the morning of 27 December 1997, he was assassinated by three INLA prisoners – Christopher "Crip" McWilliams, John "Sonny" Glennon and John Kennaway – who were armed with two pistols. He was shot as he travelled in a prison van (alongside another LVF prisoner, Norman Green and one prison officer) from one part of the prison to another. Kennaway held the driver hostage and Glennon gave cover with a .22 Derringer pistol while McWilliams opened the side door and fired seven shots at Wright with his PA63 semi-automatic. After killing Wright, the three volunteers handed themselves over to prison guards. They also handed over a statement, which read:

"Billy Wright was executed for one reason and one reason only, and that was for directing and waging his campaign of terror against the nationalist people from his prison cell in Long Kesh.

That night, LVF gunmen opened fire on a disco in a mainly nationalist area of Dungannon. Four civilians were wounded and a former Provisional IRA volunteer was killed in the attack.

The nature of Wright's killing led to speculation that prison authorities colluded with the INLA to have him killed, as he was a danger to the peace process. The INLA strongly denied these rumours, and published a detailed account of the assassination in the March/April 1999 issue of The Starry Plough newspaper.

=== Ceasefire ===
The INLA opposed the 1998 Good Friday Agreement and continued to carry out attacks during the talks process that preceded the agreement and the confirmatory referendum that followed. The INLA claimed responsibility for a car bomb which exploded on 24 June in the Armagh border village of Newtownhamilton. The bombing was interpreted as a "protest attack" as it happened the day before the election for the new Northern Ireland Assembly that took place on 25 June 1998. The RUC believed the Real IRA supplied the INLA with semtex commercial explosive which was thought to have been used as a component in making the bomb. INLA members assisted the bombing campaign being carried out by the dissident republican groups the Continuity Irish Republican Army (CIRA) and Real Irish Republican Army (RIRA) by providing stolen cars that could be transformed into car bombs. On 15 August 1998 the RIRA exploded a car bomb in the centre of Omagh, County Tyrone killing 29 people and injuring 220 others, in what became the deadliest attack of the Troubles inside Northern Ireland.

The INLA declared a ceasefire on 22 August 1998. When calling its ceasefire, the INLA acknowledged the "faults and grievous errors in our prosecution of the war". The INLA admitted that innocent people had been killed and injured "and at times our actions as a liberation army fell far short of what they should have been". The INLA went on to accept the large vote in favour of the Good Friday Agreement – which it had opposed during the 1998 referendums – by the people of both parts of Ireland. It said "The will of the Irish people is clear. It is now time to silence the guns and allow the working classes the time and the opportunity to advance their demands and their needs."

Although the INLA does not support the Good Friday Agreement, it does not call for a return to armed struggle on behalf of republicans either. An INLA statement released in 1999 declared, "we do not see a return to armed struggle as a viable option at the present time".

=== Post-ceasefire activities ===
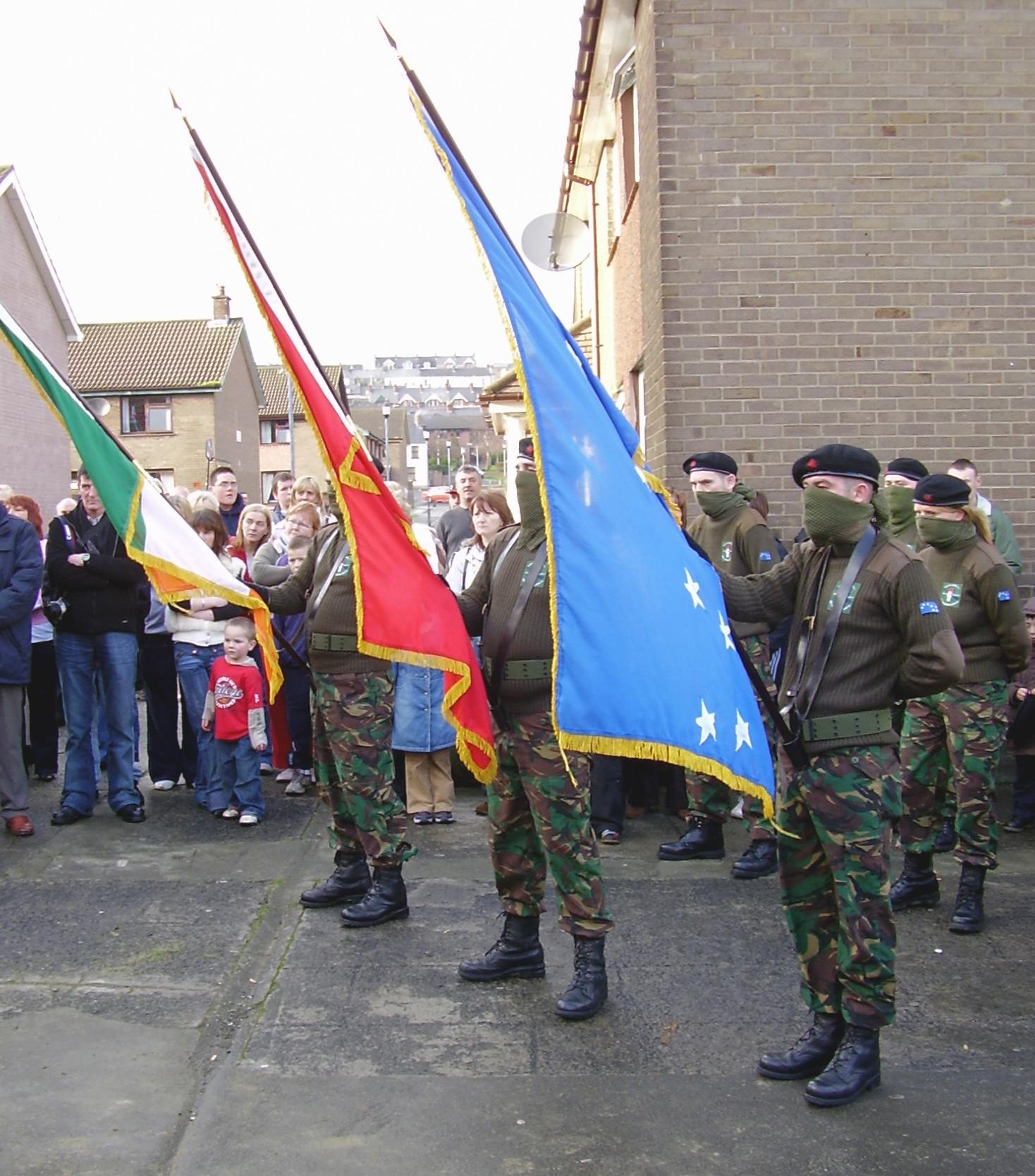
INLA volunteers carrying a flag of Ireland, a red flag and a Starry Plough flag in the Bogside area of Derry (2005)

The INLA maintains a presence in parts of Northern Ireland and has carried out punishment beatings on alleged petty criminals.

The Independent Monitoring Commission (IMC), which monitored paramilitary activity in Northern Ireland, stated in a November 2004 report that the INLA was heavily involved in criminality. In 1997, an INLA man named John Morris was shot dead by Garda Síochána (the Republic's police force) in Dublin during the attempted robbery of a newspaper distributor's depot in Inchicore. Three other INLA members were arrested in the incident. In 1999, the INLA in Dublin became involved in a feud with a criminal gang in the city. After a young INLA man named Patrick Campbell was killed by drug dealers, the INLA carried out several shootings in reprisal, including at least one killing. Journalist Paul Williams has also stated the INLA, especially in Dublin, is now primarily a front for organised crime. The IRSP and INLA deny these allegations, arguing that no one has been simultaneously convicted of membership in the INLA and of drug offences. The IRSP and the INLA have both strongly denied any involvement with drug dealing, stating that the INLA has threatened criminals who it stated have falsely used its name.

The October 2006 IMC report stated that the INLA "was not capable of undertaking a sustained campaign [against the United Kingdom], nor does it aspire to".

In December 2007, disturbances broke out at an INLA parade in the Bogside in Derry between spectators and Police Service of Northern Ireland (PSNI) officers attempting to arrest four of the marchers.

In the Seventeenth and Eighteenth IMC reports the INLA was said to remain a threat, with a desire to mount attacks that could well be more dangerous in the future, but was characterized as being largely a criminal enterprise at that time. The INLA killed Brian McGlynn on 3 June 2007 during the span of the first of these reports. This killing was said to have occurred because the victim used the INLA name in the drug trade. On 24 June 2008, the INLA was said to have murdered Emmett Shiels, although the IMC report did indicate the investigation was continuing. It was also said to be partaking in "serious crimes" such as drug dealing, extortion, robbery, fuel laundering and smuggling. Furthermore, the INLA and Continuity IRA were stated to have co-operated.

On 15 February 2009 the INLA claimed responsibility for the shooting death of Derry drug dealer Jim McConnell.

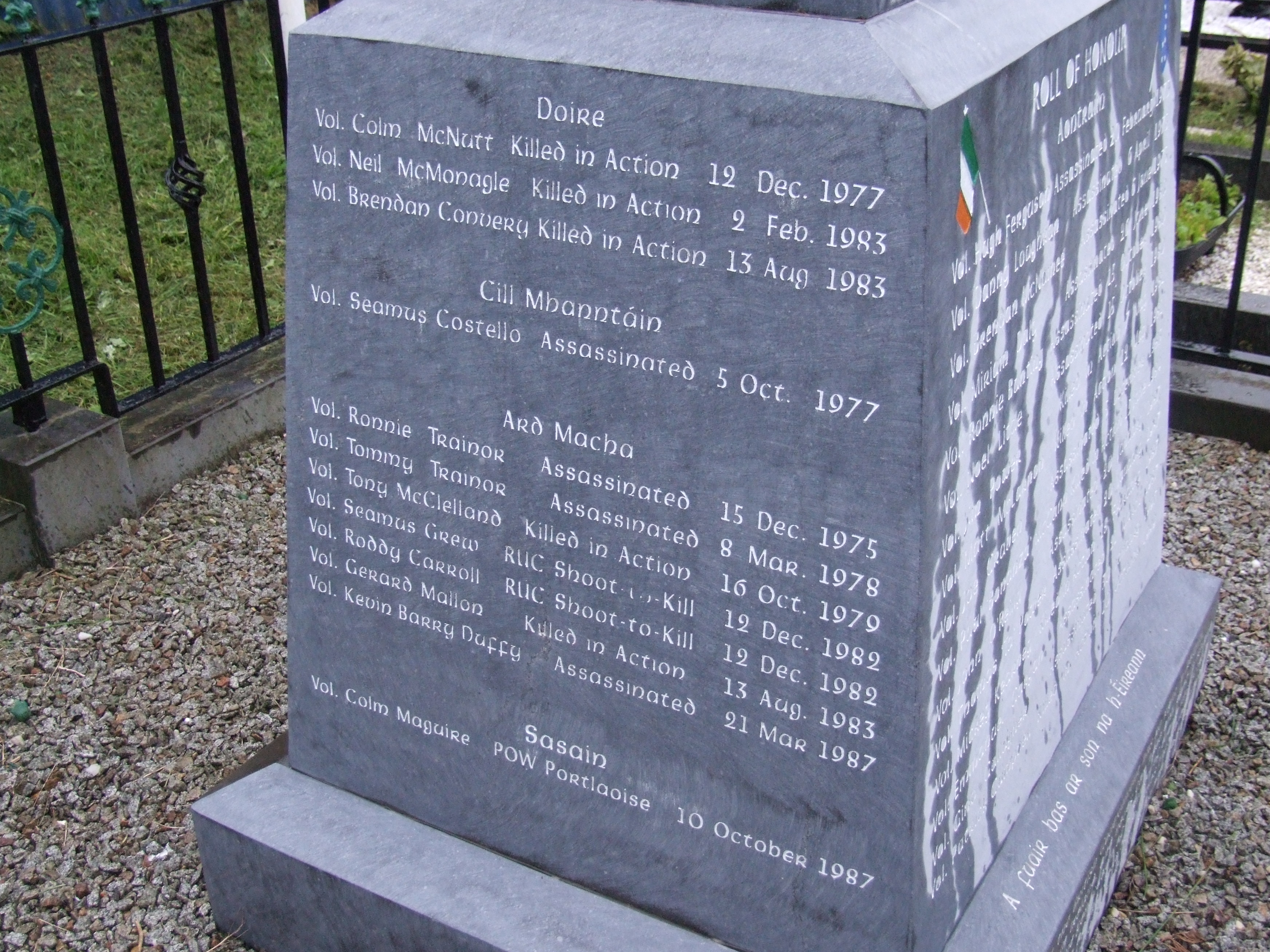
An INLA memorial in Milltown Cemetery, Belfast

In March 2009 it was reported that the INLA had stood down its Dublin Brigade in order to allow its army council to carry out an internal investigation into allegations of drug dealing and criminality. The INLA denied it as an organisation was involved in drug dealing and went on to say that "As a result of evidence presented to us, we are investigating the activities of people associated with us in [Dublin]. Pending that outcome, we have stood down several people." A short time later the INLA's Dublin Commander, Declan "Whacker" Duffy, publicly disassociated himself from the organisation. Duffy criticized the INLA leadership stating that "You would imagine if there was a thorough investigation being carried out by the INLA they would have at least came and spoke to me." He went on to state that: "I can't deny that I'm disappointed with the way the INLA has handled things but at the same time I'm not going to get into a sniping match with them."

On 19 August 2009, the INLA shot and wounded a man in Derry. The INLA claimed that the man was involved in drug dealing although the injured man and his family denied the allegation. However, in a newspaper article on 28 August the victim retracted his previous statement and admitted that he had been involved in small scale drug dealing but has since ceased these activities.

In October 2015 the Assessment on Paramilitary Groups in Northern Ireland, commissioned by the Secretary of State for Northern Ireland on the structure, role and purpose of paramilitary organisations reported the structures of the INLA remain in existence but there is little indication of centralised control from the leadership. Some members are active in politics through the IRSP however INLA members are "heavily involved" in criminal activity including extortion, drug dealing, distribution of stolen goods, and fraud. The INLA also continues to carry out punishment attacks. Although the INLA's leadership recognises the futility of a return to armed struggle, there is cooperation between INLA members and dissident republicans, including the provision of weaponry and "paramilitary-style assaults."

In July 2024, A Belfast Councillor for the TUV accused the INLA of attacking the Welcome Organisation, a homeless charity in West Belfast, following graffiti painted nearby stating any workmen repairing the centre would be shot. It is unknown how true this claim is, as local residents have been vocal about their demands for the centre to be relocated due to anti-social behaviour (primarily street fights, drug abuse and sexual acts in public). Following the attack, the IRSP reiterated calls for its relocation to a more suitable location.

=== End of armed campaign ===
On 11 October 2009, speaking at the graveside of its founder Seamus Costello in Bray, the INLA formally announced an end to its armed campaign, stating the current political framework allowed for the pursuit of its goals through peaceful, democratic means. Martin McMonagle from Derry said: "The Republican Socialist Movement has been informed by the INLA that following a process of serious debate ... it has concluded that the armed struggle is over. The objective of a 32-county socialist republic will be best achieved through exclusively peaceful political struggle".

The governments of Britain and Ireland were informed before the announcement. Sinn Féin's Gerry Adams was doubtful but added: "However, if it is followed by the actions that are necessary, this is a welcome development". On 6 February 2010, days before the Independent International Commission on Decommissioning (IICD) was due to disband, the INLA revealed that it had decommissioned its weapons over the preceding few weeks. Had the INLA retained its weapons beyond 9 February, the date on which the legislation under which the IICD operated ended, then they would have been treated as belonging to common criminals rather than remnants from the Troubles.

The decommissioning was confirmed by General John de Chastelain of the IICD on 8 February 2010. On the same day INLA spokesman Martin McMonagle said that the INLA made "no apology for [its] part in the conflict" but they believed in the "primacy of politics" to "advance the working class struggle in Ireland".

== Chiefs of staff ==
Name	Assumed position	Left position	Source
Seamus Costello	1974	July 1976	
John "Eddy" McNichol	July 1976	1977	
Frank Gallagher	1977	1978	
John O'Doherty	1978	1980	
Unnamed associate of Seamus Costello	1980	?	
Unnamed agreed chief of staff	1982	June 1983	
Dominic McGlinchey	June 1983	1984	
"Jap"	1984	1985	
John O'Reilly	1985	20 January 1987	
Hugh Torney	1987	1995	
Gino Gallagher	1995	1996	

== Finance ==
In 2002, the Northern Ireland Affairs Select Committee estimated the INLA's annual running costs at £25-30,000 against an annual fundraising capability of £500,000.

== Arms importation ==
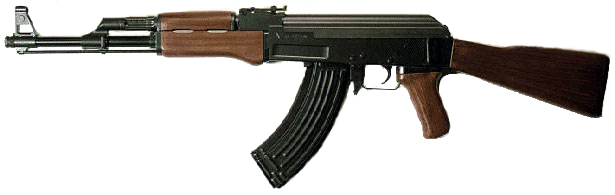
AK-47

Obtaining arms was one of the greatest difficulties faced by the INLA in its early years. Their avowed Marxism made them beyond help from Catholic Irish-America, who had traditionally been a lifeline for funds and weapons for Irish republicans engaged in armed struggle against British rule in Ireland. Lack of weapons in the mid-Seventies led to numerous internal rows, and Costello himself was even threatened by INLA members for his failure to provide guns. At a time when the IRA seemed replete with Armalites, the INLA was mainly armed with shotguns, which the rank and file wryly took to calling "Costello-ites" after their leader. The INLA's main source of arms early on was from sympathizers in the Middle East, from where they imported a contingent of AK-pattern rifles in 1978. An arms smuggling network was later established where guns would be channelled from a Palestinian source based in Lebanon via West Germany (and later Switzerland) to a left-wing sympathiser in France and then to Ireland. The first shipment arrived in July 1979 consisting of six FN pistols, 35 automatic pistols, and 4 Uzi submachine guns. In later years Palestinian sources would provide the INLA with hundreds of Czechoslovak VZOR pistols as well as Chinese-made SKS rifles, Rhodesian submachine-guns and Browning pistols. The INLA also acquired Škorpion machine pistols from Fatah free of charge. The INLA also acquired Soviet-made plastic explosives, which were used in the assassination of Airey Neave. Later smaller-scale arms smuggling was carried out through a new conduit linked to the French far-left terrorist group Action Directe. This new network was established by the INLA faction loyal to Gerard Steenson, the original Middle East arms route remained in the hands of the older Dublin-based leadership. In July 1983 INLA member Colm Murphy was arrested in the US after attempting to buy a consignment of M60 machine guns to be shipped to Ireland. Testifying in court, informer Harry Kirkpatrick later recounted how the INLA faction in Belfast under the leadership of Gerard Steenson had during the 1981 Hunger Strike independently purchased arms in the United States, using money acquired from an armed robbery.

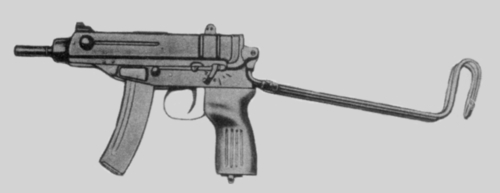
Škorpion vz. 61

By the mid-1980s, separate INLA factions were trying to acquire arms. The old arms links were re-activated by remnants of the original INLA organisation based in Dublin and Munster as part of an effort to either create a new republican socialist movement or reform the existing INLA. Between 1984 and late 1986 they held meetings with Fatah and other Arab sympathisers in Prague, East Berlin, Warsaw, and Tunisia. In 1984, a modest amount of arms started flowing into Ireland again, including Škorpion machine pistols and VZOR pistols; grenades were smuggled as well, as were remotes for bomb detonators. The 1986 United States bombing of Libya generated an anti-Western mood in the Arab world that led to a breakthrough for INLA arms procurement efforts. A large arms haul was secured through a Palestine Liberation Organization contact in Prague which included a hundred man-portable anti-tank weapons, forty AK-47 rifles, three 12.7mm heavy machine guns, and two 80mm mortars. However, four INLA members (amongst them Harry Flynn) were arrested in France as they prepared to receive the shipment. The judge at their trial was sympathetic and recognised they were acting on political motives. By 1988 though the weapons were still available for import neither the INLA nor the IPLO splinter group had the means to do so.

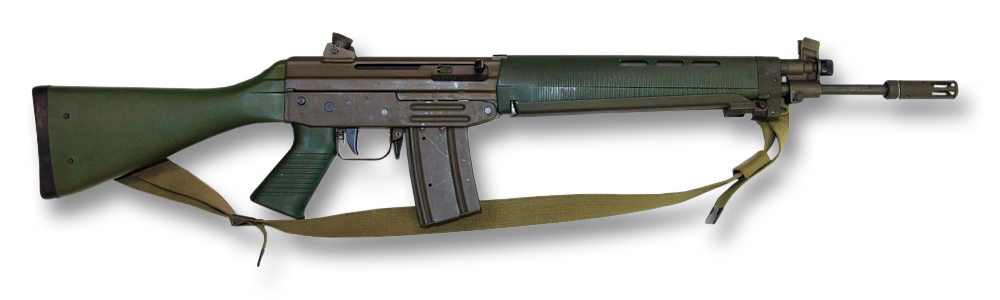
SIG SG 540

In the mid-1980s the INLA also came into possession of Finnish RK62 assault rifles, as well as a number of Swiss SIG SG 540 assault rifles. These weapons were used in several attacks by the INLA in this period.

Between 1977 and 1983 the INLA received weaponry from a sympathiser in Australia. The network had been activated by Seamus Costello and consisted of shipments of rifles of several types; Ruger Mini-14s, a Springfield Armory M1A, M1 Garands, Egyptian Mauser rifles and SKS rifles. In late 1983, however, the Australian network was exposed after Gardaí found Seamus Ruddy in possession of a document that led to the discovery of the fourth (and last) Australian guns shipment which contained five M14-type rifles, one M1 Garand, three Mini-14's, an SKS, and over 1,700 rounds of ammunition. An Irish immigrant who had lived in Australia since 1968 and had become an Australian citizen in 1973 was arrested and convicted of arms running in 1984.

In the summer of 1994 the INLA smuggled a quantity of explosives from New Zealand, hidden in tea chests.

== Deaths as a result of activity ==
According to Malcolm Sutton's Index of Deaths from the Conflict in Ireland, part of the Conflict Archive on the Internet (CAIN), the INLA was responsible for at least 120 killings during the Troubles, between 1975 and 2001. This includes those claimed by the "People's Liberation Army" and "People's Republican Army". According to the book Lost Lives (2006 edition), the INLA was responsible for 127 killings.

Of those killed by the INLA:

- 48 (~38%) were members or former members of the British security forces, including:
  - 26 British military personnel and 2 former soldiers
  - 14 Royal Ulster Constabulary officers and 4 former officers
  - 2 Northern Ireland Prison Service officers
- 44 (~36%) were civilians – including politicians, alleged informers and alleged criminals
- 20 (~16%) were members or former members of republican paramilitary groups
- 8 (~6%) were members or former members of loyalist paramilitary groups
- 2 were members of the Irish security forces

The CAIN database says there were 39 INLA members killed during the conflict, while Lost Lives says there were 44 killed.
