= Divis Tower =

Residential tower in Belfast

Coordinates: 54.6000°N 5.9422°W

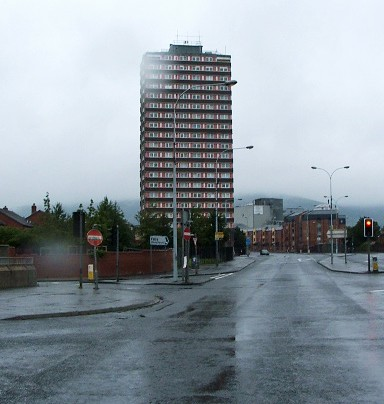
Divis Tower, Belfast, 2004

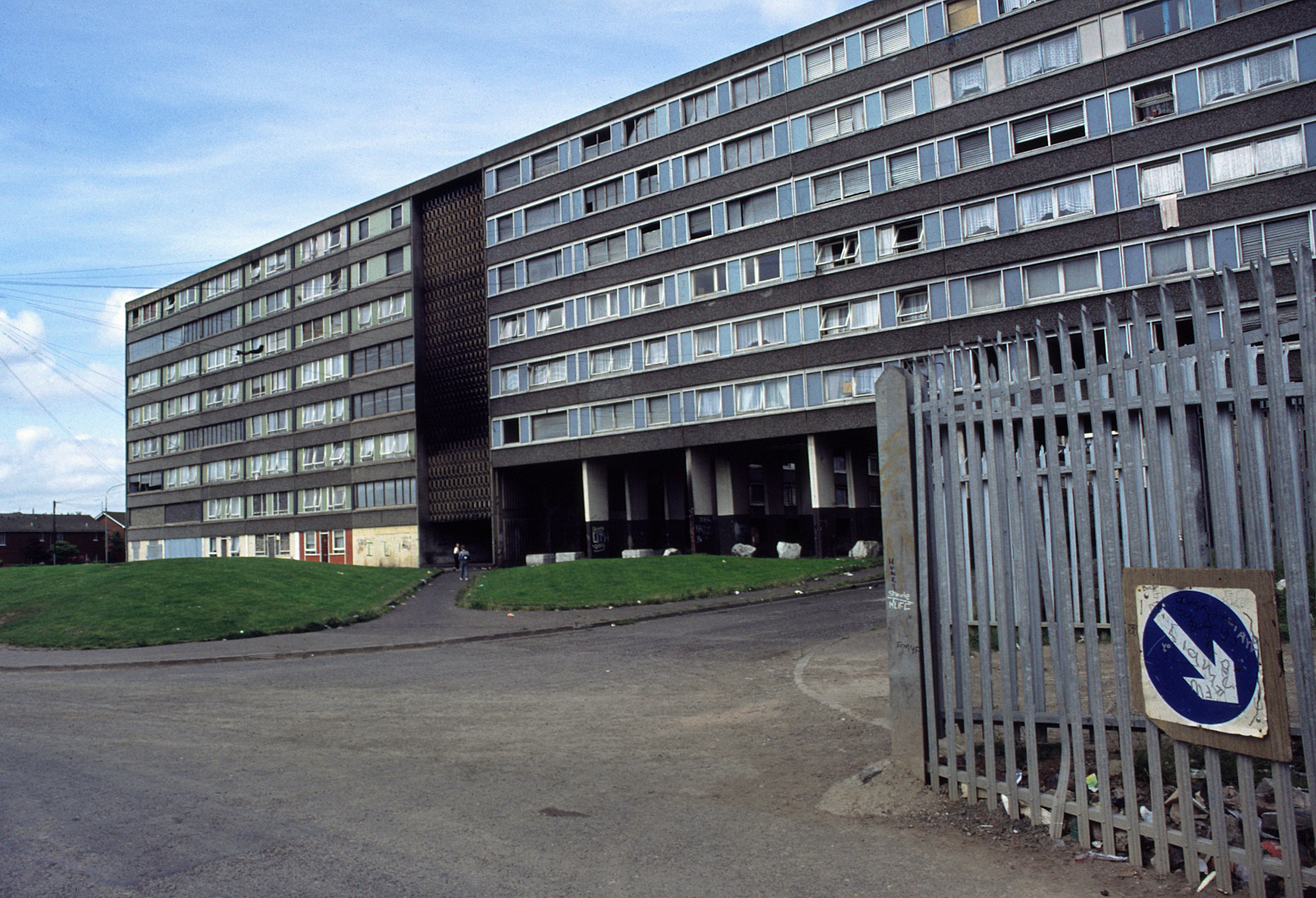
The Divis Flats in July 1992

Divis Tower is a 19-floor, 200-foot-tall (60-metre) tower in Belfast, Northern Ireland. It is located in Divis Street, which is the lower section of the Falls Road. It is currently the fifteenth-tallest building in Belfast.

== History ==
The tower was built in 1966 as part of the now-demolished Divis Flats complex, which comprised twelve eight-storey blocks of terraces and flats, named after the nearby Divis Mountain. The tower, a vertical complex of 96 flats housing approximately 110 residents, was designed by architect Frank Robertson for the Northern Ireland Housing Trust. The site on which the Tower stands was previously the location of the Charles Lanyon-designed Falls Road Methodist Church, which opened in 1854 and closed in 1966. The site was sold to Belfast Corporation for approximately £11,000.

== The Troubles ==
=== British Army observation post ===
Divis Tower was a flashpoint area during the height of the Troubles. A stronghold of the Irish Republican Socialist Party and Irish National Liberation Army (INLA), the building was referred to as the "Planet of the Irps" (in reference to the film Planet of the Apes; IRSP supporters are referred to as "Irps")

In response to Provisional IRA and INLA activity in the area, the British Army constructed an observation post on the roof in the 1970s and occupied the top two floors of the building. At the height of the Troubles, the Army was only able to access the post by helicopter.

=== Shootings ===
On 15 August 1969, nine-year-old Patrick Rooney, the first child killed in the Troubles, was killed in the tower during the 1969 riots, when the Royal Ulster Constabulary (RUC) fired a Browning machine gun from a Shorland armoured car into the flats. The RUC claimed that it was coming under sniper attack from the tower at the time. Rooney's death occurred during a day of street violence in the area. Chairman of the enquiry into the riots Mr Justice Scarman found the use of the Browning machine gun "wholly unjustifiable".

On 17 April 1972, soldiers of the Parachute Regiment shot dead an 86-year-old civilian Patrick Donaghy through the window in his home in Divis flats, killing him instantly. Patrick Donaghy was one of the oldest victims of the entire conflict and the oldest victim killed by the security forces.

On 25 February 1975, Official IRA operations officer Sean Fox was shot dead by the INLA on Cullingtree Row within the flats complex as part of a feud.

On 12 May 1981, a British Army sniper killed INLA member Emmanuel McClarnon from the top of Divis Tower, on the night that Francis Hughes died on hunger strike.

On 26 June 1981, a 29-year-old civilian named Vincent Robinson was found shot dead at the Divis Flats. The Provisional IRA carried out the killing claiming he was an informer after he was picked up by the RUC at his Andersonstown home on 17 June. It was later suspected that the killing was orchestrated to protect the identity of a British agent known as "Stakeknife" and was re-investigated as part of Operation Kenova.

On 24 July 1981, a 36-year old Catholic civilian, Peter Doherty, was shot in the head with a rubber bullet by a Royal Marines Commando. Doherty died in the Royal Victoria Hospital a week later on 31 July.

=== INLA 1982 bombing ===
In September 1982, an INLA unit detonated a bomb hidden in a drainpipe along a balcony, killing British soldier Kevin Waller, who was aged 20, and two boys, Stephen Bennet (aged 14) and Kevin Valliday (aged 12); three other civilians and another soldier were injured in the blast.

=== Dismantling of the post ===
Following the IRA's statement that it was ending its armed campaign, the Army decided to dismantle the observation post, dubbed a 'spy' post by Sinn Féin. Removal of the observation post commenced on 2 August 2005. In 2009, the top two floors of the tower were reinstated as residential properties. As part of a £1.1 million refurbishment programme by the Northern Ireland Housing Executive, eight extra flats were provided.
