= Hugh Torney (Irish republican) =

Irish Republican activist (1948–1980)

Personal details
- Born: Hugh Torney c. 1954
- Died: 3 September 1996 (Aged 42) Lurgan, County Armagh, Northern Ireland
- Cause of death: Gunshot during internal feud
- Party: Irish Republican Socialist Party
- Known for: Leader of INLA-GHQ faction during internal feud
- Nickname: Cueball

Military service
- Paramilitary: INLA-GHQ (1995–1996) Irish National Liberation Army (1974–1995) Official Irish Republican Army (1970–1974)
- Rank: Chief of Staff (INLA); Volunteer (Official IRA)

Hugh Torney (c.1954 – 3 September 1996) was an Irish National Liberation Army (INLA) paramilitary leader best known for his activities on behalf of the INLA and Irish Republican Socialist Party (IRSP) in a feud with the Irish People's Liberation Organisation (IPLO), a grouping composed of disgruntled former INLA members, in the mid-1980s; and later an internal feud following his expulsion from the organisation and eventual death.

== Early years ==
In his youth, Torney had been a member of the Official Irish Republican Army (OIRA) and as early as 1970 he was injured along with fellow OIRA member Jackie Goodman when both were wounded during their attack on the Henry Taggart British Army base in Ballymurphy, Belfast. He switched allegiance to the INLA around the formation of that group in 1974 as the Official IRA began to incorporate a more political-based agenda rather than a military campaign in the early 1970s. Being held in Long Kesh at the time, Torney officially declared his loyalty to the IRSP on 12 December 1974.

== Feud ==
The internal dynamics of the INLA brought about a lot of structural conflict. The INLA during the late 1970s through the mid-1980s can be characterized as an inter-organizational war in which there were several conflicting opinions regarding what the central ideology of the organization should be. In effect, this caused numerous attempts for power by members and furthermore, fractionalization within the INLA. When the OIRA murdered the founding leader of the INLA, Seamus Costello, in 1977 the fight for power began. Around 1984 Torney was one of a number of leading INLA members in Belfast to be imprisoned on the evidence of "supergrass" Harry Kirkpatrick. During the absence of Torney and the other leaders the INLA in Belfast came under the command of Tom McCartan, a close ally of Dominic McGlinchey. Under McCartan the Belfast INLA moved into extortion and racketeering, damaging their popular support and opening up the possibility of a wider feud with the Provisional Irish Republican Army (PIRA), which controlled much of the Belfast rackets. McCartan and the increasingly "anti-social" direction taken by the group under his leadership was met with anger by Torney and the others held in prison and led to a factionalisation of the INLA in prison. One group under Gerard Steenson favoured liquidating the INLA altogether; a second under John "Jap" O'Reilly, to which Torney belonged, favoured reform of the organisation; a third, loyal to Tom McAllister, vacillated between Steenson and O'Reilly.

In 1987, John O'Reilly was murdered in a negotiation attempt with Steenson, opening the door for Hugh Torney. Before Torney took command of the INLA he was attacked by an opposition faction of the organization where two of his comrades were killed. This prompted him to retaliate and murder Gerard Steenson, a former INLA member and a founding leader of the IPLO. Due to erratic leadership the INLA was never able to implement a functioning system of operationalization.

The Irish Republican Socialist Party was formed under the beliefs that national liberation and class structure cannot be separated. The INLA was the military force for the IRSP. When Torney became the leader of the INLA his biggest opposers splintered off and formed the opposing Republican group, the Irish People's Liberation Organization (IPLO) who backed the Republican Socialist Collective political party. The feuding between the two groups derived mainly over a power struggle as the IPLO tried to make the Republican Socialist Collective party the major republican-socialist organization in Northern Ireland. Following a truce between the INLA and IPLO, the IRA launched a mounting attack against the Irish People's Liberation Organization and the group was put down in the fall of 1992.

Following the formation of the Irish People's Liberation Organisation (IPLO) in 1986 by Steenson and his supporters, Torney was identified, along with O'Reilly, Peter Stewart and Thomas 'Ta' Power, as one of their top INLA targets. In January 1987 Torney went with O'Reilly, Stewart and Power to a summit at a Rosnaree hotel put together by Tom McAllister in an attempt to bring about an accord between the two factions. However the IPLO took advantage of the opportunity by instead sending two gunmen to the hotel. O'Reilly and Power were killed in the attack with Stewart and Torney surviving with injuries. Torney was shot in the hand but otherwise escaped with minor wounds.

== Chief of Staff ==
Nicknamed Cueball Torney by neighbours in Divis flats (as Qball was extension of the name Hugh), Hugh Torney took control of the INLA in 1987 following the death of Gerard Steenson as one of the few respected among the INLA's weakening leadership. Loyalist sectarian murders were bearing heavily on the Catholic/nationalist community and Torney struggled to hold back reactionary elements within his grouping. The Starry Plough newspaper re-emerged as a vehicle for socialist republican and Marxist discussion (a policy that had been advocated in Ta Power's analysis). Paradoxically, Torney, John Fennell and Gino Gallagher had combined in a major INLA operation with the shooting dead of several UVF members on the Shankill Road, including brigade officer Trevor King.

Torney's role in the killings of King and his allies led to a failed attempt on his own life in September 1994. UVF gunmen occupied Torney's Lower Falls home and held his family hostage while they awaited Torney's return. However the INLA leader, who had a reputation for being especially guarded about his personal safety, got wind of the event and did not return home, resulting in the UVF members abandoning their attempt and releasing Torney's family.

== Operations ==
Common operational tactics deployed by previous INLA leaders included extortion, kidnapping, and racketeering. Under Torney rule, the INLA performed attacks in the form of shootings and bombings against people loyal to the British government and Protestant civilians. In 1982, Hugh was held responsible for a bombing that targeted British soldiers that resulted in the death of two children and one soldier. During the 1987 internal dispute within the INLA Hugh was involved in an attack on an opposition faction that killed twelve people before the death of Gerard Steenson brought the feud to an end. In June 1994 Torney ordained the killings of three Ulster Volunteer Force, a loyalist paramilitary organization, which led to retaliation killings of six Catholic civilians. Once Torney had been disbanded from the main INLA and created his own faction of the group his number two, Dessie McCleery, was murdered by the Gallagher faction of the INLA and on 9 June 1996.

== Downfall ==
The beginning of the end of Hugh's tenure as the chief of staff for the INLA occurred on 4 April 1995. Hugh Torney, along with three other Belfast INLA members were transporting a large quantity of weapons and ammunitions near Dublin. However, the arms dealer they had purchased the weapons from informed the police of the whereabouts allowing authorities to raid the operation. The police fired stun grenades at the vehicle and arrested the four men inside, also discovering six assault rifles, twenty handguns and 2000 rounds of ammunition. Following his arrest, Torney stated in a Dublin court that there was a "de facto" INLA ceasefire being observed; although, it was a non-consultative decision with the membership, it was generally regarded as the case following the Provisional IRA's recent "cessation of hostilities".

Due to the arrest of the organisation's head many INLA members criticised the judgement of the leadership, and during the four months that he was in jail Torney was denounced as an illegitimate leader, expelled from the INLA, and Gino Gallagher ascended as the new chief of staff. Angered upon release, Torney formulated a new faction of the INLA known as the INLA-General Headquarters (INLA GHQ), composed mainly of his most loyal supporters. Within the nine-month feud between the INLA GHQ and the main Belfast faction led by Gallagher, six deaths due to violence occurred, including the ordered killing of Gino Gallagher by Hugh Torney's GHQ members.

Torney himself was shot and killed on 3 September 1996 in Lurgan by supporters of the Gallagher faction. He was 42 at the time of his death. With Torney dead the INLA-GHQ faction announced it was to disband on 9 September. Torney and Gallagher had been two of six people killed during the feud, including INLA and IRSP founder member John Fennell, as well as Dessie McCleery and Francis Shannon.
