= List of Irish Republican separatists organizations assassinations =

This is a List of Irish Republican separatists organizations assassinations. The list includes organizations as Official Irish Republican Army, Irish People's Liberation Organisation, Irish National Liberation Army, Provisional Irish Republican Army, Real irish Republican Army and the New Irish Republican Army.

== List ==
Name	Title	Place	Location	Date of death	Killed by
William J. Twaddell	Ulster Unionist Party MP for Belfast West, and former member of the Ulster Imperial Guards	Belfast	Northern Ireland	22 May 1922	Irish Republican Army.
Henry Wilson	Ulster Unionist Party MP for North Down, and former British Army Field Marshal.	London	England	22 June 1922	Irish Republican Army.
Henry Boyle Townshend Somerville	Vice Admiral in the Royal Navy	Castletownshend	Republic of Ireland	24 March 1936	Anti-Treaty IRA
Robert Curtis	British Army soldier	Belfast	Northern Ireland	6 February 1971	Provisional Irish Republican Army.
John McCaig	British Army personnel	Belfast	Northern Ireland	10 March 1971	Provisional Irish Republican Army.
Dougald McCaughey	British Army personnel	Belfast	Northern Ireland	10 March 1971	Provisional Irish Republican Army.
Joseph McCaig	British Army personnel	Belfast	Northern Ireland	10 March 1971	Provisional Irish Republican Army.
Michael Willetts	British Army soldier	Belfast	Northern Ireland	25 May 1971	Provisional Irish Republican Army.
John Barnhill	Ulster Unionist Party Senator	Strabane	Northern Ireland	12 December 1971	Official Irish Republican Army
Gerard Weston	Roman Catholic priest	Aldershot	England	22 February 1972	Official Irish Republican Army
Sydney Agnew	Bus conductor	Belfast	Northern Ireland	18 January 1972	Uncertain whether the Provisional Irish Republican Army or the Official Irish Republican Army.
Samuel Donegan	Inspector of the Garda Síochána	Newtownbutler, County Fermanagh	Northern Ireland	8 June 1972	Provisional Irish Republican Army.
William J. Staunton	British magistrate	Belfast	Northern Ireland	25 January 1973	Provisional Irish Republican Army.
Peter Wilson	Northern Irish resident	Belfast	Northern Ireland	1 August 1973	Provisional Irish Republican Army.
Thomas Niedermayer	German industrialist	Belfast	Northern Ireland	1973	Provisional Irish Republican Army.
Billy Fox	Fine Gael TD for Monaghan in Dáil Éireann and Senator in Seanad Éireann	Tircooney, County Monaghan,	Republic of Ireland	12 March 1974	Provisional Irish Republican Army.
Martin McBirney	magistrate	Belfast	Northern Ireland	16 September 1974	Provisional Irish Republican Army.
Rory Conaghan	magistrate	Belfast	Northern Ireland	16 September 1974	Provisional Irish Republican Army.
Stephen Tibble	Police officer of the Metropolitan Police Service	London	England	26 February 1975	Provisional Irish Republican Army.
Billy McMillen	Member of Official Sinn Féin and the Official Irish Republican Army	Belfast	Northern Ireland	28 April 1975	Irish National Liberation Army
Roger Goad	Police officer of the Metropolitan Police Service	London	England	29 August 1975	Provisional Irish Republican Army
Gordon Hamilton Fairley	Professor of medical oncology at St Bartholomew's Hospital	London	England	23 October 1975	Provisional Irish Republican Army
Sammy Smyth	Northern Irish loyalist founding member of the Ulster Defence Association	Ardoyne	Northern Ireland	10 March 1976	Provisional Irish Republican Army
Robert McConnell	Northern Irish loyalist and soldier in the Ulster Defence Regiment	Newtownhamilton, County Armagh	Northern Ireland	5 April 1976	Provisional Irish Republican Army
Christopher Ewart-Biggs	British Ambassador to Ireland	Dublin	Republic of Ireland	21 July 1976	Provisional Irish Republican Army
Michael Clerkin	Police officer of the Garda Síochána	Portarlington, County Laois,	Republic of Ireland	16 October 1976	Provisional Irish Republican Army
Robert Nairac	British Army officer	Ravensdale Woods, County Louth,	Republic of Ireland	15 May 1977	Provisional Irish Republican Army
Seamus Costello	Leader of the Irish Republican Socialist Party and former leader of the Irish National Liberation Army	Dublin	Republic of Ireland	5 October 1977	Official Irish Republican Army
Ian Corden-Lloyd	British Army officer	Jonesborough, County Armagh	Northern Ireland	17 February 1978	Provisional Irish Republican Army
Richard Sykes	British Ambassador to the Netherland	Hague	Netherlands	22 March 1979	Provisional Irish Republican Army
Airey Neave	Shadow Secretary of State for Northern Ireland	London	England	30 March 1979	Irish National Liberation Army
Eamon Ryan	Irish civil servant	Tramore, County Waterford,	Republic of Ireland	7 August 1979	Provisional Irish Republican Army
Louis Mountbatten	1st Earl Mountbatten of Burma	Mullaghmore, County Sligo	Republic of Ireland	27 August 1979	Provisional Irish Republican Army
Doreen Knatchbull	Baroness Brabourne Anglo-Irish aristocrat, socialite	Mullaghmore, County Sligo	Republic of Ireland	28 August 1979	Provisional Irish Republican Army
John Morley	Detective of the Garda Síochána	Loughglynn	Northern Ireland	7 July 1980	Irish National Liberation Army
Henry Byrne	Police officer of the Garda Síochána	Loughglynn	Northern Ireland	7 July 1980	Irish National Liberation Army
Herbert Westmacott	British Army officer	Belfast	Northern Ireland	2 May 1980	Provisional Irish Republican Army
Seamus Quaid	Police officer of the Garda Síochána	Ballyconnick, County Wexford,	Republic of Ireland	13 October 1980	Provisional Irish Republican Army
James Stronge	Former Ulster Unionist Party MP for Mid-Armagh and MPA for Armagh	Tynan, County Armagh	Northern Ireland	21 January 1981	Provisional Irish Republican Army
William McCullough	Leading member of the Ulster Defence Association	Belfast	Northern Ireland	16 October 1981	Irish National Liberation Army
Kenneth Howorth	Police officer of the Metropolitan Police Service	London	Northern Ireland	26 October 1981	Provisional Irish Republican Army.
Robert Bradford	Both an Ulster Unionist Party and Vanguard Progressive Unionist Party MP for Belfast South and Methodist Minister.	Belfast	Northern Ireland	14 November 1981	Provisional Irish Republican Army.
John McKeague	Ulster loyalist and founding member of the Red Hand Commando paramilitary	Belfast	Northern Ireland	29 January 1982	Irish National Liberation Army
Edgar Graham	Ulster Unionist Party MPA for Belfast South, barrister and academic	Belfast	Northern Ireland	7 December 1983	Provisional Irish Republican Army
Gary Sheehan	Police officer recruit of the Garda Síochána	Derrada	Northern Ireland	16 December 1983	Provisional Irish Republican Army
Kenneth Salvesen	American business consultant	London	England	17 December 1983	Provisional Irish Republican Army
Alistair Slater	British Army soldier	Kesh, County Fermanagh	Northern Ireland	2 December 1984	Provisional Irish Republican Army
Mary Travers	Teacher	Belfast	Republic of Ireland	8 April 1984	Provisional Irish Republican Army
Frank Hand	Detective of the Garda Síochána	County Meath	Northern Ireland	10 August 1984	Provisional Irish Republican Army
Brian Stack	Chief prison officer at Portlaoise Prison	Dublin	Republic of Ireland	29 September 1984	Provisional Irish Republican Army
Anthony Berry	British Conservative MP	Brighton, Sussex	England	12 October 1984	Provisional Irish Republican Army
Patrick Joseph Morrissey	Police Sergeant of the Garda Síochána	Tallanstown	Republic of Ireland	27 June 1985	Irish National Liberation Army
John Bingham	Northern Irish loyalist and member of the Ulster Volunteer Force	Belfast	Northern Ireland	14 September 1986	Provisional Irish Republican Army
Thomas "Ta" Power	Member of the Irish Republican Socialist Party and Irish National Liberation Army	Drogheda, County Louth	Republic of Ireland	20 January 1987	Irish People's Liberation Organisation
John O'Reilly	Member of the Irish Republican Socialist Party and Irish National Liberation Army	Drogheda, County Louth	Republic of Ireland	20 January 1987	Irish People's Liberation Organisation
Gerard Steenson	Leader of the Irish People's Liberation Organisation and former member of the Irish National Liberation Army	Belfast	Northern Ireland	14 March 1987	Irish National Liberation Army
Maurice Gibson	Lord Justice of Appeal	Killean, County Armagh	Northern Ireland	April 27, 1987	Provisional Irish Republican Army
George Seawright	Democratic Unionist Party MPA for Belfast North, Belfast City Councillor and member of the Ulster Volunteer Force.	Belfast	Northern Ireland	3 December 1987	Irish People's Liberation Organisation
John McMichael	Ulster Defence Association Deputy Commander and leader of its South Belfast Brigade.	Belfast	Northern Ireland	22 December 1987	Provisional Irish Republican Army
David Howes	Corporals in the British Army	Belfast	Northern Ireland	19 March 1988	Provisional Irish Republican Army
Derek Wood	Corporals in the British Army	Belfast	Northern Ireland	19 March 1988	Provisional Irish Republican Army
Gillian Johnston	Chemist and shop worker	Belleek County Fermanagh	Northern Ireland	18 March 1988	Provisional Irish Republican Army
Ian Shinner	British Senior Aircraftsman in the Royal Air Force based in West Germany	Roermond	Netherlands	May 2, 1988	Provisional Irish Republican Army
John Miller Reid	British Senior Aircraftsman in the Royal Air Force based in West Germany	Nieuw-Bergen	Netherlands	May 2, 1988	Provisional Irish Republican Army
John Baxter	British Senior Aircraftsman in the Royal Air Force based in West Germany	Nieuw-Bergen	Netherlands	May 2, 1988	Provisional Irish Republican Army
Robert Seymour	Northern Irish loyalist and leading member of the Ulster Volunteer Force.	Belfast	Northern Ireland	15 June 1988	Provisional Irish Republican Army
Joseph Fenton	Northern Irish estate agent and suspected Special Branch informer	Belfast	Northern Ireland	26 February 1989	Provisional Irish Republican Army
John McAnulty	grain importer	Culloville, County Armagh	Northern Ireland	17 July 1989	Provisional Irish Republican Army
Heidi Hazell	German citizen	Unna	West Germany	7 September 1989	Provisional Irish Republican Army
Nick Spanos	Australian tourists	Roermond	Netherlands	27 May 1990	Provisional Irish Republican Army
Stephen Melrose	Australian tourists	Roermond	Netherlands	27 May 1990	Provisional Irish Republican Army
Catherine Dunne	Irish Catholic nun	Armagh	Northern Ireland	24 July 1990	Provisional Irish Republican Army
Ian Gow	British Conservative MP for Eastbourne	Hankham, East Sussex	England	30 July 1990	Provisional Irish Republican Army
Donald Kaberry	British Conservative politician, Baron Kaberry of Adel	London	England	13 March 1991	Provisional Irish Republican Army
Margaret Perry	Civil servant,	Mullaghmore, County Sligo	Republic of Ireland	21 June 1991	Provisional Irish Republican Army
Thomas Oliver	Irish farmer	Belleeks, County Armagh.	Northern Ireland	18 July 1991	Provisional Irish Republican Army
Jimmy Brown	Leading member in the Irish People's Liberation Organisation's Belfast Brigade	Belfast	Northern Ireland	18 August 1992	Irish People's Liberation Organisation
Sammy Ward	Leader of the Irish People's Liberation Organisation	Belfast	Northern Ireland	31 October 1992	Provisional Irish Republican Army
Glenn Goodman	Special Constable of North Yorkshire Police	Burton Salmon	England	7 June 1992	Provisional Irish Republican Army
Trevor King	Ulster loyalist and leading member of the Ulster Volunteer Force	Belfast	Northern Ireland	9 July 1994	Irish National Liberation Army
Ray Smallwoods	Northern Irish loyalist and leader of the Ulster Democratic Party .	Lisburn	Northern Ireland	11 July 1994	Provisional Irish Republican Army
Raymond Elder	Northern Irish loyalist and leading member of the Ulster Defence Association's South Belfast Brigade	Belfast	Northern Ireland	31 July 1994	Provisional Irish Republican Army
Joe Bratty	Northern Irish loyalist and leading member of the Ulster Defence Association's South Belfast Brigade	Belfast	Northern Ireland	31 July 1994	Provisional Irish Republican Army
Martin Cahill	Irish crime boss	Dublin	Republic of Ireland	18 August 1994	Provisional Irish Republican Army
Hugh Torney	Member of the Irish Republican Socialist Party and leader of the GHQ faction of the Irish National Liberation Army	Lurgan, County Armagh	Northern Ireland	3 September 1996	Irish National Liberation Army
Billy Wright	Ulster loyalist, leader of the Loyalist Volunteer Force and former member of the Ulster Volunteer Force.	Maze Prison	Northern Ireland	27 December 1997	Irish National Liberation Army
Andrew Kearney	Northern Irish resident	Belfast	Northern Ireland	19 July 1998	Provisional Irish Republican Army
Eamon Collins	Former member of the Provisional Irish Republican Army	Doran's Hill, Newry	Northern Ireland	27 January 1999	Provisional Irish Republican Army
Charles Bennett	Irish murder victim.	Belfast	Northern Ireland	30 July 1999	Provisional Irish Republican Army
Matthew Burns	Irish murder victim, alleged drug dealer.	Castlewellan, County Down.	Northern Ireland	21 February 2002	Real Irish Republican Army
Gareth O'Connor	member of the Real IRA and suspected Special Branch agent.	Newry Canal, County Down.	Northern Ireland	11 May 2003	Provisional Irish Republican Army
James Curran	Dublin resident	Dublin	Republic of Ireland	3 April 2005	Provisional Irish Republican Army
Denis Donaldson	Former member of Sinn Féin and the Provisional Irish Republican Army, also an informer for MI5 and Special Branch.	Glenties, County Donegal	Republic of Ireland	4 April 2006	Real Irish Republican Army
Paul Quinn	Northern Ireland resident	Oram, County Monaghan	Republic of Ireland	20 October 2007	Provisional Irish Republican Army
Andrew Burns	Northern Irish resident and member of the Real IRA	Castlefin, County Donegal.	Republic of Ireland	12 February 2008	Óglaigh na hÉireann
David Black	Prison officer at Maghaberry Prison	Craigavon	Northern Ireland	1 November 2012	New Irish Republican Army
Eamon Kelly	Irish crime boss	Dublin	Republic of Ireland	4 December 2012	New Irish Republican Army
Adrian Ismay	Prison officer at Maghaberry Prison	Belfast	Northern Ireland	4 March 2016	New Irish Republican Army
