= Timeline of the Troubles in Dublin =

The following is a timeline of events pertaining to the Troubles in Dublin, Republic of Ireland.

== 1969 ==
- 5 August – The Ulster Volunteer Force planted their first bomb in the Republic of Ireland, damaging the RTÉ Television Centre in Donnybrook, Dublin. There were injuries.
- 26 December – The UVF planted a bomb at the O'Connell Monument on O'Connell Street. Little damage was done to the statue but the blast smashed windows in a half-mile radius.
- 28 December – The UVF detonated a bomb outside the Garda Síochána central detective bureau in Dublin. The nearby telephone exchange headquarters was suspected to have been the target.

== 1970 ==
- 3 April – Garda Richard Fallon (44) was shot by members of Saor Éire during a robbery of the Royal Bank of Ireland at Arran Quay.
- 26 March – A bomb damaged an electricity substation in Tallaght. An anonymous letter claimed responsibility on behalf of the UVF.
- April – August: numerous fires were set in warehouses and businesses in Dublin, rumoured to have been caused by the UVF following a threat made saying that "Dublin will burn". Gardaí stated that the fires were unrelated to the threats and were caused by local arsonists.
- 2 July – A bomb damaged the main Dublin–Belfast railway line at Baldoyle. Gardaí believed it was the work of the UVF.
- 13 October – Saor Éire member Liam Walsh (35) was killed in a premature explosion when he and another member, Martin Casey, were planting a device at a railway line at the rear of McKee Barracks off Blackhorse Avenue in Dublin.

== 1971 ==
- 17 January - Daniel O'Connell's tomb in Glasnevin Cemetery was damaged by a Loyalist bomb. No injuries.
- 8 February - The Wolfe Tone statue at St. Stephen's Green was destroyed by a Loyalist bomb. No injuries.
- 25 October - Saor Éire member Peter Graham (26) was shot dead in his flat at 110 Stephen's Green in an internal feud.
- 30 December - Provisional Irish Republican Army (IRA) member Jack McCabe (55) was killed in a premature bomb explosion in a garage at Swords Road, Santry.

== 1972 ==
- 2 February – The British Embassy on Merrion Square was burned down in response to Bloody Sunday in Derry. A British-owned insurance office in Dún Laoghaire and Austin Reeds outfitters on Grafton Street were also petrol-bombed. The offices of British European Airways, the British Overseas Airways Corporation, and the Thomas Cook travel agency were also attacked, along with the RAF club on Earlsfort Terrace.
- 28–29 October – A 12 lb bomb was planted in Connolly Station, Amiens Street by Loyalists but dismantled by the Irish Army before it went off. They were also responsible for leaving firebombs in bedrooms in four Dublin hotels (Wynns, The Gresham, The Skylon and The Crofton).
- 26 November – A bomb exploded outside the rear exit door of the Film Centre Cinema, O'Connell Bridge House injuring 40 people.
- 1 December - Bus driver George Bradshaw (30) and bus conductor Tommy Duffy (23) were killed and 127 injured in the first Loyalist car bomb planted in the Republic, close to the CIÉ Depot at Sackville Place off O'Connell Street. A second car bomb exploded 7 minutes beforehand causing massive damage to Liberty Hall and multiple injuries.

== 1973 ==
- 20 January – CIÉ bus conductor Thomas Douglas (25) was killed and 17 injured in a Loyalist car bomb in Sackville Place off O'Connell Street. The car used in the bombing had been hijacked at Agnes Street, Belfast.
- 3 August – Cashier James Farrell (54) was killed by the IRA during an armed robbery while delivering wages to British Leyland factory, Cashel Road, Crumlin.
- October – The IRA used a hijacked helicopter to free three of their members from the exercise yard of Mountjoy Prison, Dublin. One of those who escaped was Séamus Twomey, then Chief of Staff of the IRA who was later recaptured in December 1977.

== 1974 ==
- 17 May – Dublin and Monaghan bombings — Three no-warning bombs exploded in Parnell Street, Talbot Street, and South Leinster Street during rush hour; 26 people and an unborn child were killed. Over 300 were injured. Italian restaurant owner Antonio Magliocco (37) and a French-born Jewish woman Simone Chetrit (30) were amongst those killed.

== 1975 ==
- 22 March – The funeral of IRA member Tom Smith, shot dead during an escape attempt from Portlaoise Prison on St. Patrick's Day, was attacked by Gardaí. Three people, including a press photographer, were injured.
- 11 September – An off-duty Garda, Michael Reynolds (30), was shot dead in Saint Anne's Park by two Anarchists, Noel and Marie Murray, former members of Official Sinn Féin, following an armed robbery at the Bank of Ireland, Killester.
- 2 October – Official IRA member Billy Wright (35) was shot by members of the organisation in his brother's hair salon on the Cabra Road. He died in hospital on 19 October. He was targeted after he made a statement to Gardaí, implicating a prominent member of the Official IRA, about an armed robbery in Heuston Station that occurred in September 1973.
- 8 November – Two Loyalist bombs at the arrival terminal at Dublin Airport injured eight and killed John Hayes (30), an Aer Rianta employee.

== 1976 ==
- February – A 25 lb bomb exploded in the Shelbourne Hotel along with eight incendiary bombs in department stores and shops in the Grafton Street and Henry Street areas. There were no injuries. Loyalists were blamed.
- 21 July – Christopher Ewart-Biggs (55), British Ambassador to Ireland, and Private Secretary to the Permanent Under-Secretary of the Northern Ireland Office Judith Cooke (26) were killed by an IRA-planted land mine outside his official residence at Glencairn estate, Sandyford, South Dublin.

== 1977 ==
- 7 September – John Lawlor (38), a suspected informer, was killed by the IRA in Timmons Bar (later called Leonard's), on the corner of Watling Street and Victoria Quay.
- 5 October – INLA Chief of Staff and leader of the IRSP Seamus Costello (38) was shot dead in his car on North Strand Road by OIRA member James Flynn.

== 1979 ==
- 28 January – English salesman Arthur Lockett (29) was found dead in Ticknock in the Dublin Mountains. He had been beaten with clubs by a number of men and left for dead. Lockett had been boasting in a pub that he had connections in the British Army. It emerged he had worked in West Germany for a time where he had business deals with both American and British army personnel at NATO bases.

== 1981 ==
- 24 March – Members of Revolutionary Struggle shot and injured Geoffrey Armstrong, the chairman of British vehicle-manufacturing company British Leyland and director of the Confederation of British Industry, while he gave a lecture in Trinity College. Before shooting, the gunmen shouted: "Everybody freeze, nobody move! This action is in support of the H-Blocks"
- 18 July – A 15,000 strong crowd in support of the hunger strikers clashed with 1,500 Gardaí close to the British Embassy in Ballsbridge. 200 people were injured, including 150 Gardaí. Dozens were arrested and 1 million pounds worth of damage was caused.

== 1982 ==
- 19 February – Garda Patrick Reynolds (23) was shot dead by an INLA member at 33 Avonbeg Gardens, Tallaght. Reynolds and four other police officers had burst into the flat where a group of armed INLA men were counting money from a recent bank robbery.

A tree planted in memory of Garda Patrick Reynolds at Tallaght Garda Station

- 4 June – Senior Official IRA member James Flynn (40) was shot dead by the INLA outside Cusack's pub, North Strand Road close to where he had killed Seamus Costello five years previously.

== 1983 ==
- 25 March – Brian Stack (47), chief prison officer at Portlaoise prison, was shot by the IRA while walking along the South Circular Road, shortly after leaving a boxing contest at the National Stadium. He died in hospital on 29 September 1984.
- 24 November - Don Tidey, an American supermarket executive, was kidnapped outside his home in Rathfarnham. He was rescued on 16 December after being held captive for 23 days.

== 1985 ==
- 20 August – Tyrone businessman Seamus McEvoy (46), a building contractor for the British Army and Royal Ulster Constabulary, was shot dead by the IRA at his home on Eglinton Road, Donnybrook. A statement said he had been repeatedly warned against doing work for the security forces but continued to supply materials and temporary huts for barracks and military border posts.

== 1986 ==
- 22 March – A member of the Garda Special Branch fired shots into the air on Prince's Street North off O'Connell Street following scuffles while Gardaí rearrested Irish Republican Eibhlinn Glenholmes after a much-publicised extradition battle.
- 8 November – UFF planted four small four explosive devices in O'Connell Street. No injuries.

== 1987 ==
- February – The UDA planted incendiary bombs in a cinema and café in Middle Abbey Street, a bonded warehouse in Mabbot Lane and a bookshop in Talbot Street. Only the device in the warehouse exploded but caused little damage.

== 1988 ==
- 17 June – Six anti-extradition protestors were arrested at the official opening of the Anna Livia Water Feature on O'Connell Street. "Around 40" protestors disrupted the ceremony by cutting the cables for the loudspeakers, rendering the "brief addresses" to the crowd "virtually inaudible", and a planned performance by a choir from Central Michigan University had to be cancelled. One protestor smashed a window on a nearby building and sat out on a window ledge with a large unfurled banner reading "no extradition".
- 12 September – A public park named the Peace Garden (now Peace Park) was opened in Dublin, dedicated to "the yearning for peace in Ireland". A week later, the park served as the endpoint of the Workers' Party's "Dublin March for Peace", held to mark the UN International Day of Peace.

== 1991 ==
- February – Loyalists planted two crude incendiary bombs in an O'Connell Street department store. They failed to explode.

== 1993 ==
- 18 September – On the day of the All-Ireland Hurling Final, Loyalists claimed responsibility for planting a small bomb and cutting communication cables near to Store Street Garda station.

== 1994 ==
- 5 January – Two members of the Irish Army bomb disposal unit were injured when a parcel bomb sent by the UVF to the Sinn Féin offices in Dublin exploded during examination at Cathal Brugha Barracks.
- 21 May – IRA member Martin Doherty (35) was shot dead by UVF gunmen in Widow Scanlon's pub, Pearse Street after preventing two Loyalist bombers entering a Sinn Féin fundraiser. A second doorman, Paddy Burke, was shot in the throat but survived. The gunmen left the scene in a car driven by a third man, leaving behind the holdall which contained an 18 lb bomb. The bomb's detonator exploded as people attended to Doherty and Burke but the main explosives failed to ignite. <http://www.anphoblacht.com/contents/23067>
- 18 August – Prominent Dublin criminal Martin Cahill (45), known as The General, was shot dead in his car by the IRA at the road junction where Oxford Road meets Charleston Road in Rathmines. The IRA alleged that Cahill had connections to the UVF and had sold the group stolen paintings.
- 21 September – The UVF planted a 1.5 kg bomb on the Belfast–Dublin train. It partially exploded as the train neared Dublin Connolly railway station, wounding two people.
