= Thomas "Ta" Power =

Personal details
- Born: Thomas Power; January 1954; Belfast, Northern Ireland
- Died: 20 January 1987 (aged 33); Rosnaree Hotel, Drogheda, Ireland
- Cause of death: Gunshot during ambush by the IPLO
- Political party: Irish Republican Socialist Party
- Nickname: Ta

Military service
- Paramilitaries: Irish National Liberation Army (1975–1987); Official Irish Republican Army (early 1970s–1975)

Thomas Power (January 1954 – 20 January 1987) was an Irish republican socialist, also known as Ta Power, who was a leading member of the Irish Republican Socialist Party (IRSP) and Irish National Liberation Army (INLA). According to the Irish Republican Socialist Movement (IRSM) biography page on Power, he was from Friendly Street in the Markets area of south Belfast, where he had become an activist. He had originally joined the Official IRA but transferred allegiance to the INLA in 1975 while a prisoner in Long Kesh, along with 20 other men.

Power was arrested on the word of the supergrass Harry Kirkpatrick.

Power spent the longest period on remand—nearly four and a half years—of any republican prisoner. During this time he developed his political analysis of the IRSP/INLA situation, which he believed needed "fresh blood".

Power, the ex-INLA chief of staff Hugh Torney told the authors Henry McDonald and Jack Holland, wanted to build a consensus within the INLA against Gerard Steenson, although he was willing to accept back the rest of the IPLO.

Power had been out of prison a month when, aged 33, he was shot and killed on 20 January 1987 while drinking tea in Rosnaree Hotel on the Dublin Road, outside Drogheda in County Louth, Ireland, along with INLA leader John "Jap" O'Reilly. They were there to negotiate a truce with the IPLO. Also with them was Peter Stuart and Hugh Torney, who was injured. The Irish People's Liberation Organisation, which was largely composed of former INLA members, claimed responsibility. It is possible that Steenson was one of the killers—who both wore false beards— although Torney believed otherwise. O'Reilly died at the scene, Power in the ambulance later.

Power was a Marxist theorist and historian within the IRSM, who advocated dramatic changes in its strategy and structure. This is the current policy blueprint for the IRSM. These ideas can be read in the 'Ta Power Document' and include the principles of 'collective leadership', 'politics in command' and other concepts Power believed would steer the IRSM away from a military-led strategy. The document is highly critical of the then IRSP/INLA political philosophy. He particularly criticised what he saw as a "macho culture" within his movement. He wrote:

We get no analysis, we get no strategy outside the basic [military] confrontation—it eventually becomes an end in itself simply due to the fact that they don’t know any other strategy.

These ideas were adopted by the INLA just before Power's death and were finally implemented within the movement as a whole under the direction of Gino Gallagher. Power, says the writer Andrew Sanders, was a "revered" figure in the INLA.

Jack Holland and Henry McDonald posited that "[S]ubordinating military struggle to carefully thought-out political strategy had been Ta Power's dream for a long time. In the 1980s Sinn Féin and the IRA made that a reality with their ballot box and armalite policy. The provos learnt well from the lessons and mistakes of the IRSP/INLA".
