= Brigid Makowski =

Irish politician and activist 1937-2017

- Makowski, c. 1990

Member of Shannon Town Commission
- In office 1982–1999

Clare County Councillor
- In office 1991–1999
- Constituency: Shannon

Personal details
- Born: Brigid Sheils; 6 January 1937 Bogside, Derry, Northern Ireland
- Died: 15 April 2017 (aged 80) Letterkenny, County Donegal, Ireland
- Party: Independent
- Other political affiliations: Irish Republican Socialist Party (1974 to c. 1985); Official Sinn Féin (1970 to 1974)

Brigid Makowski (née Sheils; 6 January 1937 – 15 April 2017) was an Irish Republican activist and politician from Derry, Northern Ireland. A member of Clan na Gael in the 1960s, she became especially politically active following the start of the Troubles in 1969. Following the split in Sinn Féin that same year, she sided with Official Sinn Féin and formally joined the party in 1970. However, following the declaration of a ceasefire by the Official Irish Republican Army in 1974, Makowski broke from the officials and helped found the Irish Republican Socialist Party. In 1981 she was elected to Shannon Town Commission in County Clare and later she became a member of Clare County Council in the 1990s.

== Biography ==
=== Early life ===
She was born on 6 January 1937 in the Bogside area of Derry to a "very Republican, very Catholic" family. Her father Paddy Shiels had been a member of the Irish Volunteers c. 1914 and was arrested following the Easter Rising. During the Irish War of Independence, Paddy Shiels was jailed again and subsequently went on hunger strike in protest.

Hailing from a poor family, Shiels left education at age 16 and went to work. She first was employed at a shirt factory in Derry but was later fired for trying to organise a strike for better working conditions. Shiels subsequently emigrated to England, where she began work at a hotel.

Shiels met Leo Makowski, a Polish-American navy man, when his U.S. Navy ship U.S.S Johnson docked in Derry in August 1954. They had two dates before Leo's ship left. They corresponded and he eventually proposed, she accepted, sailed to Philadelphia and they married there on 16 April 1955. Together they would have five children together.

=== Republican activism ===
In 1961 Makowski joined the Irish-American grouping Clan na Gael in Philadelphia. In 1967 Makowski and some other members of Clan na Gael went to witness Rev. Ian Paisley speak at a Protestant church in New Jersey. During the meeting, Makowski and Paisley engaged in a verbal spat.

By 1968, Makowski was experiencing depression and homesickness, and it was decided that she would return home to Derry. She arrived home on 3 October 1968, two days before the Derry Civil Rights March of 5 October, which devolved into mass violence when the march was attacked by the Royal Ulster Constabulary (RUC). The march is widely considered to be the "official" start of the Troubles in Northern Ireland. Makowski would participate in that march as well as another march on 13 November. She would also begin attending the Republican Clubs, a front for Sinn Féin which had been banned in Northern Ireland since 1964.

By June 1969 all of Makowski's children had moved to Derry to join her. In August 1969 she was present for the Battle of the Bogside; Makowski (pregnant with her fifth child at the time) and her sister provided medical aid to Catholics from their mother's apartment. The RUC eventually raided the apartment and tear-gassed the family.

Following the Battle of the Bogside, Makowski's husband insisted she and her children return to Philadelphia immediately. She obliged but continued to remain politically active, again alongside Clan na Gael. In July 1970 Makowski was a part of a sit-in protest against the British Consulate in Philadelphia following the Falls Curfew. Makowski occupied the building for five days before being physically removed by police.

=== Republic of Ireland ===
The Makowski family relocated to Ireland once again in the early 1970s, but for reasons of safety chose to relocate to Limerick City in the Republic of Ireland. There, Makowski formally joined Official Sinn Féin, siding with the Marxist-oriented group over the "traditional republicans" in the Provisional camp. In January 1972 Makowski was arrested and jailed for collecting funds (for Official Sinn Féin) without a permit. Due to being imprisoned during this time, Makowski was not present for the events of Bloody Sunday (1972). Months later, Makowski was charged with non-payment of a fine, membership of the Irish Republican Army, and incitement to violence. In doing so, Makowski became the first woman in Ireland to be charged with being a member of the IRA. A jury later found her innocent on the charge of IRA membership and incitement to violence.

In 1972 Makowski disagreed with the decision by the Official IRA to participate in a ceasefire and thereafter became a supporter of Seamus Costello. She was called to testify at the Official IRA court-martial of Costello in Mornington. She remarked after Costello had been dismissed that "Jesus could have testified on Costello's behalf and it wouldn't have changed the verdict." Following Costello's expulsion from Sinn Féin (Official) and the Official IRA, Makowski helped set up the Irish Republican Socialist Party.

=== Electoral politics ===
Representing the IRSP, Makowski was elected in 1982 as a councillor to the Shannon Town Commission.

In 1985 she was re-elected as an Independent after leaving the IRSP. She was later elected to Clare County Council in 1991. Makowski campaigned against the building of the visitor centre in Mullaghmore, in the Burren.

In 1992, she was present at the funeral of the Irish People's Liberation Organisation and Republican Socialist Collective leader Jimmy Brown. Her daughter, Stella Makowski, gave the traditional graveside speech.

On 15 April 2017, Makowski died at Letterkenny Hospital from complications following treatment for lung cancer.
