= Gerard Steenson =

Irish Republican (1957–1987)

- Born: c. 1957; Belfast, Northern Ireland
- Died: 14 March 1987 (aged 29); Springhill, Belfast, Northern Ireland
- Other name: "Doctor Death"
- Known for: Paramilitary leader
- Political party: Republican Socialist Collective (from 1986); Irish Republican Socialist Party (1974–1986)
- Military career
- Paramilitaries: Official IRA (1972–1974); INLA (1974–1986); IPLO (1986–1987)
- Service years: 1972–1987
- Units: C Company, Belfast Brigade (OIRA); INLA Belfast Brigade; IPLO Belfast Brigade
- Conflict: The Troubles: Assassination of Billy McMillen; Rosnaree Hotel shooting

Gerard Steenson (c. 1957 – 14 March 1987) was an Irish republican paramilitary and a leader of the Irish People's Liberation Organisation during The Troubles.

== Early life and career ==
A Catholic, the son of Frank Steenson, he was born around 1957 and raised in heavily republican West Belfast. Nicknamed "Doctor Death" by the media and by the Royal Ulster Constabulary for the multiple assassinations he purportedly accomplished according to The New York Times However Fortnight alleges that he got his nickname after he dressed up in a white coat to attack British soldiers guarding a patient at the Royal Victoria Hospital.

Steenson was widely associated with internecine violence between Irish republican groups. He joined the Official IRA's Belfast Brigade in 1972 at the age of 14, becoming part of the Brigade's C Company. Two years later, he left to join the Irish National Liberation Army (INLA) upon that paramilitary group's formation, consequent to their split from the Official IRA. He became head of the INLA in Belfast.

Steenson first came to notoriety as a teenager in 1975 for killing Billy McMillen, the Official IRA's Belfast leader, during the feud between the INLA and the Official IRA. Jim Cusack, a journalist describes him as the "assassin-in-chief" of Hugh Torney.

During the 1981 local elections, Steenson and Seán Mackin both led efforts within the INLA to obstruct Irish Republican Socialist Party (IRSP) candidates which disrupted their votes, viewing the decision to run in the election as wasteful, believing that the allocated resources would be better spent on weapons. Following the election, Steenson later changed his mind with regards to elections, declaring that the party should have run more candidates.

In December 1981, with Steenson fearing that the Dublin INLA leadership would make a move on him following his efforts to set up a parallel organisation, planned an assassination attempt on the Dublin leader, Harry Flynn. Following a meeting of the Ard Comhairle on 5 December, Flynn and others went for drinks in the Flowing Tide pub at the corner of Sackville Place and Marlborough Street in Dublin. Shortly before 11 p.m., Steenson's gunman entered the pub and fired shots at Flynn before his gun jammed and he fled. Though seriously wounded, Flynn survived. After the botched assassination attempt, Steenson then unsuccessfully threatened Seán Flynn for his seat on Belfast City Council. Later, on 25 January 1982, a botched attempt was also made on Seán Flynn and Bernard Dorrian at a bar in the Short Strand area, provoking a feud where a unit from the Derry INLA came to Belfast searching for Steenson. Failing to secure power, the attacks only demoralised the IRSP and INLA and began a trend of internal feuds.

In 1985, he was convicted of 67 terrorist offences (including six murders) after his former friend Harry Kirkpatrick testified against him. Kirkpatrick and Steenson were rarely seen apart in public and were given the nicknames "Pinkie and Perky".

== Creating the IPLO ==
In 1986, Steenson, Jimmy Brown, and Martin "Rook" O'Prey formed the Irish People's Liberation Organisation (IPLO), consisting of disaffected and expelled INLA members, with the express intention of wiping out the INLA and IRSP and to replace it with their own organisation. He argued in letters, written while he was in prison in the early 1980s, that the INLA had become militarily "inefficient" and that the IRSP leadership had become "ineffective" and required 'realignment'.

He was involved in the Rosnaree Hotel shooting on 20 January 1987, where a meeting between the leadership of the INLA and IPLO was to take place to end hostilities. However, IPLO members ambushed the four INLA members at the hotel, killing Thomas "Ta" Power and John Reilly, while Hugh Torney and Peter Stewart managed to escape.

== Reputation ==
Steenson was viewed highly in the movement with Brown calling him a "committed and highly efficient military activist and a dedicated revolutionary". However he was described by Lord Justice Carswell as "a most dangerous and sinister terrorist. A ruthless and highly dedicated, resourceful and indefatigable planner of criminal exploits who did not hesitate to take a leading role in assassinations and other crimes". Henry McDonald and Jack Holland write "Both his friends and enemies spoke in a tone of awestruck at his paramilitary abilities". Ken Wharton refers to him as a "notorious psychopath". Sean O'Callaghan describes Steenson as someone who "never took to orders".

Terry George wrote of him that he "was extremely clever and even wittier than Billy McMillan. He had an angelic face and women adored him. He was also ruthless, cunning and fearless.".

== Death ==
On 14 March 1987, Steenson and Tony "Boot" McCarthy returned to Ballymurphy after a night of drinking which was cut short by anger over the INLA GHQ faction's show of force in the Divis flats earlier in the day. After bringing their car to a stop on Springhill Avenue, they were killed in an ambush by an INLA active unit, with a member of the ASU closing the security gate at the top of the street to trap the pair. An INLA spokesperson said Steenson was killed for being "actively involved in continuous and concerted efforts to undermine the authority of the ... movement." Jimmy Brown gave the graveside oration.

The IPLO would later kill Emmanuel Gargan in the Hatfield Bar on the Lower Ormeau Road and Kevin Barry Duffy in Armagh in retaliation for the killing of Steenson. The IPLO would draw the ire of the Lower Ormeau community through the circumstances surrounding the killing of Gargan, with graffiti appearing in the area labelled "IPLOscum"

On Halloween 1992, the Provisional IRA would carry out a large-scale operation (dubbed the "Night of Long Knives") with the goal of neutralising the IPLO. Following the operation and execution of Jimmy Brown, both the Belfast Brigade and Army Council factions disbanded.

== See also ==
- "The Troubles"
- The Anglo-Irish Agreement
- Irish People's Liberation Organisation
