= Revolutionary Struggle (Ireland) =

Revolutionary Struggle was a small militant Irish Althusserian group active in Dublin from 1975 until 1985. It produced a quarterly magazine entitled The Ripening of Time which provided a Marxist–Leninist analysis of the political situation in Ireland. The group was led by Michael Youlton, a man known as "Mick the Greek", and was heavily influenced by Italian groups such as the Red Brigades and Prima Linea.

Members of the group were involved in various causes and campaigns in the early 1980s, working with local campaign groups such as the Anti Amendment Campaign that campaigned against the pro-life amendment to the Irish Constitution.

In 1981, the group shot British Leyland executive Geoffrey Armstrong three times in the legs in what was claimed as revenge for the 1981 Irish hunger strike in which seven Provisional IRA and three INLA volunteers died. The shooting took place in front of a packed lecture hall in Trinity College, Dublin. Irish investigative journalist Frank Connolly was arrested over the shooting but later released without charge. Two years later, an Italian man named Giovanni Marriotti was convicted of carrying out the shooting. In his statement to Gardaí he claimed that Revolutionary Struggle activists had planned the attack and supplied the weapons.

Jimmy Brown became associated with the group after he left the INLA/IRSP in the mid-80's. The group split up and dissolved by 1985 following internal disputes resulting in many members, including Terry Moore (sister of singer/songwriter Christy Moore) and Sean Murphy, going on to join Sinn Féin. Jimmy Brown went on to found the IPLO in 1986 and was shot dead in an internal feud in 1992.
