= Harry's Game =

British TV mini-series

- Genre: Spy thriller
- Based on: Harry's Game by Gerald Seymour
- Directed by: Lawrence Gordon Clark
- Starring: Ray Lonnen; Derek Thompson
- Theme music composer: Clannad
- Country of origin: United Kingdom
- Original language: English
- No. of episodes: 3

Production
- Producers: David Cunliffe and Keith Richardson
- Running time: approx 53 mins per episode (2 hr 40 min)

Original release
- Network: ITV
- Release: 25 October – 27 October 1982

Harry's Game is a British three-part television drama made by Yorkshire Television for ITV in 1982, closely based on the 1975 novel Harry's Game by Gerald Seymour, a journalist. Apart from brief scenes in London, it is set in and around Belfast during the Troubles.

Its lead actors were Ray Lonnen, Derek Thompson and Benjamin Whitrow. The series was well received, and added to the channel's reputation for producing quality TV drama.

The drama is noted for its closing music, "Theme from Harry's Game", by the Irish musical group Clannad. The music was used in trailers and later commercially released, reaching the top five of Irish and British singles charts, bringing the band its first major international exposure. The drama, filmed in West Yorkshire, Northern Ireland and the Republic of Ireland has been released under five other names in other countries.

== Synopsis ==
The British government cabinet minister Henry Danby is killed by an IRA gunman, Billy Downes, in front of his wife and children outside his home in London. Downes then escapes to Belfast. Army officer Harry Brown is sent undercover into Belfast's Catholic community to track down the assassin. Brown is chosen for the mission because he is an Ulsterman who has previously done similar work in Oman.

Given the cover identity of merchant seaman Harry McEvoy, he finds lodgings in the Falls Road area and secures a job in a scrapyard. He dates a Catholic, Josephine Laverty, and unknowingly encounters Downes in a local club, which is raided by the British Army. A British soldier recognises Harry but ignores him and arrests Downes, who is interrogated but set free. Harry tips off his superiors that the killer was at the club and that Theresa, a girl at whose family home Billy stayed the night while on the run, knows his name. Theresa is arrested, but caught between the police interrogator Rennie and her fear of the IRA if she talks, she hangs herself in prison without revealing Downes' identity. When Josephine realises that Harry must have passed on the information about Theresa, she tells him to leave while he can, but he refuses, saying Danby's killer cannot be allowed to get away with the murder.

At a restaurant in Belfast, a waiter overhears two senior army officers discussing Harry's presence in the city, and passes this information on to the IRA. The local IRA leaders start checking all new arrivals, including Harry.

The IRA start to hunt Harry down. With two other gunmen, Downes ambushes Harry, who shoots the gunmen and forces a passing driver to chase their car as Downes escapes. Harry follows Downes to his own home, which is under surveillance by the army. Harry shoots Downes in the street in front of his wife before being shot himself by the soldiers watching the house, believing Harry to be a member of the IRA. Injured and bleeding in the street, Harry is confronted by Downes's wife, who then shoots him in the head using Harry's own revolver.

The series closes with a female narrator reading a part of a poem written by the daughter of real-life IRA victim William J. Staunton, a 46-year-old magistrate shot dead in 1973: "Don't cry, Mummy said. They're not real, but Daddy was, and he's not here. Don't be bitter, Mummy said. They've hurt themselves much more. They can walk and run, Daddy can't."

== Cast ==
- Ray Lonnen as Harry Brown
- Benjamin Whitrow as Davidson
- Nicholas Day as Bannen
- Geoffrey Chater as Col. George Frost
- Sean Caffrey as Insp. Howard Rennie
- Derek Thompson as Billy Downes
- Ian Bleasdale as Waiter
- Tony Rohr as IRA Brigade Commander
- Gil Brailey as Josephine Laverty
- Linda Robson as Theresa McCorrigan
- Charles Lawson as Seamus Duffryn

== Production ==
=== Locations ===
Most of the filming was done in Leeds, in Yorkshire, England, on now-demolished housing of Meanwood and at Leeds Studios. This stood in for Belfast.

Other footage, filmed in Ireland, includes shots of the Falls Road, broader views (as where Harry is frisked on entry to Belfast city centre - there was a permanent checkpoint for pedestrians there for many years) and the final scenes overlooking the cityscape which, were filmed in Holywood, County Down and close to the military/MI5 barracks. Scenes were also filmed in South County Dublin including in Ballybrack.

=== Music ===
Clannad's closing music became an international breakthrough. Incidental music was sampled or created by Mike Moran. Additionally, the music found continued success through a sample used in the hit single "Saltwater" by the musician Chicane.

== Broadcast and distribution history ==
The series screened on the ITV network as three 52-to-54 minute episodes over consecutive nights from 25 to 27 October 1982, and was later edited into a single 130-minute programme titled Harry's Game – The Movie.

Outside of Britain and Ireland...

- The film was not widely seen in the US or widely available on video; it was sold in Canada with the title Belfast Assassin. The original, unedited three-part serial was released on DVD in the United Kingdom in 2005.
- The box set of DVDs has been distributed in the Netherlands and Belgium.
- In Finland it has been presented as Ajojahti (Chasing) and Vastaisku (Retaliation).
- In France Harry's Game was released in 2008. Its DVD bears title Le tueur de Belfast (The Belfast Killer).
- In Germany it was released before unification of Germany as Das tödliche Patt (The Deadly Stalemate).
- In Denmark it was broadcast on national television in 1983 as Livsfarligt spil (Lethal Game).

== Character redeployment ==
Rennie appears in Seymour's other books The Journeyman Tailor and Field of Blood (and screen adaptation The Informant).
