= Harry Kirkpatrick =

Irish republican and supergrass

Henry Kirkpatrick (born c. 1958) is a former Irish National Liberation Army member turned informer against other members of the INLA.

== Arrest ==
In February 1983, Kirkpatrick was arrested on multiple charges including the murder of two policemen, two Ulster Defence Regiment soldiers, and Hugh McGinn, a member of the Territorial Army.

Following his segregation from other Republican prisoners, the INLA kidnapped his wife Elizabeth, in order to expose a deal they believed he was making with the Special Branch. They would later kidnap his sister and his stepfather too. All were released unharmed. INLA Chief of Staff Dominic McGlinchey is supposed to have carried out the execution of Kirkpatrick's lifelong friend Gerard 'Sparky' Barkley because it was believed that he may have revealed the whereabouts of the Kirkpatrick family members to the police.

Despite the kidnap, in May 1983, ten men were charged with various offences based on evidence from Kirkpatrick. Those charged included Irish Republican Socialist Party vice-chairman Kevin McQuillan and former councillor Sean Flynn. IRSP chairman James Brown was charged with the murder of a police officer. Others escaped; Jim Barr, an IRSP member named by Kirkpatrick as part of the INLA, fled to the USA where, having spent 17 months in jail, he won political asylum in 1993.

27 people were convicted based on Kirkpatrick's statements in December 1985. 24 of these would have their convictions overturned by December 1986. Gerard Steenson was given five life sentences for the deaths of the same five individuals for which Kirkpatrick himself had been convicted. These included UDR soldier Colin Quinn, shot in Belfast in December 1980.

== Aftermath ==
The distrust and division that they sowed were the final act in splitting former comrades into warring factions and leading to the formation of the Irish People's Liberation Organisation and leading to that organization's murderous feud with the INLA in which 16 people were killed.

Kirkpatrick was convicted of murder and sentenced to life imprisonment. It was recommended that he serve ten years, as compared to the then normal tariff of twenty years plus, and now lives under a secret name.

== Sources ==
- McDonald, Henry; Holland, Jack (1994). INLA – Deadly divisions. Dublin: Torc. ISBN 189814205X.
