= Misogyny: The World's Oldest Prejudice =

2006 nonfiction book by Jack Holland

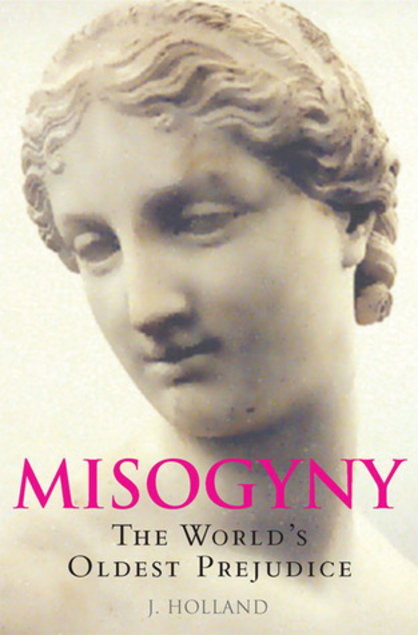
- Author: Jack Holland
- Language: English
- Genre: Nonfiction
- Publisher: Carroll & Graf Publishers
- Publication date: 2006
- ISBN: 9780786718238

Misogyny: The World's Oldest Prejudice is a book by Jack Holland, first published posthumously in 2006 by Carroll & Graf Publishers. The work provides a comprehensive historical analysis of misogyny, defined as the contempt and hatred of women, and its pervasive presence across cultures and time periods. Holland explores the roots, manifestations, and consequences of misogyny, offering a detailed roadmap of female oppression throughout history.

== Summary of contents ==
The book is structured into eight chapters that trace misogyny from ancient civilizations to modern times. Holland examines key historical events, religious doctrines, philosophical ideas, and cultural practices that have contributed to the systematic dehumanization of women. The book covers topics such as:

- The ancient origins of misogyny. Misogynistic ideas in Greek and Roman societies, such as Aristotle's view of women as "deformed males" and mythological portrayals like Pandora's box.
- Religious influence. The role of Christianity and other religions in perpetuating misogynistic attitudes, including the doctrine of Original Sin being Eve's fault and the veneration/demonization paradox.
- Witch hunts. The brutal persecution of women during the 15th to 18th centuries.
- Modern misogyny. Contemporary issues such as body politics, gender inequality, and the disproportionate impact of war, famine, and disease on women.

Holland argues that misogyny not only degrades but paradoxically exalts women in ways that ultimately dehumanize them.

== Critical reception ==
Before publishing, the book was considered controversial and was abandoned by its initial publisher, Viking Penguin. Writing for the Journal of the Association for Research on Mothering, Stephanie Knaak makes the case that while the book is an excellent educational resource, its limited focus on motherhood may disappoint readers seeking a deeper exploration of this aspect of women's experiences.
