= Seán Mackin (Irish republican) =

Irish republican

Seán Mackin is an Irish republican from Belfast, Northern Ireland and a fundraiser for the Friends of Sinn Féin (FOSF). Mackin, who had been a member of the Irish Republican Socialist Party, the political wing of the Irish National Liberation Army, left Belfast for the United States in the 1980s. After being arrested in the US, he applied for political asylum, alleging harassment and threats from the security forces in Northern Ireland. Mackin was also reportedly under threat from a murderous internal feud within the INLA. A US immigration judge granted Mackin's wife and daughter political asylum in 1992.

Seán Mackin was not granted asylum (as is sometimes misreported) but was granted "suspension of deportation," a different route to permanent residency and U.S. citizenship. The Mackins also have two sons, who are both United States citizens by birth. The entire family have since become United States citizens. In 2004, Mackin was detained by police while visiting Belfast and questioned about the death of a part-time Royal Ulster Constabulary officer in 1983. Some members of Sinn Féin suggested that this police action was an attempt to disrupt Sinn Féin's fundraising efforts in the US.
