= Sammy Ward =

Irish republican and IPLO leader

- Born: Samuel Ward; 1963; Short Strand, Belfast, Northern Ireland
- Died: 31 October 1992 (aged 30); Beechfield Street, Short Strand, Belfast, Northern Ireland
- Cause of death: Murder by shooting
- Organisations: Irish People's Liberation Organisation; Irish People's Liberation Organisation - Belfast Brigade

Samuel Ward (c. 1963 – 31 October 1992) was the leader of the Irish People's Liberation Organisation's Belfast Brigade. The IPLO was formed in 1986 by disaffected and expelled members of the Irish National Liberation Army. Following its split from and feud with the INLA, the IPLO split into two factions: the 'Army Council' (led by Jimmy Brown) and the 'Belfast Brigade' (led by Ward).

During its Halloween 1992 purge of the IPLO (dubbed the "Night of Long Knives"), the Provisional IRA shot and killed Ward while he was inside the Seán Martin GAA club on Beechfield Street in the Short Strand area of Belfast. Following this large-scale operation by the Provisionals, both factions of the IPLO surrendered and disbanded.

== Sources ==
- Henry McDonald, INLA - Deadly Divisions, Paperback: 469 pages; Poolbeg Press Ltd (April 26, 2010); ISBN 1-84223-438-2; ISBN 978-1-84223-438-9
