= Republican Socialist Collective =

- Leader: Jimmy Brown
- Founder: Jimmy Brown; Gerard Steenson; Martin 'Rook' O'Prey
- Founded: 1986
- Dissolved: 1992
- Split from: Irish Republican Socialist Party
- Newspaper: Socialist Republican
- Paramilitary wing: Irish People's Liberation Organisation
- Ideology: Irish Republicanism; Revolutionary socialism
- Political position: Far-left

The Republican Socialist Collective was a fringe Irish republican political group in Northern Ireland formed in 1986. The RSC was formed at the behest of Jimmy Brown to serve as the political arm of the Irish People's Liberation Organisation, a splinter group of the Irish National Liberation Army formed by Gerard Steenson, Jimmy Brown and Martin 'Rook' O'Prey. Ideologically the group endorsed a militant brand of revolutionary socialism.

Although the party did not take part in any elections it did organise a number of public meetings and debates in Belfast and Newry. It was disestablished at the end of October 1992 when the Provisional IRA eliminated the IPLO, whilst Brown was killed earlier in August by a rival faction within the IPLO shortly before an internal feud began.

The group also published a quarterly newspaper called the Socialist Republican.
