= Charlotte Blease =

Northern Irish philosopher of medicine

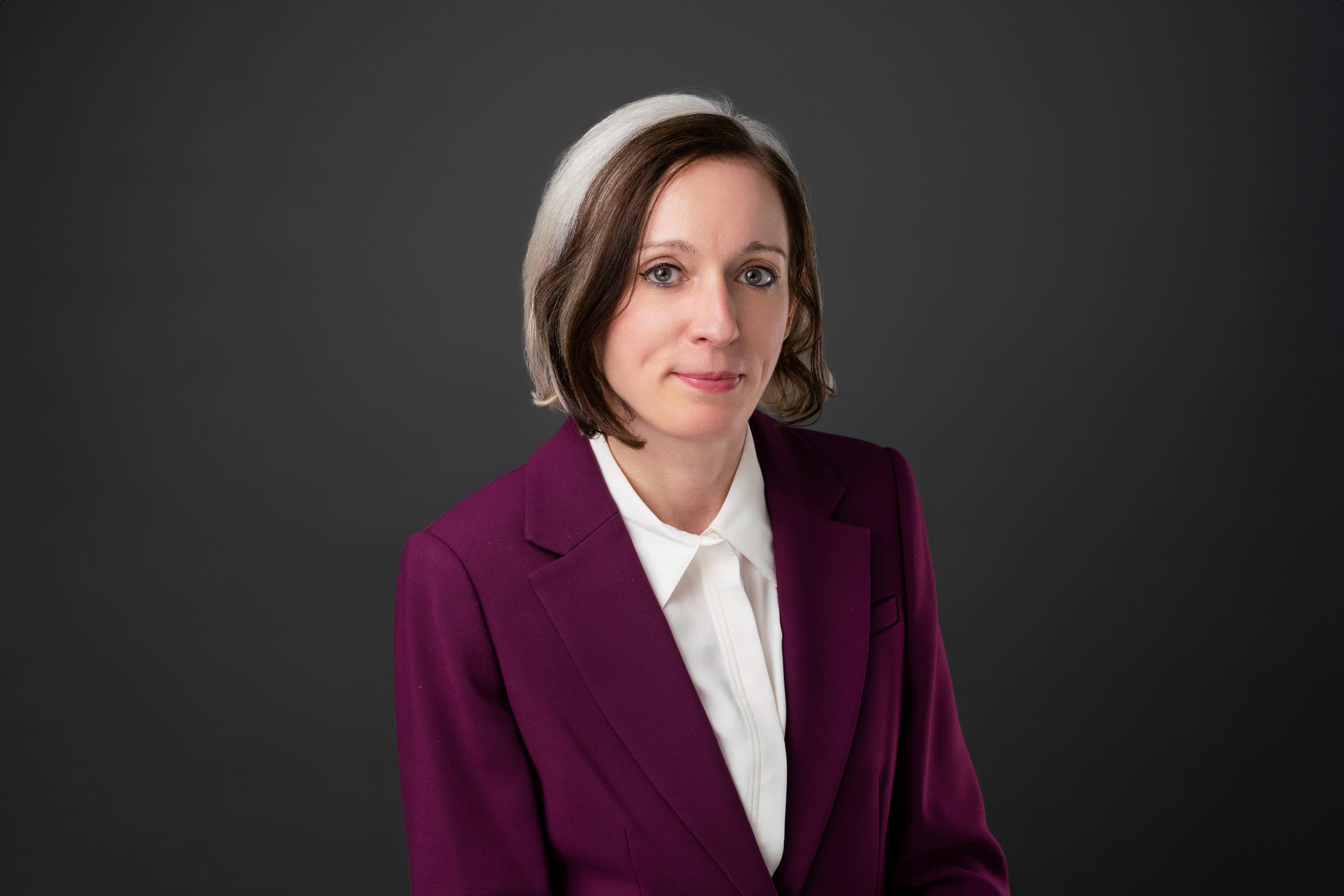

Charlotte Blease is a Northern Irish philosopher of medicine whose research focuses on the ethical, psychological and social dimensions of healthcare innovation, particularly the use of digital and artificial intelligence (AI) technologies in clinical settings. She is currently an Associate Professor (Docent) in the Medical Faculty at Uppsala University in Sweden, and a researcher in the Digital Psychiatry Program at Beth Israel Deaconess Medical Center, Harvard Medical School.

== Career and research ==
Blease studied philosophy of science and mind at Queen’s University Belfast. She has held academic appointments in the United Kingdom, Ireland, Germany, Sweden, and the United States, including a Fulbright Scholarship to the Program in Placebo Studies at Harvard Medical School. She was previously an Irish Research Council fellow and a lecturer at Queen’s University Belfast.

Her early research examined placebo studies, psychotherapy ethics, and the doctor–patient relationship. She is a co-founder of the Society for Interdisciplinary Placebo Studies. In recent years, her work has shifted toward the implications of AI in healthcare, including studies on the clinical integration of generative AI, patient access to digital health records, and the future of medical professionalism.

Blease’s writing spans peer-reviewed articles and public commentary, and she has contributed to discussions on ethical AI use in healthcare through both academic forums and policy-oriented platforms. She regularly speaks on issues related to transparency, accountability, and human–AI collaboration in medicine.

She is the author of two books. The Nocebo Effect, Mayo Clinic Press in 2024, explores how negative expectations and clinical communication can inadvertently contribute to patient harm. Her second book, Dr Bot: Why Doctors Can Fail Us – and How AI Could Save Lives is published by Yale University Press in 2025. It examines the limitations of human clinical judgment and the potential role of artificial intelligence in improving healthcare delivery.

== Advocacy and public engagement ==
Blease has advocated for the teaching of philosophy in schools in both Northern Ireland and the Republic of Ireland. In 2016, she was appointed a Patron of SAPERE, the UK’s leading educational charity for philosophy for children—alongside Stephen Fry and Lord Neuberger.

In 2012, she was selected as one of the winners of the BBC and Arts and Humanities Research Council’s New Generation Thinkers competition.

== Personal life ==
Blease's late partner, journalist and Ireland Editor of The Guardian, Henry McDonald, died of cancer in 2023. She wrote about this experience and its connection to digital health records for The Guardian. Her father, Victor Blease, was the former Chief Executive of the Northern Ireland Housing Executive. Her grandfather was trade unionist Billy Blease.
