= Irish People's Liberation Organisation =

Former Irish Republican paramilitary group

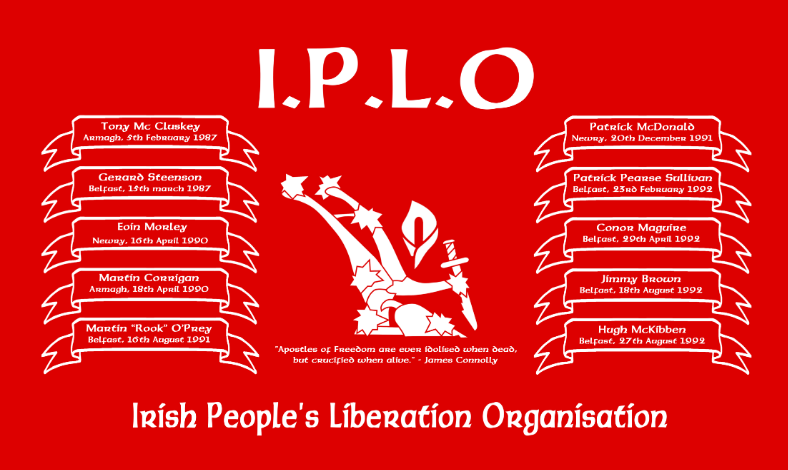
- Commemorative flag of the IPLO.
- Leaders: Jimmy Brown, Gerard Steenson; Sammy Ward (IPLOBB Leader), Martin O'Prey
- Dates active: 1986 – May 1992
- Split from: Irish National Liberation Army
- Group: Republican Socialist Collective (political wing)
- Active regions: Ireland
- Ideology: Irish republicanism Left-wing nationalism Revolutionary socialism
- Size: 150–200
- Wars: the Troubles

The Irish People's Liberation Organisation was a small Irish socialist republican paramilitary organisation formed in 1986 by disaffected and expelled members of the Irish National Liberation Army (INLA), whose factions coalesced in the aftermath of the supergrass trials. It developed a reputation for intra-republican and sectarian violence as well as criminality, before being forcibly disbanded by the Provisional Irish Republican Army (IRA) in 1992.

Some of the IPLO's most notable attacks during its short existence were:

- the Orange Cross shooting in which IPLO gunmen killed a member of the Red Hand Commando and injured an Ulster Defence Regiment soldier;
- the 1991 Donegall Arms shooting when they fired indiscriminately on a Protestant-owned pub, killing two Protestant civilians and injuring four others; and
- the assassination of outspoken loyalist politician and Ulster Volunteer Force (UVF) member George Seawright in November 1987.

On 1 May 1990 the IPLO became a proscribed organisation by the British government. Although officially disbanded, the IPLO retains that classification under the Terrorism Act 2000.

== Foundation ==
The IPLO emerged from a split within the INLA. After the 1981 Irish hunger strike, in which three of its members died, the INLA began to break apart. The INLA virtually dissolved as a coherent force in the mid-1980s. Factions associated with Belfast and Dublin fell into dispute with each other. When INLA man Harry Kirkpatrick turned supergrass, he implicated many of his former comrades in various activities and many of them were convicted on his testimony.

Members both inside and out of prison broke away from the INLA and set up the IPLO. Some key players at the outset were Tom McAllister, Gerard Steenson, Jimmy Brown and Martin "Rook" O'Prey. Jimmy Brown formed a minor political group, known as the Republican Socialist Collective, which was to act as the political wing of the IPLO.

The IPLO's initial priority was to forcibly disband the Irish Republican Socialist Movement from which it had split, and most of its early attacks reflected this, being more frequently against former comrades than on the security forces. The feud with the INLA lasted from 1986 to 1987 and resulted in the deaths of 12 people including IPLO leader Gerard Steenson who was shot in March 1987.

== Internal feud ==
The IPLO was accused of becoming involved in the illegal drug trade, especially in ecstasy. Some of its Belfast members were also accused of the prolonged gang rape of a North Down woman in Divis Flats in 1990. Many of its recruits had fallen out of favour with the IRA and the portents for its future were not good. Sammy Ward, a low-level IPLO member, broke away from the main body of the organisation with a few supporters when the IPLO were severely depleted and weak in Belfast. His faction attacked the rest of the IPLO, culminating in the killing of Jimmy Brown. A full-scale feud followed between two factions terming themselves "Army Council" (formerly led by Jimmy Brown) and "Belfast Brigade" (led by Ward), which led to the 3000th killing of the Troubles, Hugh McKibben, a 21-year-old "Army Council" man. Brown had been the previous victim when he was shot dead in West Belfast on 18 August 1992. This feud was described by the IPLO's critics as a lethal squabble over money and drugs.

== Disbandment ==
The Provisional IRA – by far the largest armed republican group in Ireland – decided to attack and remove the IPLO, given its involvement in the drug trade and due to increasingly provocative actions by the IPLO towards the Provisional IRA. On Saturday 31 October 1992, in an event that was later dubbed "Night of the Long Knives" by locals in Belfast, the IRA attacked the two IPLO factions in Belfast, killing the breakaway Belfast Brigade leader Sammy Ward in the Short Strand. There were also raids on pubs and clubs where IPLO members were kneecapped. On 2 November 1992 the second-in-command of the IPLO Belfast Brigade formally surrendered to the Provisional IRA Belfast Brigade adjutant, which brought an end to the group in Belfast.

Outside Belfast the IRA did not attack any IPLO units and issued statements absolving the IPLO units in Derry, Newry and Armagh from any involvement in the drugs trade that was alleged against those in Belfast. In Dublin the IRA reprieved the IPLO Chief of Staff in return for surrendering a small cache of arms held in Ballybough.

The IPLO also had a presence in Strabane, and in Munster; like the INLA drawing its support from the Cork, Limerick, and Shannon areas. Reportedly the group had also established small support bases in Continental Europe including France, Belgium, and the Netherlands.

== Casualties ==
According to the Sutton database of deaths at the University of Ulster's CAIN project, the IPLO was responsible for 22 killings during the Troubles. Among its victims were 10 civilians, six INLA members, four loyalist paramilitary figures, a Royal Navy reservist, and one member of the British security forces, a Royal Ulster Constabulary constable.

== List of attacks and actions ==
=== 1986 ===
- Autumn – Former INLA Volunteers led by Jimmy Brown broke away to form the Irish People's Liberation Army (IPLA) which was later renamed the Irish People's Liberation Organisation (IPLO). They also set up a small political wing called the Republican Socialist Collective (RSC).
- 10 November – Off-duty RUC officer Derek Patterson was shot dead by the IPLO on Fitzroy Avenue, off the Ormeau Road, Belfast. Both the IRA and later the INLA tried to claim responsibility.
- 29 November – The IPLO launched a hand grenade attack on Queen Street RUC station in Belfast injuring six RUC constables. Several shots were also fired. Responsibility for the attack and the shooting of Constable Patterson was claimed by the "People's Liberation Army" (PLA).
- 21 December – Thomas McCartan (31), a member of the INLA, was shot dead by the Irish People's Liberation Organisation in Andersonstown. This was the first killing in an INLA-IPLO feud that was to last until March 1987. The IPLO used the alias "INLA Army Council" to claim responsibility for actions carried out during the feud. However, in the case of McCartan callers representing the Irish People's Liberation Organisation claimed responsibility for the killing shortly afterwards, accusing him of "abusing the republican struggle for his own selfish ends."

=== 1987 ===
- 20 January – Rosnaree Hotel shooting: The IPLO killed two leading members of the INLA (Thomas "Ta" Power and John O'Reilly), they shot them inside a hotel in Drogheda, County Louth.
- 28 January – The IPLO tried to kill INLA member Emmanuel Gargan in the Lower Ormeau, Belfast. He was wounded in another attempt two days later.
- 18 February – The IPLO shot dead INLA Volunteer Michael Kearney near his home in Ballymurphy, Belfast.
- 10 March – The IPLO shot and wounded the chairman of the IRSP Kevin "Bap" McQuillan at his home in Springfield Park, Belfast. His brother was also wounded in the attack.
- 21 March – The IPLO shot dead INLA Volunteer Emmanuel Gargan on the Ormeau Road in Belfast.
- 22 March – The IPLO shot dead INLA Volunteer Kevin Duffy. His body was found in the playground of St. Brigid's School, Nursery Road, Armagh. This was the last killing of the IPLO/INLA feud.
- 27 September – An IPLO member in Newry, County Down, accidentally shot dead his friend (Kevin Keenan) in his apartment with a handgun he believed was unloaded.
- 19 November – George Seawright a Loyalist politician known for his anti-Catholic views was shot by the IPLO on the Shankill Road, Belfast. He died of his wounds two weeks later on December 3. After his death it was also revealed he was a UVF member.
- 19 November – The IPLO shot and injured a woodwork instructor in County Armagh. The IPLO claimed the man was a member of the UDR but he had no ties to the security forces.

=== 1988 ===
- 5 January – The IPLO shot and wounded a Catholic man in Armagh.
- 3 March – The IPLO fired several shots and lobbed a grenade at an observation sangar at Musgrave Street RUC base in Belfast city centre.
- 10 March – The IPLO shot and wounded a guard during the robbery of a cash-in-transit van at a bank in Bangor, County Down. A woman in the vicinity was also hit in the leg.
- 9 August – The IPLO sent a 5 lb (2.3 kg) parcel bomb to the home of Unionist politician William McCrea but the bomb was defused.
- 9 August – The IPLO lured a Loyalist to a house on Cliftonville Road, Belfast where an assassination attempt failed when a gun jammed.
- 11 August – The IPLO mounted two gun attacks against the RUC and British Army in Belfast; attacking a joint patrol in Grosvenor Road and exchanging fire with British soldiers at Divis Flats.
- 12 August – IPLO members loaded a van with explosives and forced its owner to drive to the Belfast law courts, where the bomb exploded.
- 12 August – The IPLO carried out an attempted bombing of a home it claimed was used as a meeting place by Loyalist paramilitaries in East Belfast. The device was defused.
- 19 August – A parcel bomb was sent to the home of Unionist MP Ken Maginnis.
- 7 September – UDA Volunteer William Quee was shot and killed by the IPLO at his shop in Oldpark Road, Belfast.
- 3 October – The IPLO shot dead Henry McNamee at his girlfriend's home at Lenadoon Avenue, Belfast, afterwards claiming he was an informer. Apparently, the IPLO had instructed McNamee to pose as an informer in 1987 so the IPLO could kill his RUC handler. This planned ambush failed to materialise and McNamee moved to London.
- 22 December – The IPLO hijacked a taxi in West Belfast and forced the driver to carry a device consisting of two full gas cylinders wrapped in detonating cord to an unknown target. However, the taxi ran out of petrol and stopped in North Queen Street in north Belfast, and the British Army carried out a controlled explosion on the vehicle. The RUC claimed a massive fireball would have erupted had the device detonated.

=== 1989 ===
- 16 February – Orange Cross Social Club shooting: The IPLO attacked a pub on the predominantly Protestant Shankill Road, Belfast, killing Red Hand Commando (RHC) member Stephen McRea and injuring several people. A gunman opened fire indiscriminately with an Uzi submachine gun. Authors Jack Holland and Henry McDonald alleged the Belfast leadership of the Ulster Volunteer Force (UVF) were holding a meeting upstairs at the time of the attack.
- 2 March – An IPLO member, Declan Malone, shot dead Patrick Boland in a freelance contract killing in the O'Malley Park estate in Southill, Limerick. He had been hired by the victim's wife, Majella Keane, whom Patrick had been violently abusive towards.
- 27 May – A joint RUC/British Army patrol stopped and searched three IPLO members in the Daisy Hill area of Newry. One of them drew a handgun and pointed it at soldiers, but ran. A search of the vicinity recovered two handguns and paramilitary clothing.
- 1 June – The IPLO shot and wounded an RUC officer and a British soldier in a gun attack on a joint RUC/British Army patrol in the Derrybeg estate, Newry.
- 22 August – The IPLO claimed responsibility for several incendiary devices planted in business premises in Belfast; one bomb was defused inside a department store in Belfast city centre and two more were found and defused in a large DIY shop in Newtownabbey. A fourth device found at the terminal building of the city's airport caused disruption to flights.
- 3 September – The IPLO reportedly issued a death threat to dole fraud investigators in the Ballyfermot area of Dublin. The Sunday World received the threat from a caller using a recognised codeword who claimed "As an army of the working classes we see it as our duty to protect them from these dole-snoops". The IPLO later denied issuing the threat.
- 6 November – The IPLO shot dead a Catholic civilian, Robbert Burns, near his home in Milltown Avenue, County Antrim, mistaken for a security forces member.
- 10 December – Two IPLO members shot and injured a gendarme in the Belgian port of Antwerp and escaped on foot. They had been intending to smuggle a small consignment of arms aboard a freighter bound for Ireland. Afterwards, Dutch police carried out raids on four homes and arrested an Irish citizen in Amsterdam.

=== 1990 ===
- 14 March – The IPLO attempted to assassinate a prominent Loyalist at Derrycoole Way, Newtownabbey, on the outskirts of Belfast. After he failed to appear, the IPLO members opened fire on RUC officers and UDR soldiers on Roden Street as they returned to West Belfast.
- 20 March – William McClure a Protestant civilian was shot dead at his Belfast home by an IPLO hit squad. The IPLO claimed he was a member of the UVF. McClure was convicted in 1974 for possession of a firearm but it was unknown if he still retained links with loyalist paramilitaries.
- 28 March – The IPLO became a proscribed organization in Northern Ireland.
- 18 April – An IPLO unit was ambushed by undercover British soldiers as they tried to attack a local RUC man in South Armagh. A gun battle ensued and the commander of the IPLO unit and former Provisional IRA volunteer Martin Corrigan was killed.
- 20 May – Two IPLO members, one of them armed, forced their way into a home on Faith Avenue in the East Wall area of Dublin. The IPLO claimed the owner, who was absent, had sexually abused children in the area and they had been intending to "punish" him.
- 15 July – The IPLO shot dead William Sloss a Protestant civilian in his home in South Belfast. A caller to the BBC in Belfast claimed the IPLO shot William Sloss because he was a member of the UVF. Allegedly, Sloss was a drug dealer who had fallen out with Loyalist paramilitaries, who helped arrange his killing.
- 1 August – An IPLO unit tried to kill leading Loyalist "Chuck" Berry but failed.
- 11 September – The IPLO was behind the shooting and injuring of a Protestant civilian on the Shankill Road, Belfast.
- 18 December – An IPLO bomb exploded as a man opened the bonnet of his car in the Low Road area of Lisburn, throwing him several metres away but he survived with "superficial" injuries. A former UDR soldier was believed to be the intended target.

=== 1991 ===
- 1 January – The IPLO shot and wounded an RUC Reserve officer in Dundrod, County Antrim.
- 20 April – An IPLO Volunteer lost three fingers after a botched hand grenade attack on Bessbrook RUC station.
- 5 June – An IPLO hit team shot and injured Eddie McIlwaine, a former Ulster Defence Regiment soldier and member of the notorious Shankill Butchers, while he was driving a taxi at Lower North Street in Belfast city centre. The IPLO unit chased the taxi and fired several more shots, hitting McIlwaine twice more and slightly injuring a 15-year old-girl.
- 16 July – Three armed men sought a person in St. Joseph’s Mansions in north Dublin. After failing to find them, one of the frustrated gang members fired his shotgun at a group of women nearby. The four, including a 13-year-old girl, were hit by shotgun pellets. Gardaí linked this incident to the IPLO.
- 18 July – The IPLO shot dead an off duty member of the Royal Naval Reserve (John McMaster) at his shop in Church Lane, Belfast.
- 16 August: The UVF shot dead IPLO member Martin "Rook" O'Prey at his home on Ardmoulin Terrace, Belfast. His seven-year-old daughter was injured in the attack.
- 3 September – The IPLO shot and wounded a Protestant civilian from a passing car in North Belfast.
- 13 September – The IPLO wounded a man working at his car repair shop in north Belfast.
- 7 October – An IPLO unit fired several shots into the Ivy Bar in the Donegall Pass area of Belfast with a submachine gun, injuring 2 people.
- 10 October – An IPLO active service unit carried out a gun attack on the Diamond Jubilee Bar on the Shankill Road Belfast, killing a UDA Volunteer Harry Ward and injuring several people. Their target was a well-known Loyalist but he wasn't present.
- 10 October – The IPLO shot and injured a Protestant civilian at his home in Newry.
- 12 October – The IPLO claimed responsibility for bombing the Derby House bar on Stewartstown Road, west Belfast. Armed men had entered the premises at midday and left a device; the explosion caused severe damage. Afterwards the IPLO warned that pubs that did not prevent drug abuse on their premises would be targeted.
- 24 October – A Protestant man escaped four IPLO gunmen who had forcibly entered his home off Cavehill Road in North Belfast. He leapt through a window, breaking his arm.
- 12 December – The IPLO carried out a firebombing attack on a veterinary surgery in Newry claiming it served the British Army. The allegation was denied.
- 15 December – The IPLO shot dead a Catholic civilian Colm Mahon at his workplace on Little Donegal Street, Belfast. Christopher "Crip" McWilliams was convicted of this murder, in 1997 after McWilliams had rejoined the INLA he shot dead LVF leader Billy Wright inside the Maze Prison.
- 20 December – An IPLO member (Patrick McDonald) was shot dead in his salon at St Aidan's Park Road, Marino, Dublin. Although the IPLO promised retaliation, the perpetrator and motive was unclear. Some media reports said the killing was a reprisal for an incident on July 16 in north inner city Dublin, to which McDonald was linked by Gardaí.
- 21 December – The IPLO shot dead two Protestant civilians (Barry Watson and Thomas Gorman) during a gun attack carried out on the Donegall Arms pub in Roden Street, Village, Belfast. Witnesses said the gunmen shouted "Orange bastards, Orange bastards!" during the attack.

=== 1992 ===
- 17 February – The IPLO shot dead a Protestant civilian at his workplace in Upper Crumlin Road, Belfast.
- 12 April – The IPLO issued a death threat to Irish soccer player David O'Leary and the Football Association of Ireland declaring him and his family "legitimate target[s]". The IPLO threat alleged O'Leary, then living in England, was a supporter of the Conservative Party. After widespread condemnation the IPLO denied sending the threat although the letter contained a recognised codeword.
- 5 May – The IPLO shot dead a Protestant civilian during a gun attack on the Mount Inn pub, North Queen Street, Belfast. The IPLO claimed the attack was revenge for the killing of one of their own Volunteers six days earlier by the Ulster Volunteer Force.
- June – An armed IPLO unit led by Sammy Ward burst into a pub in Belfast on the Antrim Road and read out a statement which said in part "the IPLO would not take Provo aggression lying down". Several members of the IRA were drinking in the pub at the time. This led to further tension between the IPLO and the IRA.
- 19 June – The IPLO claimed responsibility for a gun attack on a Protestant man driving along the Upper Crumlin Road, Belfast. His common law wife and daughter were also in the vehicle but there were no reported injuries.
- 19 July – The IPLO in Dublin issued a threat to "seek out and kill" anyone from the Republic who joined the new British Army Royal Irish Regiment
- 8 August – The IPLO hurled an explosive device at an occupied house in Sherbrook Terrace in the Shankill area of Belfast. The bomb exploded outside damaging several houses. The IPLO claimed it was retaliation for a UDA shooting and grenade attack on Catholic homes off the Grosvenor Road nine days earlier.
- 18 August – Leading IPLO member Jimmy Brown was shot dead by the IPLO Belfast Brigade. This was the start of an internal IPLO feud. Dozens of shootings, robberies, and takeovers of clubs and bars occurred in the following weeks.
- 20 August – The IPLO shot and seriously injured a security guard at his home in Bessbrook, County Armagh. He was targeted because the firm he worked for had been guarding Newry courthouse, damaged in an IRA bomb attack.
- 25 August – A leading member of the IPLO Belfast Brigade was shot and injured in an ambush by the IPLO Army Council faction in the Springfield Road area of Belfast.
- 27 August – Hugh McKibben, a member of the IPLO Army Council, was shot dead at the Lámh Dhearg GAA social club on the outskirts of Belfast. His was killed by the IPLO Belfast Brigade during an internal IPLO feud. Two other men were wounded in the attack.
- 11 September – Michael Macklin was shot dead in the Whiterock area of west Belfast. A Dublin-based IPLO faction accused him of being involved in the 'Belfast Brigade of the IPLO' a breakaway faction responsible for the killing of both Hugh McKibben and Jimmy Brown.
- 18 September – A man was shot and injured when gunmen opened fire on his car in the Divis Flats area of Belfast. Related to an internal IPLO feud.
- 20 September – The IPLO firebombed a pub in Belfast City Centre called "The Waterfront". The pub was firebombed because it failed to pay money to the IPLO through extortion. This was one of the last actions carried out by the paramilitary group during a six-year campaign.
- 30 September – A former IRA prisoner was shot and wounded when gunmen, believed to IPLO members, fired into the living room of his home in the New Lodge area of Belfast. Related to an internal IPLO feud.
- 24 October – The IPLO claimed responsibility for a shooting attack on British security forces outside Newry RUC station. At least one round struck a security barrier and three young women in a car narrowly escaped injury. A parked civilian vehicle was also hit.
- 21 November – Armed paramilitaries claiming to be from the IPLO in two separate incidents hijacked taxis in Strabane, County Tyrone, and forced the drivers to abandon hoax bombs at Mourne Bridge and Sion Mills RUC station. At both sites, nearby residents were evacuated while the British Army determined the car bombs were hoaxes. The INLA and IRA denied involvement; both the IRSP and Sinn Féin accused the group of being involved in criminality in the Strabane area.

=== 1997 ===
- 21 April – A group of men claiming to be from the IPLO carried out a robbery on a Credit Union in Newry.

== See also ==
- Darkley killings
- Droppin Well bombing
- South Armagh Republican Action Force
