= 1971 Scottish soldiers' killings =

IRA shooting in Belfast, Northern Ireland

- Part of The Troubles
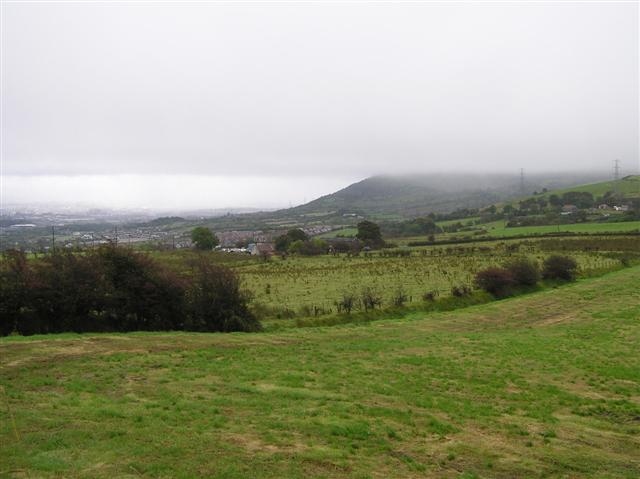
- Location: 54°38′6.46″N 5°59′35.9″W; White Brae, North Belfast, Northern Ireland
- Date: 10 March 1971
- Target: British Army personnel
- Attack type: Shooting
- Deaths: 3
- Perpetrator: Provisional IRA

The 1971 Scottish soldiers' killings took place in Northern Ireland during The Troubles. On 10 March 1971, the Irish Republican Army (IRA) shot dead three off-duty British soldiers of the 1st Battalion, Royal Highland Fusiliers. The soldiers were from Scotland, and two were teenage brothers. They were lured from a pub in Belfast where they had been drinking, driven to a remote location and shot by the roadside. Three British soldiers had been killed before this, but all had died during rioting.

The deaths led to public mourning and protests. Pressure to act spurred a political crisis for the Northern Ireland Government, which led to the resignation of James Chichester-Clark as Prime Minister of Northern Ireland. The British Army raised the minimum age needed to serve in Northern Ireland to 18 in response to this incident. In 2010, a memorial was dedicated to the three soldiers near the site of their deaths.

Three IRA volunteers were later named as being responsible, one of whom was a former British soldier.

== Background ==
British troops had been deployed to Northern Ireland in 1969 as part of Operation Banner, in response to the growing conflict following the 1969 Northern Ireland riots. The British Army became involved in disturbances that culminated in the Falls Curfew of July 1970. The Provisional Irish Republican Army was formed in December 1969 after a split in the IRA. After the split, the Provisional IRA planned for an "all-out offensive action against the British occupation". Provisional IRA Chief of Staff Seán Mac Stíofáin decided they would "escalate, escalate and escalate" until the British agreed to withdraw. The IRA Army Council sanctioned offensive operations against the British Army at the beginning of 1971. Robert Curtis was the first British soldier shot and killed by the Provisional IRA, on 6 February 1971, and two more soldiers were killed over the following month during rioting.

== Killings ==
Brothers John and Joseph McCaig from Ayr and Dougald McCaughey from Glasgow in Scotland (ages 17, 18 and 23) were privates serving with the 1st Battalion, the Royal Highland Fusiliers, stationed at Girdwood Barracks, beside Crumlin Road Prison in north Belfast. On 10 March 1971, the three soldiers had been granted an afternoon pass which allowed them to leave their base. McCaughey's younger brother was serving in the same unit but was on duty and unable to join them. The three soldiers were off-duty, unarmed, and in civilian clothes. They were drinking in "Mooney's", a Belfast city centre pub in Cornmarket, one of the safer areas of the city for soldiers at this stage of the conflict. One report said that the three soldiers were lured into a car by republican women who promised them a party. The three were taken to the White Brae, Squire's Hill, off the Ligoniel Road in north Belfast. There they were shot dead by Provisional IRA volunteers; two in the back of the head and the other in the chest.

The inquest in August 1971 was not able to establish the exact sequence of events. It was established that all three were shot at very close range, probably in a line. All had been drinking, and Joseph was found to be severely intoxicated. The jury was told that the three were probably shot whilst relieving themselves beside the road. The coroner commented: "You may think that this was not only murder, but one of the vilest crimes ever heard of in living memory". The bodies were heaped on top of each other with two beer glasses lying nearby. After failing to return to their barracks by 18:30 the three were listed as AWOL. Their bodies were found by children at 21:30.

== Aftermath ==
The day after the killings, British Home Secretary Reginald Maudling made a statement in the House of Commons in which he said that security arrangements for off-duty soldiers were being reviewed and suggested that the aim of the IRA was to provoke the British security forces into reprisals. He said:

The battle now joined against the terrorists will be fought with the utmost vigour and determination. It is a battle against a small minority of armed and ruthless men whose strength lies not so much in their numbers as in their wickedness.

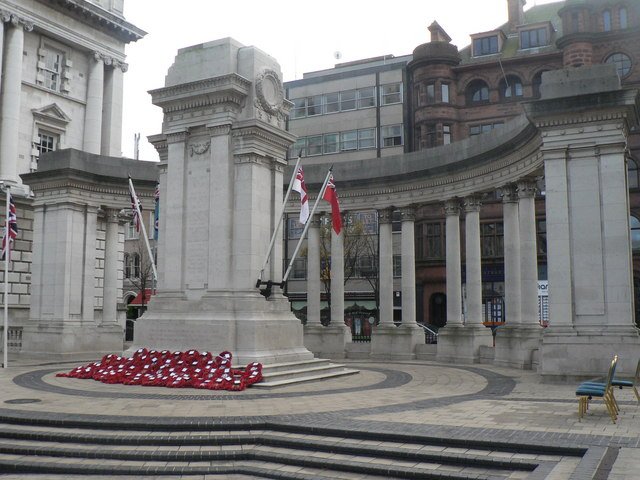
Belfast Cenotaph, focus of the public mourning in Belfast

The funerals were held in Scotland with John and Joseph McCaig buried together in Ayr. Their older brother, serving with the Royal Marines in Singapore, was flown home for the service. That day, 20,000 people attended rallies in Belfast and Carrickfergus. In Belfast, the cenotaph at City Hall was the focus of the mourning, with 10,000 people attending, including workers from factories in a gathering that stopped the traffic in the city centre. Many wept openly. The Reverend Ian Paisley led the mourners in laying dozens of wreaths. The crowd observed a two-minute silence and sang a hymn and the British national anthem.

Days later, in retaliation, a bomb planted by loyalists destroyed Squire's Hill Tavern at Ligoniel near where the bodies of the soldiers had been found. The owner denied rumours that the soldiers had been drinking in the pub prior to their deaths.

The deaths led to a crisis for the Government of Northern Ireland with calls for increased security measures. Paisley demanded the Government's resignation, saying "We can no longer tolerate your weakness. You must go before the whole land is deluged with the blood of innocent men and women." On 12 March, 4,000 loyalist shipyard workers took to the streets of Belfast to demand internment. The Northern Ireland Prime Minister James Chichester-Clark flew to London to request more troops, and when the numbers were less than he wanted, he resigned. On 23 March, Brian Faulkner was elected Ulster Unionist Party leader and was appointed prime minister the same day.

The British Army raised the minimum age for serving in Northern Ireland to 18 in response to outrage over the death of 17-year-old McCaig.

== Perpetrators ==
No one has been convicted of the killings. The Daily Mirror reported in November 2007 that three IRA volunteers were responsible: Martin Meehan (died 2007), who was questioned over the killings but never charged; Patrick McAdorey, who was suspected of killing another soldier in August 1971 hours before he himself was killed in a gun battle; and a third unnamed man. The case is one of those being re-examined by the Police Service of Northern Ireland's Historical Enquiries Team.

In 2020, a BBC Spotlight investigation made allegations that Paddy O'Kane (died 2009) was one of those involved. He had been a member of the Parachute Regiment from 1957 to 1964.

== Memorial ==
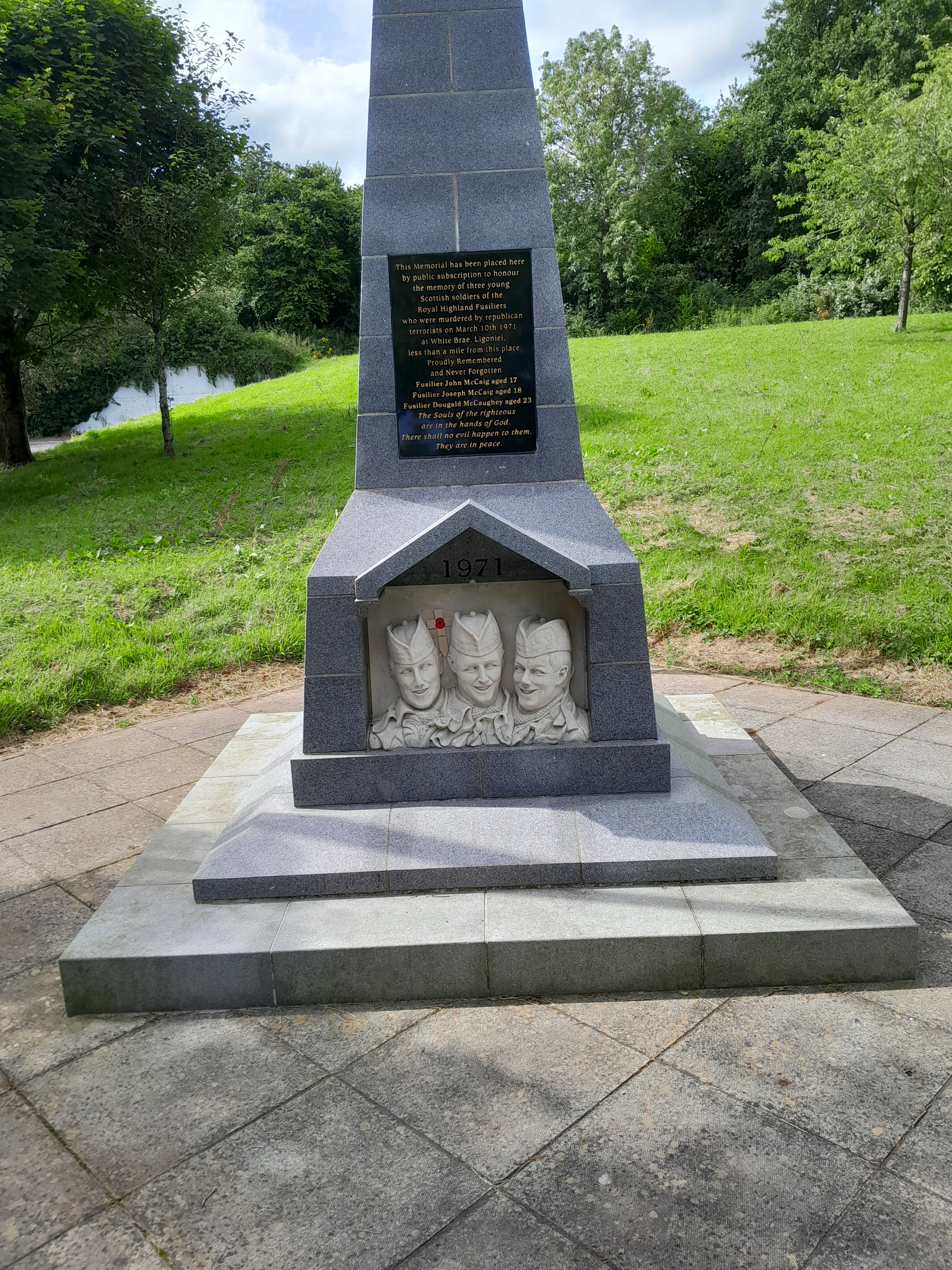
Memorial in Belfast

The mother of the two McCaig brothers visited the site of their deaths in May 1972. She expressed a wish to leave a monument to her sons but was advised that it might well be damaged by vandals. She later said that she was touched by the wreaths and flowers that had been left at the spot.

In 2010, the Royal British Legion Oldpark/Cavehill branch in Belfast raised money from the sale of badges to erect a memorial to the men. On 28 May 2010, a memorial stone was placed at the site of the killings on Squire's Hill by the families and former regimental colleagues of the three soldiers. The next day a 15-foot obelisk incorporating carved images of the deceased was dedicated at nearby Ballysillan Avenue. A service of remembrance with regimental drums and colours was then held at Ballysillan leisure centre, attended by around 1,000 people including Lord Mayor of Belfast Naomi Long and North Belfast MP Nigel Dodds.

The memorial at White Brae, Ligoniel, marking the place of the killings, has been vandalised several times since 2011.

== See also ==
- Chronology of Provisional Irish Republican Army actions (1970-1979)
- Corporals killings
- Provisional IRA Honey Trap killings
