= Murder of Sydney Agnew =

Sydney Agnew (1931 – 18 January 1972) was a Belfast bus conductor who was killed by the IRA in 1972.

== Background ==
Agnew was a forty-year-old bus conductor, a father of three children, and a Protestant native of Belfast. In January 1972 he was one of a number of witnesses to a hijacking and burning of a bus at gunpoint by members of the IRA. A number of those responsible were arrested and to be tried, Agnew being one of those summoned to give testimony.

On the 18 January 1972, the door of his house off the Albertbridge Road was knocked on by two teenagers. Agnew's six-year-old son opened the door, the teenagers brandished guns and opened fire on Agnew, shooting him several times.

Agnew was commemorated in the poem Wounds, written by the poet Michael Longley in May 1972, and published in his second book, An Exploded View, in 1973.
