= Murder of Andrew Burns =

2008 murder in Ireland

Andrew Burns (c. 1980 – 12 February 2008) was a member of the Real IRA who was killed by Óglaigh na hÉireann, a Continuity IRA splinter group, in East Donegal in February 2008. According to The Guardian, at the time of his death, Burns was believed to have been "the first victim of a Republican terrorist murder in Northern Ireland for six years."

A native of Strabane in the north-west of County Tyrone, Burns was killed in the carpark beside the Chapel at Doneyloop (pronounced 'Dunny-loop'), a hamlet in the east of County Donegal located between Clady and Castlefin, under the pretext that he "was required to go on an IRA operation in which it was intended to murder a PSNI officer who was dating a girl in Donnyloop [sic.]. When they got to Donnyloop, they were met by three men who were known as members of Óglaigh na hÉireann.":

Kelly said that a week before the murder he was approached by 'Mr A' who asked him to take Andrew Burns to Donnyloop for 'a punishment beating or shooting'. He met 'Mr A' the next day and he told him that 'Mr B' and 'Mr C' would be there for the shooting. Kelly told the officers that he knew it was 'an IRA operation' and he said he had done other jobs for the IRA, but had never been sworn in himself. He said that on the day of the murder, he picked up Mr Burns in Strabane and drove him in his car to Donnyloop car park ... When they got there he saw a red van. Mr Burns got out of the car went to the van but came back. Mr Burns got back in the car and he drove out of the car park, waited about five minutes and then drove back into the car park. Mr Burns got out of the car and then Mr A walked past him. Then Mr B approached Mr Burns and went to pull the trigger of his gun but the gun jammed. Mr Burns started to run towards the car park exit, the gunman, Mr B, ran after him and fired a shot which injured him ... Kelly said Mr Burns stumbled but kept running towards the church. Mr B chased him and fired a second shot.

—

Martin Kelly (then aged 37) of Barrack Street, Strabane, a bus driver, was found guilty of Burns's murder in December 2011, and sentenced to life in prison. He had transported Burns from Strabane to nearby Doneyloop, where Burns was shot dead.

In May 2026, a woman in her 60s was arrested in relation to his murder.

== See also ==
- Murder of Matthew Burns
- Murder of James Curran
