= Murder of Matthew Burns =

2002 murder in Northern Ireland

Matthew Burns (c. 1976 – 21 February 2002) was a drug dealer shot dead by the Real IRA.

== Background ==
A native of Castlewellan, County Down, Burns was a fitness disciple, and kick-boxed with Northern Ireland's tae kwon do academy. He was a participant in a campaign to have tae kwon do listed as an Olympic sport, and hoped to compete in the Olympics himself. He was also described as a drug dealer, and had been linked to a plot to import heroin into Northern Ireland, along with an accomplice, Frankie Mulholland, shot dead by loyalists in 2002.

== Dispute with the Real IRA ==
Between late 1999 and early 2000, he became involved with a dispute against local members of the Real Irish Republican Army (RIRA), including its commander. This is believed to have led to an incident where the Real IRA commander led a group of seven men to administer a punishment beating on Burns in John F. Kennedy Park. According to an article in the Irish Independent:

The gang, all wearing balaclavas, confronted Matthew outside his mother's house in JF Kennedy Park on the outskirts of Castlewellan. Despite a glancing blow to his head which opened a large gash, Matthew was able to keep on his feet. And despite being unarmed, he managed to set about the gang in the way that only a champion kick-boxer could. He was enormously strong, and in a prolonged one-against-seven contest he overcame the gang, finally pulling the balaclava off one man – the local IRA "officer commanding" and exposing him to people who had come out of their houses. Unmasking the IRA man almost certainly saved his life at this point as the "commander" could not afford to be seen giving the order to have Matthew shot in front of witnesses. The gang ran off. But that humiliation – a seven-man IRA gang bested by one enormously strong young man – sealed Matthew's eventual fate. In Castlewellan, just as in Belfast Short Strand where Robert McCartney was murdered for standing up to the IRA for his friend, no one is allowed to resist the will of the IRA.

Burns was afterwards the subject of a booby-trap bomb placed on his car at the house of the mother of his girlfriend. While Burns was uninjured, his pregnant girlfriend received a leg injury. She later gave birth to the couple's only child.

== Second IRA attack ==
Burns and his brother Patrick were leaving their mother's home in Rathfriland on 21 February 2002 in Castlewellan, County Down. when "a gunman opened fire with a high-powered assault shotgun, an Italian-manufactured weapon that fires steel ball bearings with destructive power. The first blast disabled the car engine. The second, fired at point-blank range, tore through Matthew's chest and neck. Two of the steel pellets hit Patrick in the hand and arm."

The Police Service of Northern Ireland reportedly believe Burns was shot by a member of the Real IRA "nearby Kilcoo, brought in by the local Provisional IRA boss to carry out the assassination." Several other people are believed to have been involved.

== Aftermath ==
Patrick Burns died on 9 December 2003. Another brother, Sean, received a death threat from the IRA, forcing him into exile. After his death, "stories that he was a drug dealer with links to loyalists" were reportedly disseminated. were claimed to be deliberate vilification by republicans seeking to justify the murder, and refuted by the PSNI at an inquest in November 2004.

Burns' grave was regularly desecrated and his remains were re-interred elsewhere.

== Andrew Burns ==
Matthew Burns was unrelated to Andrew Burns, killed by the IRA in the east of County Donegal in 2008.

== See also ==
- Murder of Robert McCartney
- Murder of Gareth O'Connor
- Murder of Joseph Rafferty
