= William J. Staunton =

British resident magistrate killed by the IRA

- Born: 1928
- Died: 25 January 1973 (age 46); Royal Victoria Hospital, Belfast, Northern Ireland
- Cause of death: Shot by members of the Provisional Irish Republican Army
- Occupation: Resident magistrate

William J. Staunton (1928 – 25 January 1973) was a British resident magistrate killed by the Provisional IRA.

Staunton was a Roman Catholic member of the judiciary. Shortly before 9 AM on the morning of 11 October 1972, he was driving his daughters and her school friends to St. Dominic's Convent Grammar School, on the Falls Road, Belfast. He stopped the car outside St. Dominic's and the girls got out. As they did so, two members of the IRA upon a motorcycle came alongside the car, the pillion passenger shooting Staunton.

He underwent emergency surgery at the Royal Victoria Hospital, and he never regained consciousness until his death on 25 January 1973. He died aged 46.

Staunton was the first of a number of judges killed or attacked by the IRA during the 1970s and 1980s. Others included Rory Conaghan and Martin McBirney in 1974, William Doyle in 1983, and Lord Justice Sir Maurice Gibson in 1987. The IRA were also responsible for the deaths of Lord Justice Gibson's wife Cecily, and Mary Travers (a daughter of Judge Tom Travers), shot alongside her father after leaving a Catholic church.
