= Irish Republican Socialist Movement =

Umbrella term for some Irish groups

The Irish Republican Socialist Movement (IRSM) is an umbrella term for:

- the Irish Republican Socialist Party (IRSP), a Marxist–Leninist Irish republican political party formed in 1974 following a split in Official Sinn Féin.
  - the Irish National Liberation Army (INLA), the paramilitary wing of the IRSP.
  - the Republican Socialist Youth Movement (RSYM), the youth wing of the IRSP.
- the Irish Republican Socialist Committees of North America, the representation of the IRSM in North America.
