= Henry McDonald (writer) =

Northern Irish journalist and author (1965–2023)

- Born: Henry Patrick McDonald; 6 July 1965; Belfast, Northern Ireland
- Died: 19 February 2023 (aged 57); Belfast, Northern Ireland
- Education: Queen's University Belfast
- Occupations: Journalist; author; editor
- Spouse: Claire Breen (m. 1996, divorced)
- Partners: June Caldwell; Charlotte Blease
- Children: 3
- Relatives: Jack Holland (cousin)
- Writing career
- Years active: 1989–2023
- Subject: The Troubles

Henry Patrick McDonald (6 July 1965 – 19 February 2023) was a Northern Irish journalist and author. He was a correspondent for The Guardian and Observer, and from 2021 was the political editor of The News Letter, one of Northern Ireland's national daily newspapers, based in Belfast.

== Early life ==
Henry Patrick McDonald was born in a Catholic enclave of central Belfast in 1965, and was a student at St Malachy's College. He briefly attended Edinburgh University before gaining a degree from Queen's University Belfast.

In his youth, McDonald involved in the Workers' Party, a left-wing party that emerged from Sinn Féin in the early 1970s and was associated with the Official IRA. He travelled to the German Democratic Republic (East Germany) with the youth wing of SFWP in the early 1980s.

== Career ==
After taking a journalism course at Dublin City University, McDonald began his professional writing career in 1989 at the Belfast newspaper The Irish News. He wrote extensively about the Troubles and related issues, with a particular focus on paramilitary groups in Northern Ireland, like the Ulster Defence Association (UDA) and Irish National Liberation Army (INLA). He wrote a book on the INLA, INLA – Deadly Divisions, which he co-authored with his cousin, Jack Holland. The book was first published in 1994.

McDonald also wrote on Ulster loyalist paramilitary groups and co-authored books on the Ulster Volunteer Force (UVF) and UDA with Jim Cusack. He also wrote a biography of Ulster Unionist Party (UUP) leader David Trimble, a personal biography Colours: Ireland – From Bombs to Boom, and, in 2017, Martin McGuinness: A Life Remembered. He was, for a period, a security correspondent for the BBC in Belfast.

In 1997, McDonald became the Ireland correspondent for The Observer, and assumed the role for The Guardian in 2007. He was based out of the paper's London office from 2018 to 2020. He then returned to Belfast, where he wrote for The Sunday Times, and worked as the political editor of The News Letter, headquartered in Belfast.

=== Novels ===
McDonald's first novel, The Swinging Detective, was published in 2017, and his second, Two Souls, was published by Merrion Press in 2019. A third novel, called Thy Will Be Done, was forthcoming at the time of his death.

== Personal life and death ==
McDonald was a supporter of Irish League football club Cliftonville and English Premier League club Everton. He married Claire Breen in 1996, and they had three children before divorcing. He also spent 12 years in a relationship with author June Caldwell, living some of that time in Dublin where he taught journalism and feature writing at the Dublin Business School and the Irish Writers Centre. At the time of his death, he was in a relationship with Charlotte Blease.

In 2018, McDonald was diagnosed with cancer and an unspecified heart condition. He died at a hospital in Belfast on 19 February 2023, at the age of 57.

== Works ==
=== Non-fiction ===
- McDonald, Henry; Holland, Jack (1994). INLA – Deadly divisions. Dublin: Torc. ISBN 189814205X.
- McDonald, Henry (2017). Martin McGuinness: A Life Remembered. Belfast: Blackstaff Press. ISBN 9781780731681.
- Cusack, Jim; McDonald, Henry (2008). UVF: The Endgame. Dublin: Poolbeg Press. ISBN 9781842233269.
- McDonald, Henry (1 September 2005). Colours: Ireland – From Bombs to Boom. Mainstream Publishing. ISBN 1845960254.

=== Fiction ===
- McDonald, Henry (2 November 2017). The Swinging Detective. London: Gibson Square Books. ISBN 9781783341160.
- McDonald, Henry (20 August 2019). Two Souls: A Novel. Newbridge, County Kildare: Merrion Press. ISBN 9781785372575.
