= Seamus Costello =

Irish republican (1939-1977)

- Costello during a 1975 interview with RTÉ

Wicklow County Councillor
- In office March 1967 – October 1977
- Constituency: Bray

Bray Urban District Councillor
- In office 1977–1967

Personal details
- Born: 1939 Old Connaught Avenue, Bray, County Wicklow, Ireland
- Died: 5 October 1977 (aged 37 or 38) North Strand, Dublin, Ireland
- Cause of death: Assassination by gunshot
- Party: Irish Republican Socialist Party
- Other political affiliations: Sinn Féin (1955–1970); Official Sinn Féin (1970–1974)
- Spouse: Maeliosa Costello
- Children: 4
- Nickname: The Boy General

Military service
- Branch/service: Irish National Liberation Army (1974–1977); Official IRA (1969–1974); Irish Republican Army (1955–1969)
- Rank: Chief of Staff (INLA); Director of Operations (Official IRA); Adjutant-General (IRA)
- Battles/wars: Border Campaign; The Troubles

Seamus Costello (1939 – 5 October 1977) was an Irish republican socialist, paramilitary leader, and elected politician. Born in Bray, County Wicklow, he rose to prominence in the republican movement during the Irish Republican Army's Border Campaign of the late 1950s and subsequently became one of the most significant, if divisive, figures in Irish republican politics. He is best remembered as the founder of the Irish Republican Socialist Party (IRSP) and its paramilitary wing, the Irish National Liberation Army (INLA). He remains the only leader of an Irish political party to have been assassinated.

== Early life ==
Costello was born at Old Connaught Avenue, Bray, County Wicklow, the son of John Costello, a farmer and cattle-dealer, and his wife Elizabeth. He was educated at the Christian Brothers' College, Monkstown Park. He left school at the age of 15 and worked initially as a mechanic before becoming a car salesman in Dublin.

== Border Campaign and early republicanism ==
At 16, Costello joined both Sinn Féin and the Irish Republican Army (IRA). Within a year, he was commanding an active service unit in south County Londonderry during the IRA's Border Campaign (1956–1962). His leadership ability and his burning of the courthouse in Magherafelt earned him the nickname "the Boy General". The unit's most publicised actions included the destruction of bridges.

In 1957, he was arrested in Glencree, County Wicklow, and sentenced to six months in Mountjoy Prison. On his release, he was immediately interned at the Curragh camp for two further years. He used his time in custody studying, drawing particular inspiration from the Vietnamese struggle for independence. He became a member of the escape committee, which engineered the successful escapes of Ruairí Ó Brádaigh and Dáithí Ó Conaill, among others, and later described this period as his "university days".

Costello eventually rose to the rank of Adjutant-General of the IRA. In 1964, he was sent to the recently opened Chinese embassy in Paris to seek assistance from the Chinese government for the republican movement.

== Political activism ==
After his release from internment, Costello rebuilt his political base in County Wicklow, working as Sinn Féin's local organiser. He helped found a tenants' association in Bray, and became involved in the credit union movement and various farmers' organisations. He married Maeliosa Gaynor from Rapla, near Nenagh, County Tipperary, who also became active in the republican movement. In 1966, he was elected to both Bray Urban District Council and Wicklow County Council. Costello strongly supported the left-wing orientation of the republican movement during these years, emphasising grassroots political activism. In a Dáil by-election in March 1968, he secured over 2,000 first-preference votes, establishing a reputation as an energetic local representative involved in housing action committees and tenants' rights associations.

== Official Sinn Féin and Official IRA ==
When the Troubles broke out in Northern Ireland in 1969, the republican movement split into Official and Provisional factions. Costello remained with the Officials, owing to his greater commitment to left-wing politics, and served as vice-president of Official Sinn Féin and as Director of Operations of the Official IRA. He vehemently opposed the Official IRA ceasefire of 29 May 1972, and began clashing openly with the leadership, particularly with Eoin Ó Murchú. The ideological dispute underlying Costello's break with the Officials was, at its core, a disagreement over the Marxist theory of historical stages. The Official leadership had adopted the position that Ireland would need to pass through a phase of bourgeois democracy before any socialist transformation was possible, a reading that translated, in Northern Irish terms, into demands for the reform of the Stormont state rather than its abolition. Costello rejected this framework entirely, arguing that the national question and the class struggle were inseparable and must be pursued in tandem.

Costello was subjected to a court-martial in 1974. Brigid Makowski, called to testify at the proceedings in Mornington, County Meath, remarked that "Jesus could have testified on Costello's behalf and it wouldn't have changed the verdict." He was dismissed from Official Sinn Féin in 1974 after the leadership blocked his supporters from attending the party convention; his expulsion was confirmed at the ard fheis in December of that year. Despite his expulsion, Costello topped the poll in the 1974 local elections for both Wicklow County Council and Bray Urban District Council.

== Founding of the IRSP and INLA ==
On 8 December 1974, at a meeting in the Lucan Spa Hotel near Dublin, Costello presided over the founding of the Irish Republican Socialist Party (IRSP), drawing together republicans, socialists, and trade unionists. The party's declared aim was to "end imperialist rule in Ireland and establish a thirty-two county Democratic Socialist Republic, with the working class in control of the means of production, distribution and exchange" (IRSP, April 1975). At a private meeting later that same day, the Irish National Liberation Army (INLA) was established, with Costello as Chief of Staff, though its existence was initially kept secret. The new movement attracted the prominent former MP Bernadette McAliskey (Bernadette Devlin) as an early member. The IRSP initially denied having a paramilitary wing; the INLA's existence was not publicly acknowledged until January 1976. Costello believed that ending partition was an essential precursor to creating a socialist republic, and that British interests in Ireland needed to be challenged militarily, a position that distinguished him from his former colleagues in Official Sinn Féin. He also advocated contesting elections in the Republic and taking seats if elected, a position Sinn Féin itself would not adopt until 1986.

== Feud with the Official IRA ==
Within days of its founding, the IRSP was embroiled in a bitter feud with the Official IRA, triggered in part by INLA members taking arms from Official IRA supplies. The feud cost three IRSP members their lives. Official IRA leader Sean Garland was wounded six times in an INLA attack near his home in Ballymun, Dublin, though he survived. The feud exposed significant leadership difficulties from the outset. As one account has noted, "the Dublin-based leadership was not in control of the actions of its members a hundred miles to the North". The killing of Official IRA Belfast commander Billy McMillen (shot by Gerard Steenson, then a teenager) was carried out without Costello's sanction, prompting the Official IRA to pass a death sentence against Costello, whom they held ultimately responsible. Costello himself narrowly escaped injury in an assassination attempt outside Waterford city in May 1975 before an uneasy truce was arranged.

In December 1975, McAliskey resigned from the IRSP, having sought to bring the INLA under the political control of the party. Her departure took over half of the Ard Chomhairle members with her. Costello, however, was reluctant to constrain the armed wing, having seen the Official IRA's military capacity smothered by political leadership ceding ground to the Provisionals.

In early 1976, the IRSP suffered further damage following the arrest of members in connection with the Sallins train robbery. The allegations of Garda brutality (subsequently substantiated by Amnesty International) and the eventual convictions of Nicky Kelly and others further undermined both organisations. (The Provisional IRA later claimed responsibility for the robbery, and Kelly ultimately received a presidential pardon). By the autumn of 1976, IRSP membership had fallen to approximately 40, notwithstanding Costello's claim of 800 members at a Troops Out conference.

In July 1976, Costello was replaced as INLA Chief of Staff by south Londonderry man Eddy McNicholl. However, he retained his position as IRSP chairperson and continued to wield considerable influence within the movement.

A central plank of Costello's strategy was what he termed a "broad front" approach, whereby the IRSP/INLA would engage in mass activity with a wide range of organisations and individuals around a limited set of shared objectives. Costello accepted that a British withdrawal could not be achieved through military means alone, and that only a combination of armed struggle and mass popular agitation across all 32 counties would force Britain to the negotiating table. This strategy came to a head in early 1977, when Costello organised a broad front conference at the West County Hotel, near Dublin. The conference was attended by the Provisional IRA, the Communist Party of Ireland, People's Democracy, the Irish Sovereignty Movement, Conradh na Gaeilge, and several other prominent republicans, alongside the IRSP. Its objective was to unite these disparate strands behind a single demand for British withdrawal. The initiative collapsed, however, over irreconcilable preconditions. The Provisionals insisted that any broad front must include explicit support for the armed struggle in the North; the Communist Party demanded the opposite, fearing the alienation of Protestant members if it appeared to endorse the Provisionals. Costello argued that neither demand should be made as a condition of participation, but neither side would yield, and the conference dissolved without agreement.

== Assassination ==
On 5 October 1977, Costello was shot dead as he sat in his car on Northbrook Avenue, off the North Strand Road in Dublin. According to press reports, the gunman spoke to Costello before firing two shotgun blasts at close range, then reloaded and fired again; the gunman escaped in a waiting car. He was 38 years old and the father of four children. The Official and Provisional IRAs both denied responsibility, and Sinn Féin/The Workers' Party issued a statement condemning the killing. The INLA eventually determined that Jim Flynn, a leading member of the Official IRA, had carried out the assassination. Flynn was shot dead by the INLA on 4 June 1982, in the North Strand, Dublin, very close to the spot where Costello had been killed. No one was ever arrested or charged in connection with Costello's killing. In 2007, Wicklow County Councillor Tommy Cullen brought a notice of motion calling on the Minister for Justice to reopen the investigation, citing a 2005 article by journalist Vincent Browne. The motion did not carry, though Cullen called on Browne to bring his information to the Gardaí. At the time of his death, Costello held seats on Wicklow County Council and Bray Urban District Council, as well as memberships across a range of agricultural, trade union, cultural, and regional development bodies. He was president of Bray and District Trade Unions Council in 1976–77.

== Funeral and Legacy ==
Costello's funeral was attended by Ruairí Ó Brádaigh, president of Provisional Sinn Féin; Michael O'Riordan of the Communist Party of Ireland; Bernadette McAliskey; and local Wicklow TDs Liam Kavanagh (Labour), Ciarán Murphy (Fianna Fáil), and Godfrey Timmins (Fine Gael). Thousands attended the ceremonies in Bray. The oration was delivered by Nora Connolly O'Brien, former Senator and daughter of Easter Rising leader James Connolly, who said of Costello: "Of all the politicians and political people with whom I have had conversations and who called themselves followers of Connolly, he was the only one who truly understood what James Connolly meant when he spoke of his vision of the freedom of the Irish people."

Costello's death, according to one academic analysis, "stunted the IRSP's political growth whilst the INLA's proclivity for militarism went relatively unhindered". The loss of its founding leader deprived the IRSP of its only charismatic figurehead, and the INLA subsequently fragmented through internal feuds, eventually disbanding its armed campaign in October 2009, when a spokesperson at Costello's annual commemoration in Bray announced the organisation would pursue its objectives through peaceful and political means.

Costello remains the only leader of an Irish political party to have been killed in the history of the state.

== Sources ==
- Holland, Jack; McDonald, Henry (1994). INLA: Deadly Divisions. Dublin: Torc. ISBN 978-1-898142-05-8.
- Hanley, Brian; Millar, Scott (2009). The Lost Revolution: The Story of the Official IRA and the Workers Party. Dublin: Penguin Ireland. ISBN 978-1-84488-120-8.
- "Irish Republican Socialist Party" Irsm.org Seamus Costello Tribute Page 6 October 2003, retrieved 5 January 2010.
- Political Biography and Tributes 13 August 2003, retrieved 5 January 2010.
- Profile at Electionsireland.com ElectionsIreland.org: Seamus Costello
