= Jack Holland (writer) =

Irish writer and journalist (1947–2004)

- Born: 4 June 1947; Belfast, Northern Ireland
- Died: 14 May 2004 (aged 56)
- Education: Magee College; Trinity College, Dublin; Essex University
- Occupations: Writer; Journalist; Novelist; Poet

Jack Holland (4 June 1947 – 14 May 2004) was a journalist, novelist, and poet who built a reputation chronicling "The Troubles" in his native Northern Ireland. He published articles, short stories, four novels, and seven works of non-fiction, mostly dealing with the politics and cultural life of Northern Ireland. His last book, Misogyny: The World's Oldest Prejudice, was something of a departure from his usual writings, and its original publisher abandoned the finished manuscript shortly after Holland's death, which followed a brief struggle with cancer. However, the book was later published posthumously by a different publisher.

== Early life ==
Born in post-war Belfast to a working-class family, Jack Holland spent his first five years living with his extended family in a home above Dougall's Yard on May Street, where his paternal grandfather, William Henry Holland, a veteran who was wounded in the Battle of the Somme, was the stable keeper. Since his paternal grandmother, Mary Murphy Holland, was a Catholic and his grandfather a Protestant, he was raised in a "mixed" Catholic/Protestant household.

He attended St. Thomas' Secondary Intermediate School, where the headmaster was the writer Michael McLaverty and his English teacher Seamus Heaney. The first in his family to graduate from university, Holland studied at the University of Ulster's Magee College and Trinity College, Dublin. He then earned a master's degree in theoretical linguistics at Essex University in England.

== Career ==
His journalistic career began at the Dublin weekly magazine Hibernia (which he, ironically, had a hand in bringing down), a newspaper owned by John Mulcahy and edited by Brian Trench. Holland worked briefly in 1976 for the BBC Northern Ireland, where he was a researcher for the weekly news programme Spotlight, working alongside Jeremy Paxman and other journalists.

In 1977, Holland moved to New York City with his American wife—Mary Hudson, a teacher and translator—and their daughter, Jenny Holland. He earned his living there as a freelance journalist, writing for many publications, most notably The Irish Echo, where his weekly column "A View North" had a devoted following. In the 1990s, he became a lecturer at the New York University School of Journalism, worked for Channel 4 in London, and co-scripted the documentary Daughters of the Troubles (produced by Marcia Rock). His knowledge of the Northern Irish political situation and his reporting of the terrorist conflict earned him the respect of the public and of influential policy-makers in Washington, London, and Dublin such as statesmen Ted Kennedy, Hillary Clinton. the President and Prime Minister of Ireland, and the Minister of State for Northern Ireland.

Throughout Holland's travels with his wife, he wrote four novels, non-fiction work, and two volumes of poetry. He also had several short stories published in the magazines Story, Glimmertrain, and Crosscurrents. Over the course of his career, his writings appeared in The New York Times, The Village Voice, The San Francisco Chronicle, The Boston Globe, The Washington Post, and Newsday in the US; as well as in the British and Irish publications The Spectator, The Sunday Independent, The Irish News in Belfast, and The Irish Post in London.

He has written a book on the Irish National Liberation Army, INLA – Deadly Divisions, which he co-authored with his cousin, the former Workers' Party and Official IRA associate Henry McDonald. The book was first published in 1994 and has since been reprinted.

== Personal life ==
In 1974, Holland married Mary Hudson, an American language teacher and translator. In 1975, their daughter Jenny Holland was born in Dublin. In the 1980s, they lived in Brooklyn, New York, before moving to Trevignano Romano, outside Rome in Italy. In the early 1990s, they returned to Belfast for several years before finally settling back in Brooklyn, where they remained until Holland died in 2004.

In 1997, his wife Mary completed a PhD in French. In 2004, her translation of Louis-Ferdinand Céline's Fable for Another Time was awarded the Modern Language Association's first prize for the translation of a literary work.

Holland spent the last years of his life exploring New York with his wife and working on his final manuscript. He died of cancer at the age of 56.

== Books ==
- Too Long a Sacrifice, Dodd Mead & Company, 1981
- The Prisoner's Wife, Dodd Mead & Company, 1981, Robert Hale, London, 1982, Poolbeg Press, Dublin 1995
- Druid Time, Dodd Mead & Company, 1986
- The American Connection, Viking Penguin, New York, 1987, Roberts Rinehart Publishers, 1987
- The Fire Queen, The Penguin Group, New York, 1992
- Walking Corpses, Torc, (division of Poolbeg Press,) Dublin, 1994
- INLA: Deadly Divisions, (with Henry McDonald) Poolbeg Press, Dublin, 1994
- Phoenix: Policing the Shadows, (with Susan Phoenix) Hodder & Stoughton, 1996 (ISBN 978-0-3406-6634-0) & 2004, about the Chinook helicopter crash in June 1994 in Scotland, which killed the top anti-terrorist brass of the British Army and Northern Ireland police force
- Hope Against History, Henry Holt & Company, New York, 1999
- Misogyny, the World's Oldest Prejudice, Constable & Robinson (UK) / Carroll & Graf (US), 2006
