= Jimmy Brown (Irish republican) =

Irish republican and drug dealer

- Born: James Brown; 1956; Broadway Road, Belfast, Northern Ireland
- Died: 18 August 1992 (aged 36); Clonard Street, Falls Road, Belfast, Northern Ireland
- Organisations: Official IRA (1969–1976); INLA (1976–1986); IPLO (1986–1992)

Jimmy Brown (1956 – 18 August 1992) was a militant Irish republican and drug dealer who was a member of Fianna Eireann, the Official IRA, then Irish Republican Socialist Party (IRSP)/ Irish National Liberation Army (INLA), and latterly of the Irish People's Liberation Organisation (IPLO).

== Biography ==
Brown was born on Broadway Road near the Falls Road in west Belfast. As a teenager, he was a member of Fianna Eireann and in 1969, upon the onset of the Troubles, he joined the Official IRA where he was a member of their "intelligence department". Within the OIRA, Brown was a member of the Seamus Costello faction which split off as their own organisation in 1974. Their faction became the Irish National Liberation Army, with the Irish Republican Socialist Party as their political wing. Brown did not immediately follow Costello into the INLA, instead remaining within the OIRA until early 1976 as a spy. After that, Brown openly joined the INLA and in December 1977 Brown was made a member of IRSP's ard comhairle (executive committee). Thereafter Browne acted as both a political spokesman and an "intelligence officer" who planned bombings and shootings. Those who admired Brown gave him the moniker "the Professor" because of his skill with Marxist rhetoric while his detractors mocked him by calling him "the Clown", due to his involvement in several high-profile blunders.

=== Extended police custody ===
Brown was closely associated with childhood friend and neighbour Gerard Steenson, and in December 1981 Brown supported Steenson's attempt to seize control of the INLA. By February 1983 Brown was chairman of the IRSP's Belfast branch; that same month he contested a Belfast City Council by-election. However, during his campaign, he was arrested alongside Steenson and other leading Belfast INLA members after INLA member Rab McAllister became an informant to the police. In March 1983 McAllister retracted his testimony, but Brown and the rest of the detained INLA members were still held because of the evidence of another informer, Jackie Grimley. In December 1983 the INLA members were put before the court, but Lord Justice Maurice Gibson deemed Grimley, a petty criminal, unreliable. Nevertheless, Brown and the INLA members continued to be held when a third informer, Harry Kirkpatrick, gave evidence against them. During this time period, Brown used his time in court during bail applicants to make political speeches. He also created political articles and letters. In December 1985 Brown and the INLA members were convicted of terrorism on Kirkpatrick's evidence, but one year later in December 1986, their sentences were overturned on appeal.

=== Republican infighting ===
In 1982 "Mad Dog" Dominic McGlinchey had become the leader of the INLA, however, in 1984, McGlinchy was captured while Brown was still in jail. Without McGlinchy, a power vacuum was created within the INLA. One faction fell behind Belfast's John O'Reilly, while others formed together as an anti-O'Reilly block. Brown was part of the anti-O'Reilly group, and as a result O'Reilly tried to personally kill Brown's brother in October 1984, while in the summer of 1985, Brown was attacked by O'Reilly followers while in prison.

Upon the release of the Brown/Steenson group, they sought retaliation against the O'Reilly group, a feud that would see 11 people killed. As O'Reilly retained the INLA label, the Brown/Steenson faction renamed themselves the 'Irish People's Liberation Organisation', with Brown forming a political wing called the 'Republican Socialist Collective'. The IPLO's initial aim was to destroy the IRSM and replace it with their organisation.

Steenson was shot dead on 14 March 1987, leaving Brown the principal political leader of the IPLO/RSC. Brown by this point had moved to Dublin, where his affable personality won over many in the media and far-left circle, leading them to assume Brown was in control of both the IPLO and RSC. However, behind the scenes, Brown was increasingly losing control of the IPLO to the gunmen who filled its ranks. In the late 1980s, the IPLO carried out a series of high-profile assassinations of Loyalist leaders but also a number of mindless attacks on Loyalist pubs in which people were targeted at random. Brown handwaved any criticism of the attacks using his Marxist rhetoric.

By 1989 the IPLO had turned to drug dealing in order to fund the purchase of more weapons. Brown oversaw these operations, using old INLA arms smuggling routes in Western Europe for drug trafficking, particularly MDMA and ecstasy, from locations such as the Netherlands and France to Ireland via the Europort in Rosslare. When this was put to Brown, he would occasionally justify the IPLO's actions by noting the drug dealing activities of other Marxist paramilitary groups internationally such as FARC. It was also around this time that the IPLO began an "open door" policy to increase membership, allowing criminals and those rejected by other paramilitary groups into their ranks without barriers. Some hardened criminals joined the IPLO to seek protection from the Provisional IRA crackdowns on their illicit activities. This upset many other republican groups and the IPLO's notoriety soared. By late 1991, the Provisional IRA began to make clear it was not happy with the IPLO and started to threaten action. Brown retorted back by threatening to stand in Gerry Adams' West Belfast constituency as a spoiler candidate, so that the SDLP could take the seat. Brown also declared that if he was attacked, he would have the IPLO assassinate leading members of Sinn Féin. Paradoxically, Brown also suggested, as an alternative, that all Irish Republican groups should band together as a "broad front".

By 1991 it's alleged that IPLO drug dealing had stripped the IPLO/RSC of any remaining political credibility they had and left them solely a criminal gang. In August 1991 it was alleged that the IPLO collaborated with the UVF to kill senior IPLO operator Martin O'Prey in a dispute over profits. After the killing of O'Prey, Brown and the IPLO chief-of-staff threatened to kill "selective loyalist targets", however members instead opted for shooting up loyalist bars and businesses, such as the Diamond Jubilee Bar on the Shankill Road and the Donegall Arms on Roden Street. Following the robbery of a post office in Whiterock, the IPLO split into two groups, the "Army Council" and the "Belfast Brigade". Each side accused the other of drug dealing, collaborating with Loyalists and of working with the British as informants.

Brown was killed while sitting in his car on Clonard Street in the Lower Falls area of West Belfast by the IPLO's Belfast Brigade faction on 18 August 1992. Disgusted by the entire matter, the Provisional IRA moved in and attacked both groups in a large-scale operation on Halloween, dubbed the "Night of Long Knives" by Belfast locals. During the operation, one IPLO member was executed and another 20 were shot. Weak, leaderless and demoralised, both factions of the IPLO "surrendered" to the PIRA and disbanded.

== Legacy ==
Historian Patrick Maume described Brown's life as a waste of talent, stating "Some sympathy can be felt for [Brown] as a self-educated working-class boy, shaped by the sectarian violence of the early troubles and seeking in Marxism a tool to make sense of the world. A devious man who deceived himself, he provided an ideological veneer for sectarian murder and criminality, and expanded paramilitary involvement in drug dealing."

== Personal life ==
Brown's son, Emmet McDonough Brown, was elected as an Alliance Party of Northern Ireland member of Belfast City Council at the 2014 Northern Ireland local elections.

== Sources ==
- Jack Holland & Henry McDonald, INLA - Deadly Divisions, Publisher: Torc (1994); ISBN 189814205X/ISBN 978-1898142058
