= Irish Republican Socialist Party =

Irish communist political party

Irish Republican Socialist Party Páirtí Poblachtach Sóisalach na h-Éireann
- Abbreviation: IRSP
- Leader: Ard Chomhairle (National Executive)
- Chairman: Martin McMonagle
- Founder: Seamus Costello and others
- Founded: 8 December 1974; 51 years ago
- Split from: Official Sinn Féin
- Headquarters: Costello House, 392b Falls Road, Belfast, BT12 6DH, County Antrim, Northern Ireland
- Newspaper: The Starry Plough; Worker's Republic (Belfast)
- Youth wing: Republican Socialist Youth Movement (RSYM)
- Paramilitary wing: Irish National Liberation Army (INLA, 1974–present)
- American affiliate: Irish Republican Socialist Committees of North America
- Ideology: Communism; Marxism–Leninism; Irish republicanism Hard Euroscepticism
- Political position: Far-left
- Colours: Red; Yellow; White

Website
- irsp.ie

The Irish Republican Socialist Party or IRSP (Irish: Páirtí Poblachtach Sóisialach na hÉireann) is a Marxist-Leninist and Irish republican communist party in Ireland. It is associated with the Irish National Liberation Army (INLA) paramilitary group. The party's youth wing is the Republican Socialist Youth Movement (RSYM). It was founded by former members of 'Official' Sinn Féin in 1974 during the Troubles. The IRSP initially described itself as a socialist Irish republican party; however, in 1984, it adopted Marxism–Leninism. The party opposes the Good Friday Agreement and the European Union. It has no elected representatives.

== History ==
=== 1970s ===
The Starry Plough is often used as a symbol to represent the Irish Republican Socialist Party, its armed wing the Irish National Liberation Army, and other Irish republican socialist groups

The Irish Republican Socialist Party was founded at a meeting on 8 December 1974 in the Spa Hotel in Lucan, near Dublin, by former members of Official Sinn Féin, headed by Seamus Costello. He had been expelled from the Official Irish Republican Army (OIRA) following a court-martial, and from Official Sinn Féin on the same basis. Along with other activists, he was dissatisfied with the group's tactics and policies, especially on the issues surrounding the 1972 OIRA ceasefire and his growing belief that the emerging conflict was sectarian. According to the IRSP, 80 people were in attendance. A paramilitary wing, the Irish National Liberation Army (INLA), was founded the same day, although its existence was intended to be kept hidden until such a time that the INLA could operate effectively. Costello was elected as the party's first chairperson and the Army's first chief of staff. Together, the IRSP and the INLA were referred to as the Irish Republican Socialist Movement (IRSM).

Former Unity MP for Mid-Ulster Bernadette McAliskey served on the executive of the IRSP. In December 1975 she resigned following the failure of a motion to be passed which would have brought the INLA under the control of the IRSP Ard Comhairle (executive committee). This led to the resignation of half the Ard Comhairle, which weakened the party. Tony Gregory, a future Dublin TD, was also a member for a short time.

In one of the first of the INLA's armed operations, Billy McMillen, commanding officer of the OIRA Belfast Battalion, was murdered by INLA member Gerard Steenson.

On 5 October 1977, Costello was shot dead in his car by a man armed with a shotgun. His supporters blamed the Official IRA for the killing.

The party's poor showing in the 1977 Irish general election, resignations, and the assassination of Costello, weakened the organisation.

=== 1980s ===
In 1980, several IRSP and INLA members—including John Turnley, Miriam Daly, Ronnie Bunting and Noel Little—were killed by Ulster loyalist paramilitaries, most prominently the Ulster Defence Association (UDA). The IRSP have contended that the killings were a result of collusion between loyalists and security forces, even suspecting that some of the killings were carried out by the SAS with responsibility attributed to the UDA.

Three members of the INLA and IRSP died in the 1981 Irish hunger strike in HM Prison Maze, also known as Long Kesh: Patsy O'Hara, Kevin Lynch, and Michael Devine.

During its first ten years, the IRSP described itself as "socialist", but in 1984 the IRSP formally adopted the communist ideology of Marxism-Leninism. It rejected "parliamentary means", "left-republicanism" and "Hibernianised socialism". By this time, most of the IRSP activists who played a prominent role in the hunger strikes were no longer associated with the party. "Costello traditionalists had been jailed, displaced, or simply left". This adoption of Marxism-Leninism caused misgivings in the INLA. In December 1984, an INLA GHQ representative acknowledged that "many within our ranks who have a more traditional republican viewpoint" were uneasy with the decision.

In 1987, the IRSP and INLA came under attack from the Irish People's Liberation Organisation (IPLO), an organisation founded by Gerard Steenson, Jimmy Brown and Martin 'Rook' O'Prey, consisting of people who had resigned or been expelled from the INLA. A political wing, the Republican Socialist Collective (RSC), was also formed by Brown. The IPLO's initial aim was to destroy the IRSM and replace it with their organisation. Five members of the INLA and IRSP were killed by the IPLO, including leaders Ta Power and John O'Reilly. The INLA retaliated with several killings of their own. After the INLA killed the IPLO's leader, Steenson, a truce was reached. Although severely damaged by the IPLO's attacks, the INLA continued to exist. The IPLO, which was heavily involved in drug dealing, was forcibly disbanded by the Provisional IRA in a large scale operation in 1992.

=== Recent history ===
In the 2000s and 2010s, the IRSP has been involved in campaigns and political protests, mainly around Belfast and Derry but also in of parts of the Republic of Ireland as well. Some of these protests included anti-austerity protests, the Right2Water campaign against water charges, opposition to welfare reform and introduction of universal credit, and supporting striking nurses.

In November 2016, after a number of raids on members of the party's homes, the IRSP issued a warning saying the PSNI were "playing with fire". IRSP's Lower Falls representative Michael Kelly claimed that "British security forces risk bringing serious conflict onto the streets" and said that "The Irish Republican Socialist Party has been in existence for over 40 years, in that time we have never tolerated attacks on our membership from any quarter," The comments drew criticism from UUP MLA Doug Beattie and SDLP Alex Attwood.

During the COVID-19 pandemic, the IRSP launched Republican Socialist Aid, which aimed to distribute PPE to healthcare and essential workers in communities across Ireland at risk of exposure to the virus.

In September 2020 the IRSP started a 'Drop The Rents' campaign, requesting landlords and letting agencies in Belfast to lower their rent prices to local housing benefit levels and protesting against landlords and letting agencies that would not and that issued threats of eviction. The campaign has achieved some level of success.

IRSP members have publicly supported the 2022 Russian invasion of Ukraine, and the INLA have been accused of receiving "dark money" from the Russian state. On 25 February 2022, one day after the invasion of Ukraine, the party affirmed its support for the Russian-controlled Donetsk People's Republic in a social media post in which they called Ukraine a "Nazi regime" and a "NATO puppet". It included a picture of IRSP members posing in front of Free Derry Corner with the flags of the Soviet Union and the Donetsk Republic. This was condemned by local SDLP councillors.

During the East Wall protests in November 2022, the IRSP opposed the housing of 380 refugees due to the absence of notice given to residents about the move prior to arrival and the feasibility of using the housing there for a large number of refugees. They said the residents were not opposed to refugees, just the lack of notice and uncertainty of feasibility. This differed to the majority of other groups who opposed any housing of refugees, regardless of notice.

== Policies and ideology ==
The IRSP are Marxist–Leninist and Irish republican, seeking the establishment of an all-Ireland "worker's republic". As of 2009, the IRSP stated that their objective will only be achieved exclusively through peaceful and political means, and in 2018 they launched the 'Yes For Unity' campaign, to campaign for a Border Poll on Irish Unity.

Like many republican socialist groups, the IRSP claim the legacy of the early 20th century republican James Connolly and say their policies are the "logical development in the twenty-first century of the programme established under Connolly's leadership by the Irish Socialist Republican Party".

=== Republican paramilitarism ===
The IRSP is associated with the Irish National Liberation Army (INLA) paramilitary group. It opposes both the Good Friday Agreement and the Northern Ireland Peace Process. The party supports a 'No First Strike' policy, which it says allows people to see the failure of the peace process for themselves without taking military action.

In 2009, the INLA ordered an end to its armed campaign. It says that, unlike during the Troubles, the current political situation allows the IRSP to contest fairly in local elections. The INLA admitted to "faults and grievous errors" in their campaign, stating that "innocent people were killed and injured" and offering "as revolutionaries" a "sincere and heartfelt apology".

=== European Union ===
The IRSP supported Brexit and advocates the Republic of Ireland leaving the European Union. While acknowledging some benefits of European Union (EU) membership, the party believes that EU membership is incompatible with a socialist society. The IRSP instead promotes greater co-operation between European socialist political organisations.

=== NATO and Russia ===
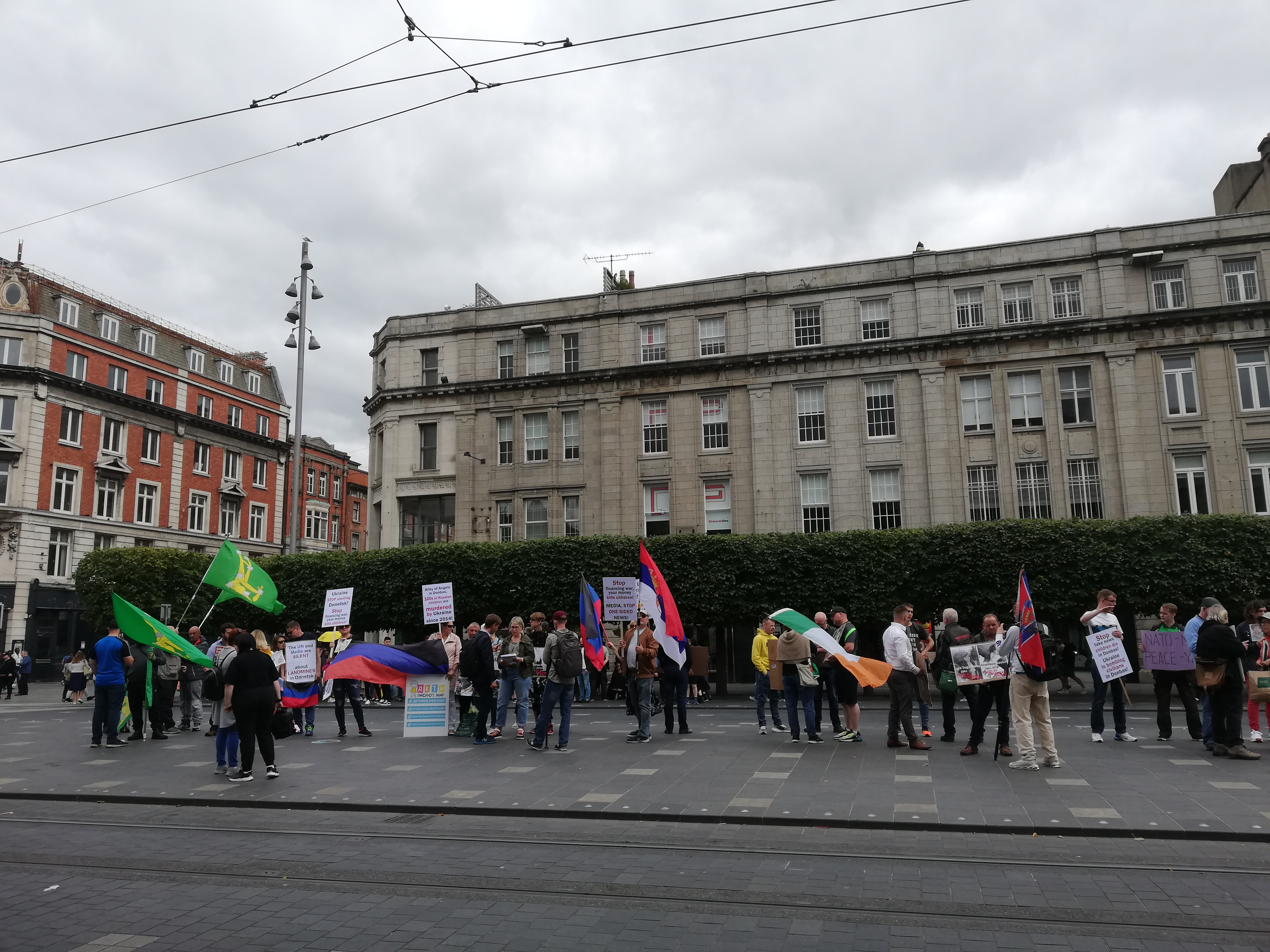
Pro-Russian protest in Dublin attended by IRSP members, August 2022

The IRSP supports Russia and Russian proxy forces fighting against Ukraine in the Russo-Ukrainian War. It expresses solidarity with the Russian-controlled Donetsk People's Republic and condemns the "Ukrainian regime". The IRSP refers to the invasion of Ukraine by the Russian government term "special military operation". The party blames the war on "NATO expansionism" rather than Russia. It boasts about the INLA's bombing of a radar station on Mount Gabriel, County Cork in 1982, which it said was used by NATO. In August 2022, IRSP members and Russian nationalists staged a protest against the Ukrainian military, outside Dublin's General Post Office. The Irish security services say that the Russian government were involved in organizing the protest through its Dublin embassy.

=== Broad Front ===
The IRSP supports the formation of what it calls the "Broad Front" which would bring together all Irish "anti-imperialist forces" to bring about a United Ireland. This would be formed on the basis of the following demands:

- The United Kingdom must formally renounce all claims of sovereignty in Ireland
- All British forces in Northern Ireland must be withdrawn, all republican and socialist prisoners must be released, a general amnesty must be granted to republicans for offences committed by them during the Troubles and "repressive legislation" must be replaced by a bill of rights
- The United Kingdom "must also agree to compensate the Irish People for the exploitation which has already occurred"

=== Policing ===
The IRSP is in favour of an All-Ireland, democratically controlled, unarmed police force.

The IRSP views the reforming of the RUC into the PSNI as a cosmetic exercise and strongly opposes 'political policing' by the PSNI. They demand an immediate cessation of the activities of MI5 in the North and calls for their expulsion from Ireland.

The IRSP does not believe that there is an independent judiciary, or an impartial judicial system, and that the judiciary both North and South presides over the laws which were enacted by "partitionist" governments and representing the interests of the ruling class.

=== Abstentionism ===
The IRSP are not abstentionist in principle, but they would support abstentionism in certain situations for tactical reasons.

The IRSP says it will consider contesting any particular election on the basis of a thorough analysis of the conditions prevailing at the time.

=== Social policies ===
The IRSP believes that the right to a home is a fundamental human right and that the state has a responsibility to deal with homelessness.

The party's policy on abortion is that it should be legalised, available on demand and free of charge.

== Elections ==
In May 1981, party members Gerry Kelly and Sean Flynn won two seats on the Belfast City Council in a joint campaign with the People's Democracy party. Neither councillor served a full term, with one going on the run after being implicated during the supergrass trials.

In June 1981, the IRSP ran two candidates, Kevin Lynch and Tony O'Hara (brother of Patsy O'Hara), in the Irish parliamentary election as Independent Anti H-Block candidates. Neither candidate won, but Lynch received 3,337 votes (7.63%) and came within 300 votes of winning a seat in Waterford, while O'Hara received 3,034 votes (6.49%) in Dublin West. In 1982, party member Brigid Makowski won a seat on the Shannon Town Commission.

The IRSP put forward five candidates in the 2011 Northern Ireland local elections, its first foray into electoral politics in almost 30 years. They failed to secure any seats. Candidate Paul Gallagher of Strabane missed out on a seat by just a single vote. He was originally elected but after a requested recount by the SDLP his election was overturned.

The IRSP has explained its lack of participation in elections as due to "very limited" resources.

In 2022 for the first time the IRSP fielded candidates for the Northern Ireland Assembly election. Initially their candidates were rejected by the Electoral Commission, but this was eventually corrected. Candidates were fielded in Belfast West (1,103 first preference votes, 2.5%) and Foyle (766 first preference votes, 1.6%).

Northern Ireland Assembly
Election	First Preference Vote	%	Seats	±	Government
2022	1,869	0.2% (#11)	0 / 90		No seats

Local elections
Election	First Preference Vote	%	Seats
1981	3,654	0.5%	2 / 523
2011	2,133	0.3%	0 / 572
2023	825	0.1%	0 / 462

== Publications ==
The Starry Plough (Irish: An Camchéachta) is the official newsletter (initially a newspaper, then a magazine) of the party. In 2006 it proclaimed on its website that "The Starry Plough is the only paper that stands firmly against British rule and for the destruction of capitalism in Ireland."

The name of the paper is taken from the flag of the same name. The decision to use the name the Starry Plough was inspired by a newspaper produced by Official Sinn Féin in Derry City in the early 1970s. Produced by the local branch of Official Sinn Féin in Derry, it was edited by Jackie Ward (who went on to edit The United Irishman) and Joe Sweeney (who sided with the IRSP following the split with the Officials). The suggestion for the IRSP newspaper was made by Derry members to the IRSP Ard Comhairle in early 1975. The Irish translation An Camchéachta was provided by Mairin Bean Ui Chionnaith, an Irish-language scholar and republican.

The first edition of the new (IRSP) The Starry Plough was published in April 1975 under the editorship of Mick Ahern. It included details of the first IRSP public meeting (Dublin, 12 February), an editorial on the IRSP, an interview with Seamus Costello, Easter Rising commemoration notices and a statement from the National Executive of the IRSP.

Subsequent editors included Osgur Breatnach, James Daly, Mary Reid, Seamus Ruddy and (again) Mick Ahern. Important contributors have included Bernadette McAliskey, Tom Hayes, Ite Ni Chionnaith, Eamonn McCann, Niall Leonach, Redmond O'Hanlon, Gerry Lawless, Siobhan Molloy, and London SWP cartoonist Phil Evans.

== Membership ==
Party members are often referred to as the "Irps" (pronounced "Erps"). In the late 1970s, Divis Flats in west Belfast became colloquially known as "the planet of the Irps" (a reference to the IRSP and the film Planet of the Apes).

== International representation ==
The party is represented in North America by the Irish Republican Socialist Committees of North America.

== List of secretaries ==
- Kevin Morley
- John Martin
- Mick Plunkett
