= Anti-Catholicism in the United Kingdom =

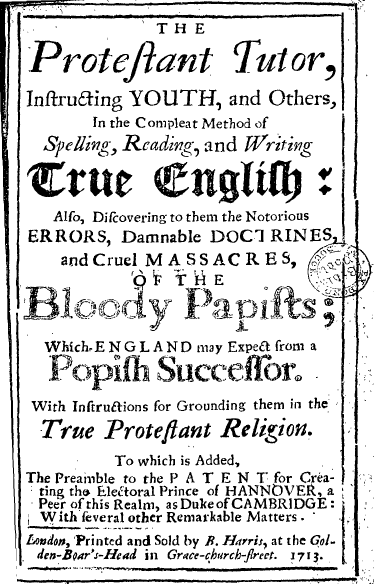
The Protestant Tutor, by Benjamin Harris

Anti-Catholicism in the United Kingdom dates back to the martyrdom of Saint Alban in the Roman era. Attacks on the Church from a Protestant angle mostly began with the English and Irish Reformations which were launched by King Henry VIII and the Scottish Reformation which was led by John Knox. Within England, the Act of Supremacy 1534 declared the English crown to be "the only supreme head on earth of the Church in England" in place of the Pope. Any act of allegiance to the latter was considered treasonous because the papacy claimed both spiritual and political power over its followers. Ireland was brought under direct English control starting in 1536 during the Tudor conquest of Ireland. The Scottish Reformation in 1560 abolished Catholic ecclesiastical structures and rendered Catholic practice illegal in Scotland. Today, anti-Catholicism remains present in the United Kingdom, particularly in Scotland and Northern Ireland.

Anti-Catholicism among many of the English was grounded in the fact that the Holy See sought not only to regain its traditional religious and spiritual authority over the English Church, but was also covertly backing regime change in alliance with Philip II of Spain as a means to ending the religious persecution of Catholics throughout the British Isles. In 1570, Pope Pius V declared Elizabeth I who ruled England and Ireland deposed and excommunicated with the papal bull Regnans in Excelsis, which also released all Elizabeth's subjects from their allegiance to her. This rendered conditions impossible even for Elizabeth's subjects, like Richard Gwyn and Robert Southwell, who were completely apolitical but persisted in their allegiance to the Catholic Church in England and Wales, as the Queen and her officials refused to accept that her subjects could maintain both allegiances at once. The Recusancy Acts, legally coercing English, Welsh, and Irish citizens to conform to Anglicanism and attend weekly services on pain of prosecution for high treason, date from Elizabeth's reign. Later, regicide and decapitation strike plots organized by persecuted Catholics were heavily exploited by the Crown for propaganda and further fuelled anti-Catholicism in England. In 1603, James VI of Scotland became also James I of England and Ireland.

The Glorious Revolution of 1689 involved the overthrow of King James II, who converted to Catholicism before he became king and sought to implement both Catholic emancipation and freedom of religion, and his replacement by son-in-law William III, a Dutch Calvinist. The Act of Settlement 1701, which was passed by the Parliament of England, stated the heir to the throne must not be a "Papist" and that any heir who is a Catholic or who marries one will be excluded from the succession to the throne "for ever." This law was extended to Scotland through the Act of Union which formed Great Britain. The Act was amended in 2013 as regards marriage to a Catholic and the ecumenical movement has contributed to reducing sectarian tensions between Christians in the country.

== Beginnings ==
=== English Reformation ===
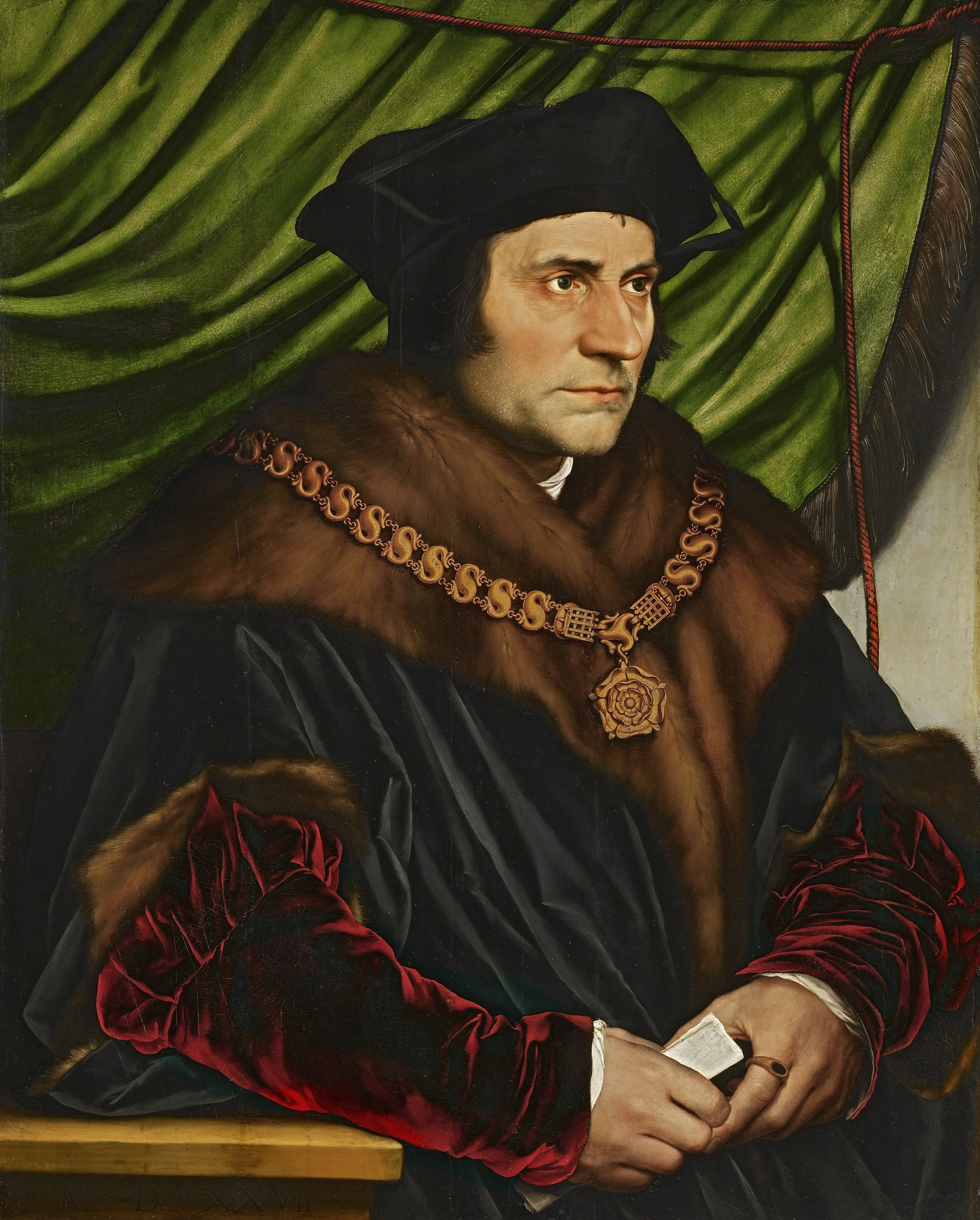
Sir Thomas More, the Catholic government official executed in 1535 by King Henry VIII

The Act of Supremacy issued by King Henry VIII in 1534 declared the king to be "the only supreme head on earth of the Church in England" in place of the pope. Any act of allegiance to the latter was considered treasonous because the papacy claimed both spiritual and political power over its followers. It was under this act that Thomas More and John Fisher were executed and became martyrs to the Catholic faith.

The Act of Supremacy (which asserted England's independence from papal authority) was repealed in 1554 by Henry's devoutly Catholic daughter Queen Mary I when she reinstituted Catholicism as England's state religion. She executed many Protestants by burning. Her actions were reversed by a new Act of Supremacy passed in 1559 under her successor, Elizabeth I, along with an Act of Uniformity which made worship in Church of England compulsory. Anyone who took office in the English church or government was required to take the Oath of Supremacy; penalties for violating it included hanging and quartering. Attendance at Anglican services became obligatory—those who refused to attend Anglican services, whether Roman Catholics or Puritans, were fined and physically punished as recusants.

=== Elizabethan regime ===
English anti-Catholicism was grounded in the fear that the Pope sought to reimpose not just religio-spiritual authority but also secular power over England, a view which was vindicated by hostile actions of the Vatican. In 1570, Pope Pius V sought to depose Elizabeth with the papal bull Regnans in Excelsis, declaring her a heretic and dissolving Catholics' duty of allegiance to her. This engendered a state of war between the Pope and England, escalating to extended hostilities and culminating in a failed 1588 invasion by Spanish forces.

Elizabeth's resultant persecution of Catholic Jesuit missionaries led to many executions at Tyburn. Priests like Edmund Campion who suffered there as traitors to England are considered martyrs by the Catholic Church, and a number of them were canonized as the Forty Martyrs of England and Wales. In the 20th century, a "Shrine of the Martyrs at Tyburn" was established at the Catholic Tyburn Convent in London.

==== Foxe's Book of Martyrs ====
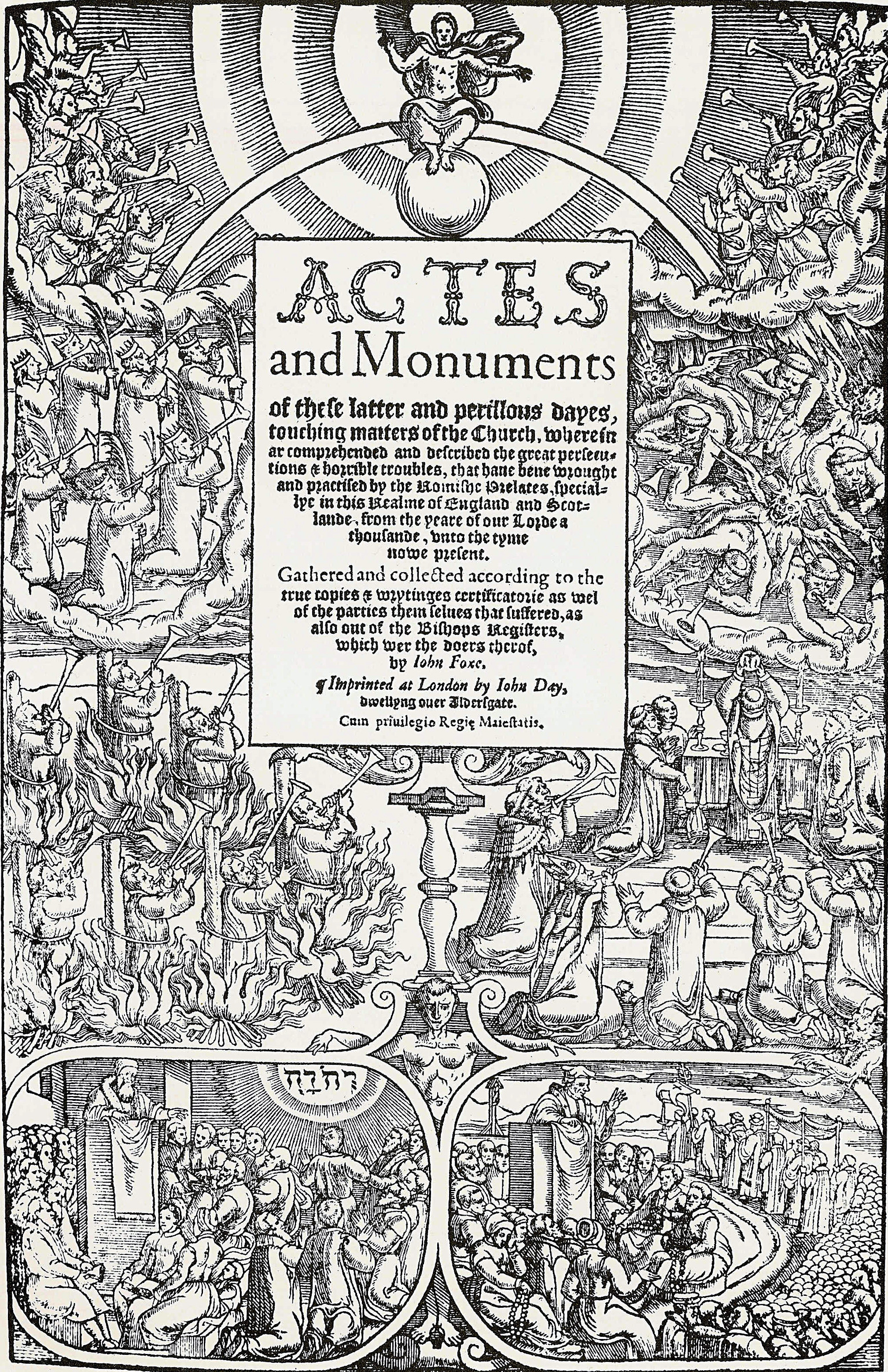
Foxe's Book of Martyrs helped shape lasting popular notions of Catholicism in Britain.

The persecution of the adherents of the reformed religion, both Anglicans and Nonconformist Protestants alike, which had occurred during the reign of Elizabeth's elder half-sister Queen Mary I, was used in the time of Elizabeth I to fuel strong anti-Catholic propaganda in the hugely influential Foxe's Book of Martyrs. Those who had died in Mary's reign, under the Marian Persecutions, were effectively canonised by this work of hagiography.

In 1571, the Convocation of the Church of England ordered that copies of the Book of Martyrs should be kept for public inspection in all cathedrals and in the houses of church dignitaries. The book was also displayed in many Anglican parish churches alongside the Holy Bible. The passionate intensity of its style and its vivid and picturesque dialogues made the book very popular among Puritan and Low Church families, Anglican and nonconformist Protestant, down to the nineteenth century. In a period of extreme partisanship on all sides of the religious debate, the partisan church history of the earlier portion of the book, with its grotesque stories of popes and monks, contributed to anti-Catholic prejudices in England, as did the story of the sufferings of several hundred reformers who had been burned at the stake under Mary and Bishop Bonner.

== 17th- and 18th-century polemics ==
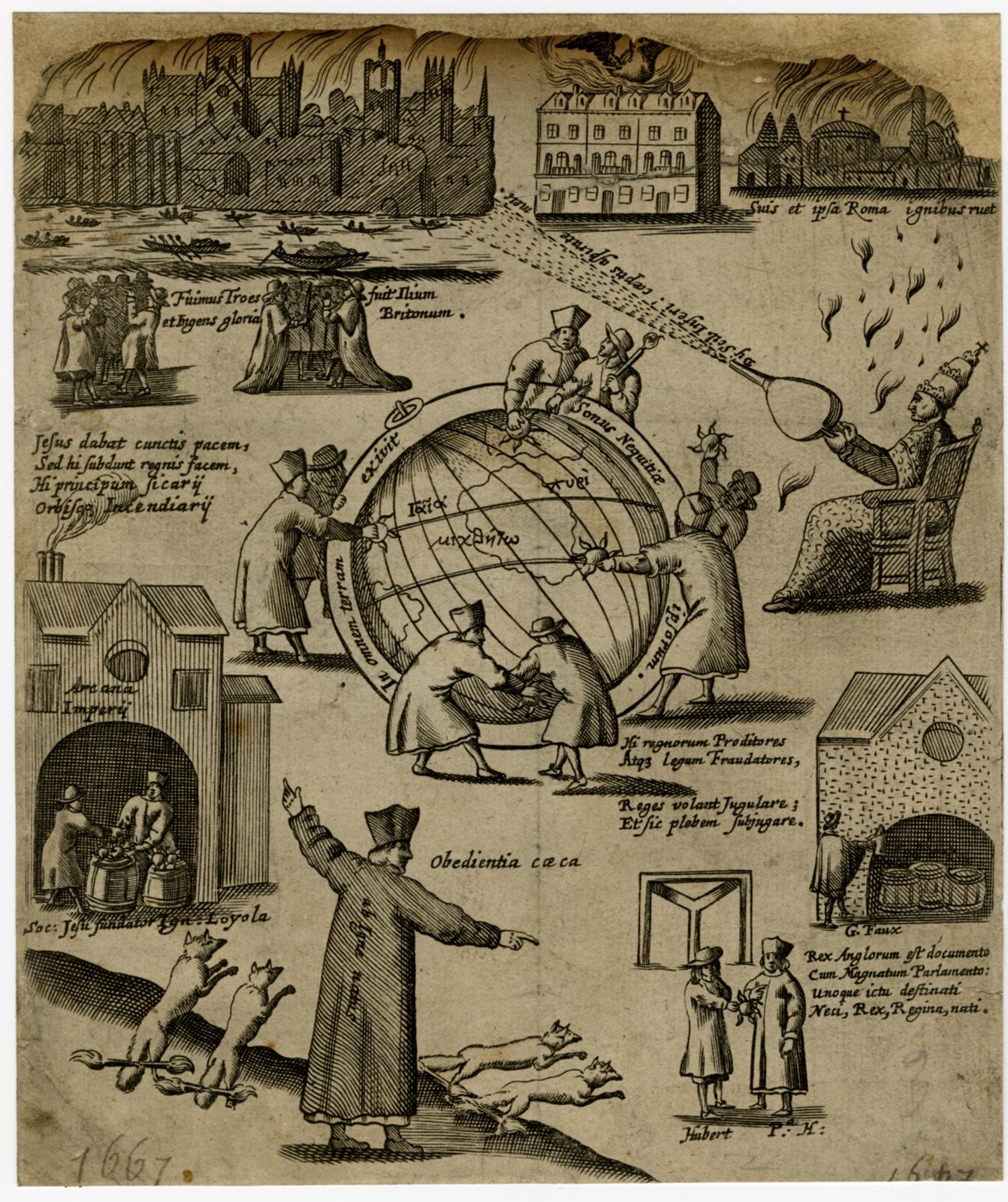
Frontispiece to Pyrotechnica Loyalana, Ignatian Fire-Works suggesting Catholics in general and Jesuits in particular were responsible for the Great Fire of London, as well as other misfortunes around the world. In the centre 8 men, 4 of which dressed as Jesuits throw Hand Grenades at a globe, while the pope uses a set of bellows to fan the flames of fires in London and Rome. At the bottom of the image a Jesuit releases four foxes with firebrands tied to their tails, while Guy Fawkes is shown entering the vault beneath Parliament and Robert Hubert, the man who falsely confessed to starting the Great Fire of London, conspires with William Barrow, one of the accused in the Popish Plot.

Later several accusations fuelled strong anti-Catholicism in England including the Gunpowder Plot, in which Guy Fawkes and other Catholic conspirators were found guilty of planning to blow up the English Parliament on the day the King was to open it. The Great Fire of London in 1666 was blamed on the Catholics and an inscription ascribing it to 'Popish frenzy' was engraved on the Monument to the Great Fire of London, which marked the location where the fire started (this inscription was only removed in 1831). The 'Popish Plot' involving Titus Oates further exacerbated Anglican-Catholic relations.

The beliefs that underlie the sort of strong anti-Catholicism once seen in the United Kingdom were summarized by William Blackstone in his Commentaries on the Laws of England:

As to papists, what has been said of the Protestant dissenters would hold equally strong for a general toleration of them; provided their separation was founded only upon difference of opinion in religion, and their principles did not also extend to a subversion of the civil government. If once they could be brought to renounce the supremacy of the pope, they might quietly enjoy their seven sacraments, their purgatory, and auricular confession; their worship of relics and images; nay even their transubstantiation. But while they acknowledge a foreign power, superior to the sovereignty of the kingdom, they cannot complain if the laws of that kingdom will not treat them upon the footing of good subjects..

— Bl. Comm. IV, c.4 ss. iii.2, p. *54

The gravamen of this charge, then, is that Catholics constitute an imperium in imperio, a sort of fifth column of persons who owe a greater allegiance to the Pope than they do to the civil government, a charge very similar to that repeatedly leveled against Jews. Accordingly, a large body of British laws such as the Popery Act 1698, collectively known as the Penal Laws, imposed various civil disabilities and legal penalties on recusant Catholics.

A change of attitude was eventually signalled by the Papists Act 1778 in the reign of King George III. Under this Act, an oath was imposed, which besides being a declaration of loyalty to the reigning sovereign, contained an abjuration of Charles Edward Stuart, the Pretender to the British throne, and of certain doctrines attributed to Roman Catholics (doctrines such as those stating that excommunicated princes may lawfully be murdered, that no faith should be kept with heretics, and that the Pope has temporal as well as spiritual jurisdiction in the realm). Those taking this oath were exempted from some of the provisions of the Popery Act. The section as to taking and prosecuting priests were repealed, as also the penalty of perpetual imprisonment for keeping a school. Catholics were also enabled to inherit and purchase land, nor was a Protestant heir any longer empowered to enter and enjoy the estate of his Catholic kinsman. However, the passing of this act was the occasion of the anti-Catholic Gordon riots (1780) in which the violence of the mob was especially directed against Lord Mansfield who had balked at various prosecutions under the statutes now repealed. The anti-clerical excesses of the French Revolution and the consequent emigration to England of Catholic priests from France led to a softening of opinion towards Catholics on the part of the English Anglican establishment, resulting in the Roman Catholic Relief Act 1791 which allowed Catholics to enter the legal profession, relieved them from taking the Oath of Supremacy, and granted toleration for their schools and places of worship The repeal of the Penal Laws culminated in the Roman Catholic Relief Act 1829.

== 19th century ==
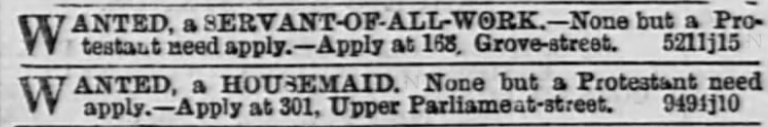
"None but a Protestant need apply" advertisements in the Liverpool Daily Post, June 10, 1861.

Despite the Emancipation Act, however, anti-Catholic attitudes persisted throughout the 19th century, particularly following the sudden massive Irish Catholic migration to England during the Great Famine.

The forces of anti-Catholicism were defeated by the unexpected mass mobilization of Catholic activists in Ireland, led by Daniel O'Connell. The Catholics had long been passive but now there was a clear threat of insurrection that troubled Prime Minister Wellington and his aide Robert Peel. The passage of Catholic emancipation in 1829, which allowed Catholics to sit in Parliament, opened the way for a large Irish Catholic contingent. Lord Shaftesbury (1801–1885), a prominent philanthropist, was a pre-millennial evangelical Anglican who believed in the imminent second coming of Christ, and became a leader in anti-Catholicism. He strongly opposed the Oxford Movement in the Church of England, fearful of its high church Catholics features. In 1845, he denounced the Maynooth Grant which funded the Catholic seminary in Ireland that would train many priests.

The re-establishment of the Roman Catholic ecclesiastical hierarchy in England in 1850 by Pope Pius IX, was followed by a frenzy of anti-Catholic feeling, often stoked by newspapers. Examples include an effigy of Cardinal Wiseman, the new head of the restored hierarchy, being paraded through the streets and burned on Bethnal Green, and graffiti proclaiming 'No popery!' being chalked on walls. Charles Kingsley wrote a vigorously anti-Catholic book Hypatia (1853). The novel was mainly aimed at the embattled Catholic minority in England, who had recently emerged from a half-illegal status.

New Catholic episcopates, which ran parallel to the established Anglican episcopates, and a Catholic conversion drive awakened fears of 'papal aggression' and relations between the Catholic Church and the establishment remained frosty. At the end of the nineteenth century one contemporary wrote that "the prevailing opinion of the religious people I knew and loved was that Roman Catholic worship is idolatry, and that it was better to be an Atheist than a Papist".

The Liberal party leader William Ewart Gladstone had a complex ambivalence about Catholicism. He was attracted by its international success in majestic traditions. More important, he was strongly opposed to the authoritarianism of its pope and bishops, its profound public opposition to liberalism, and its refusal to distinguish between secular allegiance on the one hand and spiritual obedience on the other. The danger came when the pope or bishops attempted to exert temporal power, as in the Vatican decrees of 1870 as the climax of the papal attempt to control churches in different nations, despite their independent nationalism. His polemical pamphlet against the infallibility declaration of the Catholic Church sold 150,000 copies in 1874. He urged Catholics to obey the crown and disobey the pope when there was disagreement. On the other hand, when religion ritualistic practices in the Church of England came under attack as too ritualistic and too much akin to Catholicism, Gladstone strongly opposed passage of the Public Worship Regulation Bill in 1874.

Benjamin Disraeli, the long-time Conservative leader, wrote many novels. One of the last was Lothair (1870) – it was "Disraeli's ideological Pilgrim's Progress". It tells a story of political life with particular regard to the roles of the Anglican and Roman Catholic churches. It reflected anti-Catholicism of the sort that was popular in Britain, and which fuelled support for Italian unification (the "Risorgimento").

== World War II, the post-war period and ecumenism ==
During World War II, British public opinion was strongly in favor of the bombing of the city of Rome, including the Vatican, with several notable public figure, such as H.G. Wells being particularly vocal proponents of doing so.

Since World War II anti-Catholic feeling in England has somewhat, though not entirely abated. Ecumenical dialogue between Anglicans and Catholics culminated in the first meeting of an Archbishop of Canterbury with a Pope since the Reformation when Archbishop Geoffrey Fisher visited Rome in 1960. Since then, dialogue has continued through envoys and standing conferences.

Residual anti-Catholicism in England is represented by the burning of an effigy of the Catholic conspirator Guy Fawkes at local celebrations on Guy Fawkes Night every 5 November. In many places, this celebration has, however, largely lost any sectarian connotation and the allied tradition of burning an effigy of the Pope on this day has been discontinued – except in the town of Lewes, Sussex. The "Calvinistic Methodists" represented a militant core of anti-Catholics.

As a result of the 1701 Act of Settlement, any member of the British royal family who joins the Catholic Church must renounce the throne. The Succession to the Crown Act 2013 allows members to marry a Roman Catholic without incurring this ban.

Opposition to the state visit by Pope Benedict XVI to the United Kingdom can be found on that page.

On the 24th of October 2025, King Charles III and Pope Leo XIV prayed together during the king's visit to the Vatican, marking the first time in over 500 years that the heads of both churches have prayed together.

== Ireland under British control ==
Ireland's Catholic majority was subjected to persecution from the time of the English Reformation under Henry VIII. This persecution intensified when the Gaelic clan system was completely destroyed by the governments of Elizabeth I and her successor, James I. Land was appropriated either by the conversion of native Anglo-Irish aristocrats or by forcible seizure. Many Catholics were dispossessed and their lands given to Anglican and Nonconformist Protestant settlers from Britain. However, the first plantation in Ireland was a Catholic plantation under Queen Mary I; for more see Plantations of Ireland.

To cement the power of the Anglican Ascendancy, political and land-owning rights were denied to Ireland's Catholics by law, following the Glorious Revolution in England and consequent turbulence in Ireland. The Penal Laws, established first in the 1690s, assured Church of Ireland control of political, economic and religious life. The Mass, ordination, and the presence in Ireland of Catholic Bishops were all banned, although some did carry on secretly. Catholic schools were also banned, as were all voting franchises. Violent persecution also resulted, leading to the torture and execution of many Catholics, both clergy and laity. Since then, many have been canonised and beatified by the Vatican, such as Saint Oliver Plunkett, Blessed Dermot O'Hurley, and Blessed Margaret Ball.

Although some of the Penal Laws restricting Catholic access to landed property were repealed between 1778 and 1782, this did not end anti-Catholic agitation and violence. Catholic competition with Protestants in County Armagh for leases intensified, driving up prices and provoking resentment of Anglicans and Nonconformist Protestants alike. Then in 1793, the Roman Catholic Relief Act enfranchised forty shilling freeholders in the counties, thus increasing the political value of Catholic tenants to landlords. In addition, Catholics began to enter the linen weaving trade, thus depressing Protestant wage rates. From the 1780s the Protestant Peep O'Day Boys grouping began attacking Catholic homes and smashing their looms. In addition, the Peep O'Day Boys disarmed Catholics of any weapons they were holding. A Catholic group called the Defenders was formed in response to these attacks. This climaxed in the Battle of the Diamond on 21 September 1795 outside the small village of Loughgall between Peep O' Day boys and the Defenders. Roughly 30 Catholic Defenders but none of the better armed Peep O'Day Boys were killed in the fight. Hundreds of Catholic homes and at least one Church were burnt out in the aftermath of the skirmish. After the battle Daniel Winter, James Wilson, and James Sloan changed the name of the Peep O' Day Boys to the Orange Order devoted to maintaining the Protestant ascendency.

Although more of the Penal Laws were repealed, and Catholic emancipation in 1829 ensured political representation at Westminster, significant anti-Catholic hostility remained especially in Belfast where the Catholic population was in the minority. In the same year, the Presbyterians reaffirmed at the Synod of Ulster that the Pope was the anti-Christ, and joined the Orange Order in large numbers when the latter organisation opened its doors to all non-Catholics in 1834. As the Orange order grew, violence against Catholics became a regular feature of Belfast life. Towards the end of the nineteenth and early twentieth century when Irish Home Rule became imminent, Protestant fears and opposition towards it were articulated under the slogan "Home Rule means Rome Rule".

== Constituent countries ==
=== Scotland ===
In the 16th century, the Scottish Reformation resulted in Scotland's conversion to Presbyterianism through the Church of Scotland. The revolution resulted in a powerful hatred of the Roman Church. High Anglicanism also came under intense persecution after Charles I attempted to reform the Church of Scotland. The attempted reforms caused chaos, however, because they were seen as being overly Catholic in form, being based heavily on sacraments and ritual.

Over the course of later medieval and early modern history violence against Catholics has broken out, often resulting in deaths, such as the torture and execution of Jesuit Saint John Ogilvie.

In the last 150 years, Irish migration to Scotland increased dramatically. As time has gone on Scotland has become much more open to other religions and Catholics have seen the nationalisation of their schools and the restoration of the Church hierarchy. Even in the area of politics, there are changes. The Orange Order has grown in numbers in recent times. This growth is, however, attributed by some to the rivalry between Rangers and Celtic football clubs as opposed to actual hatred of Catholics.

Historian Tom Devine, who grew up in a family with Irish Catholic roots in the west of Scotland, described his youth as follows:

Among my own family in a Lanarkshire town in the 1950s it was accepted that discriminatory employment practices against Catholics were endemic in the local steel industry, the police, banking and even some high-street shops. And until the 1960s in some of the Clyde shipyards, the power of the foremen with Orange and Masonic loyalties to hire and fire often made it difficult for Catholics to start apprenticeships.

However, although Devine accepts that anti-Catholic attitudes do exist in some areas of Scotland, especially in West Central Scotland, he has argued that discrimination against Catholics in Scotland's economic, social and political life is no longer systemic in the way it once was. Devine cited survey and research data collected in the 1990s which indicated that there was little difference in the social class of Catholics and non-Catholics in contemporary Scotland, and highlighted increased Catholic representation in politics and the professions, describing the change as a "silent revolution". Devine has suggested that a number of factors are responsible for this change: radical structural changes in the Scottish economy, with the decline of manufacturing industries where sectarian prejudices were ingrained; the increase of foreign investment in high-tech industry in Silicon Glen and the post-war expansion of the public sector; the construction of the welfare state and growth of educational opportunities, which provided avenues for social mobility and increased interfaith marriages with Catholics.

In 1937, ten young men and boys, aged from 13 to 23, burned to death in a fire on a farm in Kirkintilloch. All were seasonal workers from Achill Sound in County Mayo, Ireland. The Vanguard, the official newspaper of the Scottish Protestant League, referred to the event in the following text:

The Scandal of Kirkintilloch is not that some Irishmen have lost their lives in a fire; it is that Irish Papists brought up in disloyalty and superstition are engaged in jobs which should belong by right to Scottish Protestants.

The Kirkintilloch sensation again reminds the People of Scotland that Rome's Irish Scum still over-run our land.

Sectarianism was a part of the 1994 Monklands East by-election.

Although there is a popular perception in Scotland that anti-Catholicism is football related (specifically directed against fans of Celtic F.C.), statistics released in 2004 by the Scottish Executive showed that 85% of sectarian attacks were not football related. Sixty-three percent of the victims of sectarian attacks are Catholics, but when adjusted for population size this makes Catholics between five and eight times more likely to be a victim of a sectarian attack than a Protestant.

Due to the fact that many Catholics in Scotland today have Irish ancestry, there is considerable overlap between anti-Irish attitudes and anti-Catholicism. For example, the word "Fenian" is regarded by authorities as a sectarian-related word in reference to Catholics.

In 2003, the Scottish Parliament passed the Criminal Justice (Scotland) Act 2003 which included provisions to make an assault motivated by the perceived religion of the victim an aggravating factor.

Police Scotland statistics in 2024 reveal that 33% of recorded religious hate crimes in Scotland were directed against Catholics, with Catholics making up just 13% of the population.

=== Northern Ireland ===
The state of Northern Ireland came into existence in 1921, following the Government of Ireland Act 1920. Though Catholics were a majority on the island of Ireland, comprising 73.8% of the population in 1911, they were a third of the population in Northern Ireland.

On 21 July 1920, rioting broke out in Belfast, starting in the shipyards and spreading to residential areas. The violence was partly in response to the IRA killing in Cork of a northern RIC police officer Gerald Smyth, and also because of competition for jobs due to the high unemployment rates. Protestant Loyalists marched on the Harland and Wolff shipyards in Belfast and forced over 11,000 Catholic and left-wing Protestant workers from their jobs. This sectarian action is often referred to as the Belfast Pogrom. The sectarian rioting that followed resulted in about 20 deaths in just three days.

In 1934, Sir James Craig, the first Prime Minister of Northern Ireland, said, "Since we took up office we have tried to be absolutely fair towards all the citizens of Northern Ireland... They still boast of Southern Ireland being a Catholic State. All I boast of is that we are a Protestant Parliament and a Protestant State."

In 1957, Harry Midgley, the Minister of Education in Northern Ireland, said, in Portadown Orange Hall, "All the minority are traitors and have always been traitors to the Government of Northern Ireland."

The first Catholic to be appointed a minister in Northern Ireland was Gerard Newe, in 1971.

In 1986, at the annual conference of the Democratic Unionist Party, MP for Mid Ulster William McCrea interrupted councillor Ethel Smyth when she said she regretted the death of Sean Downes, a 24-year-old Catholic civilian who had been killed by a plastic bullet fired by the Royal Ulster Constabulary (RUC) during an anti-internment march in Andersontown in 1984. McCrea shouted, "No. No. I'll not condemn the death of John Downes [sic]. No Fenian. Never. No". In Northern Ireland, Fenian is used by some as a derogatory word for Roman Catholics.

The Troubles in Northern Ireland were characterised by bitter sectarian antagonism and bloodshed between Irish republicans, a majority of whom are Catholic, and Loyalists the overwhelming majority of whom are Protestant. A Catholic church in Harryville, Ballymena was the site of a series of long-lasting protests by Loyalists in the late 1990s. Church services were often cancelled due to the level of intimidation and violence experienced by those attending. Some Catholics were injured when trying to attend mass and their cars parked nearby were also vandalised.

Some of the most savage attacks were perpetrated by a Protestant gang dubbed the Shankill Butchers, led by Lenny Murphy who was described as a psychopath and a sadist. The gang gained notoriety by torturing and murdering an estimated thirty Catholics between 1972 and 1982. Most of their victims had no connection to the Provisional Irish Republican Army or any other republican groups but were killed for no other reason than their religious affiliation. Murphy's killing spree is the theme of the British film Resurrection Man (1998).

The Glenanne gang or Glenanne group was a secret informal alliance of loyalists who carried out shooting and bombing attacks against Catholics and Irish nationalists in the 1970s, during the Troubles. It also launched some attacks elsewhere in Northern Ireland and in the Republic of Ireland. The gang included British soldiers from the Ulster Defence Regiment (UDR), police officers from the RUC, and members of the Mid-Ulster Brigade of the Ulster Volunteer Force. Twenty-five British soldiers and police officers were named as purported members of the gang. Most of its attacks took place in the "murder triangle" area of counties Armagh and Tyrone in Northern Ireland.

Since the ceasefire, sectarian killings have largely ceased, though occasional sectarian murders are still reported and bad feelings between Catholics and Protestants linger.

== See also ==
- Anti-Catholicism in literature and media
- Anti-Catholicism in the United States
- Anti-clericalism
- Catholic emancipation
- Gordon Riots of 1780 in London
- Henry VIII of England
- Orange Order, the Protestant Irish
