= Jimmy Nesbitt (policeman) =

Northern Irish detective

- Taken close to Tennent Street station after Nesbitt's retirement
- Born: James Nesbitt; 29 September 1934; Belfast, Northern Ireland, UK
- Died: 27 August 2014 (aged 79)
- Occupation: Royal Ulster Constabulary Detective Chief Inspector
- Known for: Headed the investigation into the Shankill Butchers' killings
- Spouse: Marion Wilson
- Parent(s): James and Ellen Nesbitt

James Nesbitt MBE (29 September 1934 – 27 August 2014) was a Royal Ulster Constabulary (RUC) Detective Chief Inspector who was best known for having headed the Murder Squad team investigating the notorious Shankill Butchers' killings in the mid-1970s. Working from the C Division headquarters at Tennent Street off Shankill Road, Belfast, he eventually caught most of the "Butchers" which led to their convictions. Having received a total of 67 commendations throughout his career, this is the highest number for any policeman in the history of the United Kingdom. In 1980, he was appointed MBE "in recognition of his courage and success in combating terrorism".

== Early years ==
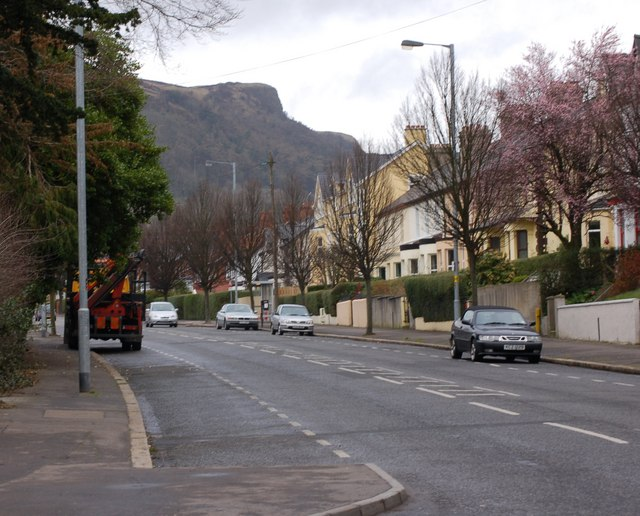
The Cavehill Road, north Belfast where Nesbitt grew up

Nesbitt was born in 1934 in Belfast, Northern Ireland, the son of James, an electrician, and Ellen. He was brought up in the Church of Ireland religion and lived with his parents and elder sister, Maureen in a terraced house in Cavehill Road, North Belfast which was considered to have been a middle-class area at the time. Having first attended the Model Primary School in Ballysillan Road, in 1946 he moved on to Belfast Technical High School where he excelled as a pupil. From an early age Nesbitt was fascinated by detective stories and dreamed about becoming a detective himself.

As a child he avidly read all the celebrated murder trials in the newspapers. At the age of 16, he opted to leave school and went to work as a sales representative for a linen company where he remained for seven years.

== Royal Ulster Constabulary ==
At the age of 23, Nesbitt sought a more exciting career and realised his childhood dream by joining the Royal Ulster Constabulary as a uniformed constable. He applied at the York Road station in Belfast and passed his entry exams. His first duty station was at Swatragh, County Londonderry . During this period the Irish Republican Army's Border Campaign was being waged. Nesbitt earned two commendations during the 12 months he spent at the Swatragh station, having fought off two separate IRA gun attacks which had seen a B Specials man shot. In 1958 he was transferred to Coleraine RUC station where his superiors granted him the opportunity to assist in detective work, and three years later was promoted to the rank of detective.

He married Marion Wilson in 1967 and began to raise a family. By 1971 he was back in his native Belfast and held the rank of Detective Sergeant. He had entered the RUC's CID section and was based at Musgrave Street station. Many members of the RUC found themselves targeted by both republican and loyalist paramilitaries as the conflict known as The Troubles grew in intensity during the late 1960s and early 1970s.

=== C Division ===
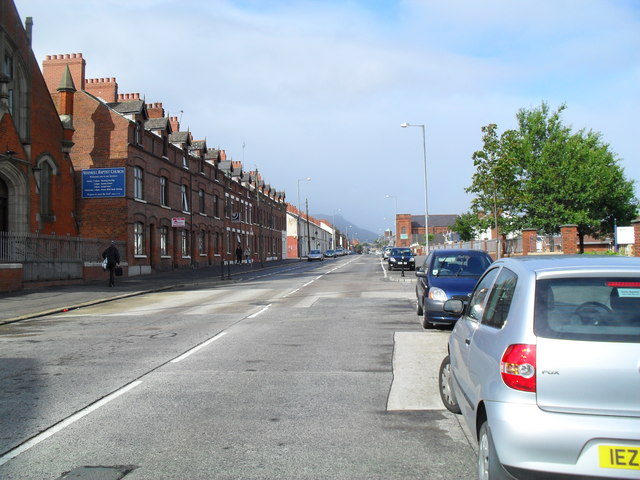
Tennent Street, Belfast where Nesbitt's C Division was based

In September 1973 he was promoted to Detective Inspector and moved to head up the RUC's C or "Charlie" Division based in Tennent Street, off the Shankill Road, the heartland of loyalism and home of many loyalist paramilitaries. C Division covered not only the Shankill but also the republican Ardoyne and "The Bone" areas. The area had already been subjected to bombing attacks, rioting, home-burnings, vigilante patrols, street barricades, random sectarian murders and killings as part of sporadic loyalist feuds. Nesbitt's responsibilities were immense as C Division covered an entire fifteen square mile district which contained a population of 150,000 and more sectarian killer gangs than any other district in Northern Ireland. Furthermore, the majority of the violence committed within an area of just three square miles contained every paramilitary group – loyalist and republican – which existed in Northern Ireland at that time. The UVF Brigade Staff (Belfast leadership) was based on the Shankill Road.

Shortly before he was sent to C Division his policing abilities were highly praised in this assessment,

He stimulates interest among his colleagues, often drawing on his personal experiences marrying theory with practice. He is thoroughly sound and reliable and upholds the best traditions of the Royal Ulster Constabulary. He brings great credit to the Force.

Although he encountered considerable suspicion from his subordinates when he arrived at Tennent Street, he managed to eventually create much camaraderie within the ranks of those under his command when before there had been rivalry and discord. C Division would lose a total of 12 men as a result of IRA attacks. Described by Martin Dillon as a controlled man, he was also friendly, generous and displayed a "black" sense of humour. Moreover, he was a devoted family man and highly respected by his subordinates, who typically addressed him as "Boss" or "Sir". Belfast News Letter journalist Bobbie Hanvey who interviewed him, described him as "gentle in manner, extremely soft-spoken and a dapper dresser.

During his tenure as Detective Chief Inspector at Tennent Street, Nesbitt and his team investigated a total of 311 killings and solved around 250 of the cases. Over one weekend in the 1970s, there were a total of nine murders committed in his district. He personally conducted interviews with some of the most ruthless and dangerous killers in Northern Ireland.

Two of the three cars used in the May 1974 Dublin and Monaghan bombings which had been carried out by the UVF's Belfast and Mid-Ulster brigades, were hijacked in Agnes Street and Torrens Road, both within Nesbitt's jurisdiction.

== Shankill Butchers' killings ==
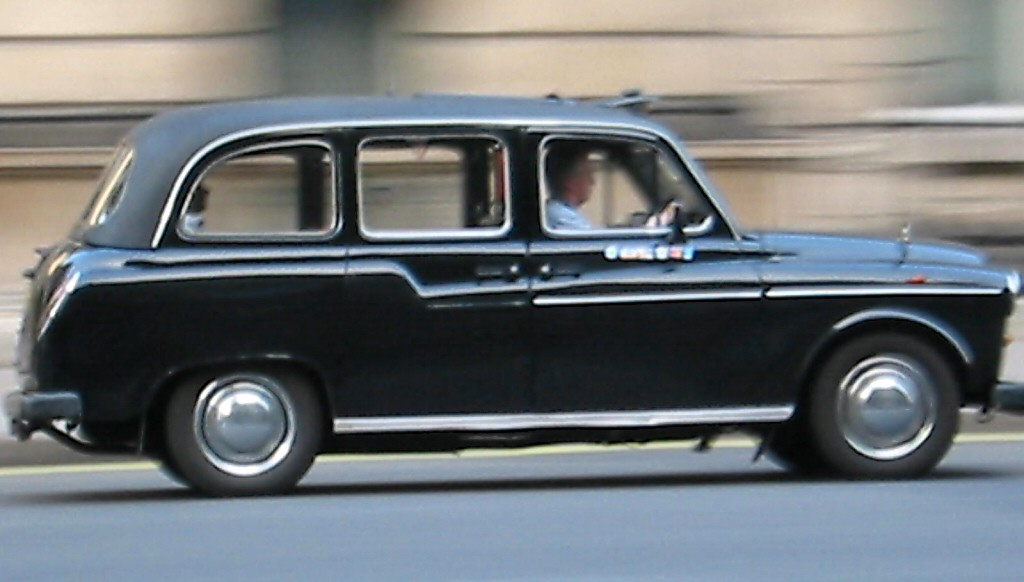
The Shankill Butchers used a black taxi similar to this one to abduct their victims

By 1975, Nesbitt was encountering death and serious injury on a daily basis as the violence in Northern Ireland showed no signs of abating; however towards the end of that year, he was faced with the first of a series of brutal killings that added a new dimension to the relentless tit-for-tat killings between Catholics and Protestants that had already made 1975 "one of the bloodiest years of the conflict". By this time he had already earned 48 commendations for his excellent detective work.

On the morning of 25 November after the body of Francis Crossin, a 34-year-old Catholic, was discovered in an entry between Silvio Street and Ambleside Street in the vicinity of Tennent Street station, Nesbitt and his Murder Squad which consisted of ten CID detectives, including himself, immediately launched an investigation into the savage killing. He had been in bed when he received a telephone call from the duty officer at the station advising him about the body "dumped on his patch". He arrived at the murder scene as the victim's body was being taken away by mortuary personnel. Nesbitt addressed his nine-man murder squad on 26 November with the following statement: "We're looking for somebody more brutal than the average terrorist and we'd better get to him". Crossin had had his throat slashed so deeply by his assailant that he was almost decapitated with just a tissue of flesh connecting the head to the trunk. When his corpse was found the head was lying almost at right angles to his body. Later Nesbitt's team of ten would be augmented by men from the Belfast Regional Crime Squad and an undercover surveillance team.

Less than three months later there was another killing. Following a telephone call to a Belfast newspaper made by a male caller using the pseudonym "Major Long of the Young Militants" on 7 February 1976, Nesbitt and his team found the body of Catholic man Joseph Quinn (55) lying facedown on a grass bank off Forthriver Way, in the Glencairn estate near the Upper Shankill as instructed by the caller. He had been badly beaten about the head and face and his throat deeply cut. The man calling himself "Major Long" had claimed Quinn was a "militant Republican" who had been killed in retaliation for the fatal shooting of two Protestant policemen by the IRA the day before. The name "Major Long" derived from "The Long Bar", one of the Shankill Road pubs the "Butchers" frequented and often set out from to carry out their killings as they had done on the night of 6/7 February. Nesbitt did not connect the name "Long" to the Shankill pub which was a known haunt by loyalist paramilitaries. On the morning of 23 February a woman who was putting out her rubbish in an entry that ran between Mayo Street and Esmond Street in the Shankill Road area discovered the body of Francis Rice (24). Rice, an unemployed Catholic road labourer, had his throat hacked through almost to the spine. Nesbitt concluded the latest killings were perpetrated by the same person or persons that had killed Crossin. By this stage the media was already using the term "the Butchers" to describe the killings. Despite Nesbitt and his men often working 18 hours a day, seven days a week in an attempt to apprehend the culprits, Nesbitt's major obstacles in solving the crime was the lack of manpower, resources and the reluctance of the local population to come forward out of fear of reprisals from paramilitaries. Furthermore, the killers left behind no witnesses or evidence which provided clues as to their identity.

When a paramilitary killing took place, Nesbitt and his Murder Squad were aided by other members of CID for at least three days. The detectives attempted to cover every patch of ground in the area where it was believed the paramilitaries operated. When the period of time terminated, the squad went back to teamwork and the other members of the force resumed their handling of crimes unconnected with paramilitary activity. Nesbitt and his men viewed all paramilitaries as criminals no matter from which community they originated.

He received his first lead in the "Butchers"' killings when the woman who found Francis Rice's body said that on the previous night she heard voices with Belfast accents in the entry off Esmond Street and the chugging noise of a taxi. Her home overlooked the entry and the sounds had been clearly audible. Black London-style taxis were frequently used in Belfast as a means of transportation and over 200 plied up and down the Shankill Road every day. As a result, Nesbitt ordered that all the taxis in the Shankill were to be taken in and forensically tested, including a black taxi belonging to one of the gang, William Moore, a former meat packer. However, as the vehicle had been thoroughly cleaned, no evidence remained to incriminate Moore in the attacks. Moore subsequently destroyed his taxi.

=== Lenny Murphy ===
Nesbitt did not know at the time that William Moore was part of the murderous gang led by Brookmount Street resident Lenny Murphy, who commanded a UVF platoon that operated mainly from the "Brown Bear" pub, located on the corner of Mountjoy Street and the Shankill Road, not far from the Tennent Street station. Murphy had a pathological hatred of Catholics, and as a means of manifesting this hatred on the Catholic community at large, had formed a murder gang with like-minded friends from his "Brown Bear" platoon. The gang's modus operandi involved the abduction of innocent men walking home at night from areas that were overwhelmingly Catholic due to the sectarian geography of Belfast. Once the victims were hit over the head with a wheel brace and dragged into Moore's taxi, they were driven away to be subjected to a beating and torture session that ended with their being dumped, usually into a Shankill alleyway, where their throats were then sliced with butcher's knives. On the night Francis Rice was killed, Murphy had brought along two female acquaintances to observe the beating and murder. In addition to the cut-throat killings, Murphy and the Shankill Butchers also carried out sectarian shootings of random Catholics and punishment killings against their loyalist rivals, the most notable being that of Noel "Nogi" Shaw on 30 November 1975 as part of an internal UVF feud. Inside the "Lawnbrook Social Club", in full view of his unit, Murphy savagely beat, pistol-whipped and then repeatedly shot Shaw in the head; afterwards he ordered his body to be placed in a laundry basket. Shaw was a part of the UVF "Windsor Bar" platoon which was commanded by Anthony "Chuck" Berry and its members were rivals of the "Brown Bear" gang controlled by Murphy. The two pubs were a quarter of a mile apart from one another. Police from Nesbitt's C Division found Shaw's body in a back street off the Shankill several hours after he'd been killed.

After the examination of the Shankill taxis failed to obtain results, Nesbitt called in all the informers C Division used in West Belfast and even arrested a senior UVF member on false pretexts to offer him a deal in exchange for information; but nobody was able to tell him anything about the perpetrators. He then launched a potentially risky plan to entrap the killers which he codenamed "Operation Knife Edge". The plan involved putting plainclothes RUC men on the streets at night and having them behave as if they were drunk in the hope of luring the murderers. Although the policemen were placed in streets where the "Butchers" usually abducted their victims and were closely observed by detectives in nearby cars, the "Butchers" gang never approached them.

Despite Murphy being taken into police custody after attempting to kill two Catholic women in a drive-by shooting in March 1976, the killings continued with Murphy issuing orders to the other gang members on their visits to Crumlin Road Prison. He would later (11 October 1977) be sentenced to 12 years' imprisonment at the Maze on a firearms charge. On 1 August 1976 Cornelius Neeson (49) was fatally stabbed to death; on 30 October Queens University student Stephen McCann (20) fell victim to the gang and in February and March 1977 two more Catholic men (Joseph Morrissey and Francis Cassidy) were slain. As Moore had earlier been ordered by Murphy to dispose of his black taxi, he subsequently bought a yellow Ford Cortina which was used in lieu of the taxi to abduct the victims.

=== Breakthrough ===
Nesbitt finally received his first breakthrough in cracking the case when their last victim, Gerard McLaverty survived a "Butchers" attack. On 10 May 1977, he was abducted and taken to a disused doctor's surgery on the corner of Emerson Street and the Shankill. Once inside, he was subjected to a vicious beating, and was stabbed, partially strangled and had his wrists cut. Although his assailants dumped him in an alleyway – believing him to be dead – he had in fact survived and Nesbitt was notified of this crime which bore all of the hallmarks of the Shankill Butchers, save for the remarkable fact that he was left alive. At first sceptical of this new attack being the work of the "Butchers", upon being apprised of the details he became convinced that McLaverty was indeed a victim of the gang. He then quickly came up with a plan that would lead to the capture and subsequent imprisonment of most of the "Butchers" gang members.

He instructed police to drive a well-disguised McLaverty around the Shankill in an unmarked car in the hope that he would be able to recognise some of his assailants outside some of the pubs and drinking clubs the loyalist paramilitaries were known to frequent. This took place on 19 May, the day of local government elections which meant the Shankill Road was even more crowded than usual. Nesbitt's plan bore fruit when McLaverty identified Sam McAllister and Benjamin Edwards as his attackers. The former was easily spotted by McLaverty as he stood in a small group of men outside the "Berlin Arms", a popular UVF haunt in the Middle Shankill Road, due to his girth. McLaverty upon recognising McAllister had shouted out to the detectives in the car: "See that big fat fucker in the middle? That's one of them". A search of McAllister's home by police uncovered the knives used in the "Butchers"' killings which had been hidden under his bed beneath the floorboards. Under Nesbitt's intense questioning, the two arrested men broke down and confessed, providing more names leading to the arrest of Moore, Robert "Basher" Bates" and seven others. They were all charged and sentenced to life imprisonment.

Although Murphy was named as the gang's ringleader by Moore who also added those of two others (Murphy's lieutenants, "Mr. A" and "Mr. B"), the names were later retracted out of fear of retribution from the UVF Brigade Staff. Moore had actually confessed to Nesbitt in regards to the cut-throat killings that "Murphy done the first three and I done the rest". However, as Moore had retracted his statement, there wasn't sufficient corroborative or forensic evidence for the state prosecution to charge Murphy (named in court as the "Master Butcher"), "Mr. A", or "Mr. B" with the murders. Lenny Murphy was already well known to Nesbitt as having been one of the hardest members within the UVF, as he had interviewed him a number of times on previous occasions. Following the trial which was held in February 1979, William Moore's mother personally thanked Nesbitt for taking her son off the streets and putting him into jail. Nesbitt later ruefully commented that "the big fish got away" which was a reference to Murphy and Messrs "A" and "B". He later visited Moore in prison in a futile attempt to persuade him to name those who had escaped being charged with the murders.

Years later when Nesbitt was asked by journalist Peter Taylor how much the UVF Brigade Staff had actually known about the Shankill Butchers, he replied that their actions were not punished by the Brigade Staff because its members were afraid of them.

== The Committee investigation ==
In 1991, after Channel 4 broadcast a documentary claiming that the Ulster Loyalist Central Co-ordinating Committee had been reorganised as an alliance between loyalist paramilitaries, senior RUC members and leader figures in Northern Irish business and finance, Nesbitt and Detective Inspector Chris Webster were appointed by Chief Constable Hugh Annesley to head up an internal inquiry into the collusion allegations.

The investigation delivered its verdict in February 1993 and exonerated all those named as Committee members who did not have previous terrorist convictions arguing that they were "respectable members of the community" and in some cases "the aristocracy of the country". He added further that all bar one of the RUC officers named in the programme as having been involved in Committee's "Inner Force" did not actually exist and exonerated the sole real officer, Trevor Forbes. The report claimed that the show had been a hoax perpetrated by a disreputable, unnamed witness, and Nesbitt added that this witness had been active since 1985 when he sold false information about the Inner Force to Martin O'Hagan, who subsequently published it in the Sunday World.

McPhilemy denied the veracity of Nesbitt's argument and published a book in 1998 in which he discussed the investigation and also offered further evidence for the existence of the Committee and the Inner Force. McPhilemy argued Nesbitt's investigations had been perfunctory at best, failing for instance to uncover the fact that Jim Sands, the Ulster Independence Committee member who was the chief source for the documentary, was not unknown to one of the Committee's alleged two leading hit-men Billy Wright as Nesbitt had claimed but that rather the two had known each other since school. McPhilemy added that Sands, who had been questioned at some length during the Nesbitt Inquiries, had effectively been coached by the RUC as part of a whitewash. The book also reproduced the full transcript of a conversation between Sunday Express journalist Barrie Penrose and Nesbitt, in which Penrose made it clear that he was opposed to the initial programme whether it was true or not. Amongst the controversial statements made, Nesbitt was quoted as telling Penrose that he was aware of a UVF internal inquiry into the show which, he told Penrose, had pointed the finger at UVF Mid-Ulster Brigade members Jackie Whitten and Graham Long as possible sources for the documentary makers.

== Awards and later years ==
Prior to his retirement, Nesbitt had received a total of 67 commendations, which is the highest number ever given to a policeman in the history of the United Kingdom. In 1980, he was awarded the MBE "in recognition of his courage and success in combating terrorism".

When he was asked by journalist Bobbie Hanvey his own opinion on how criminals were able to live with themselves after committing their crimes, his response was that he'd once interviewed a murderer who had killed more than once and admitted to him that, "he had been advised by a leading UVF man from Mid-Ulster that the best thing to do was to keep on committing murders. This way, you would forget them because you always remember your first victim and if you kept killing they would all eventually disappear – become jumbled up and none would stand out in your mind".

He was the subject of a series of interviews by Stephen Nolan in his 2011 televised documentary on the Shankill Butchers. Nolan posed tough questions to Nesbitt as to why it had taken the RUC so long to catch the killers and whether or not the UVF leadership had knowledge of the Butchers' identity. Nesbitt defended his actions by pointing out he had put "every effort" into catching the culprits but that Lenny Murphy was a cunning and sadistic psychopath who "operated a tight circle" leaving no evidence behind after his brutal, sectarian killings. Murphy was already dead at the time of the interview having been fatally shot by the Provisional IRA on 16 November 1982.

Nesbitt died on 27 August 2014 after a brief illness.

In his book The Shankill Butchers: the real story of cold-booded mass murder, Martin Dillon summed Nesbitt up as "undoubtedly the most professional detective in Northern Ireland". Journalist Chris Ryder described Nesbitt as "one of the most experienced and painstaking of the RUC's detectives".

== Bibliography ==
- Dillon, Martin (1989). The Shankill Butchers: the real story of cold-blooded mass murder. New York: Routledge. ISBN 0-415-92231-3.
- McPhilemy, Sean (1999). The Committee: Political Assassination in Northern Ireland. Boulder, Colorado: Roberts Rinehart. ISBN 9781570982736.
- Ryder, Chris (1990). The RUC: A Force Under Fire. Mandarin.
- Taylor, Peter (1999). Loyalists. London: Bloomsbury Publishing Plc. ISBN 0-7475-4519-7.
