= William Moore (loyalist) =

Northern Irish gangster

- William Moore
- Born: 1949; Belfast, Northern Ireland
- Died: 17 May 2009 (aged 60); Belfast, Northern Ireland
- Other name: Billy Moore
- Occupation: Meat packer
- Known for: Member of the Shankill Butchers gang

William Moore (1949 – 17 May 2009) was a Northern Irish loyalist. He was a member of the Shankill Butchers, an Ulster Volunteer Force (UVF) gang. It was Moore who provided the black taxi and butcher knives which the gang used to carry out its killings. Following ringleader Lenny Murphy's arrest, Moore took over as the de facto leader of the gang and the killings continued.

== Shankill Butchers ==
Moore was born in Belfast, Northern Ireland and brought up a Protestant in the staunchly Ulster loyalist Shankill Road. Moore, who had a few previous convictions for petty crime, worked as a meat packer at Woodvale Meats on the Shankill. When he quit his job, he took with him an assortment of butcher's knives and a meat cleaver. He then became a taxi driver, having bought a black taxi which he drove around the Shankill area. In 1975, Moore met Lenny Murphy in the Brown Bear pub on the Shankill Road. Murphy, who was assembling the gang that become known as the Shankill Butchers, recruited Moore into the Ulster Volunteer Force (UVF). Their first action, which did not involve the knife-wielding violence that was to become their hallmark, occurred on 2 October 1975 when Moore and Murphy, along with two unidentified UVF members, robbed a Catholic-owned off-licence. Despite having been ordered just to rob the off-licence, the gang killed four Catholic employees in the process, two women and two 18-year-olds. Moore and Murphy escaped and, although the other two members were arrested, they did not name Moore or Murphy as having been involved.

Beginning in November 1975, the gang started abducting and murdering Roman Catholics, apparently in retaliation for the killing of four British soldiers by the Provisional IRA that same month. Moore was ordered by Murphy to drive around Catholic areas of Belfast in his taxi with the other gang members looking for prospective victims. Murphy and the other Butchers would bundle victims into the back of the taxi, then beat and torture them, before Murphy would finally drag them out into an alley and cut their throats with the weapons supplied by Moore. Journalist Peter Taylor spoke to a UVF member who explained that the Shankill Butchers had opted to use knives rather than guns because had they been caught with the latter the prison sentence received would be much longer.

The following year, on 13 March 1976, Murphy was arrested and subsequently convicted of a firearms offence, and to divert suspicion from himself he ordered the "Butcher" slayings to continue. They did so, with Moore now acting as the de facto leader. Moore personally slit the throat of a young Catholic student from ear-to-ear and kicked another man to death. He also encouraged the others to torture the victims before killing them. The gang also killed several rival loyalist paramilitaries as a result of petty feuds, in addition to planting a bomb in a Catholic neighbourhood during a Provisional IRA parade. The bomb killed a 10-year-old boy, and wounded over 100 people.

=== Conviction and imprisonment ===
In 1977, after a victim, Gerard McLaverty escaped alive, the Royal Ulster Constabulary (RUC) drove him around the Shankill Road area and he was able to identify two of his captors: Sam McAllister and Benjamin Edwards. The Shankill Butchers gang, including Moore, was subsequently rounded up by RUC Detective Inspector Jimmy Nesbitt from "C" Division and his team of CID detectives who were investigating the murders from Tennent Street RUC station. McLaverty had also told police that the car into which he had been abducted was a yellow Ford Cortina, a vehicle they knew from their surveillance that Moore drove. Moore and the rest of the members broke down and confessed to the killings, although they were too terrified to name Lenny Murphy as the ringleader. However, during one police interview, Moore sought to put the blame solely on Murphy. "It was that bastard Murphy who led me into all this. My head's away with it". After a lengthy period spent in jail on remand, Moore and the others stood trial in February 1979 at the Belfast Crown Court. Moore pleaded guilty to the most murders – a total of eleven – and was convicted of these, plus a further eight murders. On 20 February he was sentenced to life imprisonment inside the Maze Prison with the trial judge, Lord Justice O'Donnell, recommending that he and co-accused Robert Bates never be released. Judge O'Donnell addressed Moore with the following statements, "You pleaded guilty to 11 murders carried out in a manner so cruel and revolting as to be beyond the comprehension of any normal human being. I am convinced that without you many of the murders would have not have been committed". When being led from the court, Moore waved and smiled at the spectators in the public gallery.

Journalist Martin Dillon, author of the book The Shankill Butchers: the real story of cold-blooded mass murder, described Moore as having been "the quiet man" inside the Shankill Butchers gang. However, behind his unassuming manner lurked a "cold, vicious bigot". Even after Moore's arrest, his mother had personally thanked Inspector Jimmy Nesbitt for taking her son off the streets and putting him in jail. According to Dillon, Moore was content to take orders from Murphy and revelled in the attention and adulation which came his way from Murphy and the other gang members through his having provided the taxi and knives used in the attacks.

Moore was released from the Maze in 1998 under the terms of the Good Friday Agreement after having served 19 years. It was alleged that Moore became involved in loyalist drug deals, including a visit to a notorious Edinburgh gang.

== Death ==
Moore died in his home in the loyalist Mount Vernon area of north Belfast on 17 May 2009 as the result of a suspected heart attack; his dog was at his side. He was buried at Carnmoney Cemetery where Lenny Murphy also lies. Murphy had been gunned down by the IRA in November 1982 four months after his release from prison. Moore's grave is not far from that of one of his victims, Stephen McCann, a student whose throat he had personally cut. A press photographer covering his funeral on 21 May 2009 was attacked and beaten by a group of men, and received hospital treatment.

At the time of his death, Moore was due to be questioned by the Historical Enquiries Team (HET) over his role in the 1974 killing of a 52-year-old Catholic man, John Crawford of Andersonstown, who had been abducted then beaten and shot dead by a UVF gang in the vicinity of Milltown Cemetery.

== Sources ==
- Dillon, Martin (1989). The Shankill Butchers: the real story of cold-blooded mass murder. New York: Routledge. ISBN 0-415-92231-3
- Taylor, Peter (1999). Loyalists. London: Bloomsbury Publishing Plc. ISBN 0-7475-4519-7
