= Basher =

Basher may refer to:

== People ==
- Basher (nickname)
- Basher (surname)
- A person who participates in pejorative bashing

== Arts and entertainment ==
- Basher Tarr, a character in the 2001 film Ocean's Eleven, portrayed by Don Cheadle
- Basheer Hassib, fictional ISIS terrorist in the 2019 Indian film War
- A skill in the video game Lemmings
- An instrumental track from the album Closer to the Sun by Slightly Stoopid

== Other ==
- Basher, Missouri, a community in the United States
- Basher Kill, a tributary stream to the Neversink River in the U.S. state of New York
- A type of hat also known as a boater
- A term with multiple meanings for railfans

== See also ==
- Bashir (disambiguation)
- Bashert, the Yiddish word for destiny
