= Bishara =

Bishara, Beshero, Bechara or Beshara (بشارة) is a common Arabic and Coptic name in the Middle East. It is most common in Lebanon, Egypt, Iraq and Syria. In Arabic, Bishāra means “Good News” an Arabic word which is the equivalent to Greek εὐαγγέλιον euangélion, meaning “The Gospel”. As such, bearers of this surname are predominantly Christian.

It is also a Swahili and Borana name, as it means "Happy tidings". The spelling "Bechara" is more common in South America and Southern Italy. Bishara in its various forms may refer to:

== Mononym ==
- Bishara (singer) (born 2003), Swedish singer of Syrian origin
- Bechara Effendi, real name Manouk Avedissian (1841–1925), Ottoman administrator and the chief engineer of the Vilayet of Syria and later of the Vilayet of Beirut

== Given name ==
=== Bishara ===
- Bishara Merhej (born 1946), Lebanese journalist and politician
- Bishara Wakim (1890–1949), Egyptian film director and actor

=== Bechara ===
- Béchara Abou Mrad, Melkite priest and monk
- Bechara Choucair, Lebanese American administrator in medical fields and public health
- Beshara Doumani (born 1957), American historian and political writer
- Bechara El Khoury (1890–1964), President of Lebanon
- Bechara El Khoury (composer) (born 1957), Lebanese composer
- Bechara Oliveira (born 1976), Brazilian footballer
- Bechara Boutros al-Rahi (born 1940), 77th Maronite Patriarch of Antioch, and head of the Maronite Church since 2011

== Middle name ==
- Sirhan Sirhan (Sirhan Bishara Sirhan) (born 1944), Palestinian assassin of Robert Kennedy

== Surname ==
=== Bishara ===
- Abdullah Bishara (born 1936), Kuwaiti diplomat and politician
- Amal Bishara, Israeli Arab doctor
- Azmi Bishara (born 1956), Israeli Arab author and politician
- Joseph Bishara (born 1970), American composer, music producer and actor
- Marwan Bishara, Arab Israeli journalist
- Roberto Bishara (born 1981), former Chilean footballer of Palestinian descent
- Samir Bishara (1935–2010), Egyptian orthodontist
- Shoukry Bishara (born 1948), Palestinian economist and politician

=== Bechara ===
- Evanildo Bechara (1928–2025), Brazilian grammarian and philologist
- Flavia Bechara, Lebanese actress
- Hassan Bechara (1945–2017), Lebanese wrestler
- Souha Bechara (born 1967), Lebanese national. Unsuccessfully attempted to assassinate General Antoine Lahad of the South Lebanon Army

=== Beshara ===
- Brian Beshara (born 1977), Lebanese basketball player
- Khairy Beshara (born 1947), Egyptian film director

=== Fictional characters ===
- Mahmoud Bishara, fictional character in the book Refugee

== Others ==
- Beshara (band), British reggae band
- Ek Bechara, 1972 Bollywood action drama film
- Mr. Bechara, 1996 Bollywood romantic drama film directed by K. Bhagyaraj
- "Bishara", a song from the Tom Skinner album Voices of Bishara

== See also ==
- Bashir / Basheer / Bachir
