= James Watt (loyalist) =

- Born: 21 September 1952 (age 73); Belfast, Northern Ireland
- Other names: Tonto; Jim
- Occupations: fitter preacher
- Known for: bomb maker in the Ulster Volunteer Force (UVF)

James Watt also known as Tonto (born 21 September 1952) is a former Northern Irish loyalist who was the top bomb maker for the Ulster Volunteer Force (UVF) in the mid-1970s. In 1978, Watt was convicted and given nine separate life sentences for murder and attempted murder. These included bombings which killed a ten-year-old boy and two teenagers in two attacks carried out in April 1977 as a part of a UVF bombing campaign against republicans.

Following his release from prison in 1989 he left the organisation and in 1995 became a preacher having embraced Born-again Christianity while serving his sentence.

== Ulster Volunteer Force ==
Watt was born in Belfast, Northern Ireland on 21 September 1952 and grew up in a Protestant family in Benview Park off the loyalist Ballysillan Road in North Belfast. His father worked as a park ranger at the Bone Hill playing fields. Employed as a fitter having left school to earn his apprenticeship in the trade, Watt joined the loyalist paramilitary organisation, the Ulster Volunteer Force (UVF) in 1973 because, in his words, "the IRA were blowing up my city". He later told police that it had been "the right thing to do"; His role in the UVF Belfast Brigade was that of a bomb maker; his skills in that field ensured that by 1976 he was much in demand for operations that required the use of explosives. The UVF and the other loyalist paramilitary organisations lacked the expertise as regards bombmaking and therefore lagged considerably behind the IRA; nevertheless Watt achieved a reputation within the ranks as the UVF's top bomb maker.

He was better known by his nickname "Tonto" taken from the Lone Ranger's American Indian companion.

=== Notable bombing attacks ===
In April 1977 he was recruited by members of the Shankill Butchers gang who beginning in late 1975 had carried out a series of cut-throat killings against Catholic civilians operating out of the Brown Bear pub on the Shankill Road. Although their leader Lenny Murphy was imprisoned by this time, the group continued to perpetrate killings acting under Murphy's instructions which he issued during prison visits by his close associates known as Messrs "A" and "B". The Butchers gang were part of the UVF Brown Bear platoon, however their murderous activities were not authorised by the UVF Brigade Staff (Belfast leadership). Departing from their usual modus operandi Messrs "A" and "B" wished to attack a large number of Republicans directly in their Falls Road stronghold by planting a bomb during the traditional Republican Easter Rising commemoration parade. For this they needed the sanction of the Brigade Staff who gave it only on the condition that the bomb would only take out members of the IRA. The Butchers also required the services of Watt to assemble the bomb. Before his arrest and imprisonment, Murphy had refused to use Watt preferring to act independent of the Brigade Staff.

After a reconnaissance of the Falls Road area with Norman Waugh, Benjamin Edwards and two other Butchers' gang members specifically chosen to plant the device, Watt decided that a security barrier composed of cement-filled beer kegs outside a bakery on Beechmount Avenue in the Lower Falls area would be the ideal spot for hiding the bomb. He constructed the five-pound bomb with sticks of gelignite inside a beer keg which was then transported by the gang to Beechmount Avenue at 3.00 am on Easter Sunday 10 April. The bomb was placed with the other beer kegs that made up the security barrier.

The bomb primed by Watt beforehand and planted by the Shankill Butchers exploded shortly the following afternoon at 2.47 pm just as the Official Sinn Féin Commemoration parade began. The explosion killed one boy, Kevin McMenamin (10) and injured five people, one of whom had a leg blown off.

Ten days later another UVF bomb assembled by Watt was planted to go off beside the funeral cortege of IRA man Trevor McKibbin in Etna Drive, Ardoyne. Two teenaged Catholic boys Sean Campbell (19) and Sean McBride (18) were killed in the no-warning explosion. They were both civilians. The blast was so powerful that its force left one of the victims decapitated. It later emerged that before the Troubles broke out in 1969, Watt had played football with Campbell's older brothers at the Bone Hill playing fields.

The following month the UVF again used Watt's expertise to make a bomb which detonated in Crumlin Road outside Mountainview petrol station. The attack was to punish the station's owner, who had defied a joint UVF and Ulster Defence Association (UDA) order to close during the 1977 Ulster Workers Strike. John Geddis, an off-duty Ulster Defence Regiment (UDR) Corporal was killed as he drove past.

== Imprisonment and release ==
Watt was arrested and questioned by the Royal Ulster Constabulary (RUC); The investigation team was headed by CID detective Alan Simpson. Watt admitted his guilt to a number of killings and at his trial held at Belfast Crown Court in September 1978, he received nine separate life sentences for murder and attempted murder. He did not however receive a recommended sentence as his lawyers had asked that each murder be presented before the court in individual hearings resulting in nine separate sentences.

During his time in prison he studied with the Open University eventually obtaining a first class degree in maths. He remarked that, "The OU made learning enjoyable".

He was released in 1989. In 1995 he became a preacher after having embraced Born-again Christianity whilst serving his sentence.

In 2007, the sister of Sean Campbell expressed a wish to meet Watt.

Psychologist Geoffrey Beattie, who as a youth had been in a local gang with Watt, was interviewed by radio and television personality Stephen Nolan for his 2011 televised documentary on the Shankill Butchers. Beattie suggested that Watt had not been a particularly vicious person, adding that he had known young men who were far more vicious and "much harder" than Watt.

The documentary erroneously claimed Watt was an integral part of the Shankill Butchers gang.
