= John Murphy (loyalist) =

Northern Irish paramilitary member (1950–1998)

John Alexander Thompson Murphy (26 August 1950 – 10 August 1998) was a Northern Irish loyalist. He was one of the three leading men in the "Shankill Butchers", an Ulster Volunteer Force (UVF) gang.

== Early life ==
Murphy was the second of three sons born to William and Joyce Murphy, the others being William (eldest) and Lenny Murphy (youngest). Outside his paramilitary career, little is known about him, although Martin Dillon, author of a book on the "Shankill Butchers", wrote that John and William acted as muscle for their younger brother when the latter was engaged in petty crime at school.

== Paramilitary activity ==
According to Dillon, John Murphy was party to the murder of rival loyalist Noel "Nogi" Shaw on 30 November 1975. After being shot in a loyalist drinking-den, Shaw's body was thrown into a laundry basket and dumped in an alleyway. He played an important role in passing orders to the "Butchers" from his brother Lenny, after the latter's imprisonment in March 1976.

Other than being convicted, along with several of the "Butchers", with an assault on a man which occurred on 11 April 1977, John Murphy was never charged with involvement in the activities of the Butchers.

== Later life ==
After Lenny's assassination, his elder brothers returned to domestic life in the Shankill. Martin Dillon wrote that the two brothers were overheard discussing the possibility of killing him (Dillon) for what he wrote about them in his book, The Shankill Butchers: a case study of mass murder. In 1998, Murphy's nephew William, son of his brother William, was arrested and remanded in prison for the murder of a 78-year-old in the Shankill Road area. His nephew was convicted of murder in January 1999 and received a life sentence. A suspended sentence was imposed on William Murphy (the elder) for possession of ammunition uncovered during a search of the family home in Battenberg Street.

== Death ==
John Murphy died on 10 August 1998 in a car crash at the junction of the Grosvenor Road and the Westlink in Belfast.

== Sources ==
- Dillon, Martin The Shankill Butchers: a case study of mass murder (First and second editions, Arrow Books, London, 1990; Routledge, London, 1999).
- Jordan, Hugh Milestones in Murder. Defining moments in Ulster's terrorist war (Mainstream Publishing, Edinburgh and London, 2002)
- Taylor, Peter Loyalists (Bloomsbury, London, 1999)
