= Bisharat =

Bisharat may refer to:

- The Tablets of Bahá'u'lláh Bishárát, part of the scriptures of the Baháʼí Faith
- Charlie Bisharat, professional studio and concert violinist
- Emily Bisharat (died 2004), Jordanian lawyer, activist and philanthropist

== See also ==
- Bishara, a name
- Bisharatganj, a town in Uttar Pradesh, India
