= Basher (surname) =

As a surname, Basher may refer to:

- Adil Basher (1926–1978), Iraqi football player and coach
- Aleem Said Ahmad Basher (1951–2024), Filipino-Muslim Alim, Islamic preacher, broadcaster and lecturer
- Emma Basher (born 1992), Australia rower
- Simon Basher, an English artist, illustrator and author based in Amsterdam

== See also ==
- Basher (disambiguation)
- Basher (nickname)
