= Robert Bates (loyalist) =

Northern Irish loyalist

- Robert "Basher" Bates
- Born: Robert William Bates; 12 December 1948; Belfast, Northern Ireland
- Died: 11 June 1997 (aged 48); Belfast, Northern Ireland
- Cause of death: Revenge murder by shooting
- Other name: "Basher"

Robert William Bates (12 December 1948 – 11 June 1997) was a Northern Irish loyalist. He was a member of the Ulster Volunteer Force and the infamous Shankill Butchers gang, led by Lenny Murphy.

== Shankill Butchers ==
Bates was born into an Ulster Protestant family and grew up in the Shankill Road area of Belfast. He had a criminal record dating back to 1966, and later became a member of the Ulster loyalist paramilitary organisation, the Ulster Volunteer Force (UVF). Bates, employed as a barman at the Long Bar, was recruited into the Shankill Butchers gang in 1975 by its notorious ringleader, Lenny Murphy.

The gang used The Brown Bear pub, a Shankill Road drinking haunt frequented by the UVF, as its headquarters. Bates, a "sergeant" in the gang's hierarchy, was an avid participant in the brutal torture and savage killings perpetrated against innocent Catholics after they were abducted from nationalist streets and driven away in a black taxi owned by fellow Shankill Butcher, William Moore.

The killings typically involved grisly-throat slashings preceded by lengthy beatings and torture. Bates was said to have been personally responsible for beating James Moorhead, a member of the Ulster Defence Association, to death on 30 January 1977 and to have played a central role in the kidnapping and murder of Catholic Joseph Morrisey three days later. He also killed Thomas Quinn, a derelict, on 8 February 1976 and the following day was involved in shooting dead Archibald Hanna and Raymond Carlisle, two Protestant workmen that Bates and Murphy mistook for Catholics.

Martin Dillon revealed that Bates was also one of the four UVF gunmen who carried out a mass shooting in the Chlorane Bar attack in Belfast city centre on 5 June 1976. Five people (three Catholics and two Protestants) were shot dead. The UVF unit had burst into the pub in Gresham Street and ordered the Catholics and Protestants to line up on opposite ends of the bar before they opened fire. He later recounted his role in the attack to police; however, he had claimed that he never fired any shots due to his revolver having malfunctioned. Forensics evidence contradicted him as it proved that his revolver had been fired inside the Chlorane Bar that night. Lenny Murphy was in police custody at the time the shooting attack against the Chlorane Bar took place.

Bates was arrested in 1977, along with Moore and other "Shankill Butcher" accomplices. His arrest followed a sustained attack by Moore and Sam McAllister on Catholic Gerard McLaverty, after which they dumped his body, presuming him dead. However McLaverty survived and identified Moore and McAllister to the Royal Ulster Constabulary who drove him up and down the Shankill Road during a loyalist parade until he saw his attackers. During questioning both men implicated Bates, and other gang members, leading to their arrests. Following a long period spent on remand, he was convicted in February 1979 of murder related to the Shankill Butcher killings and given ten life sentences, with a recommendation by the trial judge, Mr Justice O'Donnell, that he should never be released.

== In prison ==
At the start of his sentence, Bates was involved in a series of violent incidents involving other inmates. Bates later claimed that he had perpetrated these acts in order to live up to his "Basher" nickname. He served as company commander of the UVF inmates and became noted as a stern disciplinarian.

However while in the Maze Prison, he was said to have "found God", and as a result became a born-again Christian. He produced a prison testimony, which was later reprinted in The Burning Bush, and, after publicly advocating an end to violence, was transferred to HMP Maghaberry.

In prison, Bates formed a friendship with Provisional IRA member and fellow detainee Brendan Hughes. Bates foiled a UVF assassination plot on Hughes.

It has been alleged that his image appears on the cover of Searching for the Young Soul Rebels by Dexy's Midnight Runners.

== Early release and death ==
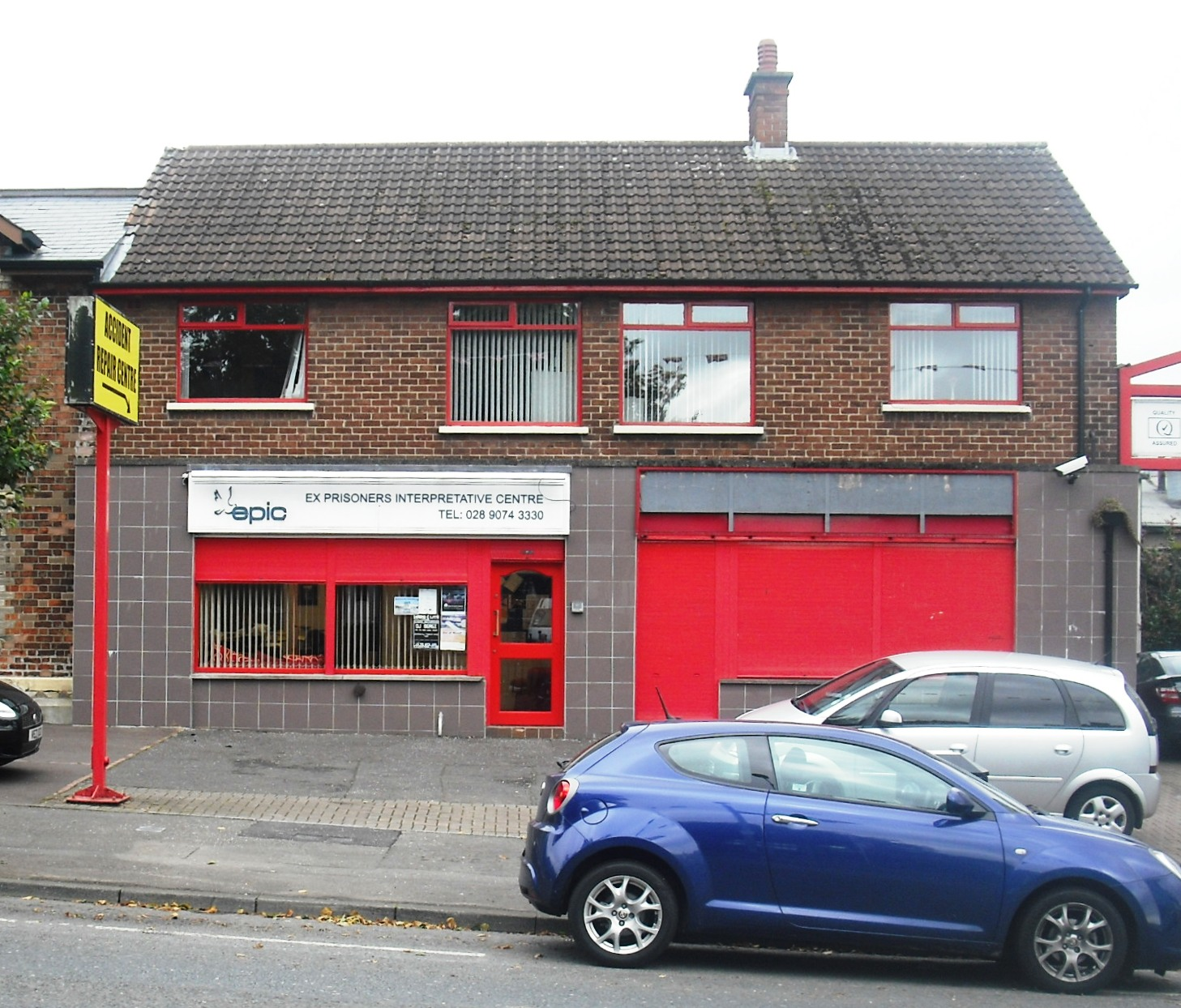
Ex-Prisoners Interpretative Centre, Woodvale Road, where Bates worked after his release and where he was shot

In October 1996, 18 months prior to the signing of the Good Friday Agreement, Bates was cleared for early release by the Life Sentence Review Board. He was given the opportunity of participating in a rehabilitation scheme, spending the day on a work placement and returning to prison at night. As he arrived for work in his native Shankill area of Belfast early on the morning of 11 June 1997, Bates was shot dead by the son of a UDA man named James Curtis Moorehead, who Bates had killed in 1977. The killer identified himself to Bates as the son of his victim before opening fire. The Sutton Index of Deaths attributes his assassination to a feud between the UVF and the UDA. Bates had been working at the Ex-Prisoners Interpretative Centre (EPIC), a drop-in centre for former loyalist prisoners.

While Bates's killing had not been sanctioned by the UDA leadership, they rejected UVF demands that the killer should be handed over to them, instead exiling him from the Shankill. He was rehoused in the Taughmonagh area where he quickly became an important figure in the local UDA as a part of Jackie McDonald's South Belfast Brigade.

Bates's name was subsequently included on the banner of a prominent Orange Lodge on the Shankill Road, called Old Boyne Island Heroes. Relatives of Shankill butchers victims Cornelius Neeson condemned the banner, stating that "it hurts the memory of those the butchers killed". A fellow Lodge member and former friend of Bates defended the inclusion of his name to journalist Peter Taylor: "I knew him very well and he'd been a personal friend for twenty or thirty years and to me he was a gentleman". He went on to describe him as having been "an easy-going, decent fellow, and as far as the Lodge is concerned, a man of good-standing".

He was buried in a Free Presbyterian Church of Ulster ceremony by Reverend Alan Smylie. Bates's funeral was attended by a large representation from local Orange Lodges. Peace activist Mairead Maguire was also amongst the mourners, arguing that Bates had "repented, asked for forgiveness and showed great remorse for what he had done", whilst a memorial service held at the spot of his killing two days after the funeral was attended by Father Gerry Reynolds of Clonard Monastery.

== Bibliography ==
- Cusack, Jim & McDonald, Henry (2008). UVF: Endgame. Dublin: Poolbeg. ISBN 978-184223-326-9
- Taylor, Peter (1999). Loyalists. London: Bloomsbury Publishing Plc. ISBN 0 7475 4519 7
