= Shankill Butchers =

Ulster loyalist gang

The Shankill Butchers were an Ulster loyalist paramilitary gang – many of whom were members of the Ulster Volunteer Force (UVF) – that was active between 1975 and 1982 in Belfast, Northern Ireland. It was based in the Shankill area and was responsible for the deaths of at least 23 people, most of whom were killed in sectarian attacks.

The gang kidnapped, tortured and murdered random civilians suspected of being Catholics; each was beaten ferociously and had their throat slashed with a butcher's knife. Some were also tortured and attacked with a hatchet. The gang also killed six Ulster Protestants over personal disputes and two other Protestants mistaken for Catholics.

Most of the gang were eventually caught and, in February 1979, received the longest combined prison sentences in United Kingdom legal history. However, gang leader Lenny Murphy and his two chief "lieutenants" escaped prosecution. Murphy was killed in November 1982 by the Provisional IRA, likely acting with the assistance of loyalist paramilitaries who perceived him as a threat. The Butchers brought a new level of paramilitary violence to a country already hardened by death and destruction. The judge who oversaw the 1979 trial described their crimes as "a lasting monument to blind sectarian bigotry".

== Timeline ==
=== Background ===
Much of what is known about the Butchers comes from Martin Dillon's The Shankill Butchers: A Case Study of Mass Murder (1989 and 1998). In compiling this detailed work, Dillon was reportedly given unlimited access to the case files of the Royal Ulster Constabulary (RUC), who eventually caught the gang. The commander of the Shankill Butchers was Lenny Murphy. Murphy was the youngest of three sons of Joyce (née Thompson) and William Murphy from the loyalist Shankill Road area of Belfast. At school, he was a known bully and would threaten other boys with a knife or with retribution from his two older brothers. Soon after leaving school at 16, he joined the UVF. Murphy often attended the trials of people accused of paramilitary crimes to become well acquainted with the laws of evidence and police procedure.

On 28 September 1972, Murphy (aged 20) shot and killed William Edward "Ted" Pavis (32) at his home in East Belfast. Pavis was a Protestant whom the UVF accused of selling weapons to the Provisional Irish Republican Army (PIRA). Murphy and an accomplice, Mervyn Connor, were arrested and held on remand in Belfast's Crumlin Road prison. After a visit by police to Connor, fellow inmates suspected that he might cut a deal with the authorities. On 22 April 1973, Connor died by ingesting a large dose of cyanide. Before he died, he wrote a confession to the Pavis murder, reportedly under duress from Murphy. Murphy was brought to trial for the Pavis murder in June 1973. The court heard evidence from two witnesses who had seen Murphy pull the trigger and had later picked him out of an identification parade. The jury acquitted him due in part to Murphy's disruption of the line-up. Murphy's freedom was short-lived as he was re-arrested immediately for a number of escape attempts and imprisoned, then interned, for three years.

=== Formation ===
In May 1975, Murphy was released from prison, where he had married Margaret Gillespie. During his imprisonment, a daughter had been born to the couple. He spent much of his time frequenting pubs on the Shankill Road, assembling a paramilitary team that would enable him to act with some freedom from the UVF leadership (Brigade Staff). Murphy's inner circle consisted of two people whom Dillon was unable to name for legal reasons but whom he called Murphy's "personal friends". These were a "Mr. A" and John Murphy, one of Lenny Murphy's brothers (referred to as "Mr. B"). Further down the chain of command were Lenny Murphy's "sergeants" William Moore and Bobby "Basher" Bates, a UVF member and former prisoner.

Moore, formerly a worker in a meat-processing factory, had stolen several large knives and meat-cleavers from his old workplace, tools that would later be used in more murders. Another prominent figure was Sam McAllister, who used his physical presence to intimidate others. On 2 October 1975, the gang raided a drinks premises in nearby Millfield. On finding that its four employees (two females and two males) were Catholics, Murphy shot three of them dead and ordered an accomplice to kill the fourth. By then, Murphy was using the upper floor of the Brown Bear pub at the corner of Mountjoy Street and the Shankill Road near his home as an occasional meeting-place for his unit.

=== Cut-throat killings ===
On 24–25 November 1975, using the city's sectarian geography to identify likely targets, Murphy roamed the areas nearest the Catholic New Lodge in the hope of finding someone likely to be Catholic to abduct. Francis Crossin (34), a Catholic man and father of two, was walking down Library Street towards the city centre at approximately 12:40 am when four of the Butchers, in Moore's taxi, spotted him. As the taxi pulled alongside Crossin, Murphy jumped out and hit him on the right side of the head with a wheel brace to disorient him. He was dragged into the taxi by Benjamin Edwards and Archie Waller, two of Murphy's gang. As the taxi returned to the safety of the nearby Shankill area, Crossin suffered a ferocious beating. He was subjected to a high level of violence, including a beer glass being shoved into his head. Murphy repeatedly told Crossin: "I'm going to kill you, you bastard", before the taxi stopped at an entry off Wimbledon Street. Crossin was dragged into an alleyway and Murphy, brandishing a butcher's knife, cut his throat almost through to the spine. The gang dispersed. Crossin, whose body was found the next morning by an elderly woman, was the first of three Catholics to be killed by Murphy in this "horrific and brutal manner". "Slaughter in back alley" was the headline in the city's major afternoon newspaper that day. A relative of Crossin said that his family was unable to have an open coffin at his wake because the body was so badly mutilated.

A few days later, on 30 November 1975, an internal feud led to the deaths of two members of a rival UVF company on the Shankill and to that of Archibald Waller, who had been involved in the Crossin murder. On 14 October of that year, Waller had killed Stewart Robinson in a punishment shooting gone wrong. With the sanction of the UVF Brigade Staff, he in turn was gunned down by one of Robinson's comrades in the UVF team based in the Windsor Bar, a quarter of a mile from the Brown Bear pub. Enraged, Murphy had the gunman, former loyalist prisoner Noel "Nogi" Shaw, brought before a kangaroo court in the Lawnbrook Club, one of his Shankill drinking dens. After pistol whipping Shaw, Murphy shot him in front of his whole unit of about twenty men and returned to finish his drink at the bar. John Murphy and William Moore put Shaw's body in a laundry basket, and Moore dumped it half a mile away.

Murphy's other cut-throat victims were Thomas Quinn (55) and Francis Rice (24). Both were abducted late at night, on the weekend, in the same area as Crossin. Quinn was murdered in the Glencairn district of the Upper Shankill in the early hours of 7 February 1976 and Rice a few streets from Murphy's home at about 1:30 am on 22 February 1976, after a butcher's knife had been collected from a loyalist club. Quinn's body was not found until mid-evening, after a phone call to a Belfast newspaper, while Rice's was found about six hours after his murder. Murphy's main accomplices on both occasions were Moore and Bates, while Edwards was party to the killing of Quinn. Another man and two women, whom Dillon did not name, were accessories to Murphy in the murder of Rice.

By this time the expression "the Butchers" had appeared in media coverage of these killings, and many Catholics lived in fear of the gang. Detective Chief Inspector Jimmy Nesbitt, head of the CID Murder Squad in Tennent Street RUC base and the man charged with tracking down the Butchers, was in no doubt that the murders of Crossin, Quinn and Rice were the work of the same people. Other than that he had little information, although a lead was provided by the woman who found Rice's body. The previous night she had heard voices in the entry where the body was later found, and what she thought might have been a local taxi (those in Belfast being ex-London type black cabs). This had led to William Moore's taxi being examined for evidence, as were all other Shankill taxis; however, the Butchers had cleaned the vehicle thoroughly and nothing incriminating was found. On Murphy's orders, Moore destroyed the taxi and bought a yellow Ford Cortina, which was to be used in subsequent murders.

Early on 11 March 1976, Murphy tried to kill a Catholic woman in a drive-by shooting; arrested later that day, he was put on remand on an attempted murder charge. Shortly after Murphy's arrest, he began to receive visits from "Mr. A" and "Mr. B". He told "Mr. A" that the cut-throat murders should continue in due course, partly to divert suspicion from himself. In a subsequent plea bargain, Murphy pleaded guilty to a firearms charge and was sentenced on 11 October 1977 to twelve years' imprisonment. Another Catholic man killed by the gang was Cornelius "Con" Neeson (49), attacked with a hatchet by Moore and McAllister on the Cliftonville Road late on 1 August 1976. He died a few hours later. One of Neeson's brothers, speaking in 1994, declared: "I saw the state of my brother's body after he was butchered on the street. I said, 'That is not my brother'. Even our mother would not have recognised him".

Later that year "Mr. A" informed Moore, now the Butchers' de facto commander, of Murphy's orders to resume the throat-slashings. Three more Catholic men from North Belfast were subsequently kidnapped, tortured and hacked to death in a similar manner as before. The victims were Stephen McCann (20), a Queen's University student and peace activist murdered on 30 October 1976; Joseph Morrissey (52), found murdered with "gruesome injuries" on 3 February 1977; and Francis Cassidy (43), a dock-worker from the New Lodge area whose body was found in Highfield with the throat slashed, hammer blows to the face and shot in the head on 30 March 1977. Moore proved himself an able deputy to Murphy, committing the throat-cuttings himself and encouraging the gang to use extreme violence on the victims beforehand. In particular, Arthur McClay attacked Morrissey with a hatchet; Moore had promoted McClay after Murphy had been jailed. The three victims were dumped in various parts of the greater Shankill area. The other gang members involved in one or more of these cut-throat murders were McAllister, John Townsley, David Bell and Norman Waugh. "Mr. A" played a prominent part in the planning of Moore's activities.

After his arrest in 1977, William Moore was portrayed in subsequent police accounts as having been in effective control of the Butchers gang during Murphy's incarceration. However, a 2017 book on the UVF, citing an unnamed source, argued that John, an older brother of Murphy who escaped prosecution, had been directing the activities of the Butchers during that time.

=== Capture and imprisonment ===
Late on Tuesday, 10 May 1977, Gerard McLaverty, a young Belfast man whose family had recently left the city, was walking down the Cliftonville Road. Two members of the Butchers approached him and, posing as policemen, forced him into a car where two of their comrades were seated. The gang, who had spent the day drinking, drove McLaverty to a disused doctor's surgery on the corner of Emerson Street and the Shankill Road where he was beaten with sticks. He was stabbed, had his wrists slashed a number of times by Moore and McAllister, using a smallish knife, and was dumped in a back entry. Uncharacteristically, he had been left for dead by the gang but survived until early morning, when a woman heard his cries for help and called the police. In compliance with previous orders, news of the assault was given to Inspector Nesbitt. At first he did not attribute particular significance to this message, as the Butchers had left no one alive before; but on discovering the nature of the assault and the use of a knife, he came up with an idea that was to permanently change the course of his inquiries.

Taking advantage of the aftermath of a loyalist paramilitary strike and local elections, Nesbitt had the recovered McLaverty disguised and driven by police around the Shankill area on Wednesday 18 May to see if he could spot the men who had abducted or attacked him. Within a short time he identified McAllister and Edwards, and Nesbitt had a breakthrough that enabled him to widen his net. The next morning he initiated a large arrest operation and many of McAllister's associates, including Moore, were taken into custody. At first under intense interrogation, the suspects admitted only to their involvement in the McLaverty abduction but Nesbitt, seizing on McAllister's references to the size of a knife used on McLaverty, had his team of detectives press the case, and eventually most of the gang admitted their part in the activities of the Butchers. Further arrests followed and the overall picture became clearer. The salient point emerging was that Murphy, the commander of the unit, was the driving force behind the cut-throat murders and other criminal activities. A number of the Butchers implicated him and his close associates "Mr. A" and "Mr. B" (John Murphy) in numerous paramilitary activities but later retracted these claims for fear of retribution from the UVF Brigade Staff. Lenny Murphy, in prison, and Messrs "A" and "B" were interviewed several times in connection with the Butchers' inquiry but revealed nothing during interviews. Without corroborative or forensic evidence, the state prosecution service decided that they would not face charges.

The rest of the Butchers came to trial during 1978 and early 1979. On 20 February 1979, eleven men were convicted of a total of 19 murders, and the 42 life sentences handed out were the most ever in a single trial in British criminal history. Moore pleaded guilty to 11 counts of murder and Bates to 10. The trial judge, Lord Justice O'Donnell, said that he did not wish to be cast as "public avenger" but felt obliged to sentence the two to life imprisonment with no chance of release. However, Bates was freed two years after the paramilitary ceasefires of 1994, and Moore released under the Good Friday Agreement of 1998. Martin Dillon's own investigations suggest that a number of other individuals (whom he was unable to name for legal reasons) escaped prosecution for participation in the crimes of the Butchers and that the gang were responsible for a total of at least 30 murders. In summing-up, O'Donnell LJ stated that their crimes, "a catalogue of horror", were "a lasting monument to blind sectarian bigotry". After the trial, Jimmy Nesbitt's comment was: "The big fish got away", a reference to Murphy (referred to in court as "Mr. X" or the "Master Butcher") and to Messrs "A" and "B". At this time McLaverty lived under police protection in Dublin, where he had been given a covername.

=== Murphy's release and death ===
His sentence for the firearms conviction complete, Murphy was released from prison on 16 July 1982. One day later, his killing spree resumed when he beat to death a local Protestant man with a learning disability in the Loyalist Club in Rumford Street. His body was dumped in a back alley over a mile away. Murphy began to assemble a new gang. On 29 August 1982, Murphy killed Jim Galway (33), a part-time Ulster Defence Regiment (UDR) soldier from the Lower Shankill area, who had been passing information to the UVF and was involved with its Ballymena units. When suspicions of being an informer fell upon Galway, Murphy decided to kill him. Galway was shot in the head at a building site in the village of Broughshane near Ballymena and buried on the spot. His decayed body was not found until November 1983. The location of the body was pointed out in 1983 by a person in custody for other charges. On 5 September 1982, Murphy killed a former UVF prisoner, Brian Smyth (30), in a dispute over money owed for a car. Murphy poisoned the man in a Shankill club before shooting him from the rear of a passing motorcycle as he sat in a car driven by Murphy's friend, and leading Red Hand Commando member, Sam "Mambo" Carroll. Early on Friday, 22 October 1982, UDR soldier Thomas Cochrane was kidnapped by the IRA. The next evening, although he had been warned by the UVF Brigade Staff against abducting anyone, Murphy decided to kidnap a Catholic, ostensibly to demand Cochrane's release in exchange for the Catholic hostage. He hijacked a black taxi, which one of his men drove to the Falls Road. Joseph Donegan, a middle-aged Catholic on his way home, hailed the vehicle and got in. Murphy immediately attacked the man as the taxi was driven back to the safety of the Shankill area. At a house owned by Murphy in Brookmount Street, Donegan was tortured sadistically by Murphy, who according to Dillon, pulled out all but three of his teeth with pliers. Murphy's associate, Tommy Stewart, battered Donegan to death with a shovel. "Mr. A" was party to these events. Murphy telephoned a prominent Catholic politician, Cormac Boomer, to demand that Cochrane be set free. Murphy ordered that Donegan's body be removed from his house, but the plan was disturbed by passers-by and the victim had to be dumped in an entry behind the house. After discovery of the body on the morning of Monday 25 October, Murphy and two others were arrested; but without evidence that Murphy had been party to this crime, it was not possible to charge him. Cochrane's body was found a week later.

Murphy was assassinated by a Provisional IRA hit squad early in the evening of Tuesday, 16 November 1982, outside the back of his girlfriend's house in the Glencairn estate (where four of the Butchers' cut-throat victims had been dumped). No sooner had he parked his car than two gunmen emerged from a van that had been following him and fired a hail of more than twenty bullets, killing him instantly. After several days' speculation as to those responsible for the shooting, the IRA issued a statement claiming responsibility for what it termed Murphy's "execution":

Lenny Murphy (master butcher) has been responsible for the horrific murders of over 20 innocent Nationalists in the Belfast area and a number of Protestants. The IRA has been aware for some time that since his release recently from prison, Murphy was attempting to re-establish a similar murder gang to that which he led in the mid-1970s and, in fact, he was responsible for a number of the recent sectarian murders in the Belfast area. The IRA takes this opportunity to restate its policy of non-sectarian attacks, while retaining its right to take unequivocal action against those who direct or motivate sectarian slaughter against the Nationalist population.

The location of the murder, in a loyalist stronghold, and the timing of the shooting to coincide with Murphy's movements suggested the IRA received help from UVF members who deemed Murphy "out of control" or, equally plausibly, that information had been given by an enemy of Murphy. Dillon suggests that Jim Craig, a leading Ulster Defence Association (UDA) commander whose protection rackets had made him rich and feared in equal measure, fitted the description. He was known to have clashed with Murphy on the latter's release from prison earlier that year and may have wanted him out of the picture. In support of this theory, Craig was later executed by his UDA colleagues for "treason", an inquiry having found some evidence of his part in the murder of other top loyalists by republicans.

Murphy's family denied he had had a violent nature or was involved with the Butchers: "My Lenny could not have killed a fly", said his mother Joyce. She accused the police of continual harassment of her son since his recent release from prison and said that he was planning to leave the country as soon as his divorce came through. The UVF gave Murphy a paramilitary funeral attended by thousands of loyalists and several unionist politicians, at which "Mr. A" and John Murphy played leading roles. On his gravestone in Carnmoney cemetery were inscribed the words: "Here Lies a Soldier". Baroness Blood, a Shankill Road community representative, said: "My father was a soldier. My father fought in two World Wars. They were real heroes. Lenny Murphy wasn't a hero; he was a murdering thug". Murphy's headstone was smashed in 1989 and had to be replaced.

== Other activities ==
Moore, Bates, and McAllister shot and wounded a member of the Windsor Bar UVF unit a few hours after the murder of Noel Shaw in November 1975. Murphy and Moore shot dead Edward McQuaid, a Catholic man, on the Cliftonville Road on 10 January 1976. On 9 February 1976, Murphy and three of his gang shot and killed two Protestant men, Archibald Hanna and Raymond Carlisle, wrongly believing that they were Catholics on their way to work across the Shankill. Bates was involved in a gun attack on a bar in Smithfield, not far from the Shankill, that killed several people, both Catholics and Protestants, on 5 June 1976. Other Protestants who met their deaths at the hands of the gang included two UDA men. The first was Thomas Easton, who made the mistake of becoming involved in an argument with McAllister, and was ambushed by McAllister at the end of the evening and killed with a breeze block to the head on 21 December 1976. McAllister's guilty plea to a manslaughter charge was accepted by the Crown. McAllister received a minor punishment shooting for the murder of Easton. The second was James Moorehead, a former police reservist, beaten to death by McAllister, Bates and Moore in the toilets of the Windsor Bar on 29 January 1977.

Members of the gang also carried out a bombing mission on the Falls Road that killed a 10-year-old Catholic boy on 10 April 1977. Murphy's brother John was heavily involved in the latter incident, along with "Mr. A". The gang used the services of the UVF's leading bomb expert James "Tonto" Watt to plant the device, although Watt was not a member of the Brown Bear platoon. Several of the Butchers, including John Murphy, were questioned about a serious assault in April 1977 in Union Street, near Belfast city centre, on a man they believed wrongly was a Catholic. John Murphy received three years' imprisonment for his part in this incident.

== Aftermath ==
Several sources indicate that Mid-Ulster UVF's brigade commander, Robin "The Jackal" Jackson from Donaghcloney contacted members of the gang in the Shankill, "Mr. A" in particular, and had them make an attempt on the life of journalist Jim Campbell, northern editor of the Sunday World newspaper, in May 1984. Campbell, whose investigations put the spotlight on Jackson's activities, was seriously wounded but survived.

All members of the Butchers gang have been released. The first to be freed was John Townsley, who had been only 14 when he became involved with the gang and 16 when arrested. In October 1996, Bates was released; he had reportedly "found religion" behind bars. Bates was shot and killed in the upper Shankill area on 11 June 1997 by the son of the UDA man he had killed in the Windsor Bar. "Mr. B", John Murphy, died in a car accident in Belfast in August 1998. In July 2000, Sam McAllister was injured in an attack during a loyalist feud.

William Moore was the final member of the gang to be released from prison in August 1998, after over twenty-one years behind bars. He died on 17 May 2009, from a suspected heart attack at his home and was given a paramilitary funeral by the UVF. With Moore now deceased, the only senior figure still alive is "Mr. A".

In November 2004, the Serious Crime Review Team in Belfast said they were looking into the unsolved death of Rosaleen O'Kane, aged 33 at the time of her death, who was found dead in her home in September 1976. Her family and authorities believe the Shankill Butchers may have been involved in her death.

McIlwaine, who survived a republican assassination attempt in 1991, has retained his links to the Orange Order and UVF.

== Gang members ==
The following were members of the gang and were convicted of various crimes.

- Lenny Murphy (1952–1982)
- John Murphy (1950–1998)
- William Moore (1949–2009)
- Robert Bates (1948–1997)
- Sam McAllister (1955–)
- Benjamin Edwards (1951–)
- John Townsley (1961–)
- Norman Waugh (1952–)
- Arthur McClay (1953–)
- David Bell (1953–)
- Edward McIlwaine (1953–)
- Edward Leckey

== List of victims ==
The following is a list of known and suspected victims of the Shankill Butchers.

Date	Name and age	Status	
2 October 1975	Marie McGrattan (47)	Catholic civilian	Shot dead at her workplace – Casey's Bottling Plant.
2 October 1975	Frances Donnelly (35)	Catholic civilian	Shot dead at her workplace – Casey's Bottling Plant.
2 October 1975	Gerard Grogan (18)	Catholic civilian	Shot dead at his workplace – Casey's Bottling Plant.
2 October 1975	Thomas Osborne (18)	Catholic civilian	Shot dead at his workplace – Casey's Bottling Plant. Died 23 October 1975.
25 November 1975	Francis Crossin (34)	Catholic civilian	Found badly beaten and with his throat slashed in an entry between Wimbledon Street and Bisley Street, middle Shankill.
30 November 1975	Noel Shaw (19)	UVF member	Found shot dead in a taxi in Nixon Street, off the Shankill Road. The killing was the result of an internal dispute.
10 January 1976	Edward McQuaid (25)	Catholic civilian	Killed in a drive-by shooting while walking along the Cliftonville Road.
6 February 1976	Thomas Quinn (55)	Catholic civilian	Found with his throat slashed on a grass bank off Forthriver Way.
9 February 1976	Archibald Hanna (51)	Protestant civilian	Shot, along with Raymond Carlisle, while sitting in a lorry in Cambrai Street. They were assumed to have been Catholics.
9 February 1976	Raymond Carlisle (27)	Protestant civilian	Shot, along with Archibald Hanna, while sitting in a lorry in Cambrai Street. They were assumed to have been Catholics.
22 February 1976	Francis Rice (24)	Catholic civilian	Found with his throat slashed in an entry between Mayo Street and Esmond Street, Shankill Road.
2 August 1976	Cornelius Neeson (49)	Catholic civilian	Found beaten to death at the junction of Manor Street and the Cliftonville Road. A hatchet was used in the attack.
30 October 1976	Stephen McCann (20)	Catholic civilian	Found with his throat slashed and shot near the community centre off the Forthriver Road.
20 December 1976	Thomas Easton (22)	Protestant civilian	Found beaten to death behind St Andrew's Church on the Forthriver Road. The killing was the result of a personal dispute.
31 January 1977	James Moorehead (30)	UDA member	Found beaten to death in Adela Street. The killing was the result of a personal dispute.
3 February 1977	Joseph Morrissey (52)	Catholic civilian	Found badly beaten and with his throat slashed near the community centre off the Forthriver Road. A hatchet was also used in the attack.
30 March 1977	Francis Cassidy (43)	Catholic civilian	Shot and found with his throat slashed on a grass verge off Highfern Gardens.
10 April 1977	Kevin McMenamin (7)	Catholic civilian	Killed in a bomb attack on a Republican Clubs Easter Rising commemoration parade, Beechmount Avenue.
10 May 1977	Gerard McLaverty (19/20)	Catholic civilian	Found in a back alley off Emerson Street. He had been beaten and stabbed, and his wrists had been slashed. He was the only victim of the Shankill Butchers to survive his injuries.
17 July 1982	Norman Maxwell (33)	Protestant civilian	Found beaten to death on waste ground off Alliance Road. He had suffered from a learning disability.
29 August 1982	James Galway (33)	Protestant civilian	Shot dead and found buried on a building site in Broughshane. He was suspected of being a police informer.
5 September 1982	Brian Smyth (30)	UVF member	Poisoned in a loyalist club before being shot from a passing motorbike in Crimea Street. The killing was the result of a personal dispute.
24 October 1982	Joseph Donegan (48)	Catholic civilian	Abducted, tortured and beaten to death; found in an entry off Brookmount Street.

== Song ==
Colin Meloy, lead singer and guitarist for the indie folk rock band The Decemberists, wrote a song titled "Shankill Butchers" recounting the faction's grisly exploits. The song appeared on the group's fourth album The Crane Wife, which was released by Capitol Records in 2006. The song was also covered by singer-songwriter Sarah Jarosz on her debut album Song Up in Her Head on the Sugar Hill Records label in 2009.

== See also ==
- Resurrection Man
- Timeline of Ulster Volunteer Force actions

== Sources ==
- Dillon, Martin (1999). The Shankill Butchers (2nd ed.). Psychology Press. ISBN 0-415-92231-3.
- "Murdered Man was not the Shankill Butcher, says mother", News Letter, 18 November 1982
- Milestones in Murder. Defining moments in Ulster's terrorist war (Hugh Jordan) (Mainstream Publishing, Edinburgh and London, 2002)
- Political Murder in Northern Ireland Martin Dillon and Denis Lehane (Penguin, 1973)
- Loyalists (Peter Taylor) (Bloomsbury, London, 1999)
- The Red Hand (Steve Bruce) (Oxford, 1992) pp. 183–91.
- "Murphy's Law: The Story of the Shankill Butchers" (Seamus McGraw), Tru TV
- Butcher Gang Survivor Found Dead (10 March 2008) BBC News:
- Lost Lives: The stories of the men, women and children who died through the Northern Ireland troubles (David McKittrick et al.), (Mainstream Publishing, 2nd revised edition, 2004).
