= Basher (nickname) =

As a nickname, Basher or the Basher may refer to:

== As "Basher" ==
- Robert Bates (loyalist) (1948–1997), a member of the loyalist Shankill Butchers gang from Belfast, Northern Ireland
- Basher Hassan (born 1944), Kenyan retired cricketer Sheikh Basharat Hassan
- Nick Lowe (born 1949), English singer-songwriter, musician and producer
- Jack "Basher" Williams (1917–2000), Australian rules footballer

== As "the Basher" ==
- Subhas Anandan (1947–2015), a prominent criminal lawyer in Singapore with numerous high-profile cases, including a 2010 case involving actress Quan Yi Fong

== See also ==
- Basher (disambiguation)
