= Samir Bishara =

Egyptian orthodontist

- Born: October 31, 1935; Cairo
- Died: October 8, 2010 (aged 74)
- Education: Alexandria University, University of Iowa College of Dentistry
- Medical career
- Profession: Dentist
- Institutions: University of Iowa College of Dentistry
- Sub-specialties: Orthodontics
- Research: Growth and Development

Samir Bishara (October 31, 1935 – October 8, 2010) was an Egyptian orthodontist.

== Biography ==
Samir Bishara was born in Cairo in 1935 to Edward and Georgette Bishara. He obtained his dental degree and his Orthodontic degree from Alexandria University. He practiced dentistry in Egypt for 11 years at Moassat Hospital in Alexandria after which he moved to New York City to work as a Pediatric Dentist at the Guggenheim Clinic. He then moved to University of Iowa College of Dentistry where he received his Orthodontic degree a second time. In 1968, he became a faculty at the Orthodontic Program of Iowa University and served there until 2010. Bishara was married to Anne Ghalioungui and had four daughters.

== Published works ==
Bishara has published over 200 scientific articles.

Bishara published an orthodontic textbook called Textbook of Orthodontics in 2001.

- SE Bishara, D Ortho, Impacted maxillary canines: A review, American journal of orthodontics and dentofacial, 1992
- E Bishara, RN Staley, Maxillary expansion: clinical implications, S American journal of orthodontics and dentofacial, 1987

== Death ==
Before he died, he was a still a Professor of Orthodontics at the University of Iowa College of Dentistry. He died at the age of 74 in 2010.
