= Resurrection Man (film) =

- Directed by: Marc Evans
- Written by: Eoin McNamee
- Produced by: Andrew Eaton; Michael Winterbottom (executive)
- Starring: Stuart Townsend; John Hannah; James Nesbitt; Brenda Fricker
- Music by: David Holmes
- Distributed by: PolyGram Filmed Entertainment
- Release date: 13 February 1998 (UK)
- Running time: 101 minutes
- Country: United Kingdom
- Language: English
- Budget: $2.5 million
- Box office: £116,841 (UK)

Resurrection Man is a 1998 Irish extreme horror period drama film, set specifically in Northern Ireland, directed by Marc Evans with a screenplay written by Eoin McNamee based on his novel of the same name. The story is loosely based on the real-life "Shankill Butchers", an Ulster loyalist gang in 1970s Belfast who conducted random killings of Catholic civilians until their leader, Lenny Murphy, was assassinated by a Provisional IRA hit squad.

== Cast ==
- Stuart Townsend – Victor Kelly
- John Hannah – Darkie Larche
- James Nesbitt – Ryan
- James Ellis – Coppinger
- Brenda Fricker – Dorcas Kelly
- Geraldine O'Rawe – Heather Graham
- Seán McGinley – Sammy McClure
- George Shane – James Kelly

== Production ==
Although set in Belfast, Resurrection Man was not filmed there, with the English cities of Manchester, Liverpool and Warrington serving as the film's locations.

== Critical reception and analysis ==
In an essay entitled "Vampire Troubles: Loyalism and Resurrection Man", academic Steve Baker argues that the film can be interpreted as a vampire film, "situating it within a loyalist self image of vampirism". In fact, Stuart Townsend's performance in this film was what prompted Michael Rymer to cast him the role of the Vampire Lestat in Queen of the Damned.
