= James Wilson (Orangeman) =

James Wilson was the founder of the Orange Institution, also known as the Orange Order.

After a disturbance in Benburb on 24 June 1794, in which Protestant homes were attacked, Wilson appealed to the Freemasons, of which he was a member, to organise themselves in defence of the Protestant population.

The Masons refused, so an indignant Wilson left them and prophesied that he "would light a star...which would eclipse them forever". He had already organised the "Orange Boys" at the Dyan in County Tyrone in 1792, as is evidenced by the notice in The News Letter on 1 February 1793 which referred to a meeting of the 138 members of the Orange Boys held on 22 January 1793.

The three main founders were James Wilson, Daniel Winter and James Sloan. It was named to commemorate the victory of the Protestant William of Orange over his father-in-law the Catholic King James II at the Battle of the Boyne in 1690 during the Glorious Revolution.
