= Béchara Abou Mrad =

Lebanese Melkite priest (1853–1930)

Venerable Béchara Abou Mrad B.S.O.

Melkite Priest and Monk
- Born: Selim Jabbour Abou-Mourad; 19 May 1853; Zahleh, Al Biqa’, Lebanon
- Died: 22 February 1930 (aged 76); Sidon Al-Janub, Lebanon
- Venerated in: Catholic Church; Melkite Greek Catholic Church
- Major shrine: Holy Saviour Church, Sidon Al-Janub, Lebanon
- Feast: 22 February
- Attributes: Religious habit Prayer rope
- Patronage: Lebanon

Béchara Abou Mrad, BSO (19 May 1853 – 22 February 1930) was a Lebanese Melkite priest and monk. He was declared Venerable by Pope Benedict XVI and was approved for beatification in 2026. He was a member of the Basilian Salvatorian Order.

== Early life ==
He was born on 19 May 1853 at Zahleh, Al Beqaa’, Lebanon. His birth name was Selim Jabbour Abou-Mourad (Arabic: سليم جبور أبو مراد). His Mother's name was Elisabeth Al-Kach or (Ash).

== Religious life ==
He entered St. Savior's Monastery on 5 September 1874. He entered the novitiate of the Basilian Salvatorian Order on 19 September 1874. He took the name 'Béchara' meaning "Good News" as his religious name.

Took his vows on 4 November 1876. He was ordained deacon on 26 March 1882 in the chapel of Holy Savior Seminary by Msgr. Basilios Hajjar.

Monk Béchara was ordained to the priesthood on 26 December 1883 in the Church of Holy Savior Monastery by Msgr. Basilios Hajjar.

He worked as Director of Discipline, confessor and spiritual director in the seminary of the Salvatorian Fathers. Between 8 November 1891, and 4 December 1922, he served as itinerant missionary in the district of Deir al-Qamar, Mount Lebanon.

He served as a parish priest and confessor at Sidon Cathedral in South Lebanon from 4 December 1922 till 1 February 1927.

== Death ==
He died on 22 February 1930 at the Holy Savior Monastery, near Sidon.

Funeral service and burial were celebrated at the Holy Savior Church. He is buried at the Holy Saviour Church, Sidon Al-Janub, Lebanon.

== Cause of beatification and canonization ==
Pope Benedict XVI issued a decree on Saturday, 11 December 2010, naming Monk Béchara as Venerable among others. He was approved for beatification in 2026.
