= Bashir =

Bashir, al-Bashir or Al-Bashir may refer to:

== People ==
- Bashir (name), notably borne as a mononym by
  - Bashir I, Lebanese emir of the Shihab dynasty
  - Bashir Shihab II (1767–1850), Lebanese emir who ruled Lebanon
  - Bashir III (1775–1860), ruler of the Mount Lebanon Emirate (7th Emir, reigned 1840–1842)
- Omar al-Bashir (born 1944), former president of Sudan

== Places ==
- Bashir, Iran, a village in East Azerbaijan Province
- Bashir, Iraq, a village south of Kirkuk
- Béchir, a village in Algeria
- Beni Bechir, a town and commune, Algeria
- Sidi Bashir Mosque, former mosque in the city of Ahmedabad, Gujarat, India
- El Bachir Stadium, Mohammedia, Morocco

== Other uses ==
- Al-Bashir, Arabic-language Catholic magazine published in Beirut from 1870 to 1947

== See also ==
- Bishara, also Bechara, Béchara and Beshara, a given name
- Bashir with a Good Beard, a song from the We Are Lady Parts soundtrack
