= Turlough O'Donnell =

Northern Irish judge

The Rt. Hon. Turlough O'Donnell, PC, QC (5 August 1924 – 21 April 2017), was an Irish lawyer and judge. He was a Lord Justice of Appeal of Northern Ireland from 1979 to 1989.

== Biography ==
O'Donnell was born in Bridge Street in Newry to a working-class Catholic family, the son of Charles (Charlie) and Eileen O'Donnell (née McAllister). His mother was from the Glens of Antrim. He was educated at the Abbey Grammar School, Newry, and The Queen's University of Belfast, where he took a LLB. He was called to the Bar of Northern Ireland in 1947. He was appointed a Queen's Counsel (QC) in 1964. As a lawyer, he defended Robert McGladdery, the last man to be hanged anywhere in Ireland.

In 1971, O'Donnell was appointed a Justice of the High Court of Northern Ireland. In 1979, he was promoted a Lord Justice of Appeal and was sworn of the Privy Council, having declined the customary knighthood. He retired in 1989.

Lord Justice O'Donnell was one of the few senior Catholic judges on the Northern Irish bench and he frequently came under threat. In 1979, he tried the Shankill Butchers and gave out 42 life sentences, a record in British legal history.

He was Chairman of the Northern Ireland Bar Council from 1970 to 1971, and of the Council of Legal Education (Northern Ireland) from 1980 to 1990.

Upon his retirement from the bench in 1989, O'Donnell and his wife moved to Blackrock in County Louth, where they spent the rest of their lives. At his death, his Requiem Mass was held in the Church of St. Oliver Plunkett in Blackrock.

== Family ==
O'Donnell married Eileen McKinley (died 2008) from Dundalk in 1954; they had two sons and two daughters. Of his sons, Turlough O'Donnell, SC, was Chairman of the General Council of the Bar of Ireland from 2016 to 2018, and Donal O'Donnell was directly appointed from the Irish Bar to the Supreme Court of Ireland in 2010, before becoming Chief Justice of Ireland in 2021.
