= Lenny Murphy =

Northern Irish loyalist (1952–1982)

- Murphy in 1982
- Born: Hugh Leonard Thompson Murphy; 2 March 1952; Shankill Road, Belfast, Northern Ireland
- Died: 16 November 1982 (aged 30); Forthriver Road, Belfast, Northern Ireland
- Cause of death: Multiple gunshot wounds
- Other name: Lenny Murphy
- Known for: Leader of the Shankill Butchers
- Criminal information
- Status: Executed by the Provisional Irish Republican Army
- Criminal charge: Illegal possession of a firearm
- Penalty: 12 years imprisonment
- Military career
- Allegiance: Northern Ireland
- Paramilitary: Ulster Volunteer Force
- Unit: Shankill Butchers
- Conflict: The Troubles

Hugh Leonard Thompson Murphy (2 March 1952 – 16 November 1982) was a Northern Irish loyalist and UVF officer. As leader of the Shankill Butchers gang, Murphy was responsible for the murders of mainly Catholic civilians, often first kidnapping and torturing his victims, in the Shankill area of Belfast, Northern Ireland. Due to a lack of evidence, Murphy was never brought to trial for these killings, for which some of his followers had already received long sentences in 1979.

In the summer of 1982, Murphy was released just over half-way through a 12-year sentence for other offences. He returned to the Shankill Road, where he embarked on a murder spree. Details of his movements were passed by rival loyalist paramilitaries to the Provisional IRA, who shot Murphy dead that autumn.

== Early life ==
Murphy was the youngest of three sons of William and Joyce Murphy from the loyalist Shankill Road, Belfast. His elder brothers were William Jr. and John. William Sr. was originally from Fleet Street, Sailortown in the Belfast docks area, where he met Joyce Thompson, who came from the Shankill. Like his own father (also named William), William Sr. worked as a dock labourer. The Murphy family changed their residence several times; in 1957 they returned to Joyce's family home in the Lower Shankill, at 28 Percy Street. Murphy did not use his first name "Hugh" possibly because of its close resemblance to the surname "Hughes", common among Irish Catholics, which, when coupled with the conspicuously Irish surname Murphy, might have communicated a Catholic connotation. Prior to the erection of a peace wall in the 1970s, Percy Street ran from the mainly Protestant lower Shankill area to the mainly Catholic Falls Road. At Argyle Primary School, he was known for using a knife and had his elder brothers back him up; received his first conviction at the age of twelve for theft. After leaving the Belfast Boys' Model School at sixteen, he joined the Ulster Volunteer Force (UVF) and was involved in the rioting that broke out in Belfast in August 1969.

In his book The Shankill Butchers, Belfast journalist Martin Dillon suggests Murphy's anti-Catholicism may have stemmed from his bearing a surname associated with Catholics. He brought this hatred of Catholics into all his conversations, often referring to them as "scum" and "animals". He held a steady job as a shop assistant, although his increasing criminal activities enabled him to indulge in a flamboyant lifestyle which involved heavy drinking and socialising with an array of young women.

Dillon wrote that it is "incredible to think that Murphy was in fact a murderer at the age of twenty" (1972). Physically, Murphy was below average height, of slim build and sallow complexion, blue eyed and with curly dark brown hair. He sported several tattoos, most of Ulster loyalist images. He was a flashy dresser, often wearing a leather jacket and scarf, and occasionally leather driving gloves, similar to those worn by a World War I fighter-pilot.

== First crimes ==
According to Dillon, Murphy was involved in the torture and murder of four Catholic men as early as 1972. On 28 September of that year, a Protestant man named William Edward Pavis, who had gone bird shooting with a Catholic priest, was killed at his home in East Belfast. Pavis had been threatened by loyalists, who accused him of selling firearms to the Provisional IRA. Murphy and an accomplice, Mervyn Connor, were arrested for this crime. During pre-trial investigations, Murphy was placed in a line-up for possible identification by witnesses to Pavis' shooting. Before the process began formally, he created a disturbance and stepped out of the line-up. However, two witnesses picked him out when order was restored.

Connor and Murphy were held in prison together but, in April 1973, before the trial, Connor died after ingesting cyanide in his cell. He had written a suicide note in which he confessed to the crime and exonerated Murphy. It is believed Connor was forced to write the note and take the cyanide. Murphy was sent to trial for the murder of Pavis in June 1973. Although two witnesses identified him as the gunman, he was acquitted on the basis that their evidence may have been contaminated by the disturbance during the police line-up inquiry. However, Murphy was re-arrested and jailed for attempted escapes.

By May 1975, Murphy, now aged twenty-three, was back on the streets of Belfast. On 5 May 1973, inside Crumlin Road prison, he had married 19-year-old Margaret Gillespie, with whom he had a daughter. He moved his wife and child to Brookmount Street in the Upper Shankill, where his parents had a new home. Murphy spent much of his time drinking in Shankill pubs such as The Brown Bear and Lawnbrook Social Club. He also frequented the Bayardo Bar in Aberdeen Street. Murphy later told a Provisional IRA inmate that on 13 August 1975 he had just left the Bayardo ten minutes before the Provisional IRA carried out a gun and bombing attack against the pub which killed a UVF man and four other Protestants and left over 50 injured. With his brother William he soon formed a gang of more than twenty men that would become known as the Shankill Butchers, one of his lieutenants being William Moore.

== Shankill Butchers murders ==
The gang shot dead four Catholics (two men and two women) during a robbery at a warehouse in October 1975. Over the next few months, the gang began abducting, torturing and murdering random Catholic men they dragged off the streets late at night. Murphy regarded the use of a blade as the "ultimate way to kill", ending the torture by hacking each victim's throat open with a butcher's knife. By February 1976 the gang had killed three Catholic men in this manner. Murphy achieved status through his paramilitary activity and was widely known in the Shankill. Many regarded his crimes as shaming the community but feared the consequences of testifying against him. None of the victims had any connection to the Provisional IRA, and there was suspicion among some of their families that the murders were not properly investigated because those being killed were Catholics.

The Butchers were also involved in the murder of Noel Shaw, a loyalist from a rival UVF unit, who had shot dead Butcher gang-member Archie Waller in Downing Street, off the Shankill Road, in November 1975. Four days before his death, Waller had been involved in the abduction and murder of the Butchers' first victim, Francis Crossin. One day after Waller's death, Shaw was beaten and pistol-whipped by Murphy while strapped to a chair, then shot. His body was later dumped in a back street off the Shankill.

By the end of 1975, the UVF Brigade Staff had a new leadership of "moderates", but Murphy refused to submit to their authority, preferring to carry out attacks using his own methods. Dillon suggested that some Brigade Staff knew about Murphy's activities (albeit not the precise details) but were too frightened to put a stop to it. This suggestion was given further credibility by Gusty Spence, when he was asked by BBC journalist Peter Taylor in a 1998 interview why the leadership of the UVF failed to stop the Butchers. "I don't think they had the bottle to stop them", was Spence's reply. On 10 January 1976, Murphy and Moore killed a Catholic man, Edward McQuaid (25), on the Cliftonville Road. Murphy, alighting from Moore's taxi in the small hours, shot the man six times at close range.

== Imprisonment ==
Early on 11 March 1976, Murphy shot and injured a young Catholic woman, once again on the Cliftonville Road. Arrested the next day after attempting to retrieve the gun used, Murphy was charged with attempted murder and remanded in custody for a prolonged period. However, he was able to plea bargain whereby he was allowed to plead guilty to the lesser charge of a firearms offence, and received twelve years' imprisonment on 11 October 1977. Dillon notes that the police believed Murphy was involved in the Shankill Butcher murders. To divert suspicion from himself, Murphy ordered the rest of the gang to continue the cut-throat murders while he was in prison. The Butchers, now under the operational command of William Moore, went on to kill and mutilate at least three more Catholics.

The team of Criminal Investigation Department (CID) detectives investigating the murders was led by Detective Chief Inspector Jimmy Nesbitt who headed C Division based at Tennent Street off the Shankill Road. However, the police were overworked during this period and little progress was made in the investigation until one victim, Gerard McLaverty, survived his assault. Detectives were driving him down the Shankill Road on the way to the scene of his abduction when he recognised two of his assailants walking in the street. This identification of Sam McAllister and Benjamin Edwards led to the arrest of much of the gang in May 1977 and, in February 1979, they were imprisoned for long periods. Confessions of gang members had named Murphy as the leader but statements incriminating him were later retracted. He was questioned once again about the Butcher murders but denied involvement. The total of sentences handed down to the gang at Belfast Crown Court was the longest in legal history in the UK.

== Last months on the Shankill ==
On completing his sentence for the firearms charge, Lenny Murphy walked out of the Maze Prison on Friday, 16 July 1982. During his term inside, his wife Margaret initiated divorce proceedings which were being finalised at the time of his death.

Murphy killed at least four more people over the next four months. He beat a partially disabled man to death one day after returning to the Shankill. Another victim sold him a car and was shot dead after demanding full payment. Murphy also attempted to extort money from local businessmen who had been sympathetic in the past, however this encroached on other loyalist paramilitaries with established protection rackets.

In late August 1982, Murphy killed a part-time Ulster Defence Regiment soldier from the lower Shankill area who was closely involved with the UVF in Ballymena and was allegedly an informer. The man's body was not discovered for almost a year. In mid-October, Murphy and several associates kidnapped a 48 year-old Catholic man, who was then tortured and beaten to death in Murphy's own house (temporarily vacated due to renovations). Murphy, who had left the house strewn with the victim's blood and teeth, was arrested for questioning the next morning but later released. The sadism of the widely publicised killing led to loyalism receiving a great deal of bad publicity and leading UVF figures concluded that Murphy's horrific methods had made him too much of a liability.

== Death ==
On 16 November 1982, Murphy had just pulled up outside the rear of his girlfriend's house on the Forthriver Road area of Glencairn, a part of the Greater Shankill area, when two Provisional IRA gunmen – one of them believed to be Gerard "Hucker" Moyna – emerged from a black van nearby and opened fire with a sub-machine gun and a 9mm pistol. Murphy was hit by more than twenty rounds and died instantly. He was gunned down just around the corner from where the bodies of many of the Butchers' victims had been dumped. A few days after his death, the Provisional IRA claimed responsibility. According to Royal Ulster Constabulary reports, the UVF had provided the Provisional IRA hit team with the details of Murphy's habits and movements, which allowed them to assassinate him at that particular location. Another line of inquiry ends at Ulster Defence Association (UDA) leader James Craig, who saw Murphy as a serious threat to his widespread racketeering and leaked crucial information on Murphy's movements to the Provisional IRA. Craig was known to meet republican paramilitary commanders to discuss racketeering activities: he was later killed by his comrades, officially for "treason". Top UDA member, Samuel McCrory, alleged that the weapon used to kill Murphy, which he stated was a Sterling submachine gun, had also been supplied by Craig.

Murphy was given a large paramilitary funeral by the UVF with a guard of honour wearing the UVF uniform and balaclavas. A volley of three shots was fired over his coffin as it was brought out of his house and a piper played "Abide with Me". He was buried in Carnmoney Cemetery; on his tombstone the following words were inscribed: "Here Lies a Soldier". May Blood, Baroness Blood, a Shankill Road community representative, said: "My father was a soldier. My father fought in two World Wars. They were real heroes. Lenny Murphy wasn't a hero; he was a murdering thug." The tombstone was smashed in 1989. His photograph was displayed inside "The Eagle", the UVF Brigade Staff's headquarters over a chip shop in the Shankill Road. According to investigative journalist Paul Larkin, Murphy's photograph was on display up until the late 1990s.

== See also ==
- Resurrection Man (film)
- Timeline of Ulster Volunteer Force actions
