= Martin Dillon =

Northern Irish journalist and author (born 1949)

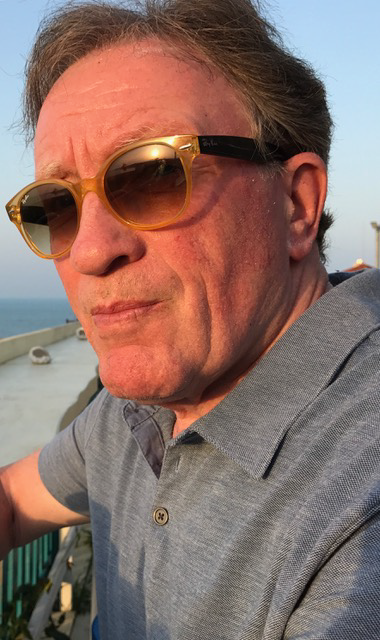
- Dillon in 2020
- Born: 2 June 1949 (age 77); Belfast, Northern Ireland
- Occupations: Writer, journalist
- Spouse: Violeta Kumurdjieva (2003)
- Writing career
- Genres: Non-fiction, fiction, drama
- Subjects: Northern Ireland troubles, political violence, terrorism
- Website: martindillon.net

Martin Dillon (born 2 June 1949) is an Irish author, journalist, and broadcaster. He has won international acclaim for his investigative reporting and non-fiction works on the Troubles, including his bestselling trilogy, The Shankill Butchers, The Dirty War and God and the Gun, about the Northern Ireland conflict. The historian and scholar, Dr. Conor Cruise O'Brien, described him as "our Virgil to that Inferno". The Irish Times hailed him as "one of the most creative writers of our time".

== Early life ==
Martin Dillon was born in the Lower Falls area of West Belfast, Northern Ireland. He grew up with nine siblings in a traditional Catholic household. His mother, Maureen, looked after the children while his father, Gerard, worked as a watch maker and later telephone engineer to support his large family. Dillon attended St Finian's Primary School on the Falls Road.

In 1961, aged twelve, he left Belfast to pursue a religious vocation at Montfort College Seminary in Romsey, Hampshire. The seminary was run by the Montfort Fathers, a French religious Order devoted to the teachings of St. Louis Marie de Montfort. After four years, he abandoned it and returned to Belfast to finish his studies at St Malachy's College and St Patrick's, Barnageeha. He attended Belfast College of Business Studies in 1970.

== Career ==
=== Investigative journalism and first non-fiction book ===
Martin Dillon began his distinguished career as a newspaper reporter in 1968. He trained with The Irish News, a daily newspaper with a mainly Irish Nationalist readership, and contributed to its weekly publication, The Irish Weekly. He reported on a variety of events including those related to The Troubles in Northern Ireland.

In 1972, he joined the Belfast Telegraph. Mackay, 2017 stated "As an investigative journalist Dillon tried to reveal objectively the truth about the Northern Ireland Conflict. Under his forensic gaze, the cruelties and failings of all sides were exposed, whether they were Loyalist, Republican or British"

Dillon valued his early years in journalism because of the challenges and unique experiences that later found expression in his non-fiction works. In 1973 Dillon published his first non-fiction book, "Political Murder in Northern Ireland"(co-authored with Denis Lehane). The content of the book is based on much of Dillon's own journalistic research and reporting for the Irish News and Belfast Telegraph.

=== BBC years ===
==== Radio broadcaster, producer/writer, creator of programmes and TV shows ====
In 1973, Dillon joined BBC Northern Ireland’s Newsroom as a News Assistant. In 1975, he became a Radio Arts producer and later ran the General Programmes Radio Department, which constituted the majority of BBC Radio Ulster's output. In that role, he created the Behind the Headlines and Talkback programmes. Talkback broke the "normal rules of broadcasting", over 31 years ago. In 2016, Talkback celebrated its thirtieth anniversary.

In 1985, while working as a producer of the Behind the Headlines, he persuaded SDLP leader, John Hume, and Provisional Sinn Féin President, Gerry Adams, to debate their political positions live on the programme. During the broadcast, John Hume agreed to meet the Provisional IRA's Army Council. It was a controversial decision by him, but also a defining moment that led to open a dialogue with the Provisionals. The debate proved to be a seminal element in the genesis of the Northern Ireland peace process. Dillon also introduced John Hume to UDA paramilitary leader, John McMichael, credited with running assassination teams in Northern Ireland.

He was offered a contract to work as a producer/writer with BBC 2 award-winning documentary department, Timewatch. His role was to script and produce a major series on the Northern Ireland Troubles. After a year working with the Timewatch, he clashed with the BBC authorities and resigned, reaching a financial settlement.

During his 18 years work for the BBC, Dillon created and produced some award-winning TV programmes. "A brilliant producer (for BBC Northern Ireland radio and TV), Dillon recruited talented outsiders and created iconoclastic programmes that brought people living in the most afflicted areas into furious dialogue on air with politicians, police chiefs, comedians and writers. He worked with Paul Muldoon, became friends with Denis Johnston and Seán Ó Faoláin" (McKay, 2017).

Reviewing Crossing The Line "Brave chronicler of the Troubles who made a point of crossing the line. Martin Dillon was always determined to uncover the truth of our sordid war AS far as I’m concerned, Martin Dillon changed the way the Troubles were reported." (Jordan, Sunday World, 17 September 2017)

Throughout his broadcasting career, Dillon was known for his abrasive style and controversial programming. He fought against the BBC’s interpretation of balance in its news and current affairs output. His views brought him a lot of frustration and disillusionment with the BBC narrow interpretation of the concept of balance, which left the BBC’s Current Affairs department vulnerable to political manipulation in the divisive atmosphere of Northern Ireland.

TV commentator, columnist, terrorism analyst and expert

In 1992 Dillon left the BBC to pursue his writing career. He subsequently became a terrorism analyst and commentator for Sky Television and other television and radio networks. In 1992, he presented a television documentary The Last Colony for Channel Four and RTÉ. It examined the origins of The Troubles, focusing on the confusing nature and failure of much of British policymaking of the period, especially of the Tory government led by Prime Minister Edward Heath. The documentary also contained some sensational revelations, including Heath’s secret declaration that it was legal for British soldiers to shoot protesters on the streets of Northern Ireland because they were "enemies of the Crown". Later, it formed part of the evidence against Heath at the Bloody Sunday Tribunal in 2003. During that period Dillon published seven best-selling books on the Irish conflict and three plays for radio and television. He also contributed as a TV commentator and terrorism expert to several networks including BBC, RTÉ, Sky TV and Channel Four.

=== Literary works and themes ===
In his bestselling trilogy The Shankill Butchers, The Dirty War and God and the Gun, Dillon offers a balanced and objective perspective of the conflict, the participants and their motives. As the Irish Times put it "Dillon is recommended reading for anyone wishing to understand the complexities of the British – Irish politics".

The Shankill Butchers, A Case Study of Mass Murder, 1989, is a study of Northern Ireland's infamous Shankill butchers gang who preyed on Belfast Catholics. Dillon exposes the depravity of the UVF gang that was run by an aggressive psychopath, Lenny Murphy, with the help of one of his brothers. The gang performed unspeakable acts on helpless victims, killing them in a gruesome fashion. Dillon painstakingly interviewed countless civilians, paramilitaries and police officers in compiling the book. According to the Listener, "the great value of Martin Dillon's carefully researched and readable work is that it enters a world that few journalists have been inclined or able to penetrate".

The Dirty War, 1990, is a detailed account of the undercover struggle in which all sides fought a no-rules battle, using spies, informants, assassins, disinformation and terrorist agents. Dillon examines the roles played by the Provisional IRA, British Intelligence, including MI5 and Special Branch, British Military Intelligence, the Irish Government, and the British Army, and reveals disturbing facts about the way in which terrorists and the Intelligence agencies targeted, undermined and penetrated each other’s ranks. Within the pages of the book Dillon was one of the first to expose the IRA's practice of executing and secretly burying some of its victims; a practice which subsequently led to public demands for the IRA to reveal the whereabouts of those it made "disappear". He also unraveled the use of state-sponsored terrorism and the phenomenon of "Rompering", a form of sadistic torture used by the paramilitaries.

Killer in Clowntown – Joe Doherty the IRA and the Special Relationship, 1992, is the tale of Joe Doherty, the convicted IRA gunman who captured American popular opinion by frustrating the British Government’s attempts to have him extradited from New York to Northern Ireland to serve a 30-year prison sentence for murdering a British Special Air Services Officer. Dillon traces Doherty’s terror history, providing personal insights into legal events inside the US Attorney’s office in New York. He unveils proof of Prime Minister Margaret Thatcher's secret intervention in the case, including how she told the Americans overseeing the Doherty case that she considered his extradition to Britain a quid pro quo for her allowing U.S. jets to use British airspace on the way to bomb Libya.

Dillon was asked by the Federal Court in New York to provide testimony about the inner workings of the IRA, based on his work The Dirty War. He agreed on condition he would be judged a "friend of the court" witness and not one seen to be supporting one or the other side in the case. In the end, he was not called to give evidence. According to The Guardian, "Dillon's book demands the attention of anyone concerned about civil liberties in the United Kingdom…a catalogue of cynicism, lies, harassment, torture and murder that makes the Cold war duplicity a la Deighton and Le Carre seem positively endearing".

In Stone Cold: True Story of Michael Stone and the Milltown Massacre, 1992, Dillon portrays Michael Stone, a natural born killer, infamous for his murder spree during an IRA funeral in Belfast’s Milltown Cemetery in March 1988. Stone, armed to the teeth, fired into the crowd of mourners, killing three men and wounding several others. His targets had been the Provisional IRA leaders present at the graveside, in particular Gerry Adams and Martin McGuinness. Stone was captured and confessed to a list of other murders, which landed him a life sentence in the Maze Prison where he became a Loyalist icon. Drawing on conversations with Stone in prison, including correspondence with him, as well as on a network of contacts in the military and paramilitary world, Dillon provides a portrait of a charming, boastful, meticulous, sentimental and lethal killer. According to Time Out: "Dillon brings his customary expertise to this latest expose of Government complicity in sectarian murder, and delves into the byzantine world of terrorist organization with impressive results".

In The Enemy Within: The IRA War Against the British, 1994, Dillon examines the IRA bombing campaign in Britain before and after the Second World War, and through to the 1970s and 80s. He analyzes the IRA's flirtation with Nazism and how Éire's wartime neutrality conditioned subsequent British policy towards Ireland. Dillon applies his extensive knowledge on the subject to provide new evidence of the political and military mistakes, which he argues, made British cities the most vulnerable in Europe to terrorist attacks. In fact, Dillon reveals for the first time the existence of what the IRA called its "England Department." He explains why the British Government held secret talks with the IRA/ Sinn Féin amid the carnage of Warrington, and what was behind the IRA’s reluctance to denounce the Downing Street Declaration. It is his contention that the various Government agencies combating the IRA failed to eradicate the terrorist thread, leading to intrigue among them and to MI5 being given the sole responsibility for coordinating the war against the Provisionals.

25 years of Terror: The IRA’s War against the British, 1996, is the revised edition of The Enemy Within, 1994. Dillon provides the first comprehensive survey of the IRA in Britain. According to Sunday Telegraph, UK: "Dillon's account is packed with new information and should be required reading. It is a serious study, well researched and competently written".

The Serpent’s Tail, 1995, is Dillon’s first novel, based on a true-life story set against a background of ordinary family life in Catholic West Belfast. Dillon traces the steps of two young Belfast Catholics recruited as informers, who found themselves at the heart of a "sting" involving the IRA, the SAS and MI5. The film script of the novel won European Script Fund award in 1995.

In God and the Gun – The Church and Irish Terrorism, 1997, Dillon explores the nexus of religion and paramilitarism. Dillon interviewed paramilitaries and religious figures to discern whether this is a religious war or one of economics and class. The interviewees included the late Billy Wright, a.k.a. "King Rat", a notorious Protestant assassin killed by the INLA in prison in 1997, Protestant terrorist Pastor Kenny McClinton, and Fr. Pat Buckley who admitted breaking the seal of the confessional to save lives on both sides. According to Publishers Weekly: "Dillon has written an eye-opening book about a sometimes-incomprehensible sectarian situation".

In The Trigger Men: Assassins and Terror Bosses in the Ireland Conflict, 2003, Dillon delves into the dark and sinister world of Irish terrorism and counterterrorism. He analyzes the personalities of some of the most dangerous, professional and ruthless killers in Northern Ireland, their motivations and the bizarre crimes they committed. Their individual stories are told in gripping, unflinching detail. Dillon also exposes the ideology of the cult of the gunmen and the greed combined with hatred that motivated the assassins in their killing sprees. He presents penetrating insights into the mindset of terrorist Godfathers and their triggermen like the infamous Protestant assassin Billy Wright, the INLA leader Dominic McGlinchey, "Mad Dog" Johnny Adair, the UDA hitman, Michael Stone, and British terrorist agent, Brian Nelson.

Dillon co-authored with Rt. Hon. Roy Bradford Rogue Warrior of the SAS: A Biography of Col. "Paddy" Blair Mayne, 1987. Lt. Col. "Paddy" Blair Mayne is regarded as one of the greatest soldiers in the history of military special operations. He is the most decorated fighting soldier of WWII, receiving four DSOs, the Croix de Guerre, and the Legion d’Honneur. He was one of the six founder members of the SAS and pioneered tactics used today by Special Forces units across the globe. His exploits against Rommel's Desert forces and against the Nazis in Italy, France and Germany were legendary. His courage, initiative and wildness made him a giant among his men. He was, however, denied the ultimate accolade of the Victoria Cross because of his unorthodox rules of war and his resentment of authority.

In 2002, Dillon updated the new, revised edition Rogue Warrior of the SAS - the Blair Mayne Legend, 2003 for Mainstream publishing. Dillon added a postscript with new facts about Mayne's conflicted personal life, in particular, his sexuality, which was a topic purposely omitted in the first edition of the book. Drawing on Mayne's personal letters and family papers, SAS secret records (now declassified), his own war diaries and eyewitness accounts from many who served with him, Dillon presents a compelling and perceptive portrait of a very special warrior.

The Assassination of Robert Maxwell: Israel’s Superspy, 2002, (co-authored with Gordon Thomas) is a biography of media mogul, Robert Maxwell, who played a crucial role for Israel's Mossad spy agency. The authors unveil explosive revelations about Maxwell’s links to global organized crime, and his schemes to access White House, 10 Downing Street, and the Kremlin, in order to obtain knowledge of highly guarded secrets for Israel. Drawing on private interviews with senior intelligence officers and other integral players, Dillon and Thomas examine the clues, contradictions and cover-up surrounding Maxwell's sudden and suspicious death. Dillon, using his sources within East European intelligence agencies and the FBI, charts Maxwell's secret activities in Eastern Europe, especially his personal ties to KGB bosses during the Cold War.

In his 2017 memoir Crossing the Line-My Life on the Edge, Dillon, according to the Irish Times "details a life that's involved many incredible moments: witnessing the horrors of the Troubles; encounters with major political figures and paramilitaries; rubbing shoulders with Irish literary greats; a successful broadcasting career, but one where he butted heads with BBC management; and having to leave Northern Ireland because of death threats. Dillon’s book is replete with such colourful stories involving the politicians, terrorists, artists and writers he met while covering the conflict in Northern Ireland".

The Squad, 1976, is one of the first plays about the Troubles. It was produced on BBC Radio 3 and BBC2 TV by Ronald Mason, the Head of BBC Radio 3 Drama department.

"He has that unique knack of combining forensic historical fact-based research with the art of thriller-like writing. His books have accurately chartered the terror and the horror of recent Northern Irish history but always in a tone of compassion for the innocent victims caught up in conflict. Works like his 'The Shankill Butchers' and 'The Dirty War' stand the test of time and will be essential reading for generations to come for those trying to make sense out of the madness that was 'The Troubles'" (Henry McDonald; author, journalist and Ireland correspondent for The Guardian.)

== Personal life ==
As a journalist and writer, Dillon’s life has been intertwined with the history of the Troubles and its darkest days. Because of his investigative work in Northern Ireland, Dillon received numerous death threats.

In 1992, he left Ireland with his family, moving first to England, before settling in France where he continued to write about the Irish conflict and publish bestselling books.

After his divorce from his wife, Katherine Dillon (2000), from whom he has a daughter Nadia Katherine Dillon, born in 1988, he visited New York at the invitation of his publisher, and while there, he decided to make New York his home. He went on to write and broadcast for news outlets in the U.S. and Canada, appearing on CNN, ABC, NPR and NBC as a guest and a global expert on terrorism and organized crime.

In 2003, he married, Violeta Kumurdjieva, a Bulgarian journalist and translator. In 2014, they moved from New York City to San Francisco Bay area, California, where Dillon continues to work on his journalism, television and book projects.

== Bibliography ==
=== Non-fiction ===
- Political Murder in Northern Ireland (co-authored with Denis Lehane), 1973
- Rogue Warrior of the SAS: A biography of Col. "Paddy" Blair Mayne (co-authored with Roy Bradford), 1987
- Rogue Warrior of the SAS: The Blair Mayne Legend, with late Roy Bradford, 2003, revised edition, updated by Dillon
- The Shankill Butchers: A Case Study of Mass Murder (1989)
- The Dirty War (1990)
- Stone Cold: True Story of Michael Stone and the Milltown Massacre (1992)
- Killer in Clowntown: Joe Doherty, the IRA and the Special Relationship (1992)
- The Enemy Within (1994)
- 25 Years of Terror: The IRA's War Against the British (1996; revised edition of The Enemy Within)
- God and the Gun: The Church and Irish Terrorism (1997)
- The Assassination of Robert Maxwell: Israel's Superspy (co-authored with Gordon Thomas; 2002)
- Robert Maxwell, Israel's Superspy: The Life and Murder of a Media Mogul, 2002 (American edition)
- The Trigger Men (2003)
- Shankill Butchers/The Dirty War/Stone Cold—Three Books in One (2006)
- Crossing the Line: My Life on the Edge (2017)

=== Fiction ===
- The Serpent's Tail, 1995

=== Plays ===
- The Squad, 1976 (BBC Radio Three, BBC2 TV)
- The Waiting Room, 1976
- The Dog, 1976

=== Screenplays ===
- The Serpent's Tail (1995)
- Other Men's Flowers (2002)

=== Short stories ===
- Jimmy the Natural (2011; published in The Best Travel Writing 2011: True Stories from Around the World Anthology, 2011)
- The Last Confession (2000; published in Ireland: True Stories of Life on the Emerald Isle, Travelers' Tales Anthology, 2000)

== Awards ==
In 1995, the screenplay of the novel, The Serpent’s Tail won a European Script Fund Award.

== See also ==
- List of writers from Northern Ireland
