= Alan Campbell (pastor) =

Northern Irish pastor and loyalist (1949–2017)

Joseph Alan Johnston Campbell (7 August 1949 – 11 June 2017) was a Northern Irish Pentecostal pastor and Orangeman from Belfast. He founded and served as pastor and director of the Restored Open Bible Ministries in Northern Ireland. He was an author on Bible studies, a lecturer in the British Israelism movement and an advocate of white supremacy. Strongly opposed to Catholicism, Campbell published anti-Catholic literature and argued that the white Celto Anglo Saxon peoples of the world represent the lost tribes of the northern kingdom of Israel. He was known in Historicist circles due to his denial of the Westminster Confession of Faith, while Fundamentalist Protestants rejected his teachings as not being biblical.

Although not a leading figure, Campbell was unapologetically loyalist and racist in his views. He was connected to activities by loyalists, including terrorism, from the early days of the Troubles. Although not named, Campbell was often referred to as "The Pastor". He had a strong association with prominent paedophiles John McKeague and William McGrath. Later he was friends with convicted loyalist paramilitaries Clifford Peeples, in particular, and Kenny McClinton. These four associates of Campbell's have been named as British agents. Loyalist politician and UVF member George Seawright was also a close friend. With Peeples and McClinton, Campbell worked to undermine the fledgling Northern Ireland peace process that led to the Good Friday Agreement and power-sharing in Northern Ireland by smearing the political representatives of the loyalist paramilitaries, namely the Progressive Unionist Party (PUP) and Ulster Democratic Party (UDP). Campbell was instrumental in Billy Wright establishing the LVF, after his expulsion from the UVF for breaking the loyalist ceasefire. Former loyalist Roy Garland considered Campbell an expert in stirring up trouble via letter-writing and making bogus phone calls.

In his early 20s, Campbell sexually assaulted a boy and was put on trial before being acquitted in suspicious circumstances. Three years later he became the chief suspect in the paedophile murder of Belfast boy Brian McDermott in September 1973 but left Belfast very soon afterwards to start a degree course in London. One journalist has stated: "It’s important the public know the full story about this evil man", while a book refers to Campbell as a "child rapist".

== Early life ==
Joseph Alan Johnston Campbell was born in on 7 August 1949 to parents Joseph (a stevedore) and May into a staunchly Presbyterian, well-to-do home in Wheatfield Crescent off the upper Crumlin Road, a Protestant district of North Belfast where Roman Catholic families also lived. He spent much of his life in the north of the city. His grandmother was a firm adherent of the doctrine of British Israelism, and thus he was exposed to this teaching from an early age. Despite his upbringing, he did not convert to Christianity until 19 September 1965, in the Ravenhill Free Presbyterian Church, after listening to a sermon by Rev. Ian Paisley. He had first listened to Paisley in the latter's tiny gospel hall some years before. In the early 1970s, Campbell disavowed his affiliation to the Free Presbyterian faith for what he considered Paisley's weak opposition to Irish nationalism.

Because of his "Kingdom Identity" views (which hold that Israel, not the church, is the bride of Christ, in contradiction to the teachings of the Westminster Confession of Faith) and his acceptance of Pentecostal beliefs, Campbell left the Free Presbyterian Church and no longer promoted Paisley.

He left Belfast in September 1973 to study History at the University of London, where he graduated with a 2.2 degree in 1976. He subsequently received a certificate in Biblical Studies from Queen's University Belfast.

Although Campbell denied to fellow loyalist Roy Garland that he was homosexual, he claimed in a police interview that he was a celibate homosexual. Former unionist councillor John Carson had heard rumours about Campbell's homosexuality. Campbell's name came up in statements made by others about alleged unwanted homosexual advances towards young boys. In the late 1960s, he took a girlfriend as cover for his homosexuality. She later admitted that the relationship had never gone anywhere.

== Religious and racial beliefs ==
=== Preaching and Ulster ===
Campbell began preaching in May 1974 and delivered his first sermon on Bible prophecy on 24 September 1978. He was officially ordained to the ministry by Dr Francis Thomas on 18 July 1988. He was the author of a number of Bible study books and lectured throughout the United Kingdom, the United States, Canada and Australia.

His ministry centred in Ulster and many of his messages dealt with the political situation there. Amongst his best-known publications was Five Things Every Ulster Protestant Needs To Know, published by Open-Bible Ministries in 1997. In 1989, when he led Covenant People's Fellowship, Campbell opined that the people of Ulster possessed their own identity "separate from the so-called Irish identity that everybody's trying to foist upon us against our will", but that identity and heredity had become neither Irish nor English. Campbell also had contact with the Christian Assemblies International.

=== Lost tribes of Israel ===
Campbell, a "British Israelite", believed that the people of Ulster form part of the lost tribes of Israel taken into exile by the Assyrians. Further, his sermons on this subject taught his listeners that the Protestant people of Ulster and the white race in South Africa represent Israel's lost tribes. He argued that the hand of the Lord had seen a Calvinist race, descended from the people of Israel, settle in each place well over 500 years previously and form an ethnic nation. God's plan, he contended, is that each race has a special duty to convert non-believers and remain immovable in defence of the truth of the gospel.

Campbell, an outspoken Ulster-Israelite, preached about the movement of lost tribes of Israel through Western Europe. He considered himself amongst the third-generation of followers of the British-Israeli cause he espoused. In 1988, he observed that Ulster people had felt pressurised into feeling shame for their patriotic and loyalist views. British-Israelism, by contrast, rejects such teaching: "Britain is part of God's vineyard, Ulster is our own Promised Land, peopled by the very seed of Israel planted here as a light in darkest Ireland, and we must occupy until Jesus comes".

He was also a prominent figure in the Association of Covenant People, which teaches that Anglo-Celto-Saxon peoples can trace their lineage back to the Twelve Tribes of Israel. Reformed Evangelical Protestants decried Campbell's views on British Israel as being contrary to scripture.

In the late 1990s, the British Israel movement forbade Campbell from addressing any of its gatherings.

=== Anti-Catholicism ===
Campbell held fiercely anti-Catholic views and mentored "anti-Catholic sectarian bigot" Clifford Peoples. Campbell once referred to Catholics as worshipping a "wafer God" and used his website to disseminate such sentiments; he also authored a number of anti-Catholic pamphlets, including Rome Watch. Campbell once linked a protest to the ancient conflict between Protestant beliefs and the Beast of Rome. Critics of Campbell noted that he fomented opposition to Catholics. In August 2002, a unionist Catholic journalist noted that Campbell had referred to him as "that Romanist who writes for the Belfast Telegraph".

Campbell's website also recounted tales of Catholic clergy in various countries making the news for involvement in crimes of a sexual nature. The Church of Rome, he argued, was carrying out a jihad against the Protestant religion. He directed his ire towards Tony Blair on account of the Prime Minister's spouse being a Catholic. One commentator observed that Campbell had failed to draw attention to activities of that nature undertaken by the likes of McGrath or McKeague.

A flavour of Campbell's views can be seen in a sermon delivered in October 1985 at the Cregagh Pentecostal Fellowship in which he attacked all major tenets of the Catholic faith. In Campbell's opinion, there is no single Antichrist but, instead, it is seen in the entire succession of Bishops of Rome. In the struggle against the Antichrist, the soul of Ulster would be a key battleground.

Campbell likened the Harryville church protest to the historical struggle between the true believers of God's word and the idolatry of Catholicism. This was "a battle to the finish" to deny popery a devastating victory over Protestantism. Open Bible Ministries, led by "notorious anti-Catholic figure Campbell", was Ulster's primary British Israeli movement. Its theological and political focus was stridently Protestant and anti-Catholic in nature.

=== White supremacy and racism ===
Campbell opposed miscegenation. In a lecture in the US, he stated that the races had separate origins and distinct biblical destinies and that black people were the "beasts of the field" referred to in the Bible. In North America, he received a warm welcome from white-supremacist bodies including the Ku Klux Klan. Campbell supported apartheid in South Africa, was critical of unionist politicians meeting Nelson Mandela and called Desmond Tutu a "little black man". Campbell used his website to promote the views of his colleague Sheldon Emery, an author with white supremacist views. He also faced the charge of supporting racist opinions held by a South African colleague who argued that God did not want different races to be joined together; a Free Presbyterian minister charged Campbell with holding "abhorrent" views and with disseminating "racist and blasphemous" information. Former South African leader F.W. de Klerk was excoriated by Campbell for betraying white people to "black heathens".

Campbell employed terminology such as non-white Christians needing to keep to "their own little Negro Churches". In autumn 2003, Campell, who was anti-Islamic in outlook, told a gathering in London that the threat from Islam was not make believe. Campbell was a frequent contributor to the racist Euro Folk Radio.

== Political activities ==
=== Shankill Defence Association ===
In May 1969, Campbell was involved in the creation of the Shankill Defence Association. This organisation, led by McKeague, was the precursor to the UDA.

=== Protestant Unionist Party ===
Campbell was also an early member of the Protestant Unionist Party, established by Paisley in 1966. When it became the DUP, Campbell was one of that party's earliest members and became secretary to one of its branches.

=== Loyal Orders ===
As well as being a lifetime member of the Orange Order and Apprentice Boys, Campbell was cited as an authority on the Orange Order as seen through the publication Let The Orange Banners Speak. (Note: In his evidence to a parliamentary committee, Christopher Luke notes that this publication is "by Pastor Alan Campbell (published by, and available from, Open-Bible Ministries, P.O. Box 92, Belfast, BT5 7SA)". See 'Select Committee on Northern Ireland Affairs, Appendix 1'. Parliament UK, 23 March 2000)

=== George Seawright ===
Campbell attached himself to firebrand Shankill loyalist George Seawright, who came to prominence around 1980. He was also key in the re-establishment of the Ulster Protestant League under Seawright in early 1985. Campbell later wrote a book on Seawright after the latter's murder by republicans in 1987.

=== Drumcree protest and LVF ===
Campbell attended the protests at Drumcree in 1995-96, taking advantage of the gathering of thousands of loyalists and the high-profile nature of the protest to restate his uncompromising credentials. Another longtime fundamentalist preacher stressed that Campbell had never played a central role in loyalism, on account of his extreme non-biblical views, but had resurfaced at Drumcree.

Campbell was instrumental in Billy Wright setting up the LVF, after his and his brigade's expulsion from the UVF for shooting dead a Catholic civilian and thereby fracturing the loyalist ceasefire. Playing on the UVF's lack of enthusiasm for what was going on at Drumcree and, in particular, on Wright's evangelical Christian outlook, Campbell argued that a new organisation would be akin to "army of God" undertaking a holy war.

=== Paramilitary ceasefires ===
In summer 1996, Campbell, then chaplain of a branch of the Apprentice Boys named after Seawright, observed that the loyalist ceasefire had been a betrayal. He considered the IRA ceasefire insincere and a threat to unionist hegemony.

Three years later, an unknown group called the Nationalist Defence Force sent a bullet to Campbell, apparently as a threat to his life.

=== Good Friday Agreement ===
Campbell was viscerally opposed to the Good Friday Agreement. A "self-appointed pastor", Campbell was considered the "spiritual head" of a loose association of loyalist religious and paramilitary extremists that came together to fight the agreement and see the loyalist ceasefire break down.

On 24 April 1998, Campbell joined Peeples in speaking at a loyalist gathering in Antrim to protest at the Good Friday Agreement. During the rally, members of the crowd were heard to chant "Burn Fenians". A few hours later a Catholic man was shot dead in a nearby town by members of the LVF police believed were present at the protest meeting in Antrim. Campbell also joined other loyalists in a protest against the Ulster Unionist Party discussing peace moves in spring 1998. Following the Good Friday Agreement, Campbell urged a gathering in England to reject the forthcoming referendum and never to countenance the sharing of power or giving the Irish government a say in Northern Ireland. Ulster Unionist leader David Trimble was denounced by him: "He is to Ulster what De Klerk was to South Africa. He is the traitor of all traitors". Campbell continued to campaign for a referendum vote against the agreement.

Campbell was spotted paying a visit in early 2001 to his longtime friend Peeples, who was serving a ten-year term in Maghaberry jail for possession of weapons.

=== Orange Volunteers/Red Hand Defenders ===
Campbell, described as a "hate-filled bigot", was named as one of the founders of the Orange Volunteers, a "shadowy quasi-religious terror group" established to counter the peace process in and which engaged in attacks on Catholics and Catholic property. He was also closely involved with the Red Hand Defenders, a group with similar aims, writing a number of its press releases and offering biblical support for that group's murderous activities.

=== Harryville Church protest ===
Campbell was a participant in the loyalist Harryville Church street protests in Ballymena in the late 1990s.

=== Flag protests ===
Campbell participated in, and was photographed at, loyalist street protests in 2013 in Belfast city centre at a decision not to fly the Union flag each day over Belfast City Hall.

=== MI5 and agent provocateur ===
Both commentators and prominent political figures like David Ervine portrayed Campbell as an "agent provocateur", controlled by British intelligence, who inflamed passions among young loyalists. Journalist Henry McDonald, an authority on loyalism, opined that Campbell, while on the periphery of the loyalist agenda for many years, was one of a number of "false prophets" who would never get their hands dirty but rather persuade others to engage in a "brand of holy war" by stoking sectarian feelings. In that regard, Campbell advocated the use of weapons in defence of Ulster. Campbell, clearly identified as "The Pastor" who came and went as crises arose, may have been blackmailed to become a British agent or "puppet"; however, others went to prison for many years for acting on his words. Campbell's role in "dirty tricks" is seen in an arson attack on a Baptist church in Templemore Avenue on 1 April 1997. This outrage was initially blamed on Catholics from the nearby nationalist Short Strand. However, David Ervine confirmed three weeks later that it was the work of people connected to the LVF in an attempt to derail peace efforts. (Note: Campbell's boyfriend Stephen Clark, seen holding a "Trimble is a traitor" poster, was believed to have torched the church. See Sam Flanagan, 'A parable in pictures'. Psalm79, 12 September 2014)

Garland, a former member of Tara (a shadowy organisation Campbell never joined), described Campbell as being involved in anonymous letters and making nasty phone calls. While Campbell kept a low profile, his veneer of respectability, it was alleged, was destroyed by the extremist content of his online publications.

== Schoolteacher ==
Campbell held the post of head of religious studies at Newtownabbey Community High School in greater Belfast. The Newsletter, a unionist newspaper, noted that Campbell had faced questions over his role in loyalist material being disseminated online when a "respected RE teacher" was required to be sensitive towards what others believe. One newspaper had contacted Campbell's employers for those publications having encouraged sectarianism.

== Paedophile activities ==
=== Background ===
Campbell was a close friend of William McGrath and a frequent visitor to his house; John McKeague was another of his close associates. All three men were named as a member of the Belfast paedophile network controlled by British intelligence. He was the youngest member of this paedophile network and lived a "charmed life" as a "protected agent of the British state". Campbell was believed to be an important suspect in the disappearance of a number of boys in the Belfast area in the late 1960s and early 1970s. Unionist politician John Carson was allegedly aware that Campbell was believed to be involved in those of 1969.

Investigative journalist and author on the Kincora scandal, Chris Moore, believes "it’s important the public know the full story about this evil man", whom another author terms "a child rapist".

=== Indecent assault prosecution ===
On 3 November 1970, Campbell, aged 21, picked up a boy on public transport in Belfast city centre. He brought the child to Ross House, a complex of flats on Belfast's Shore Road. There he sexually abused the boy in the flat of his friend and fellow paedophile Ken Larmour who was in hospital at the time and had given Campbell a key to his flat. Campbell threatened to knife the boy if he ever revealed what had happened. At that time the victim was attending Bawnmore Boys Home and was later sent to Kincora Boys' Home, where he was abused by McGrath. Campbell was charged with gross indecency with a child but not convicted due to a fake alibi that was later withdrawn. Campbell had earlier sought advice from McGrath, and from Larmour who worked as a magistrates’ court clerk. Larmour coached Campbell on how to beat this charge: he advised Campbell to admit that he had brought the boy to the flat but to deny that anything untoward had taken place. Larmour was suspected of doctoring court papers to help Campbell escape conviction.

Despite Campbell's recollection that at the time he had been "a man clutching at straws in an emergency", when the matter came before a magistrate in Belfast in May 1971, the case was dismissed. Protestant Unionist Party councillor Margaret Miskimmin, who visited Larmour's flat with Campbell and others on 11 November 1970, provided Campbell with a bogus alibi. Miskimmin only retracted this evidence years later when she realised she could get into trouble for "telling lies to the police". It was recommended in August 1982 that Campbell be prosecuted for suborning Miskimmin and her husband to commit perjury, but the DPP ordered that no charges be levied against Campbell.

Although Campbell was prosecuted at magistrate's court level only, he was defended by leading QC and DUP co-founder Desmond Boal.

It is clear that discussion of the police's recommendations about prosecuting Campbell took place at ministerial level in London. In a document seen by the attorney-general, Campbell was noted as a member of the DUP who was still worshipping at Paisley's church at the time of the 1971 assault and that perjured evidence had led to his escaping conviction.

Detective Superintendent G.R. Harrison of Sussex Police, who investigated Kincora and related matters in May 1983 (the Terry Report), reported that the failure and "poor memory" of RUC Detective Chief Inspector Matchett to act effectively over Campbell having suborned a number of people over this prosecution supported press claims that Campbell was being protected.

Police records relating to Campbell were destroyed as required by operating procedures, while the evidential file against him was believed lost in a bomb attack. The 1971 prosecution being dismissed had no negative consequences for Campbell, who later obtained a teaching job at a secondary school.

Campbell asserted that this prosecution was a conspiracy on the part of the RUC "to shut me up". The court case was not reported in the local press.

=== Murder of Brian McDermott ===
Campbell was named as the chief suspect in the murder of Brian McDermott, a ten-year-old boy who disappeared from near his East Belfast home in September 1973. Campbell left Belfast very soon afterwards to begin a history degree course at the University of London. He is believed to have failed to disclose information about the boy's disappearance, and a former British Army officer is quoted as stating that Campbell deserved "very close examination" about this murder and similar matters. In a BBC interview c. 2020, former members of the RUC claimed that they had been told not to take Campbell into custody to be interviewed about evidence linking him to the boy's death. Therefore, he avoided arrest or questioning. Years later the BBC withdrew at a very late stage the showing of a documentary on Campbell's likely involvement in the McDermott murder.

== Church activities ==
=== Bethel Pentecostal Church ===
Campbell was one of those involved in an attempted ousting of Rev. John Hull, pastor of Bethel Pentecostal Church in Berlin Street off the Shankill Road, by Peeples and UVF Miami Showband killer John Somerville in 2005. Key to the dispute was Peeples’ promotion of Campbell’s Rome Watch publication. Pastor Hull was eventually restored as minister after the involvement of legal experts.

=== Closure of church ===
It was reported in December 2013 that Campbell's church had shut down. Campbell had been very ill earlier that year with kidney trouble. In his absence, financial difficulties and irregularities had led to Open Bible Ministries having to close. Campbell was put in the spotlight over assertions that a shady person connected to him had stolen over £20,000 in a twelve-month period. Campbell refuted these claims.

== Death and funeral ==
Campbell collapsed at his home in an apartment block off Belfast's Shore Road before an ambulance took him to hospital, where he could not be saved. He died on 11 June 2017 and was buried five days later at Roselawn Cemetery in the east of the city. His funeral service in north Belfast, presided over by Pastor Ken Davidson of Christ Encounters Tabernacle, was attended by approximately 40 mourners. Campell left more than £60,000 to his live-in carer Raffi (Albert Leca). Amongst tributes to Campbell was one from the Association of the Covenant people which noted that the "Irish Warrior", although very ill in recent times, had assisted their work. Other death notices included "Will be missed . I know my Redeemer liveth" from close friends Tommy Doyle and Lily Green and their wider families.
