= Colin Wallace =

British Army intelligence officer

- Born: June 1943 (age 82–83); Randalstown, Northern Ireland
- Military career
- Allegiance: British Army
- Service years: 1961–1975
- Rank: Captain
- Unit: Psychological operations
- Conflicts: The Troubles
- Other work: Management consultant - retired

John Colin Wallace (born June 1943) is a British former member of Army Intelligence from Northern Ireland, where he operated as a psychological warfare specialist. He refused to become involved in the Intelligence-led 'Clockwork Orange' project, which was an attempt to smear various individuals including a number of senior British politicians in the early 1970s. Wallace also attempted to draw public attention to the Kincora Boys' Home sexual abuse scandal several years before the Royal Ulster Constabulary intervened.

Wallace was wrongly convicted of manslaughter in 1981, for which he spent six years in prison, until 1987. The conviction was later quashed in the light of new forensic and other evidence that raised serious questions about the dubious nature of the evidence used to convict Wallace initially. The Court of Appeal heard that scientific evidence used to convict Wallace was false and that the Home Office pathologist involved in the case admitted that he had received it from an anonymous American security source. The journalist Paul Foot, in his book Who Framed Colin Wallace?, suggested that Wallace may have been framed for the killing, possibly to discredit the allegations he was making. This view was similarly expressed by Alex Carlile QC (now Lord Carlile), who later speculated that this may have been the motive not just for the alleged frameup, but also for murder.

== Early life ==
Wallace was born in Randalstown, Northern Ireland, in 1943 and educated at Ballymena Academy. He was initially commissioned into the Territorial Army in 1961, and later became a marksman in the Ulster Special Constabulary ('B Specials'). A former cadet officer in the Irish Guards, he was commissioned in 1972 into the Ulster Defence Regiment, part of the Regular Army, and was immediately granted the rank of captain. He became the Regiment's Psychological Operations officer. He was seconded to the New Zealand SAS before working for British Intelligence as a psychological warfare officer. During the early 1970s he ran the British Army's free-fall parachute display team in Northern Ireland, taking part in a variety of 'Hearts and Minds' projects. Several members of that team were also members of the Special Air Service (SAS) or the Intelligence Corps. In 1969, The Irish Guards Association Journal carried this reference to Wallace: "He is a great training enthusiast and is never happier than when he is on top of one 3,000-foot peak busily engaged in plotting his hop to the next one. He will eventually achieve great fame as he will, no doubt, be the first Brigade officer to visit RHQ without getting salute at the main gate - as knowing him, he will surely parachute in."

== Information officer ==
Wallace joined the Ministry of Defence on 15 March 1968 as an assistant information officer for the British Army at its Northern Ireland headquarters at Thiepval Barracks in Lisburn. He became an established information officer from 14 December 1971, and a senior information officer with effect from 27 September 1974, having first held this latter post on temporary promotion from 1972.

In the years following his appointment to the Information Policy unit, Wallace received high praise from the senior staff at Thiepval. In 1971, his annual confidential report concluded: 'This is an officer of the highest calibre. Totally dedicated to the Army, he demonstrates this by a devotion to duty that is truly remarkable.' The counter-signing officer scribbled underneath: 'I heartily agree.' In 1972, the Chief of Staff wrote 'Continues to demonstrate that his talents are of the very highest standard.' Wallace's former boss, Major Tony Staughton, confirmed that by 1973 he had twice recommended Wallace for the MBE, and could not understand how and why the recommendations were turned down. "I've never known such a deserving case," he told journalist Paul Foot.

In February 1975, Ian Cameron, senior MI5 officer attached to Army HQ Northern Ireland, wrote in a report on Wallace's role in Northern Ireland:

It cannot be disputed that Wallace’s position within the AIS (Army Information Service) was unique; he was very much more than the head of a section. Wallace was undoubtedly permitted considerable latitude in regard to the manner in which he presented these themes in the course of his briefings and he also participated in the dissemination of printed IP material. His views on IP policy were listened to and respected. As a senior member of the AIS staff (Grade I equivalent) he had access to classified papers about information policy. He was the AIS Ulster expert.

=== Clockwork Orange ===
In 1973 and 1974, Wallace was involved with an operation called Clockwork Orange. Wallace alleges that this involved right-wing members of the security services in a disinformation campaign aimed not at paramilitary organisations in Northern Ireland, but at British MPs. He was supported by a covert specialist military troop (possibly an SAS unit made up of specially-trained Northern Ireland personnel). This group was shrouded in secrecy. Journalists from foreign news organisations would be given briefings and shown forged documents, which purported to show that politicians were speaking at Irish republican rallies or were receiving secret deposits in Swiss bank accounts.

On 16 March 1976 the British Prime Minister, Harold Wilson, retired suddenly without any apparent reason. In the days leading up to his resignation there had been no hint that he was about to go. Two months later, on 12 May, Wilson invited two BBC reporters, Barrie Penrose and Roger Courtiour to visit him at his home at 5 North Street, near Parliament. He told the reporters that he believed members of MI5 had been involved in a plot to undermine his Government. He said that he had called in the head of MI6, Sir Maurice Oldfield, who told him that there was a section of MI5 that "was unreliable" and that he (Oldfield) was "going to bring it out". Wilson also said that he had called in the head of MI5, Sir Michael Hanley, who confirmed the existence within his service of a disaffected faction with extreme right-wing views. Later, the two reporters interviewed Hanley at his home and asked him if there had been talk of a coup to overthrow the Wilson Government in the mid 1970s. The former head of MI5 replied: "I think it is generally accepted. Yes".

On 19 May 1976, The Daily Telegraph published a story under the headline: "Campaign in US to smear MPs". The story claimed that "persistent efforts have been made in recent months to discredit leading members of the three major British political parties by planting derogatory stories about them in news agencies in Washington". One of the news agencies to be given such information said: "So far this year we have been offered similar matter about some eleven MPs, a Conservative, two Liberals and eight Labour".

In his book, Spycatcher, former senior MI5 officer, Peter Wright said:

Feelings had run high inside MI5 during 1968. There had been an effort to try to stir up trouble for Wilson then, largely because the Daily Mirror tycoon, Cecil King, who was a longtime agent of ours, made it clear that he would publish anything MI5 might care to leak in his direction. It was all part of Cecil King's "coup," which he was convinced would bring down the Labour Government and replace it with a coalition led by Lord Mountbatten.

But the approach in 1974 was altogether more serious. The plan was simple. In the run-up to the election which, given the level of instability in Parliament, must be due within a matter of months, MI5 would arrange for selective details of the intelligence about leading Labour Party figures, but especially Wilson, to be leaked to sympathetic pressmen. Using our contacts in the press and among union officials, word of the material contained in MI5 files and the fact that Wilson was considered a security risk would be passed around.

Soundings in the office had already been taken, and up to thirty officers had given their approval to the scheme. Facsimile copies of some files were to be made and distributed to overseas newspapers, and the matter was to be raised in Parliament for maximum effect. It was a carbon copy of the Zinoviev letter, which had done so much to destroy the first Ramsay MacDonald Government in 1924.

The information appears to bear a striking similarity to some of the material contained in the notes which Colin Wallace had been instructed two years earlier as part of the 'Clockwork Orange' project. People named in Colin Wallace's notes as having been targeted in this manner included Harold Wilson, Edward Heath, Merlyn Rees, Cyril Smith, Jeremy Thorpe, Tony Benn and Ian Paisley.

Despite repeated denials in more recent years by the heads of MI5, it is now clear that members of MI5 did make attempts to undermine Harold Wilson and his Government in the 1970s. The former Cabinet Secretary, Lord Hunt, conducted a secret inquiry into the allegations and, in August 1996, he said to journalist, David Leigh:

"There is absolutely no doubt at all that a few, a very few, malcontents in MI5... a lot of them like Peter Wright who were rightwing, malicious and had serious personal grudges – gave vent to these and spread damaging malicious stories about that Labour government."

On 20 March 1975, Hugh Mooney, a member of the top secret Information Research Department run by the Foreign and Commonwealth Office, wrote a memo to his superiors claiming that the former Head of Army Intelligence in Northern Ireland told him that Wallace "had been one of his best sources." MI5 accused Wallace of leaking information to the press about William McGrath, the leader of the Loyalist paramilitary group Tara, who had been sexually abusing children at the Kincora Boys' Home. However, official records later showed that he had been instructed by his superiors to draw the attention of the press to McGrath's activities.

Mooney also gave an interview to the Sunday Correspondent on 18 March 1990 about Wallace's attempts to expose the sexual abuse at Kincora. The Sunday Correspondent report said:

Mooney also admitted that Mr Wallace had told him about the above sex scandal at the Kincora boys home in Belfast - casting further doubt on Government claims that the security forces had no knowledge of the long-running rape and buggery of children in care. 'I do know he mentioned it. He was dropping it in and feeling his way. He kept pushing it. But I could never understand why. I thought it was totally irrelevant to our concerns. I did get the feeling he was pushing this.'

On 21 February 2019, Wallace wrote to the then Secretary of State for Northern Ireland, Karen Bradley MP, and provided her with documentary evidence that three of the official inquiries into the abuses at Kincora had deliberately misled Parliament. He also queried why the investigations had failed to interview key, identified witnesses from the Intelligence Services. p

== After HQNI ==
Wallace resigned from the Ministry of Defence in 1975 in order to avoid disciplinary action, ostensibly for privately briefing journalists with classified information. Wallace always claimed that this action was consistent with his secret duties as a member of the Intelligence Services and that the real reasons for his dismissal were related to his refusal to continue working on the Clockwork Orange project in October 1974, and his exposure of a child abuse scandal at the Kincora Boys' Home. He claimed his allegations were blocked because the leading perpetrator was both a leading member of a loyalist paramilitary group and an undercover agent for MI5. The government later admitted that Wallace had the authority to take decisions on the release of classified information in support of psychological operations.

In the 1980s, to support his claims, Wallace produced a collection of documents, including a series of handwritten notes on material which formed part of the Clockwork Orange project. The notes were later subjected to an independent forensic analysis by Dr Julius Grant, and the results were consistent with the notes having been made contemporaneously during the 1970s.

Wallace was probably the first member of the security forces to attempt to draw public attention to the sexual abuse of children at the Kincora Boys' Home in East Belfast. In 1973, at the request of his superior officers, he gave several journalists the name of the loyalist paramilitary leader running the home, together with his address and telephone number. He also pointed out that the man was "a known homosexual" who blackmailed people into homosexual activities which he himself initiated. On 19 July 1976, the New Statesman published a story by Robert Fisk of The Times and based on Wallace's allegations about the sexual allegations surrounding William McGrath, one of the Kincora staff. Although Wallace's superiors later confirmed that they had authorised Wallace to disclose that information, a senior MI5 officer, Ian Cameron, accused Wallace of a breach of security. MI5 later refused to allow the police to question Cameron about Kincora.

None of the newspapers he briefed published the story and the abuse of children continued unabated for several years before the police were finally forced to take action following revelations in the Irish Independent. In his report, published on 20 January 2017 into the Kincora Boys Home sex scandal, Sir Anthony Hart was highly critical of the disciplinary procedure initiated by the MoD against Colin Wallace in 1975. He said:

“411 We consider that the fact that National Security was involved did not excuse the approach that was taken (by the MoD).

412 What happened in this instance was that the processes of the Board were deliberately interfered with by the Ministry of Defence in order to ensure that the outcome of Mr Wallace’s appeal was unsuccessful. We criticise all of those involved in what occurred in the strongest terms. Mr Wallace’s observation in his letter to the Inquiry of 9 September 2016 that the outcome of the Inquiry was “rigged” was entirely justified.”

(HIA Inquiry Volume 9. Kincora Boys' Home Part 2 - pages 150 and 151 paras 411 and 412)

Several commentators have pointed to the coincidence that the events which led to Wallace being wrongly convicted of manslaughter took place shortly after Kincora was finally exposed in the Irish Independent.

Writing in the New Statesman in 1986, Duncan Campbell said that, at about the time Wallace was charged with manslaughter, intelligence officers wrote to Sir Frank Cooper, Permanent Under Secretary of State at the Ministry of Defence, warning him that "Wallace had both the information and the motivation to reveal the story behind Kincora".

Entries in intelligence notebooks kept during 1974 by former Special Military Intelligence Unit Officer, Captain Fred Holroyd, who had met Wallace in Northern Ireland at that time, refer to the Kincora hostel by name, and say of leading Protestant politicians that they are "all queers", as British Army and RUC intelligence officials had had no difficulty coupling information about homosexual Protestant extremist politicians to Kincora. Holroyd is also quoted as saying that, while being trained for his Northern Ireland duties, he was told that the Tara organisation was in effect controlled by British intelligence, and was not a real security threat, implying that William McGrath, a former house-father at Kincora and leader of Tara, had come under intelligence control before 1973.

Clive Ponting, a former senior official in the Ministry of Defence, told the Sunday Times that he had attended meetings with MI5 officers at the MOD to discuss how to prevent Wallace and Holroyd from making allegations about 'dirty tricks' in Northern Ireland. Ponting said that MI5 were "genuinely worried about what Wallace might say".

In March 1987, a former MI5 agent, James Miller, told the Sunday Times that he knew Wallace when he was working in Northern Ireland during the 1970s. Miller said that his first task for MI5 was to spy on McGrath. He said that his MI5 handler told him to leave McGrath to them (MI5) and he understood that "they used his information to recruit McGrath as an informer."

After the Kincora story was initially exposed in the press, the Northern Ireland Secretary, James Prior, asked Sir George Terry, the Chief Constable of the Sussex Police, to carry out an investigation into the affair. Terry's full report was never shown to Parliament. In a summary of the report, Terry said: "Military sources have been frank, and I am satisfied there is no substance to allegations that Army intelligence had knowledge of homosexual abuse at Kincora." This inexplicable conclusion almost certainly misled the British Parliament. Moreover, Terry failed to inform Parliament that MI5 had refused to allow one of their senior officers, who had blocked prior military investigations into Kincora, to be questioned by his investigators.

It was, therefore, no surprise that Members of the Northern Ireland Assembly ridiculed the report. John Cushnahan, a spokesman for the non-sectarian Alliance Party of Northern Ireland, was indignant: he found one of the most disturbing aspects of Terry's conclusions was the complete dismissal of any possibility that military circles knew about the scandal. He then referred to a number of people as having been interviewed by British Army people for British military intelligence about McGrath and Kincora. Cushnahan concluded by saying that it was misleading and blatantly dishonest for Terry to claim that the whole matter had been fully ventilated.

Despite the obvious and unexplained weaknesses of the Terry Inquiry, Prior told Parliament that a 1921 Act Inquiry was not justified. Instead, Prior proposed to establish a public inquiry under the powers contained in article 54 of the Health and Personal Social Services (Northern Ireland) Order 1972 to examine the administration of Kincora and of young people's hostels in Northern Ireland. That inquiry would be led by a retired circuit judge, Judge William Hughes and it was decided that "It will be up to the Inquiry and the eminent judge who will preside over it to examine anything which is relevant to the particular boy's home (Kincora), or to the other five boys' homes, and the circumstances which led up to the problems." When asked on The World at One (BBC Radio 4, 18 January 1984) if the inquiry would take evidence on the alleged activities of the intelligence agencies, Prior replied that if there was any evidence, it would.

Despite these assurances given by Prior, Judge Hughes made it clear in his report: "The conduct of the police, or elected representatives, or clergymen, or military intelligence or any other persons who may have been in receipt of allegations, information or rumours relating to Kincora or any other home, was not under scrutiny in this Inquiry." Wallace's evidence was, therefore, excluded from the Hughes Inquiry.

In July 2014, Exaro News reported that the late Lord Havers, as Attorney General in 1984, limited the terms of reference for the Inquiry to exclude politicians and other key categories of people from investigation.

In 1974, Wallace's Army Annual Confidential Report described his performance in Northern Ireland as "outstanding" and said that he had made "one of the most effective personal contributions of any to the standing and reputation of the Army in these troubles." The report was signed by the Commander Land Forces, Northern Ireland, Major General Peter Leng.

Later that year, Wallace was promoted to Senior Information Officer and, shortly afterwards, he wrote a lengthy memorandum to his superiors complaining that no action was being taken to stop the sexual abuse of children at the Kincora Home. A few weeks later he was removed from his job on the grounds that his life "was in danger", and posted to an Army HQ in England.

Former BBC journalist, Martin Dillon, who has written several books on the Northern Ireland conflict, says:

One of the ghastly aspects of what became known as 'The Kincora Scandal' was that McGrath and [John] McKeague (another Loyalist paramilitary paedophile), as Intelligence assets, were agents of the State. What Wallace was unaware of was that McGrath and McKeague had virtual immunity from prosecution because of the information they were supplying to their Intelligence bosses. According to Chris Moore's (another BBC journalist) investigations of McGrath, MI5 was the organisation that recruited and funded his political activities. They were fully aware of contacts he made with Rhodesian and South African Intelligence in order to acquire arms for Loyalists.

Chris Moore summed up the situation succinctly:

McGrath made it obvious to all those who heard him speak that he was acting on Intelligence. There was a higher authority; McGrath was not alone. Figures like John McKeague spring to mind, and there are other documented episodes like the Colin Wallace affair and the case of Brian Nelson to suggest strongly that British Intelligence had penetrated and was manipulating the loyalist paramilitary underground from the early 1970s onwards. Where was the democratic control over all this unquestionably illegal activity? Why have elected representatives, including MPs from Northern Ireland itself, been so reluctant to become involved in uncovering the truth?

In 1980, David McKittrick of the Irish Times, reported how he had been briefed by Wallace "many times" during the 1970s:

It was clear that he had access to the highest levels of intelligence data. He had a encyclopaedic memory, which he occasionally refreshed with calls made on his personal scrambler telephone to the headquarters intelligence section a few floors above his office.

Peter Broderick, Head of the Army Information Services at HQ Northern Ireland in 1973, said:

To my knowledge, he (Wallace) worked at least 80 hours a week: coming to his desk every day. He lived in the Officers Mess and regarded himself as always on duty. On my arrival, I found that he had taken virtually no leave for six years. He had a knowledge of the Irish situation which was totally unique in the Headquarters and surpassed that even of most of the Intelligence Branch. As time progressed, he was not only the main briefer for the press, but also the adviser on Irish matters to the whole Headquarters and - because of his personal talents - contributed much creative thought to the Information Policy Unit. In order to do his job, he had constant and free access to information of the highest classification and extreme sensitivity.

=== Imprisonment ===
In 1980, shortly after the Kincora story appeared in the press, Wallace was arrested and subsequently convicted of the manslaughter of the husband of one of his colleagues. It was reported that Wallace had beaten antiques dealer Jonathan Lewis to death before attending a dinner party with the dead man's wife. Later that night, Wallace was alleged to have dumped the body in the River Arun. He served six years in prison, from 1981 to 1987.

The conviction was quashed in 1996 in the light of new forensic and other evidence. During the appeal hearing, a Home Office pathologist, Dr Ian West, admitted that some of the evidence that he had used at Wallace's trial had been supplied to him by "an American security source". The journalist Paul Foot, in his book Who Framed Colin Wallace?, suggested that Wallace may have been framed for the killing, possibly by renegade members of the security services in a bid to discredit his allegations about the Kincora scandal, and the fact that members of the intelligence community had attempted to rig the 1974 general election after which Harold Wilson came to power with a minority government.

Wallace himself suggested that Lewis had been murdered by 'rivals in the antiques trade' and that the police had suppressed evidence to that effect.

In June 1998, a former Special Branch officer who was familiar with the Wallace case wrote to Paul Foot saying:

I sincerely believe that Colin Wallace was 'fitted up' by corrupt members of the Establishment embarrassed by the events described in the early part of your book. I do not suggest for a moment that any Sussex Police officer involved in this enquiry was corrupt, because I do not believe they were, but I feel there was a hidden agenda, and that the senior officers knew a lot more about the matter than they would ever care to reveal.

As the controversy over the Kincora affair gathered momentum, Alex Carlile QC (now Lord Carlile), the SDP–Liberal Alliance's Legal Affairs spokesman, issued a statement saying: "It is clear that Colin Wallace, a principled man, knew too much about the Kincora Boys' Home scandal."

Two months later, Mr Carlile was quoted in the Sunday Today newspaper saying:

I believe there are many people in high places and within the security services who feel ill-will towards Wallace for exposing their activities. The question is that if MI5 was prepared to kill to get even with Wallace, why not kill him? It may be that Wallace's allegations about MI5 officers being involved in activities verging on the treasonable were widely known - so if any harm came to him the finger would point directly at them. I have tried repeatedly in the House to get an adjournment on the conviction and will continue to do so."

In 1987, a former senior Ministry of Defence official, Clive Ponting, was quoted on Channel 4 News about high-level meetings he had taken part in with MI5 officers regarding Wallace's case.

There was never any suspicion that Wallace was making these stories up or that it was totally unfounded and very easy to rubbish. It was very much a matter that, OK the story was being contained at the moment because he was in jail, but that in a few years' time he would be back out again and could be expected to start making the allegations again and then that would be a serious problem.

=== After Dark ===
In 1987 Wallace appeared on the first programme of the Channel 4 discussion series After Dark alongside Clive Ponting, T. E. Utley, Peter Hain and others.

=== Government re-examination ===
On 12 December 1989, the then Defence Secretary, Tom King, wrote a memo, classified 'Secret', to Prime Minister Margaret Thatcher regarding an internal MoD investigation which examined the nature of Wallace's clandestine role in Psychological Operations in Northern Ireland.

That investigation, initiated by Sir Michael Quinlan, the then PUS at the Ministry of Defence, found that Government Ministers had misled Parliament on a number of occasions when answering questions about Wallace and his role in what is referred to as 'the dirty war'. Instead of publishing the findings of the MoD's own investigation, King suggested to Thatcher that the Government should create another, much more limited and less damaging, inquiry to explain away why Parliament had been seriously misled for a period of years.

In his memo, King said:

Mr David Calcutt QC, the Master of Magdalene College Cambridge, has carried out a previous sensitive inquiry most satisfactorily and, if you agree, I would approach him to see if he would be willing to undertake this investigation. I am confident that we could rely on him to approach these very sensitive issues with complete discretion. It would be important to restrict his terms of reference to that handling of Mr Wallace’s CSAB appeal, so that he could avoid getting drawn into Kincora, 'Clockwork Orange', assassinations etc. I envisage that his recommendations and my subsequent decision should be published; but that Mr. Calcutt should not make a published report.

When King announced the setting up of the Inquiry by Calcutt, he was strongly challenged by MPs on all sides of the House, including Nationalist and Unionist politicians from Northern Ireland. For example, Jim Marshall (then deputy shadow spokesman on Northern Ireland) challenged Tom King saying:

The argument that we are seeking to put to the Secretary of State and to get him to accept is that, if there is evidence that Mr. Wallace has been telling the truth in this particular, there may well be validity in his general arguments and points. Therefore, for that reason if no other, there is a need for a far wider-scale inquiry than is being proposed at present. The Secretary of State must know that the piddling little inquiry that he has set up is to determine whether Mr. Wallace was fairly or unfairly dismissed in the light of the new evidence - but that just will not do.

In a letter to Terence Higgins MP on 30 January 1990, Prime Minister Margaret Thatcher referred to earlier statements made by Government Ministers about the Wallace case and said:

I regret to say that a re-examination of departmental papers has brought to light information which shows that there were a number of statements in my letters, and in other Ministerial statements and official correspondence, which were incorrect or require clarification.

Later that same day, in the House of Commons, the Government made a very limited admission that Ministers had "inadvertently misled" Parliament over Wallace's role and confirmed that he had been involved in disinformation activities on behalf of the security forces and that he had been authorised to supply, on occasions, classified information to journalists. As King had suggested to Thatcher in his memo of 12 December 1989, that account fell far short of any admission regarding the abuses of children at Kincora, 'Clockwork Orange', or other really contentious issues such as attempts to discredit leading politicians during the 1974 General Elections.

The Armed Forces Minister, Mr Archie Hamilton admitted that several key allegations consistently made by Wallace were in fact true.

Papers which have now come to light indicate that, when the case was made to establish Mr. Wallace's post, it was proposed that its duties should include responsibilities for providing unattributable covert briefings to the press; and it was stated that the incumbent would be required to make on-the-spot decisions on matters of national security during such interviews. It seems that, in the event, the arguments for including these responsibilities in Mr Wallace's job description were made orally rather than in writing to those who approved the establishment of the SIO post. But presumably Mr. Wallace was told what duties he was expected to carry out; and indeed it would appear that he had already been undertaking unattributable briefing activities of this kind, which may have included disinformation.

The inquiry undertaken by Calcutt confirmed that Wallace had, indeed, been working for the intelligence services during the 1970s and that his enforced resignation from the Ministry of Defence had been made on the basis of a false job description designed to conceal his covert role in psychological warfare. Calcutt also found that members of MI5 had manipulated the disciplinary proceedings taken against Wallace. In the light of the inquiry's findings, Wallace was awarded compensation by the Government. Although King had informed Thatcher that part of Wallace's role not only involved the dissemination of intelligence, but also the gathering of intelligence, and was described by the former heard of Army Intelligence in Northern Ireland as one of his "best sources", there was no mention of that critically important fact in Archie Hamilton's statement to Parliament.

Wallace's solicitor, Jim Nicol, referred Calcutt's report to the Metropolitan Police Commissioner, on the basis that the conclusions indicated that Security Service officers who manipulated the proceedings had attempted to defraud Wallace. The Metropolitan Police referred the matter to the Director of Public Prosecutions (DPP) for guidance. The DPP concluded that it would not be in the public interest for the police to pursue the matter.

Despite the findings of the Calcutt Inquiry, the Ministry of Defence refused to allow the Defence Select Committee to have access to Wallace's secret job description. In a letter dated 11 February 1991, the Ministry of Defence said that Wallace's job description contained "sensitive information relating to the security and intelligence matters" and that the provision of such papers, even under the conditions relating to the committee's access to classified information, "would be inconsistent with the conventions"

=== Dublin-Monaghan bombings inquiry ===
Evidence from Wallace was used by the Barron Report, an Irish government inquiry into the 1974 Dublin and Monaghan bombings.

A letter from Wallace to Tony Staughton, the Chief Information Officer of the Army Information Service at Lisburn, on 14 August 1975 noted the connections between Ulster Volunteer Force (UVF) paramilitaries and the Intelligence Corps and RUC Special Branch:

There is good evidence the Dublin bombings in May last year were a reprisal for the Irish government's role in bringing about the [power sharing] Executive. According to one of Craig's people [Craig Smellie, the top MI6 officer in Northern Ireland at the time], some of those involved, the Youngs, the Jacksons, Mulholland, Hanna, Kerr and McConnell were working closely with SB [Special Branch] and Int [Intelligence] at that time. Craig's people believe the sectarian assassinations were designed to destroy [then Northern Secretary Merlyn] Rees's attempts to negotiate a ceasefire, and the targets were identified for both sides by Int/SB. They also believe some very senior RUC officers were involved with this group. In short, it would appear that loyalist paramilitaries and Int/SB members have formed some sort of pseudo-gangs in an attempt to fight a war of attrition by getting paramilitaries on both sides to kill each other and, at the same time, prevent any future political initiative such as Sunningdale.

In a further letter dated 30 September 1975, Wallace revealed that MI5 was trying to create a split in the UVF in order to foment violence:

because they wanted the more politically minded ones ousted. I believe much of the violence generated during the latter part of last year was caused by some of the new Int people deliberately stirring up the conflict. As you know, we have never been allowed to target the breakaway UVF, nor the UFF, during the past year. Yet they have killed more people than the IRA!

In December 2003, the Dáil's Joint Committee on Justice, Equality, Defence and Women's Rights, published the Report of the Independent Commission of Inquiry into the Dublin and Monaghan Bombings which took place in May 1974. The Inquiry was led by a former Irish Supreme Court Judge, Mr Justice Henry Barron. Barron interviewed Wallace on a number of occasions during the Inquiry and comments:

In person, Wallace comes across as intelligent, self-assured, and possessed of a quiet yet unwavering moral conviction. Though he has reasons enough to be bitter - the abrupt and unjust ending of a promising career in Northern Ireland, five years spent in prison on a conviction which has since been quashed - he displays no outward signs of resentment towards individuals or institutions. He remains intensely loyal to his country and to the Army: insofar as he has a quarrel, it is with individuals rather than the institutions concerned. He says he believes that much of the propaganda work undertaken by Information Policy was justifiable in the interests of defeating subversives and promoting a political solution to the Troubles. When speaking of matters directly within his own experience, the Inquiry believes him to be a highly knowledgeable witness. His analyses and opinions, though derived partly from personal knowledge and partly from information gleaned since his time in Northern Ireland, should also be treated with seriousness and respect.

Barron also refers to what he calls "the dubious nature of his (Wallace's) conviction for manslaughter in 1981", and points out that the "conviction was quashed on 21 July 1996."

In his book, Inside Intelligence, former SIS officer Anthony Cavendish confirms that he knew Wallace and says that his story is "frightening and disquieting, but one which ties in with many events to which I have been privy". Cavendish sent Wallace a first edition of his book which contains the following inscription: "Colin - a great help and a true friend."

Cavendish, a close friend over many years of Sir Maurice Oldfield, former Chief of the Secret Intelligence Service, says that Wallace's assertion that Oldfield was the target of a black propaganda campaign by MI5, "match closely details which were told to me privately by Maurice."

The black propaganda campaign against Maurice started in 1972, increased the year later when he became Chief of MI6 and was reinforced with a vengeance in 1979 when it became known that he was to be the new Security Supremo for Northern Ireland. In Maurice's view it was undoubtedly the pressure of increasing in-house rivalries and the danger it was causing which caused Thatcher to ask him to come out of retirement and reorganize from scratch the whole intelligence empire in Northern Ireland.

In his biography of Oldfield. Richard Deacon [Donald McCormick] writes:

Who were Oldfield's enemies? Who wanted to hound him even in retirement and, if possible, to destroy him totally? These were questions which I felt it imperative to try to answer. I tried to track down the source of these various stories which became embroidered as time passed, but there was nothing positive one could go on other than word of mouth gossip. My information is that the first report came not from the IRA, but from an undisclosed Ulster Defence Regiment source. Later sources suggested the stories came from inside the British Army.

The intelligence world in which Wallace operated in Northern Ireland was graphically described by Lord Stevens, former Commissioner of the Metropolitan Police. Stevens had presided over the Stevens Inquiries into collusion between the security forces and loyalist paramilitaries in the murders of Irish nationalists. In May 2011, he gave evidence to the Joint Committee on the Draft Detention of Terrorist Suspects (Temporary Extension) Bills and said:

When you talk about Intelligence, of the 210 people we arrested, only three were not (Intelligence) agents. Some of them were agents for all four of those particular organisations (Army, MI5, MI6 and Special Branch), fighting against each other, doing things and making a large sum of money, which was all against the public interest and creating mayhem in Northern Ireland. Any system that is created in relation to this country and Northern Ireland has to have a proper controlling mechanism. It has to have a mechanism where someone is accountable for what the actions are and that has to be transparent.

=== The Man Who Knew Too Much ===
In 2020 a documentary was produced on the life of Colin Wallace, The Man Who Knew Too Much. As of 2021 this film was available on YouTube.

== Summary ==
To this day, Wallace's full role on behalf of the Army remains a mystery. Former members of the Special Forces admit that Wallace worked with them as far afield as Berlin and the Oman during the Cold War, but the Ministry of Defence and the Intelligence Services still try to distance themselves from what Wallace was doing in Northern Ireland. He had been part of the Army team preparing for the Widgery Tribunal into the Bloody Sunday killings of protesters in Derry, and in 2002 he testified at the Saville Inquiry into the events.

One of Wallace's close friends in the Army described him as follows: "I played golf with the General. That was an accident. Colin was needed by the General. Everyone needed him. They just could not do without him."

Lieutenant-Colonel Tony Yarnold, who worked with Wallace in Northern Ireland, said: "Let's face it, Colin was the lynchpin of the whole operation. He was terrific - way ahead of us all in his knowledge and his readiness to work. Everyone wanted him all the time, and somehow he was always available."

A former Ministry of Defence Chief Information Officer commented: "For loyalty and dedication to the Army, Colin Wallace was in a class of his own. I just cannot conceive of any situation in which he would act maliciously against the interests of the Crown or the Army."

== Bibliography ==
- Foot, Paul (1989). Who Framed Colin Wallace. Macmillan, London. ISBN 0-333-47008-7. "Original from the University of Michigan, Digitized 16 Oct 2008, 306 pages, with online snippet view"
  - alternative edition: Foot, Paul (1990). Who framed Colin Wallace. Pan. ISBN 9780330314466. "reprint, 480 pages, no online snippet view"
- Cavendish, Anthony; "Inside Intelligence" (1990)
