= Kenny McClinton =

Northern Ireland loyalist

- Born: 1947 (age 78–79); Shankill, Belfast, Northern Ireland
- Employer(s): British Merchant Navy; Ulster Defence Regiment
- Known for: Ulster loyalist, Christian pastor, Decommissioning of terrorist weapons/munitions (1998)
- Political party: Ulster Independence Movement
- Movement: Formerly Ulster Defence Association
- Criminal charge: Murder
- Criminal penalty: Life sentence

Kenneth McClinton (born 1947) is a Northern Irish loyalist and self-styled pastor. During his early years McClinton was an active member of the Ulster Defence Association (UDA/UFF) and was jailed for murder in the late 1970s. He was a close friend of Loyalist Volunteer Force (LVF) leader Billy Wright and was the main orator at his funeral following his killing by the Irish National Liberation Army (INLA) in December 1997.

== Early years ==
McClinton was born in the Shankill Road area of Belfast and raised initially in a Nissen hut. His father, a coalman, was an alcoholic and frequently spent time in prison. His parents' marriage broke up whilst he was a child and as a result of the ensuing poverty his mother moved around a lot with the children whilst McClinton himself spent three years in a Park Lodge State Welfare Home.

He left school in 1962 and briefly worked as a labourer before enlisting for twelve years in the Merchant Navy. McClinton was regularly involved in violence during his time away at sea and left the Merchant Navy with 200 stitches in his body from the knife fights in which he had participated. Following his return to Belfast McClinton found himself involved in further street-fighting until in 1972 he enlisted with the Ulster Defence Regiment (UDR). McClinton lasted only the six months basic training in the UDR, feeling that the regiment was too restricted in what it was allowed to do. In particular, he complained that he had to fill in sixteen reports if he shot at rioters. He was released from the UDR after hitting a sergeant over the head with a bottle, during a fight.

== Ulster Defence Association ==
McClinton joined the UDA after leaving the UDR and, with his military background, was soon added to the ranks of their Ulster Freedom Fighters (UFF), its branch responsible for committing violent attacks. He became commander of several UFF active service units and through these was involved in a series of what he later admitted were particularly brutal attacks. McClinton has refused to reveal any details of these events, despite admitting his involvement in this type of activity, as he has never been charged for them. After becoming a committed born-again Christian in the H Blocks, McClinton, led by his faith, wrote sixteen statements of full responsibility for very serious UFF terrorist offences, got the RUC/C.I.D. officers to the Maze Prison, and gave them the signed statements of guilt. These charges were sent to the Director of Public Prosecution with recommendations from Tennent Street RUC that there be 'no prosecution', since McClinton was already serving life sentences. This recommendation was accepted by the DPP.

McClinton was ultimately charged with two murders. In March 1977 McClinton murdered Catholic civilian Daniel Carville. The attack took place as Carville was driving his son down Cambrai Street, which links the Shankill and Crumlin Roads, on St Patrick's Day. During the failed second strike by the Ulster Workers' Council later that year, McClinton boarded a busand shot dead Harry Bradshaw, the Protestant driver of the bus. Following the killing, the UDA, unknown to McClinton, wrote to his widow Sheila Bradshaw, stating that they were sorry for the murder and that they believed her husband to be a Catholic. A ten-pound note was included with the letter. Following pressures from politicians frustrated that workers were ignoring the Paisley-led strike and using public transport to get to their workplaces - the UFF had ordered McClinton to kill a bus driver in order to take all public transport off the Belfast streets. All transport was taken off following this assassination.

Following this killing McClinton went to work on a plan to send hollowed-out books containing bombs through the post to IRA Brigade Staff targets. McClinton admitted in later life that at this time he wished to behead IRA terrorists and place the severed heads on the railings of the Shankill's Woodvale Park, in order to 'terrorise the terrorists', as was UFF policy. Jim Craig, however, began to fear that McClinton, with his extreme suggestions about murder, was becoming too dangerous and a possible rival to him as leader of C Company UFF . Therefore, he contacted members of the police he knew to give McClinton up to them.

== Arrest and imprisonment ==
On 29 August 1977 McClinton's home, 59 Roseleigh Street, off Rosapenna Street, was raided and he was taken into police custody, where he eventually confessed to the murders of Carville and Bradshaw. However, when he came to trial McClinton retracted his confession and changed his plea to not guilty, appearing in court naked in what he claimed was a display of contempt for the trial. He was convicted of both killings.

Initially held in Crumlin Road Gaol, McClinton's successive violent outbursts saw him transferred to the Maze Prison, where he went 'on the blanket' to protest for political status for politically motivated offences. He retained his reputation for violence in the Maze although he also took to writing poetry, which generally dealt with the theme of anger at his and other loyalists' incarceration when he felt they were simply supporting British rule through their actions against the IRA.

McClinton was tried at the High Court, Belfast, before a Diplock court chaired by Lord Justice O'Donnell in February 1979. He argued that his confession had been extracted under duress, but after seventeen days the judge found him guilty. Describing McClinton as a "ruthless cold-blooded assassin", he gave him two life sentences with a minimum of twenty years.

== Conversion ==
McClinton spent almost two years initially on solitary confinement for fighting the prison system. During the blanket protest he fought fifteen prison officers who beat him badly, hanging him upside down and kicking him until he could not breathe. Twenty-six serious injuries were recorded by prison medical officer Joe Martin and McClinton was given 22 days solitary confinement. After reading the prison-issue KJV Bible, on 12 August 1979 McClinton called upon God and told him that he believed His word - 'Whosoever calleth on the Name of the Lord, shall be saved' (Romans 10:13). As a result, McClinton became a born-again Christian. He announced his conversion, and his renunciation of violence, to fellow inmates the next day, a move which initially earned him scorn and saw his reputation pllummet. Seeking to change his ways, he undertook various programmes of study, obtaining a degree in criminology and social sciences from the Open University as well as years of correspondence courses in theology from the Emmaus Bible School in Liverpool.

During his time in prison, McClinton started his own Christian Fellowship and converted 24 inmates to evangelical Christianity, including Robert "Basher" Bates of the Shankill Butchers. However, eight of the converts would later drift away. According to McClinton, he and Bates even performed baptisms in a tub in prison. Many of those who converted to Christ at that dark time in the Maze Prison, are serving God, many of them as formally ordained ministers, pastors, bible-teachers and missionaries.

McClinton's conversion made him vulnerable to being used to spearhead an NIO/POA integration project, and in 1983 he was sent to work in a Compound 22 containing 40 segregated republicans. The experiment was abandoned on 24 March 1983 when McClinton, who had been ostracised by the republican prisoners for ten weeks, was attacked and buckets of boiling water were poured over his back. He was who beaten with hammers; and lengths of planed redwood. McClinton was taken to the prison hospital by prison officers who had, he believed, left him in a situation where they knew he would be killed by his enemies. McClinton had extensive burns and almost died. He spent three months in hospital and received extensive skin grafts and plastic surgery to his arm and back.

== Ministry ==
McClinton was released from prison in 1993 and was soon ordained as a pastor in a Missions Ministry by a Texas-based Christian Ministry presided over by Pastor Jack Hetzel. Even at this stage, McClinton was preaching fundamentalist Bible-based Protestantism.

Following his release, the "saved" McClinton became a regular on Northern Irish television discussing his conversion. He established Higher Force Challenge, a youth scheme that sought to initiate dialogue and positive interaction between Catholic and Protestant young people (18 to 25-year-old high-risk category). He initially returned to the Shankill, where he worked in a voluntary capacity for the Stadium youth project.

McClinton also established his own Ulster American Christian Fellowship to provide funding for his own ministry and preaching engagements in the USA. At one point he preached in President Bush's own home church at Highland Park, Dallas, and teaching young student pastors at Southern Methodist University (SMU).

McClinton holds three unaccredited postgraduate qualifications: a Master's in Theology (gained in 2002), a PhD in Philosophy, which he was awarded in 2003, and a further doctorate in literature – as submitted as accumulated studies and teachings in Bible Theology – which he was awarded in 2004. These are all from the unaccredited Birmingham-based European Theological Seminary and College of the Bible International. Believing, as most Bible-believing Christians do, in the complete separation of church and state - the Board of Governors of Christian Bible Seminaries have the right to examine the written thesis of students and pastors, and 'having fulfilled the requirements of the Governing Board and after due examination...' Students and Pastors can be '...admitted to the degrees...of this Seminary,' McClinton's further degrees, fulfilled at the European Theological Seminary, are legitimate degrees and recorded as written thesis at the library of same. McClinton has successfully participated in a number of Evangelical bible-teaching missions to America, until 9/11, after which he was refused entry due to his past. He continued on in India. In recent years he has taken missions to the Czech Republic. His five-module course in Basic Christian Homiletics has been widely used internationally in bible colleges, churches and mission-fields in America, India and Nigeria. He has been a born again Christian consistently.

== Return to political activity ==
After successfully negotiating resolution to a Maze Prison Riot in H Block 6, and at the behest of Secretary of State, Mo Mowlam - Billy Wright and his LVF group had fought the Prison Staff to a standstill, then placed a death threat on Prison Officers - the UVF tried to assassinate McClinton and his pregnant wife at their home in Brown square, Shankill Road area, and he sought to resettle outside Belfast. His wife, Wendy, born and raised in Portadown, desired to move back home. McClinton's friend, Billy Wright inviting him to Portadown. According to Wright's sister Angela, the Portadown loyalist leader had met McClinton in prison in 1977, and their friendship had been cemented by Wright's fixation with the Shankill, an area he regarded as the bulwark of loyalism. This was sparked by the Drumcree conflict which erupted in 1995 and which Wright sought to portray as a threat to Protestantism in Northern Ireland from Catholics. McClinton became a regular face at the Drumcree stand-off and was frequently in the company of the Orange Order leaders such as Harold Gracey on site. He also wrote poetry in praise of Billy Wright for the role he played in resolving the Drumcree conflict.

As well as his conversion to Christianity, McClinton also became an advocate of Ulster nationalism, endorsing the establishment of an Ulster Negotiated Independent State. McClinton joined the Ulster Independence Movement. He was a candidate for the UIM in the 1996 elections to the Northern Ireland Forum in West Belfast and in Upper Bann for the 1998 Assembly election. Like the rest of the UIM, McClinton was a strong opponent of the Good Friday Agreement and was involved in the unsuccessful "no" campaign.

McClinton became a close associate of Clifford Peoples, a Shankill-based former UVF member who was a leading figure in Families Against Intimidation and Terror.

== LVF ==
McClinton had been close personally to Billy Wright and was the main orator at the Loyalist Volunteer Force leader's funeral following his killing inside the Maze Prison by the Irish National Liberation Army (INLA) in December 1997. As a result, he served as a spokesman and mediator for LVF prisoners. It was McClinton that succeeded in calling a halt to the LVF slaughter of Nationalists in the wake of the Wright murder in the Maze.

McClinton served as the liaison between the LVF and John de Chastelain's Independent International Commission on Decommissioning (IICD), and has had the only success in VISIBLE DECOMMISSIONING of terrorist weapons Ulster society has ever witnessed (on public television screens, 18 December 1998). As a result of the initiative on 18 December 1998, nine guns, 350 bullets, two pipe bombs and six detonators were given to the IICD. Criticism followed, as many of the devices were crudely home-made or very old, including a Mannlicher rifle that had belonged to the original UVF. McClinton invited select journalists to watch the destruction of some LVF weapons. "it is a small, but significant... decommissioning of arms and munitions." (General Jean de Chastelain, IICD)

Although there was no indication of any direct link, McClinton's name appeared on a list of people issued by Johnny Adair's C Company of the UDA as part of an attempt to initiate a loyalist feud with the UVF. McClinton was listed along with Peeples, Jackie Mahood and the already murdered Frankie Curry as examples of dissident loyalists that C Company accused the UVF of trying to kill.

On 27 August 1997, the UVF had tried to assassinate Kenny McClinton and his wife at their home in the Shankill area. On 27 November, the UVF attempted to murder Mr Jackie Mahood at his Taxi Firm Office - he was shot a number of times in the head, but survived. On 27 December Billy Wright was murdered as he sat in a prison van waiting to go for a visit with his family. All these treacherous actions took place on the same 27th date of the various months in 1997. McClinton and his family endured over a decade of code red death-threats (1997-2007), and death threats from dissident Irish Republican groups. In 2005, McClinton was warned again by police that his name was on a UVF hit list after the organisation killed four men with LVF connections. Commenting on the alleged death threat McClinton told the Sunday Life newspaper "if I am killed by the UVF, then it is only an opportunity to meet the Lord, and I will accept that opportunity".
