= Ormeau Park =

Park in Belfast, Northern Ireland

Coordinates: 54°35′05″N 5°54′55″W

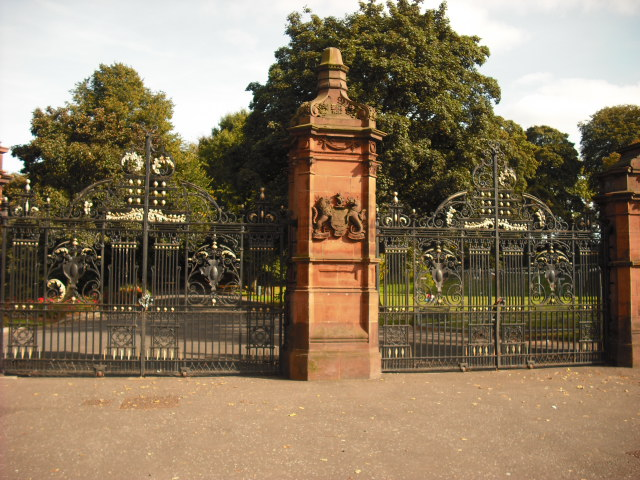
Entrance gates to the Ormeau Park, 2009

Ormeau Park is the oldest municipal park in Belfast, Northern Ireland, having been officially opened to the public in 1871. It is owned and run by Belfast City Council and is one of the largest and busiest parks in the city and contains a variety of horticulture, woodland, wildlife and sporting facilities.

The park is open daily from dawn to dusk. It features basketball, netball, soccer and tennis facilities, bowling greens, pavilions, car parking, cycling (and BMX track), ecotrails, horticultural displays, an orienteering course, a playground, seasonal bedding, specimen trees, and multiple walks. The park opens on to the Ormeau Road, the Ormeau Embankment, Park Road, and the Ravenhill Road. Access to Belfast city centre is available on Metro bus routes 7A - 7D.

== History ==
The land for Ormeau Park was formerly part of the Donegall family estate. It became their home in 1807, when the family moved to Ormeau Cottage from their town house in Donegall Place. The building was extended by George Chichester, 2nd Marquess of Donegall, who lived there until his death in 1844. Eventually the family was forced to sell the estate to pay its spiralling debt. In 1869, the area was purchased by Belfast Corporation and it was opened as a park to the public in 1871. The opening of Belfast's first public park was marked with a parade from Carlisle Circus through Belfast which attracted a large crowd and finished with speeches in the park.

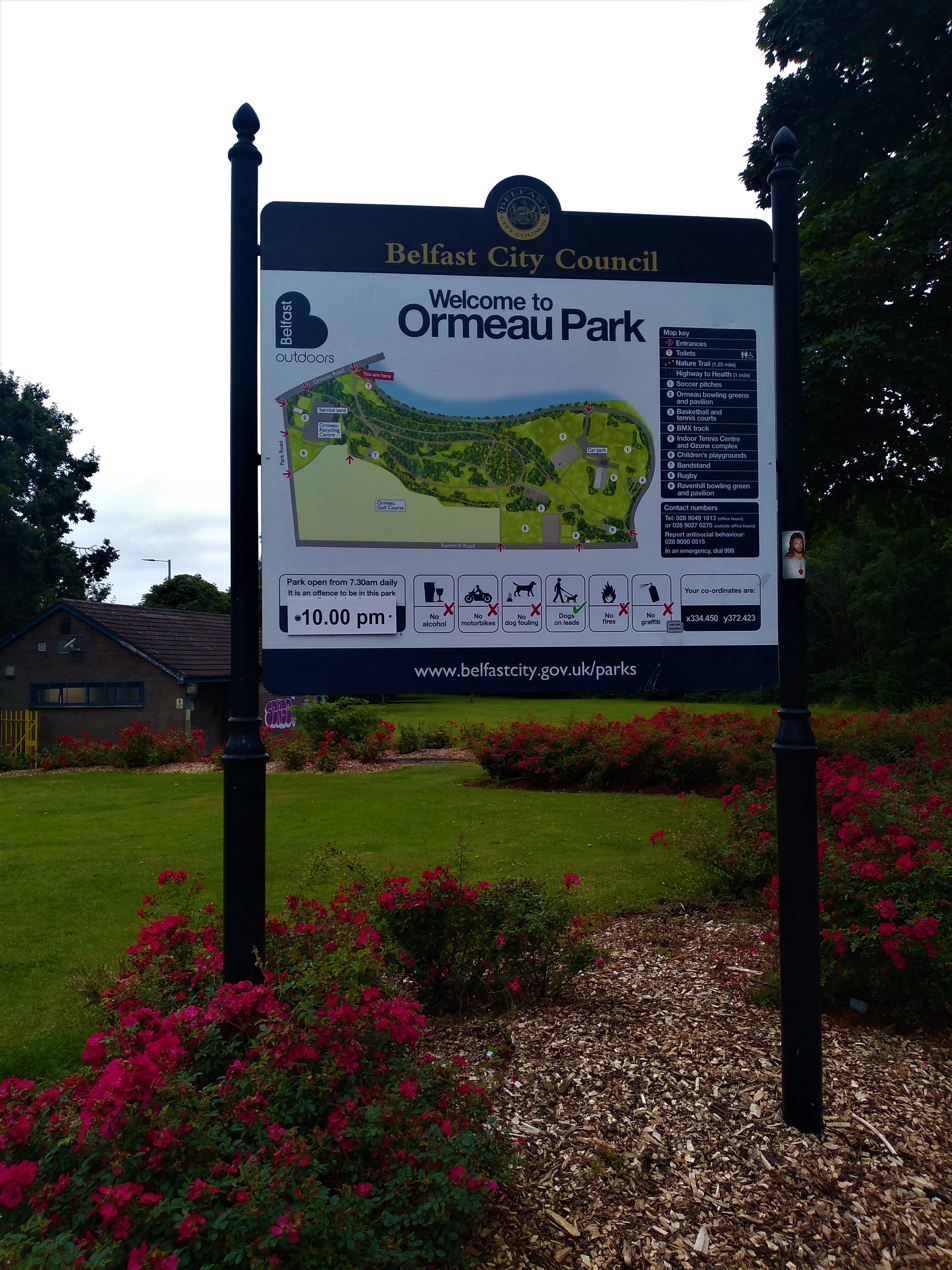
Ormeau Park, Belfast

The park was designed by Timothy Hevey, a successful young architect of the day. He won a competition for the best design for 100 acres (0.40 km^{2}) of parkland. The present-day park still roughly follows his design with several alterations. Some of the land is home to the 9-hole course of Ormeau Golf Club, and other nearby land near Ravenhill was laid out in playing fields. The embankment road cut off the river frontage of the park in the 1920s.

The park has been used for Orange gatherings on the Twelfth as well as other open-air events such as revival meetings. It was also the scene of the first meeting of the Ulster Vanguard on 18 March 1972 when William Craig called on his followers to attend following his decision to leave the Ulster Unionist Party. Joined by 100,000 followers Craig made a controversial speech in which he stated that "we must build up a dossier of the men and women who are a menace to this country because if and when the politicians fail us, it may be our job to liquidate the enemy".

In September 1973 the park was scene of a murder in which ten-year-old abductee Brian McDermott was dismembered and his body incinerated. The gruesome nature of the murder was such that local press speculated it may have been carried out as part of a Satanic ritual. However, according to B police files the killing had actually been carried out by John McKeague, a noted far right loyalist paramilitary and activist who was a leading figure in the paedophile ring at Kincora Boys' Home.

== Stadium plan ==
Along with the old Maysfield Leisure Centre site, Ormeau Park was one of two sites in that part of Belfast that emerged as possible alternatives to the Maze as a site for a new Northern Ireland stadium. A consortium advocating Ormeau Park as the best venue completed a feasibility study.

The proposed City of Belfast Stadium would initially have accommodated a capacity of 25,000 seats with the option to extend to 35,000 seats as required. The plans said that the site would not occupy any of the park land used by the local community but that it would occupy the site currently housing the Ozone leisure facility.

In 2007 the then First Minister Ian Paisley vetoed use of the Ormeau Park for this purpose and the plan was abandoned.

== Culture ==
The park hosted the Tennents ViTal festival for the first time in August 2007.
