= Clifford Peeples =

Northern Irish loyalist

- Born: 1969 (age 56–57)
- Political party: Ulster Independence Movement
- Other political affiliations: Families Against Intimidation and Terror
- Movement: Ulster nationalism
- Military career
- Paramilitaries: Ulster Volunteer Force; Loyalist Volunteer Force; Orange Volunteers (1999-2000)
- Conflict: The Troubles

Clifford Peeples (born c. 1969) is a self-styled pastor in Northern Ireland who has been associated with Ulster loyalism, for which he was convicted of terrorist activity and imprisoned. Peeples has been a member of the Ulster Volunteer Force (UVF), the Loyalist Volunteer Force (LVF) prisoners' spokesman and leader of the Orange Volunteers (OV). He has taken a prominent role in opposing the Northern Ireland Protocol in the courts.

== Early years ==
According to writers Henry McDonald and Jim Cusack, Peeples had been a member of the UVF early in his life. This is also confirmed by Steve Bruce. At some point, he was given security clearance for RAF Aldergrove. Peeples did not come to prominence, however, until the mid-1990s when he was an activist with Families Against Intimidation and Terror.

== Loyalist Volunteer Force ==
Peeples became close to another self-styled pastor, Portadown-based Kenny McClinton, who had formerly been a member of the Ulster Defence Association (UDA) before falling out with that organisation and joining forces with the UVF Mid-Ulster brigadier Billy Wright. According to McDonald and Cusack, Peeples and McClinton were also linked to a British intelligence agent known as "the Pastor". Together the three associates launched a propaganda campaign against the Progressive Unionist Party (PUP) and Ulster Democratic Party (UDP) through which they hoped to destabilise the nascent Northern Ireland peace process. McDonald and Cusack further claimed that Peeples, McClinton and "the Pastor" helped to convince Wright that establishing the LVF, after he had been stood down by the UVF leadership, would be beneficial in creating an "army of God" which would appeal to Wright's evangelical Christian beliefs.

== Political activity ==
Peeples was also involved in Ulster nationalist politics as a member of the Ulster Independence Movement. He was, along with McClinton, one of two unsuccessful candidates for the party in Belfast West in the 1996 elections to the Northern Ireland Forum, jointly securing only 43 votes (out of 42,000). In keeping with UIM policy, Peeples campaigned against the Good Friday Agreement and, on 24 April 1998, shared a platform at an Antrim rally with Democratic Unionist Party (DUP) councillors Jack McKee and Sammy Wilson. During the rally he set fire to a copy of the document whilst members of the crowd shouted "and burn Fenians too".

As a quasi-political figure he retained his links to the LVF. During an LVF hunger strike in the Maze Prison, he went into the jail to discuss the incident with the loyalist prisoners. His links to this dissident group did not go unnoticed amongst the more mainstream elements of loyalist paramilitarism, however. For a time he ran a flower shop on the Crumlin Road which was ransacked in 1997 in an attack that Peeples blamed on loyalist racketeers. Peeples was seen as a target by the UVF because of his association with the LVF and Wright. He then resettled on the Woodvale Road, Greater Shankill, where he began styling himself as a pastor.

== Orange Volunteers ==
A group known as the Orange Volunteers had existed in the early 1970s. However, the name was revived in late 1998 by a group of Protestant fundamentalists based in Stoneyford, County Antrim who launched a series of pipe bomb attacks on Gaelic Athletic Association halls and the homes of prominent Irish nationalists in County Antrim and County Londonderry. The group also carried out simultaneous arson attacks on many Catholic churches.

In 1999 the Royal Ulster Constabulary, using a bugging device, overheard a conversation between a local DUP politician and Peeples, who was briefly OV leader, in which the politician encouraged Peeples to attack local Irish republicans. Peeples defended the activities of the OV by arguing that they were "defenders of the reformed faith" and that the Roman Catholic Church was a tool of the Antichrist.

Peeples was assistant pastor at the Bethel Pentecostal Church on Belfast's Shankill Road when, in 1999, he was arrested for paramilitary offences and given a ten-year jail sentence after a pipe bomb and grenades were found in his car. It had been stopped outside Dungannon on the M1 motorway when the discovery was made, with his passenger, well-known loyalist, James McGookin-Fisher also arrested. Six months before Peeples had also been arrested after grenades were discovered in the church hall, but no charges were made.

== Prison ==
Having been replaced as leader of the OV, Peeples was disowned by the movement whilst on remand. In December 2000 he, along with Stuart Wilson from Glenavy and Alan Lynn from Antrim, was handed a death sentence by the new leadership supposedly for leading a "black propaganda campaign" against the group from prison. Although the precise nature of Peeples' transgressions were not discussed, an OV statement stated:

The Orange Volunteers believe Peeples is deliberately seeding dissent within loyalism. He has received three or four warnings to stop orchestrating a campaign of misinformation against the Orange Volunteer leadership from within Maghaberry prison. He chose to ignore those warnings. So too did Wilson and Stuart [sic]. That is the reason behind the death sentences.

Whilst in Maghaberry prison, Peeples was involved in two separate attacks on republican prisoners. He also led a prisoners' campaign in support of segregation, as republicans and loyalists mixed freely in the jail.

His close friend and mentor Pastor Alan Campbell visited him in prison in February 2001.

== Subsequent activity ==
Released from jail in 2004, he returned to Bethel Church and was installed a minister at Easter 2005 in a move that divided the church. Peeples distributed the anti-Catholic Rome Watch pamphlet. Pastor John Hull, who had joined in 2001 whilst Peeples was in prison, accused Peeples of bigotry. This led to the church breaking into two factions and legal action. Rome Watch was produced by Pastor Alan Campbell who shared his belief in British Israelism.

Peeples is married to Suzanne, who ran as an Independent Unionist in the Upper Bann constituency in the 2007 Assembly election, coming last with less than 0.2%.

Peeples was the official applicant in a court case launched from 2020–22 by Ulster loyalists against the British Government in respect of the Northern Ireland Protocol.

In early 2023, Peeples went to Ukraine to assist its people "in their hour of need" against Russia. In preparation for that trip, he was seen wearing battle dress and carrying a sub-machine gun.

Peeples was arrested in August 2024 in connection with police investigations into race hate riots.

In February 2025, Peeples lost a judicial review case in the High Court after a judge rejected it and noted that a Freedom of Information Act request would be a better preliminary and alternative remedy. The case was in relation to records of an encounter between the First Minister and Deputy First Minister with a Chinese diplomat, which Peeples claimed was part of a wider Executive policy of non-disclosure that violates the Ministerial Code. Peeples subsequently lodged a complaint with the Information Commissioner about this matter.

Peeples' home in the Glencairn area of the upper Shankill came under attack on 25 July 2025, when a petrol bomb was thrown through a window; loyalists are believed to be responsible.
