= Hugh Gordon =

Hugh Gordon may refer to:

- Hugh Gordon (British Army officer) (1760–1823), British Army officer who became Lieutenant Governor of Jersey
- Hugh Gordon (Australian politician) (1817–1895), Scottish-born Australian politician.
- Hugh Gordon (violin maker) (1794–1854), violin maker from Northern Ireland
- Hugh Gordon (parasitologist) (1909–2002), Australian veterinary scientist
- Hugh Gordon (Canadian politician), Canadian politician
