= Samuel McClelland =

Northern Irish loyalist

- Born: c. 1920; Northern Ireland
- Died: c. 1983
- Occupation: Paramilitary leader
- Organization: Ulster Defence Association
- Known for: First commander of the Ulster Defence Association (UDA)

Samuel "Bo" McClelland (died 10 May 1983) was a Northern Irish loyalist paramilitary who served as the Chief of Staff of the Ulster Volunteer Force (UVF) from 1966 until his internment in late 1973 and for a period in 1983 during the supergrass trials.

== UVF leadership ==
Following the imprisonment of UVF leader Gusty Spence for murder in October 1966, Spence remained de jure leader of the group but needed a stand-in leader on the outside. He chose McClelland for this role, and appointed him Chief of Staff or Brigadier-General of the Brigade Staff (Belfast leadership) largely because he respected him for his Korean War military service, Spence also being a former British Army soldier. McClelland had lied about his age in order to enlist in the Royal Ulster Rifles.

Like Spence, McClelland was also a native of the Shankill Road and had a reputation as a disciplinarian. He sought to continue Spence's work by keeping together the few UVF members left and slowly adding to their number. In keeping with Spence's ideals, he sought to lead the UVF as if it were a regular army, and based their internal structure loosely on that of the British Army in which both men had served. He shared with Spence a belief that the UVF should keep a small, tightly organised membership and as such did not compete with the burgeoning Ulster Defence Association (UDA) for either membership or public profile. Nonetheless, the late 1960s were characterised by UVF inertia, in part because as Officer Commander McClelland had little personal power and had to enact policies that he received from Spence when he visited him in prison.

== Tara ==
In an effort to access any weapons it might have possessed, and to seek possible political guidance, McClelland and the UVF infiltrated the loyalist movement Tara, and under his leadership the two groups associated on the Shankill. McClelland was even "commissioned" as an officer of Tara, although many in the UVF were uncomfortable with the group's insistence on emphasising a Gaelic cultural mission alongside loyalism. The relationship deteriorated in early 1971 when a number of people, including an unnamed unionist politician, contacted McClelland to inform him of Tara leader William McGrath's homosexuality and to claim that McGrath had only started the movement in order to "pick up" young men. Roy Garland stated that McClelland confronted McGrath about the allegations and at a stormy meeting burnt the Tara ledger containing the names of his UVF members and left their headquarters. By this time it had also become clear that Tara had little weaponry to speak of and few independent members and as such the link had become largely pointless anyway.

== Later years ==
McClelland was interned in late 1973 along with a number of other leading figures in the UVF. By this point, however, de facto leadership of the UVF lay with Jim Hanna rather than McClelland whilst he had been succeeded as Officer Commander by Tommy West.
