= William McGrath =

Northern Ireland loyalist (1916–1991)

- McGrath at an Orange march
- Born: 11 December 1916; Bleary, County Armagh
- Died: 12 December 1991 (aged 75); Ballyhalbert, County Down
- Other name: "The Beast of Kincora"
- Occupations: Preacher housemaster
- Employer: Kincora Boys' Home
- Organization: Orange Order
- Known for: Loyalist and anti-Catholic activist Paedophile activities
- Political party: Ulster Unionist Party
- Movement: Tara; Ulster Constitution Defence Committee
- Criminal charges: Gross indecency, buggery, indecent assault
- Criminal penalty: Four years imprisonment
- Spouse: Kathleen
- Children: 3

William Worthington McGrath (11 December 1916 – 12 December 1991) was a loyalist from Northern Ireland who founded the far-right organisation Tara in the 1960s, having also been prominent in the Orange Order until his expulsion due to his paedophilia. A house master in Kincora Boys' Home in East Belfast, in 1981 he was jailed for four years for paedophile activities at the Home.

== Early years ==
McGrath was born on 11 December 1916 near Bleary outside Lurgan. His was a Methodist family which moved to Earl St in the Sailortown district of Belfast. McGrath married his English-born wife Kathleen, who served at the nearby Worldwide Evangelisation Crusade, and the two set up home on the Antrim Road before moving to Finaghy. He was a member of the Orange Order and for a time acted as chaplain to the prestigious Fernhill Orange Lodge. McGrath was also a branch member of the Ulster Unionist Party and for a time a delegate to the party, although he did not take a prominent role in party politics.

Their house in Finaghy, a large mansion, was named Faith House and became the centre for the Christian Fellowship and Irish Emancipation Centre which they established in 1941, with rooms made available for young people to stay.

McGrath was married to Kathleen and their marriage produced three children: Worthington, Harvey Andrew and Elizabeth Jean Frances. In 1976, Elizabeth married her father's lieutenant Frank Millar; she and Worthington were married in Martyrs' Memorial Free Presbyterian Church with Rev. Ian Paisley officiating. Despite being married, McGrath was a homosexual, who engaged in what journalist Chris Moore calls "homosexual perversions" along with fellow homosexual paederasts Joseph Mains and Raymond Semple. Other homosexual paederasts McGrath was close to included Pastor Alan Campbell, John Young of Belfast City Council and Joss Cardwell, a unionist politician who took his life after being questioned by police about Kincora.

== Religious and political message ==
McGrath travelled widely throughout Northern Ireland preaching his religious message, which included hard-line Ulster loyalist principles. McGrath claimed that Northern Ireland was on the verge of chaos and blamed it on the Provisional Irish Republican Army's supposed turn to communism, which he saw as the enemy of Christianity. According to the Royal Ulster Constabulary (RUC), as part of his virulent anti-communism, McGrath made contact with clandestine religious groups in Eastern Europe and smuggled in Bibles and religious tracts for their use.

His message was also highly anti-Catholic, arguing for instance that the Pope had all nuns and priests as part of his private army and that the Society of Jesus was deliberately destroying Ulster Protestant culture. McGrath argued that until the 12th century Ireland had adhered to a local form of Celtic Christianity until Pope Adrian IV had decreed that Henry II of England should invade and force out the native church in favour of what McGrath portrayed as the decadent Roman church. On this basis McGrath added an all-Ireland dimension to his thinking that was at odds with the wider political circles in which he was to move. Amongst his early converts was Roy Garland, a young Shankill Road native, who claims that on their first meeting McGrath twice felt his leg and extolled to him the virtues of close relationships between men.

By the mid-1960s some of McGrath's closest followers, including Garland, had begun to meet at his 15 Wellington Park base, a well-to-do area of Belfast (McGrath having shifted operations there in 1960), along with several senior Orangemen in a group known as the "Cell". Clifford Smyth also became part of this cell and grew close to McGrath, stating that at the time he was attracted to his strong anti-Catholic rhetoric. The cell spearheaded a campaign of speeches to Protestant audiences, more political than religious in tone than McGrath's earlier talks, encouraging unionists and loyalists to turn away from the moderate Terence O'Neill and to lend their support to his most vocal political opponent Ian Paisley. McGrath and Paisley differed over the latter's regular attacks on mainstream Protestant churches for their liberalism but McGrath admired Paisley's mobilisation of men and became involved in his Ulster Constitution Defence Committee. Despite their political collaboration, McGrath was not a member of Paisley's Free Presbyterian Church of Ulster although two of his children were married in Paisley's Martyrs Memorial Church.

In 1966, McGrath produced a series of leaflets in defence of Gusty Spence, the leader of the recently formed Ulster Volunteer Force (UVF), who was on remand for the murder of two young Catholics. McGrath's leaflets alleged that both victims were active communists and claimed that the UVF had been established by members of the Official Unionist Party, with Jim Kilfedder named specifically as being involved. The leaflet was an attempt to both smear the mainstream unionist party and to deflect criticism from Paisley, who was at the centre of speculation linking him with the UVF. McGrath was not a member of any established branch of religion, with his evangelical group being independent, something Fraser Agnew put down to McGrath's unwillingness to be constrained by the rules of any organisation.

McGrath was secretary of the Christian Fellowship and Irish Emancipation Crusade (CFIEC) when he appeared with Paisley at a rally in July 1966: this organisation, based in Wellington Park, was a Tara front in which his son Worthington was involved. A CFIEC pamphlet on "Romanism" illustrates McGrath’s attitude to Catholicism: "an age-old threat to the fortunes and liberties of mankind". These publications also reflected its leader’s curious fixation with Ireland as opposed to Ulster or Great Britain, with headlines "For God & Ireland" and "A Nation Once Again" and imagery including a map of Ireland with no border and the Irish phrase "náisiún ar ais (a nation once again)".

== Tara and paramilitary links ==
In November 1966, McGrath reconstituted the Cell as Tara, choosing the name to reflect his belief in the Irish heritage of his politico-religious mission. The group, which endorsed British Israelism, sought to develop a network across unionism. With the UVF under the command of Samuel McClelland in the late 1960s, McGrath sought to forge close links between it and Tara. McGrath's link-up with the UVF saw his profile and that of Tara rise and by the summer of 1969 he had had to acquire a printing press to meet the demand for tracts, flyers and news-sheets. Although initially the two groups co-operated closely, a number of people contacted McClelland to tell him that McGrath was homosexual and that he was using the Tara-UVF link as a way to pick up young men. McClelland confronted McGrath who fiercely denied the allegations. Nevertheless, the relationship between the UVF and Tara was terminated and McClelland burnt the Tara ledger in which the names of his UVF men had been entered.

In 1969, McGrath paid Billy Hanna, later the commander of the UVF in Mid-Ulster, money for the formation of "vigilante groups" in Lurgan.

McGrath had influence over Charles Harding Smith and encouraged him to establish the Ulster Defence Association (UDA) in 1971, reasoning that the group could replace the recently disbanded Ulster Special Constabulary. A leaflet distributed amongst loyalists calling for vigilante groups such as the Shankill Defence Association and the Woodvale Defence Association to form into one "army", a document that effectively brought the UDA to life, was actually written by McGrath, according to Chris Moore. Moore further argues that McGrath's MI5 handlers had instructed him to write this document as they hoped to control loyalist counter-insurgency through the UDA. His influence in the UDA in its early years was, according to Dillon, demonstrated by the fate of Ernie Elliott, a leading figure in the early days of the UDA West Belfast Brigade who eventually was killed by another UDA member. Dillon argues that McGrath's secret service handlers implored him to launch a whispering campaign against Elliott, who had flirted with communism and had been rumoured to be seeking a rapprochement with the Official IRA, and that as a result McGrath circulated rumours about Elliott enriching himself from racketeering and illegal drinking dens, rumours that helped to bring about Elliott's downfall.

Although Tara was not active in paramilitary terms like the UDA and UVF, the group continued to exist during the 1970s and in 1974 McGrath even smuggled in a consignment of guns from the Netherlands for them to use in the event of a "doomsday" scenario, which he predicted was coming soon. McGrath also sought to build links with Rhodesia and even sent two members of Tara to join the Rhodesian Army. Further members were settled in South Africa where they would eventually become involved in securing a cache of weapons for the UDA and Ulster Resistance (although McGrath was not involved in this smuggling, which occurred after his imprisonment).

== Kincora House ==
In 1971 McGrath found employment as a housemaster at Kincora Boys' Home in east Belfast. Unionist MP Rev. Martin Smyth told police that there had been surprise at McGrath getting a job at Kincora, as he was considered a businessman not a social worker; a William Magowan of Belfast Corporation Welfare department had been key to this appointment. McGrath was one of two agents MI5 was running inside Kincora. A spike in the level of sex abuse committed at the home coincided with McGrath starting work there. Not only was he shielded by his paedophile bosses, Joseph Mains and Raymond Semple, but also by MI5. In this new role McGrath established the home as a centre of child sex abuse in which he and invited friends, including John McKeague, regularly raped several of the boys at the home. In the course of the investigation surrounding the scandal, McGrath was dubbed "the Beast of Kincora" and it was alleged he had contacts with prominent politicians and political personalities in England such as Sir Anthony Blunt, who was known to McGrath through their mutual friend Sir Knox Cunningham.

The investigation into the abuse began on 24 January 1980. During the investigations McGrath remained an important figure in his Orange Lodge, the "Ireland's Heritage" Lodge, and in October 1981 was re-elected as secretary, although by this stage membership of the Lodge, which McGrath himself had named as part of his drive for a Protestant all-Ireland, had declined significantly to the point that only three people were regularly attending monthly meetings. McGrath's case came to trial in December 1981 and, represented by Desmond Boal QC, he asked to be rearraigned, after which McGrath pleaded guilty to five charges of gross indecency, two of buggery and eight indecent assault charges. McGrath was sentenced to four years imprisonment.

== MI5 allegations ==
In his 1999 book The Dirty War, Martin Dillon claims that McGrath may have been employed by MI5 since the 1960s, having possessed an in-depth knowledge of loyalist paramilitarism in Northern Ireland. According to Henry McDonald and Jim Cusack, McGrath provided information on fellow loyalists after being blackmailed by MI5, who were aware of his paedophilia but took no action regarding it. Chris Moore argues that McGrath's trade in illicit religious tracts behind the Iron Curtain attracted the attention of MI6, who wanted him to smuggle propaganda into the Eastern Bloc inside the bibles. From this point on, Moore contends, McGrath was associated with various aspects of the British secret service, with MI5 becoming his sole group in the early 1970s.

== Later years ==
From his prison cell in January 1982, McGrath wrote to the Secretary of Ireland's Heritage Lodge (LOL 1303) tendering his resignation, but at their next meeting this was rejected and instead they passed a motion of expulsion against him. His son Worthington McGrath was present at the meeting, at which William McGrath's expulsion was passed unanimously. The Lodge was disbanded the following month, with the membership deciding that its name was too tainted by its association with McGrath to continue.

McGrath was released from prison in December 1983 after serving two years of his sentence, settling in Ballyhalbert. He attempted to regain his membership of the Orange Order but was vetoed consistently in his attempts.

In February 1990, McGrath admitted in person to BBC journalist Chris Moore that he was the author of a document, published in 1986 by Tara, on the Anglo Irish Agreement.

McGrath died on 12 December 1991, one day after his 75th birthday. He was survived by his three children.
