= John McKeague =

Northern Irish loyalist (1930–1982)

- McKeague in a BBC interview in 1976
- Born: 1930; Bushmills, County Antrim
- Died: 29 January 1982 (aged 51–52); Albertbridge Road, Belfast
- Cause of death: Gunshot wounds
- Occupation: Shopkeeper
- Notable work: Loyalist Song Book
- Title: Leader of the Red Hand Commando
- Term: 1972–1973
- Predecessor: new position
- Successor: Winston Churchill Rea
- Political party: Protestant Unionist Party; Ulster Independence Association
- Movement: Ulster Protestant Volunteers; Shankill Defence Association; Red Hand Commando

John Dunlop McKeague (1930 – 29 January 1982) was a Northern Irish loyalist and one of the founding members of the paramilitary group the Red Hand Commando in 1970. A number of authors on the Troubles in Northern Ireland have accused McKeague, a homosexual paederast, of involvement in the Kincora Boys' Home scandal but he was never convicted. He was shot dead by the Irish National Liberation Army (INLA) in Belfast in January 1982.

== McKeague and Ian Paisley ==
A native of Bushmills, County Antrim, McKeague, who long had a reputation for anti-Catholicism, became a member of Ian Paisley's Free Presbyterian Church in 1966. McKeague and his mother moved to east Belfast in 1968, where he became a regular at Paisley's own Martyrs' Memorial Church on the Ravenhill Road and joined the Willowfield branch of the Ulster Protestant Volunteers (UPV). Before moving to Belfast he had already been questioned in relation to a sexual assault on two young boys. The charges were dropped after the intervention of some friends who held prominent positions in Northern Irish society.

McKeague split from Paisley in late 1969 under uncertain circumstances. Rumours that a young man with whom McKeague was living was his boyfriend had been rife but McKeague did not discuss the details. He stated only that he had been summoned to a meeting by Paisley where he was told he was an "embarrassment" and would have to leave the Free Presbyterian Church. Whilst giving evidence to Lord Justice Scarman as part of his tribunal investigating the 1969 Northern Ireland riots, Paisley stated that he and other Ulster Constitution Defence Committee leaders had agreed to expel McKeague from the UPV in April 1969 after he breached Rule 15 of the group's code, which banned members from supporting "subversive or lawless activities". Whatever the circumstances, the two became bitter enemies, with McKeague frequently criticising Paisley in print.

== Early loyalist involvement ==
McKeague's relationship with William McGrath's Tara, a partially clandestine organisation that sought to drive Roman Catholicism out of all of Ireland and re-establish an earlier Celtic Christianity which it claimed had existed on the island centuries earlier, has been the subject of some disagreement. According to Tim Pat Coogan, McKeague was a founder-member of Tara in 1966, although he does not elaborate on the details. Chris Moore, in his investigation into the Kincora scandal, stated that McKeague was never a member of Tara but that he and McGrath had met to discuss trading weapons between their two groups, and that following these meetings McKeague became a regular visitor to Kincora where he was involved in several rapes of underage boys living at the home. Although making no comment on his membership or otherwise of the group, Jim Cusack and Henry McDonald insist that McKeague shared the far-right conspiratorial views advanced by McGrath and UPV leader Noel Doherty. Martin Dillon also makes no comment on McKeague and Tara but insists that he was one of a number of shadowy figures, along with McGrath, who played a leading role in the formation of the Ulster Volunteer Force (UVF) in 1966 and in helping to direct its strategy for the rest of the 1960s.

In late 1969 Thomas McDowell, a member of the Free Presbyterian Church who held dual membership of the UPV and UVF, was killed after a bungled attempt to blow up the power station at Ballyshannon led to him being electrocuted, suffering severe burns. Investigations by the Garda Síochána, who found UVF insignia on McDowell's coat, led them to question his associate Samuel Stevenson who named McKeague as a central figure in a series of UVF explosions that had been carried out at the time, many involving UPV members. The case went north, where the previous explosions had taken place, and on 16 February 1970 the trial opened. McKeague, along with William Owens (McKeague's 19-year-old flatmate), Derek Elwood, Trevor Gracey and Francis Mallon, were charged with causing an earlier explosion at Templepatrick. The case collapsed after serious doubt was cast on the character of Stevenson, whose evidence was the main basis of the prosecution's case.

== Shankill Defence Association ==
In 1968 McKeague became a regular figure amongst groups of locals who every night congregated in large groups in the Woodvale area close to Ardoyne after a series of incidents between loyalists and republicans during which flags from both sides had been forcibly removed. Having split from the UPV due to its perceived inaction in May 1969, McKeague addressed a meeting of loyalists in Tennent Street Hall at which he called for organisation against Catholic rioters. From this meeting he founded the Shankill Defence Association (SDA), with the proclaimed intention to defend the Shankill Road from Catholic rioters. However, in contrast to similar Protestant vigilante groups such as the Woodvale Defence Association which were for the most part reactive, the SDA played a leading role in fomenting trouble during the Northern Ireland riots of August 1969, leading attacks on Catholic homes in the Falls Road and Crumlin Road. He became a notorious figure locally, usually prominent in the rioting, carrying a stick and wearing a helmet.

The violence of the SDA was accompanied by equally violent rhetoric from McKeague as he boasted that the group possessed "hundreds of guns" and vowed that "we will see the battle through to the end". His militant stance won him the public support of Ronald Bunting, who like McKeague had earlier been associated with Paisley but had since broken from him. In November 1969, McKeague was cleared of a charge of conspiracy to cause explosions. He was, however, sentenced to three months' imprisonment for unlawful assembly. McKeague's absence on remand for the initial charges saw his stock fall on the Shankill, where he was already mistrusted due to being from east Belfast and where his reputation had been further blackened by supporters of his former friend Ian Paisley. Leaving the Shankill he attempted to set up a group similar to the SDA on the Donegall Road but was declared persona non grata by the head of an existing local Defence Committee, who was a loyal Paisleyite. This, combined with a rumour that McKeague was a "fruit", saw him abandon all initiatives in the west and south of the city and concentrate on east Belfast. The SDA continued in his absence until 1971, when it merged with other like-minded vigilante groups to form the Ulster Defence Association (UDA).

== Political activity ==
McKeague was a candidate for the Protestant Unionist Party, the forerunner of the Democratic Unionist Party, in a Belfast Corporation by-election for the Victoria ward in the east of the city in 1969, but was not elected. He then stood as an Independent Unionist in Belfast North in the 1970 general election, but polled only 0.75% of the vote. He also began producing a magazine, Loyalist News. Much of its content was of a lowbrow nature, containing jokes and cartoons in which Catholics were portrayed as lazy, dirty, stupid and alcoholic or, in the case of women, highly promiscuous.

In 1971 he was tried for incitement to hatred after publishing the controversial Loyalist Song Book. The first man to be tried under the Incitement to Hatred Act, McKeague's book included the line "you've never seen a better Taig than with a bullet in his head". After the jury disagreed at his trial, a retrial was ordered at which he and a co-defendant were acquitted. Martin Dillon argues that it was around this time that RUC Special Branch first recruited him as an agent, allegedly using information they had obtained about his paedophile activities to force him to agree. He was handed over to the Intelligence Corps by Special Branch the following year.

== Loyalist paramilitarism ==
His mother, Isabella McKeague, was burned alive on 8 May 1971 when the UDA petrol-bombed the family shop in Albertbridge Road, Belfast. Reporting on her death in Loyalist News, John McKeague claimed she had been "murdered by the enemies of Ulster", a common term for republicans. In fact the UDA had tired of McKeague, both for his loose-cannon attitude in launching attacks and starting riots without consulting their leadership and for his promiscuous homosexuality with teenage partners. According to Ed Moloney a dispute over money had also been central to the schism between McKeague and the UDA.

McKeague broke fully from the UDA and established the Red Hand Commando in the middle of 1972, recruiting a number of young men primarily in east Belfast and North Down. McKeague had already been involved in organising the "Tartan gangs", groups of loyalist youths who were involved in rioting and general disorder, and used these as the basis of his new group. Following various attacks by his paramilitary organisation, in February 1973 he became one of the first loyalist internees, and was later imprisoned for three years on an armed robbery charge (a conviction he disputed). He started two hunger strikes in protest against the Special Powers Act and prison conditions while in jail. In his absence he lost control of the Red Hand Commando, which became an integral part of the UVF. UVF leader Gusty Spence, however, contended that he had secured McKeague's agreement that the running of the Red Hand Commando should be taken over by the UVF not long after McKeague established the movement.

Martin Dillon reports that according to British military intelligence and police files, McKeague was believed to have been behind the sadistic murder of a ten-year-old boy, Brian McDermott, in South Belfast in September 1973. The killing, which involved dismemberment and the burning of the body in Ormeau Park, was so gruesome that the local press speculated that it might have been carried out as part of a Satanic ritual. However, Gareth Mulvenna has claimed that McKeague was serving a sentence in Long Kesh for robbery when McDermott was murdered, casting doubt over the validity of this accusation. On 3 October 1975, Alice McGuinness, a Catholic civilian, was fatally injured in an IRA bomb attack on McKeague's hardware shop on the Albertbridge Road. She died three days later. McKeague's sister was severely injured in the same bombing.

== Ulster nationalism ==
McKeague became a leading figure in the Ulster Loyalist Central Coordinating Committee (ULCCC), and in 1976 publicly endorsed Ulster nationalism in his capacity as an ULCCC spokesman. The aim of the group, which McKeague chaired, was to co-ordinate loyalist paramilitaries with the aim of founding a unified "Ulster army" although this premise did not prevent a loyalist feud between the UDA and UVF continuing following its foundation.

With John McClure, McKeague contacted Irish republicans Ruairí Ó Brádaigh and Joe Cahill to initiate talks in an attempt to find a common platform for an independent Northern Ireland. This collapsed after Conor Cruise O'Brien discovered and revealed the activity.

In 1977, in a meeting brokered by the church-dissident Catholic priest Des Wilson, McKeague talked to Gerry Adams. Adams characterised the discussion as "constructive" inasmuch as it was "frank", but could discover no common ground. The contact between McKeague and his allies and the republicans, which was not endorsed by the wider ULCCC, saw the group fall apart as both the UDA and Down Orange Welfare resigned from the co-ordinating body when it came to light.

McKeague was subsequently a leading figure in the Ulster Independence Association, a group active from 1979 in support of an independent Northern Ireland. McKeague served as deputy to George Allport's leadership of the group.

== Death ==
In January 1982, McKeague was interviewed by detectives investigating his involvement in sodomising and prostituting teenage boys at Kincora. Fearful of returning to prison, McKeague told friends that in order to avoid a sentence, he was prepared to name others involved in the paedophile ring. However, on 29 January 1982, McKeague was shot dead in his shop on Albertbridge Road in east Belfast, reportedly by the INLA. It has been argued that following McKeague's threats to go public about all of those involved in Kincora his killing had been ordered by the Intelligence Corps, for many of those who could have named were also agents (often more effective than McKeague, who by that time was highly peripheral in paramilitary circles). To support this suggestion, it has been stated by Jack Holland and Henry McDonald that of the two gunmen who shot McKeague one was a known Special Branch agent and the other was rumoured to have military intelligence links.

Democratic Unionist Party (DUP) deputy leader Peter Robinson attended the removal of McKeague's remains from his sister's home in East Belfast, as did former Ulster Vanguard leader William Craig, of whose party McKeague had briefly been a member. The funeral service was attended by Fr. Des Wilson, who said: "John did a lot of terrible things but he was willing to talk to us".
