= Robin Bryans =

Anglo-Irish travel writer and music teacher (1928–2005)

Robin Bryans (born Robert Harbinson Bryans; 24 April 1928 – 11 June 2005) was a prolific author of popular travel and autobiographical works under the pen names Robin Bryans, Robert Harbinson, and Donald Cameron. Involved with the Anglo-Irish establishment throughout his life, in his later years he achieved a degree of notoriety for allegations made about a number of public figures.

== Early life ==
Robert Harbinson Bryans was born on 24 April 1928 in Belfast, into a Protestant working-class family. In 1940 he was evacuated to Fermanagh and then worked briefly as a cabin boy on a dredger. In 1944 he began studies at Barry Religious College in Wales. It was at this time, as a teenager, Bryans was befriended by the flamboyant Evan Morgan, 2nd Viscount Tredegar. Later in life, Bryans was to become openly bisexual; Guy Burgess amongst his casual partners.

== Career ==
After college, Bryans taught in Devon, before moving to London. He claimed to have spent time working on a farm in Morvern in the Highlands of Scotland, and became a missionary in Canada before becoming involved in diamond prospecting, which he also pursued in South America. He later claimed to have lived as a trapper, although he worked for a time as a teacher at Shawnigan Lake School in British Columbia. He returned to London to work in the theatre, before living and working in Grenada, Europe and elsewhere. In Canada, he befriended the elderly Adeline, Countess de la Feld, who in her youth had been a translator of Chekhov. Later, he may have been received into the Russian Orthodox Church with her as his godmother.

In 1964, Bryans returned to his native Northern Ireland to research and write a travel book, Ulster: A Journey Through the Six Counties. Produced with encouragement of the unionist government of Terence O'Neill, the book presents a narrative of social progress and civility.

In 1968, under the pseudonym Donald Cameron, he published the ostensibly autobiographical The Field of Sighing, describing a childhood in Ardnamurchan, which presumably drew upon some experience of the Scottish Highlands, and Sons of El Dorado, set in Venezuela. Perhaps responding to the more liberal social climate of the late sixties, The Field of Sighing is amongst the most explicitly homosexual of Robin Bryans' books, its narrative containing pastoral fantasies involving teenage boys.

Around 1970, Bryans appears to have suffered a mental breakdown. After falling out with publisher Charles Montieth of Faber & Faber, Bryans began a campaign of harassment, including denouncing Monteith as a homosexual in letters to judges, MPs, and other prominent figures. In 1977, Bryans was jailed after having embarked upon a bizarre campaign against community figures in the village of Rottingdean in Sussex, again involving 'scurrilous letters.' According to a newspaper report, Bryans had shouted at local people and made 'slanderous remarks', he then broke a court order by attending a church service with his partner, George Balcombe. The service was conducted by Canon David Walters, who Bryans had previously been ordered to avoid. At the altar, Bryans shouted that he was being refused the sacrament, left the church and attempted suicide by overdose of tablets. When he recovered he was sent to prison by order of the High Court. In 1979 Faber and Faber were awarded damages, and after throwing a jug of water at a barrister, Bryans was imprisoned for three years for contempt of court. Another victim was former friend, Peter Montgomery, then president of the Arts Council of Northern Ireland, whose social circle Bryans had entered in the early 1960s.

In 1988, Bryans appeared (billed as Robert Harbinson) on a notable edition of the television discussion programme After Dark "in which the author discussed secrets and scandals with H. Montgomery Hyde, Merlyn Rees, and others."

In April 1990, Bryans publicly stated in the Dublin-based magazine Now that Lord Mountbatten, Anthony Blunt, and others were involved in an old-boy network which held gay orgies in country houses and castles on both sides of the Irish border, as well as at the Kincora Boys' Home. Similar to the Faber case, Bryans sent letters and postcards to the rich and powerful in British establishment circles but once the postcards began to circulate there were complaints to the police and he was warned that he would be prosecuted for criminal libel. A not untypical example of Bryans' letter-writing style is copied here.

John Costello, the author of Mask of Treachery, a study of the Soviet Cambridge spy ring, wrote: "Bizarre though some of Harbinson's [Bryans] theories may be, those that could be checked mesh with an established record."

In later life, he worked as a librettist and was also involved in a school of music.

== Travel writings, novel and poetry ==
In 1959 Bryans published Gateway To The Khyber, followed later that year by Madeira, Pearl Of The Atlantic. During the 1960s and early 1970s, Faber and Faber published a series of travel books celebrating Iceland (1960), Denmark (1961), Brazil (1962), The Azores (1963), Malta (1966) and Trinidad & Tobago (1967).

The Arts Council of Northern Ireland described his Ulster: A Journey Through the Six Counties (1962) as "long...regarded as a perceptive introduction at a critical moment in the history of Northern Ireland and a classic of the genre".

As Robert Harbinson, he wrote Tattoo Lily And Other Ulster Stories (1961), The Far World (1962), the novel Lucio (1964) and a collection of poems, Songs Out Of Oriel.

As Donald Cameron, he published The Field of Sighing and Sons of El Dorado.

Another pen name Bryans allegedly used was Christopher Graham.

== Autobiography ==
Bryans published four volumes of autobiography as Robert Harbinson:

- No Surrender (1960)
- Song of Erne (1960)
- Up Spake the Cabin Boy (1961)
- The Protégé (1963)

The Times described these autobiographical writings as "on all planes at once; humourous, [sic] detailed and objective as a Breugel village scene; quietly indignant over injustices practised by the toffs; puzzled, exploratory, expectant as a growing boy … He writes as one with a true sense of poetry."

As Robin Bryans, he self-published a further four volumes of autobiography:

- The Dust Has Never Settled (1992)
- Let the Petals Fall (1993)
- Checkmate: Memoirs Of A Political Prisoner (1994)
- Blackmail and Whitewash (1996)

These works detailed his involvement in "sensational and sometimes scandalous events among Britain’s political aristocracy", Bryans having "intelligence connections (and being) a friend of Blunt" and an "ex-jailbird".

The books were characterised by Fortnight as follows: "The reader expecting these volumes...to pick up the narrative of the author's life where The Protege left off would be disappointed. They are barely of the same genre...Bryans is most effective in linking together, in unexpected ways, apparently unconnected worlds; the back streets of Belfast and the big houses of Fermanagh; evangelical fellowship and the intelligence services, homosexuality and religion. He reveals the intersection and interpenetration of these different spheres...These volumes seduce the reader by exploiting our inability to resist gossip."

== Death ==
Bryans' last years were spent in London. He died on 11 June 2005, aged 77.
