= Murder of Brian McDermott =

British murder victim

Brian McDermott
- Born: 1962 or 1963; Northern Ireland
- Died: 2 September 1973 (aged 10) Ormeau Park, Belfast, Northern Ireland

On 2 September 1973, Brian McDermott, a 10‑year‑old schoolboy, disappeared after being seen in Ormeau Park in Belfast, Northern Ireland. He failed to return to his home on Well Street in the lower Woodstock Road area of Cregagh. A week after he went missing, a sack containing some of his remains was found in the River Lagan.

== Background ==
Brian McDermott lived with his parents and siblings on Well Street in the lower Woodstock Road area of east Belfast. On 2 September 1973, he left home shortly after midday and went to Ormeau Park. He was seen alone in the park between 1 pm and 3 pm but did not return home for his Sunday dinner.

His partial remains were recovered several days after he went missing in the River Lagan, close to the Belfast Boat Club. They had been placed in a sack and were dismembered and burned.

== Investigation ==
McDermott's older brother, William, was 16 at the time of his disappearance. He was treated as a suspect and questioned in 1976 and again in 2004. He denied the allegations and is estranged from the rest of the family. He acknowledged that he confessed in 1976 but said the confession was coerced. He later changed his name by deed poll to avoid the stigma of being linked to his brother's murder. McDermott's murder remains unsolved.

In 1982, a possible link between McDermott's death and the abuse scandal at Kincora Boys' Home was discussed by Jim Prior, Michael Havers, senior civil servant Sir William Bourne, and Quintin Hogg, who at the time was the Secretary of State for Northern Ireland and Lord Chancellor. Papers relating to this meeting were released in 2013.

== See also ==
- List of solved missing person cases: 1950–1999
- List of unsolved murders (1900–1979)
