= Families Against Intimidation and Terror =

Historical advocacy group in Ireland

Families Against Intimidation and Terror (FAIT) was a group that campaigned against paramilitary violence during the Troubles in Northern Ireland. Formed in 1990 by Nancy Gracey and others following the shooting of her son by a paramilitary organisation, it was funded by, among others, the British Government, having a budget of about £30,000. In addition to Gracey its public spokespersons were its director Sam Cushnahan and development officer Vincent McKenna. Clifford Peeples was also a prominent member.

McKenna, who claimed to have been a member of the Provisional Irish Republican Army in 1980-91 and was especially vociferous in campaigning against the IRA, appeared on a United Kingdom Unionist Party platform and accused named individuals of responsibility for the Omagh bombing. Cushnahan then resigned, and in 1999 McKenna abandoned FAIT and campaigned as the Northern Ireland Human Rights Bureau, while FAIT disappeared from view. In 2000 McKenna was convicted of 31 counts of child sexual abuse and thereafter started blogging online as the "Irish Observer".
