= European Theological Seminary and College of the Bible International =

Unaccredited Irish Christian College

The European Theological Seminary and College of the Bible International is an unaccredited fundamentalist Christian college based in Northern Ireland and Birmingham, England. It has no buildings and is operated from the home of its founder and president, Gordon Beck.

== Foundation ==
ETSCBI was founded in 1993 by Gordon Beck, a Scotsman who has lived in Northern Ireland for most of his life. Mr Beck describes himself as "Professor Dr", even though he has never taught at any established college or seminary and his theological education is entirely self-taught. He claims to have earned a doctor of philosophy degree from Trinity College and Seminary, a Christian college in Newburgh, Indiana. Mr Beck is named as the college's president, Founder and Convener of the Board of Examiners.

== UK government investigation ==
In May 2007, following complaints about the quality of ETSCBI degrees and a BBC investigation, Trading Standards, a division of the UK government's Department of Trade and Industry, announced that it had initiated an investigation into the quality of the degrees offered by the college.

Upon the announcement of the government investigation, the college's website (https://web.archive.org/web/20061213145849/http://www.europeantheologicalacademie.co.uk/) ceased to be accessible.

== BBC investigation ==
On 27 May 2007, BBC Northern Ireland's Sunday Sequence programme broadcast the findings of an investigation into the European Theological Seminary and College of the Bible International. This included an interview with a "whistleblower", an unnamed "graduate" of ETSCBI who alleged that he had been awarded a Doctor of Philosophy degree in September 2001 for a dissertation completed in six weeks, for a cost of £500 (UK sterling), and with no supervision provided by the college. He claimed that Gordon Beck had examined the dissertation in a 20-minute interview conducted at Mr Beck's home on the outskirts of Belfast, having never had sight of the work in advance of the interview. The student was told at the interview that he was to be awarded the PhD degree and was subsequently mailed a degree certificate. Mr Beck was interviewed on the same programme and acknowledged that ETSCBI kept no accounts and had no treasurer; and that the student had been awarded the degree in the timescale alleged. Mr Beck also confirmed that he had never studied at any recognised university or college and that his only degrees were from unaccredited correspondence colleges.
