= Tara (Northern Ireland) =

Ulster loyalist movement

Tara was an Ulster loyalist movement in Northern Ireland that espoused a brand of evangelical Protestantism. Preaching a hard-line and somewhat esoteric brand of loyalism, Tara enjoyed some influence in the late 1960s before declining amid a high-profile sex abuse scandal involving its leader William McGrath.

== Origins ==
The roots of Tara lay in a group known as "The Cell". This shadowy group, headed by the evangelist William McGrath, was made up of a mixture of his youthful followers and senior Orangemen who met at 15 Wellington Park, McGrath's Malone Road, Belfast base for his mission. Young men such as Fraser Agnew, Roy Garland and Clifford Smyth, became part of this growing but mainly clandestine group. The Cell spearheaded a campaign of speeches to Protestant audiences, more political than religious in tone, encouraging unionists to turn away from the relatively moderate Terence O'Neill and to lend their support to his most vocal political opponent, the hardline Ian Paisley.

== Development ==
In November 1966 McGrath reconstituted The Cell as Tara, choosing the name to reflect his belief in the Irish heritage of his politico-religious mission. It was intended as an outlet for virulent anti-Catholicism. The group endorsed British Israelism as it sometimes claimed that Ulster Protestants were descendants of the Lost tribe of Israel. The group espoused a form of historical revisionism, arguing that the early inhabitants of Ireland had come from modern Scotland before being displaced by the Irish, whilst also utilising Gaelic terms and symbols. An Orange Order lodge attached to Tara and founded by McGrath was named "Ireland's Heritage" as a consequence of these views. Tara adopted as its motto "we hold Ulster that Ireland might be saved and Britain reborn". As a movement Tara sought to establish a Protestant Northern Ireland in which law and order would be paramount and the Roman Catholic Church would be outlawed. Tara viewed Catholics as being in a grand conspiracy with moderate unionists and left-wing groups and felt that a conflict between Protestantism and Catholicism was inevitable. As a result, members of Tara were expected to be proficient in weapon use and were encouraged to join the security forces.

A short-lived alliance with the Ulster Volunteer Force (UVF) was attempted and Roy Garland, a leading Orangeman in the 60s and 70s, and now an author, was one of Tara's members who worked closely with the UVF for a time. The leaders of the UVF initially encouraged their members to also become involved in Tara. With the UVF under the command of Samuel McClelland in the late 1960s, McGrath felt that an alliance with the better-armed group could help advance Tara's aims.

Tara enjoyed a rush of members around 1969 as McGrath's prophecy of a doomsday scenario in Northern Ireland looked like it might come true with the advent of the Troubles and a UVF bombing campaign, which McGrath suggested in a whispering campaign was the work of the Irish Army. Tara soon established their regular meeting place as Clifton Street Orange Hall, one of the most important centres of Belfast Orangeism, although McGrath did not openly tell the Orange Order leadership that he was using the rooms for Tara meetings, rather simply stating that he need them for generic meetings. A more formalised structure was adopted with Garland as deputy leader, Clifford Smyth as Intelligence Officer and leading roles for Frank Millar Jr and Protestant Telegraph journalist David Browne, whilst Davy Payne was also associate with the group, albeit at a lower level.

Although initially Tara and the UVF co-operated closely, a number of people contacted McClelland to tell him that McGrath, who secretly pursued homosexual and pederastic relationships, was using the link-up with the UVF as a way to pick up young men who were members of the organisation. McClelland confronted McGrath who fiercely denied the allegations, but following a fiery argument the relationship between the UVF and Tara was ended and McClelland burnt the Tara ledger in which the names of his UVF men had been entered. From that point on the UVF proscribed Tara membership for its volunteers and sought to hamper the work of Tara. On a more practical level a number of UVF members who had become involved in Tara also informed their UVF superiors that Tara did not possess much in the way of weaponry or military know-how and according to Steve Bruce "Tara had a good line in martial rhetoric but even its claims to be ready for martial defence rang hollow". Bruce further adds that, for the most part, UVF members had simply used their attendance at Tara meetings as an opportunity to identify new recruits for their own group.

== Decline ==
Tara failed to attract much interest as its ideas were too esoteric for most loyalists. By 1971 McGrath's relationship with his deputy Garland had deteriorated, as the two began to differ over ideology, whilst Garland had also been informed by some young members of Tara that McGrath had made passes at them. Garland broke from Tara soon afterwards and confirmed to the UVF that their suspicions about McGrath had been correct. A war of words erupted between the two groups, with McGrath and Tara regularly attacked in the pages of UVF magazine Combat and McGrath undertaking a letter-writing campaign to the press accusing the UVF of being a communist organisation. McGrath sought to boost the ailing movement by linking up with John McKeague, a member of the Free Presbyterian Church, leading figure in the Shankill Defence Association and founder of the Red Hand Commando who allegedly shared McGrath's sexual attraction to men and children. The pair met at the Kincora Boys' Home, where McGrath took up a position in 1971, to discuss trading weapons for their respective groups. Around this time McGrath also made contact with another leading homosexual unionist, Sir Knox Cunningham, and secured funding for Tara from him.

By 1974 Tara had an estimated 300–400 members, which was significantly less than the group had at their 1969 peak. In an attempt to inject some life into the group, which unlike the UVF, RHC and UDA was not active in shooting or bombing attacks, McGrath imported a quantity of rifles, machine guns and ammunition from hard-line Protestants in the Netherlands with whom he had close links.

In 1976 a Queen's University graduate who was a member of Taras's "brigade staff" made three trips to the Netherlands, where one of his main contacts was the Utrecht-based secretary of the anti-Ecumenist International Council of Christian Churches, of which Ian Paisley's Free Presbyterian Church was a leading member. During these trips a variety of firearms, ammunition and plastic explosives were bought to be transported back to Northern Ireland. They included belt-fed MG 42 machine guns, MP 40 submachine guns, M1 carbines, .22 rifles with telescopic sights and silencers, Beretta machine pistols, Luger pistols, .303 rifles, shotguns and around 50,000 rounds of assorted ammunition. Reportedly, at least some of these arms originated from Apartheid South Africa.

Many Tara members were Royal Ulster Constabulary reservists with access to standard police weapons like 9mm Walther pistols and Sterling submachine guns. Near Dromore, County Down, Tara members assembled home-made submachine guns based on the Sterling, with a rifled barrel which made them far more reliable than those manufactured by the UDA. In June 1981 a Tara member from Dromore, Walther Crothers, walked free from Belfast Crown Court after being fined £600 for possessing detonators, firearm components and a quantity of assorted ammunition. During the trial Crothers claimed he had assembled the arsenal at his home for use under the direction of the security forces in the event of a "doomsday situation". The presiding judge, Robert Babington, said: "I am satisfied you felt very strongly, clearly and honestly and that you thought you were behaving as a good patriot should. But the way you went about it was totally and utterly wrong".

The group continued to speak of a coming "doomsday" scenario in which they would have to take the lead in battling the Irish government and returning the island to its pre-Catholic roots, although beyond some drilling Tara undertook no real activity. In April 1973 posters issued by the group appeared in Belfast, calling for Protestants to bring up their children in the Protestant faith, an end to illegal drinking clubs, the return of capital punishment, the use of lawful authorities to "crush" the "spirit of rebellion" if it arises in a community, the Catholic Church to be made an illegal organisation, for Protestants to have a knowledge of firearms and to be prepared to "fight to the death" and finally:

We must campaign now for integrated education. All Roman Catholic centres of education must be closed.

In June 1974 Tara published a full-page advertisement in Belfast newspapers calling for the Catholic Church to be proscribed under the law and claiming civil war was inevitable. According to Steve Bruce the group did little beyond releasing occasional threatening statements but was quickly superseded by the UVF/RHC and eventually also the UDA. The group spread rumours about senior unionist figures whom it felt were too moderate.

A 1981 arms find damaged the group whilst McGrath had already been caught up in the Kincora scandal. McGrath pleaded guilty to fifteen charges related to child sex abuse in December 1981 and was sentenced to four years imprisonment, representing the effective end of the by then near-moribund Tara. The name reappeared in 1986, when a leaflet denouncing the Anglo-Irish Agreement and predicting again the onset of the doomsday scenario was circulated, although this seems to have been the work of a handful of die-hards rather than a reorganised movement. In September 1986 a group calling itself Tara threatened "all republicans in loyalist areas".
