= Anthony Cavendish =

British MI6 officer

Anthony John Cavendish (20 July 1927 – 12 January 2013) was a British MI6 officer who served in Germany and Austria during the early years of the Cold War.

Cavendish was born in London, but raised in Switzerland and grew up speaking English, German, Swiss-German and French. He volunteered for the British Army in 1944 and served in Secret Intelligence Middle East (SIME) where he struck up a lifelong friendship with Maurice Oldfield, a future Chief of the Secret Intelligence Service. Following his demobilisation in 1948, he was recruited as the Secret Intelligence Service's youngest officer, aged 21, and worked in R5, the counterespionage section.

Cavendish left SIS in 1953 and turned to journalism, covering Eastern Europe and the Middle East for United Press International and filing acclaimed eyewitness dispatches from Budapest during the Hungarian Revolution of 1956. He subsequently pursued a career as a businessman and merchant banker, but remained friendly with former colleagues in the intelligence world.

When Oldfield fell victim to a smear campaign in 1980, following his appointment as British Prime minister Margaret Thatcher's security supremo for Northern Ireland, Cavendish began writing a slim volume of memoirs intended to clear his friend's name. He started writing it shortly after Oldfield’s death, abandoned it when SIS made their displeasure clear, and then completed it after further smears against Oldfield appeared in 1987. SIS again told Cavendish that it could not be published, whereupon he had 500 copies of Inside Intelligence printed and circulated to the Establishment as 'Christmas cards’ in December 1987. This attempt by Cavendish to restore Oldfield's reputation led to a two-year game of cat-and-mouse with Whitehall censors until the House of Lords threw out the government's case. The book was published formally by HarperCollins in 1990.

In May 1989 Cavendish made an extended appearance on the Channel 4 discussion programme After Dark, alongside Tony Benn, Lord Dacre, James Rusbridger, Miles Copeland and others.

== Personal life ==
Cavendish was a bon vivant known for his warm, clubbable nature and unswerving loyalty to friends. He married twice and had two children by his second wife, Elspeth.
