= Orange Volunteers =

Small Ulster paramilitary group in Northern Ireland

Orange Volunteers Orange Volunteer Force
- Orange Volunteers logo. The motto translates as "Fortune favours the bold"
- Leader: Clifford Peeples (until 2001)
- Dates active: July 1998 – unknown
- Active regions: Northern Ireland
- Ideology: Ulster loyalism Protestant fundamentalism Anti-Catholicism; Anti-Masonry
- Status: unknown
- Size: less than 25 members

The Orange Volunteers (OV) or Orange Volunteer Force (OVF) is a small Ulster loyalist paramilitary group in Northern Ireland. It was formed in 1998 by loyalists who opposed the Good Friday Agreement and the loyalist ceasefires. Over the following year it carried out a wave of bomb and gun attacks on Catholics and Catholic-owned properties in rural areas, but since 2000 has been relatively inactive. The group has been associated with elements of the Orange Order and has a Calvinist fundamentalist ideology. OV's original leader was Clifford Peeples. The OV are a Proscribed Organisation in the United Kingdom under the Terrorism Act 2000 and have been included on the U.S. State Department's, "Terrorist Exclusion List", since 2001.

== Origins ==
The OV emerged during the 1998 Drumcree conflict when the Royal Ulster Constabulary and British Army prevented members of the Portadown Orange Order and their supporters from returning to the town centre down the Garvaghy road. However, there is evidence to suggest that they had been actively recruiting and training members since as early as 1985. The group is believed to be made up of dissident loyalists who disapprove of the Northern Ireland peace process and also of the more militant members of the Orange Order, including former members of the Loyalist Volunteer Force and Ulster Defence Association. David Ervine, at the time a leading member of the Progressive Unionist Party, described the group as little more than a gang of Protestant fundamentalists and drug-dealers.

== Activities ==
In 1998 and 1999, the Orange Volunteers were led by Clifford Peeples, a Protestant pastor from Belfast. One of the group's first actions was a synchronized attack on 11 Catholic churches. Peeples defended the attack on the grounds that the churches were "bastions of the Antichrist".

On 27 November 1998, eight masked OV members brandishing guns and grenades staged a "show of strength" for a local journalist. The gunmen began the meeting with a Bible reading and ended it with prayers. They produced a "covenant" that said: "We are defenders of the reformed faith. Our members are practising Protestant worshippers". They went on to state: "We are prepared to defend our people and if it comes to the crunch we will assassinate the enemies of Ulster. Ordinary Catholics have nothing to fear from us. But the true enemies will be targeted, and that's a lot wider than just Sinn Féin and the IRA". They vowed to target IRA prisoners released as part of the Belfast Agreement and claimed responsibility for a string of attacks on Irish nationalist-owned businesses a month beforehand.

== Timeline ==
=== 1998 ===
- 31 October 1998: the OV claimed responsibility for a gun attack on a Catholic-owned pub on Colinglen Road, Belfast.
- 17 December 1998: the OV claimed responsibility for a blast bomb attack on a pub on Ballyganniff Road near Crumlin, County Antrim. It said it was an attempt to kill a senior IRA member.
- 17 December 1998: the OV claimed responsibility for throwing a grenade and firing shots at the home of a known republican in Castledawson, County Londonderry.
- December 1998: the OV claimed responsibility for a gun and bomb attack on the home of a Catholic civilian in Knockcloghrim, County Londonderry.

=== 1999 ===
- 19 January 1999: The OV claimed responsibility for a pipe bomb attack on a house in Loughinisland, County Down. The man who lived there was wounded. The OV claimed that he was a "PIRA commander in South Down".
- 6 January 1999: The OV claimed responsibility for a booby-trap bomb attack on builders working on a Gaelic Athletic Association (GAA) club in Magherafelt, County Londonderry. A Catholic builder was injured.
- 8 February 1999: The OV claimed responsibility for a grenade attack on a Catholic-owned pub near Toome, County Antrim.
- 9 February 1999: The OV claimed responsibility for an attack on a Catholic-owned pub in Castledawson, County Londonderry. It also claimed responsibility for planting a pipe bomb outside a pub in Crumlin.
- 1 March 1999: A bomb was found on the windowsill of a Catholic-owned house in Coalisland, County Tyrone. It is believed the OV were responsible.
- 3 March 1999: The United Kingdom designated the OV, along with the Red Hand Defenders (RHD), as terrorist organizations.
- 23 March 1999: The OV claimed responsibility for a booby-trap bomb attack at a scrapyard on Station Road, Castlewellan, County Down. One man was injured.
- 24 March 1999: The OV claimed responsibility for a grenade attack on the Derryhirk Inn near Aghagallon, County Antrim.
- 26 March 1999: The OV were blamed for planting a pipe bomb outside the home of a Catholic family in Randalstown, County Antrim.
- 10 April 1999: The OV claimed responsibility for a pipe bomb attack on a pub near Templepatrick, County Antrim. One man was injured.
- 25 April 1999: The OV claimed responsibility for a grenade attack on a house in the Legoniel area of Belfast.
- 28 April 1999: The OV claimed responsibility for a pipe bomb attack on the Ramble Inn pub in County Antrim. Several cars were damaged.
- Autumn 1999: In a series of police raids aimed at dissident loyalists, eight arrests were made while weapons and ammunition were found during a search of Stoneyford Orange Hall in County Antrim. Police also found military files containing the personal details of over 300 republicans from south Armagh and Belfast.

=== 2000 ===
- June 2000: The OV threatened to kill GAA officials in the run-up to the Ulster Gaelic football championships.
- 29 August 2000: The OV claimed responsibility for burning-down Brennan's Bar in west Belfast.
- 28 September 2000: The OV declared that it had ceased all "military activity".

=== 2001 ===
- July 2001: The OV claimed responsibility of killing Catholic 19-year-old Ciaran Cummings in a shooting in County Antrim. However, the Red Hand Defenders (paramilitary with strong links with OV) also claimed responsibility. In 2007 an inquest heard that the Red Hand Defenders and the OV may have worked together in the killing
- 6 December 2001: The United States designated the OV and Red Hand Defenders (RHD) as "terrorist organizations".
- 27 December 2001: The OV declared that it would be ceasing "military operations" after 31 December 2001. It is understood the group decided to go on ceasefire after a plea by a senior clergyman.

=== 2002 - 2004 ===
- 2 August 2002: Sinn Féin's Alex Maskey, the new Lord Mayor of Belfast, was sent a bullet in the post. The death threat has been attributed to the OV. It arrived at City Hall in Belfast only hours before Maskey was to take part in a rally against sectarianism.
- September 2003: The OV were believed to have been responsible for a number of attacks on Catholic-owned houses and the Catholic church in Stoneyford.
- 14 November 2003: The OV were linked to a pipe bomb attack on the home of a Catholic couple in Stoneyford, County Antrim. There had been several previous attacks on the same family.
- 10 February 2004: Two men boarded a bus in the loyalist Milltown Estate near Lisburn and severely beat the Catholic driver, warning him that he would be shot by the OV if he returned to the area.

=== 2008 ===
- 26 September 2008: The OV were believed to have been behind an arson attack on St Johns GAA club near Castlewellan, County Down. It is believed that the attack was revenge for attacks on Orange halls in the area.
- 8 November 2008: The OV claimed responsibility for burning-down Edendork GAA hall in County Tyrone. It claimed that it was revenge for attacks on Orange halls.
- November 2008: Sinn Féin claimed that the OV was responsible for planting a pipe bomb near the home of a Sinn Féin councillor in Cookstown, County Tyrone.
- 2 December 2008: Sinn Féin minister Conor Murphy claimed to have been told by the Police Service of Northern Ireland of a recent attempt on his life by the OV in the Newry area.

=== 2009 ===
- 9 March 2009: The OV claimed responsibility for planting a pipe bomb at Sinn Féin's office on Burn Road in Cookstown, County Tyrone. It claimed that the attack was revenge for the Massereene Barracks shooting.
- 18 August 2009: The OV claimed responsibility for attacks on Catholic and nationalist owned businesses in Garvagh, Rasharkin, Dunloy and Ballymoney. The OV claimed the attacks were revenge for arson incidents at Orange halls.
- 24 August 2009: The OV claimed responsibility for planting a bomb at the back of a house on Smith Street, Moneymore, County Londonderry. It claimed it was retaliation for "republican attacks on Protestant property and churches" in the area. The bomb was made safe by the security forces.

In addition to the attacks listed above, the OV have also sent numerous death threats to members of Sinn Féin. These include Gerry Adams, Alex Maskey, Gerry Kelly, Francie Molloy, Caitríona Ruane, Cara McShane and Mary McArdle.

== Police crackdown ==
In a series of police raids aimed at dissident loyalists in Autumn 1999, eight arrests were made, weapons, pipe bombs and ammunition were recovered and a search of Stoneyford Orange Hall in County Antrim uncovered military files containing the personal details of over 300 republicans from South Armagh and Belfast. Peeples and another loyalist were arrested by the RUC after their car was stopped on the outskirts of Dungannon and two hand grenades and a pipe bomb were discovered. In 2001 he was jailed for ten years for possession of the weapons. He was released in 2004 and became the minister of a Pentecostal church on the Shankill Road in Belfast. Four other members of the group were convicted of a range of terrorist offences, including possession of an automatic rifle, in December 2000.

== See also ==
- Red Hand Defenders
- Real Ulster Freedom Fighters
