= Stoneyford, County Antrim =

Village in County Antrim, Northern Ireland

Stoneyford
- community
- Coordinates: 54.566986°N 6.121023°W

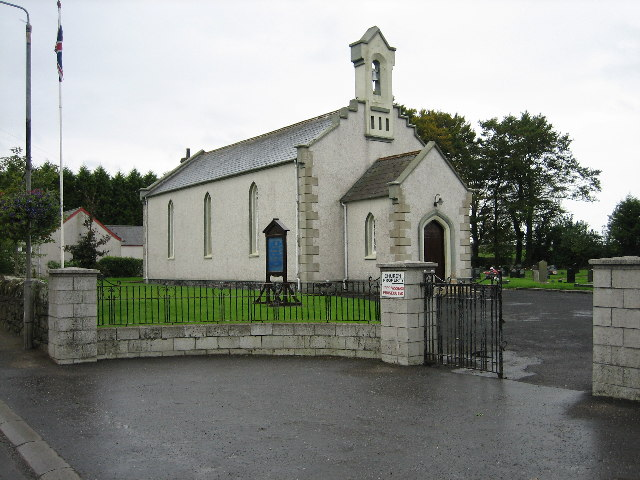
St John's, Stoneyford

Stoneyford (also known as Stonyford) is a small village in County Antrim, Northern Ireland. It is between Glenavy and Milltown, about 5 miles (8 km) north of Lisburn. In the 2001 Census it had a population of 318 people. It is situated in the Lisburn and Castlereagh City Council area.

Stoneyford originated as a small settlement, historically referred to as Aghnalough (from the Irish: Áth na gCloch). The Stoneyford River flows through the village from the east to Lough Neagh.

Locally significant buildings include St John's Church built pre-1850, which is a listed building, and a pre 1830 two-story dwelling situated on Stoneyford Road.

== Places of interest ==
The village is directly north of Stoneyford Reservoir, a popular angling spot for rainbow trout and brown trout.

== Recent history ==
During a 1999 Police Service of Northern Ireland (PSNI) investigation into the activities of the Orange Volunteers and the Red Hand Defenders, secret military intelligence files on almost 400 Irish republicans, which had been downloaded from computers at British Army Headquarters in nearby Thiepval Barracks, were found in Stoneyford Orange Hall.

In July 2010, the Police Ombudsman confirmed that four police officers were disciplined over not having done enough to prevent attacks against Catholics living in the village. A Catholic family had left the village as a result of the attacks.

== Notable people ==
- Hugh Gordon (1794–1854), violin maker

== See also ==
- List of villages in Northern Ireland
- List of places in County Antrim
