= Roy Garland =

Northern Irish journalist

Personal details
- Born: Northern Ireland
- Party: Ulster Unionist Party
- Occupation: Newspaper columnist

Roy Garland is a newspaper columnist for the news publication Irish News and a member of the Ulster Unionist Party.

== Career ==
In the 1960s, Garland became convinced that the Northern Ireland civil rights movement was a front for the IRA and Roman Catholic Church and that its activities would lead to the persecution of Protestants. As a result he got deeply involved in paramilitarism, Orangeism and Unionism. At that time one of the organisations Garland supported was Tara, a movement, led by William McGrath, which espoused extreme anti-Catholic views. In the late 60s, he worked closely with the UVF in an attempt the strengthen links between the two groups. Garland later became a prominent opponent of McGrath and helped expose his involvement in the Kincora Boys' Home scandal.

Some years later, Garland had grave doubts about the direction in which the Orange Order and the Ulster Unionist Party (UUP) were going and he left both organisations. According to Garland, "...there was a lot of twisting of the rules, and also I heard stories about people within our organisation attacking Catholics and I felt that this wasn't right, this was not the war, you know, to protect ourselves - this was actually an aggressive war."

Garland subsequently returned to the UUP, aiming to support a non-sectarian unionism. However he is a vocal opponent of closer links between the UUP and the Conservative Party, and was in October 2009 described as one of "four older men who no longer play an active role in the party."

He inherited his family's cleaning-products business, and is now a journalist and writer for the Irish News. He is also the author of several books including Gusty Spence and The Ulster Volunteer Force: Negotiating history.
