= Hugh Gordon (violin maker) =

Northern Irish violin maker

- Born: 1794; Ballymacward, Stoneyford, County Antrim, Ireland
- Died: 3 April 1854 (aged 59–60); Ballymacward, Stoneyford, County Antrim
- Resting place: St. Aidan's Church, Glenavy, County Antrim
- Known for: Violin making
- Style: Amati style; Gordon Style; Stradivari style
- Movement: Irish school
- Spouse: Sarah Hood (m. 1825)
- Children: James, Hugh, Isabella Elizabeth, Mary Jane, William

Hugh Gordon (1794 – 3 April 1854) was a violin maker from Stoneyford, County Antrim, Ireland. It is estimated that he may have made as many as 50 violins. His instruments were labelled on the inside with the date and branded on the back below the button 'Gordon'. Gordon was also an accomplished blacksmith and farmer.

== Early life ==
Gordon was born in the townland of Ballymacward, Stoneyford, County Antrim in 1794. Gordon first trained as a blacksmith and farmer and was described as "a mechanical genius...who could make anything".

== Legacy ==
Several lectures on the life and work of Gordon, as well as demonstrations of his violins, have been given by teacher and author, Michael Costello, to societies such as Killultagh Historical Society in October 2008, and the Lisburn Historical Society in December 2009.

In 2009, Costello wrote a book on the life of Hugh Gordon titled Gordon of Stoneyford, Violin Maker, which was published in 2010. The book was written in Ulster-Scots, the dialect of Scots spoken in Stoneyford during Gordon's lifetime. Costello dedicated the book to the descendants of Gordon, some of whom still reside in Stoneyford and the surrounding areas.

On 25 April 2010, a radio show about Gordon was broadcast on BBC Radio Ulster. On the show, Costello talked to Andy Mattison about how he has always been fascinated with the Gordon and about his book on Gordon. In 2011, BBC Northern Ireland produced a short documentary on Gordon. The documentary featured author Costello and fiddle player Geordie McAdam who examined some of Gordon's surviving instruments from Costello's personal collection.

Costello also wrote a song about the life of Gordon called The Ballad of Hugh Gordon. In November 2022, he released a recording of the song, performed by him, on YouTube.
