= Shankill Defence Association =

Northern Irish loyalist vigilante group

The Shankill Defence Association was a loyalist vigilante group formed in May 1969 for the defence of the loyalist Shankill Road area of Belfast, Northern Ireland during the communal disturbances that year.

The Shankill Defence Association was formed by John McKeague, with the intention of defending the Shankill from Irish Republican rioters at the start of the Troubles in Northern Ireland. William "Plum" Smith was a leading member. In the 1969 Northern Ireland riots, the SDA was involved in providing what coordination there was of violence on the Protestant side. Although McKeague had been close to Ian Paisley the dissident unionist leader issued a statement when the SDA was formed repudiating any connection between McKeague and the SDA and his own groups the Ulster Protestant Volunteers and the Ulster Constitution Defence Committee.

In 1971, it merged with similar Ulster Loyalist groups elsewhere to form the Ulster Defence Association.
