= Kincora Boys' Home =

Boys' home in Northern Ireland, subject of a child abuse scandal

Coordinates: 54.5961°N 5.8748°W

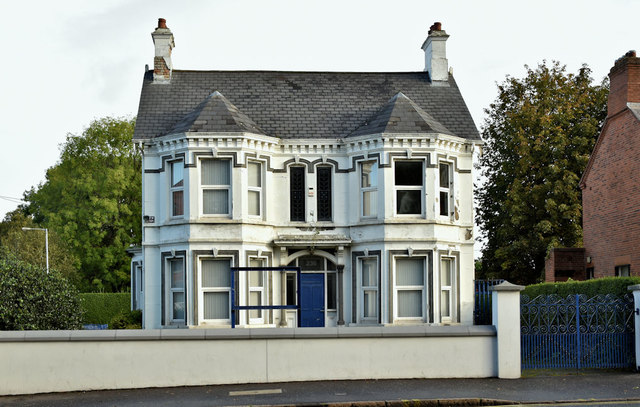
The former Kincora Boys' Home, photographed in 2019. The building was demolished in 2022

The Kincora Boys' Home was a boys' home in Belfast, Northern Ireland, United Kingdom, that was the scene of organised child sexual abuse. It caused a scandal and led to an attempted cover-up in 1980, with allegations of state collusion.

On 31 May 2016, the Northern Ireland Historical Institutional Abuse Inquiry (HIA) began examining allegations relating to Kincora, including claims that a child sex ring with links to the intelligence services was based there. Northern Ireland Secretary Theresa Villiers said that all state agencies would co-operate with the inquiry. On 20 January 2017, the HIA inquiry concluded that the abuse which took place at Kincora was limited to the actions of three staff members and did not take place with the collusion of the state or intelligence services. The head of the HIA observed that it was a matter of urgency that the victims be compensated up to £100,000.

In 2016, Gary Hoy, a former resident of Kincora, lost a UK Supreme Court challenge to the powers of the HIA, which could not compel the UK security services to hand over documents or testify. Clint Massey, another former resident, likewise stated in 2015 that due to the scope of the allegations, the HIA was inappropriate and that, instead, Kincora should be investigated by the Goddard Inquiry. Richard Kerr, another former resident, rejected the remarks made by HIA, specifically the claim that the abuse was limited to three members of staff. In March 2016, he issued a High Court writ suing four government agencies. He continued to challenge the veracity of the HIA investigation and advocated for it to be extended scope to include sexual abuse at Europa Hotel in Belfast, Northern Ireland, as well as in UK and Europe.

In 2025, a book alleged that Lord Mountbatten had sexually abused boys at Kincora.

== History ==
The home was set up in 1958 by the local health authority to provide full-time accommodation for boys of (then) working age (15–18) who faced an abusive or otherwise compromised home life. The Home closed in 1980 following the exposure of serious wrongdoing by staff and others, which started shortly after it opened.

Following the closure of the home, the building was used as office space. It was demolished in 2022 for redevelopment of the site.

== Sex abuse ==
=== First reported ===
The abuse first came to public attention on 24 January 1980 with a news report in the Irish Independent: "Fitt to raise 'cover up' in Westminster – Sex Racket at Children's Home". It was reported that no prosecutions had taken place, despite allegations of abuse first surfacing in 1977 and the Royal Ulster Constabulary (RUC) at Belfast's Strandtown and Donegall Pass stations giving the Director of Public Prosecutions a report detailing allegations of boys being sexually abused and prostituted, and naming prominent businessmen as being involved. On 3 April 1980 three members of staff at the home, William McGrath, Raymond Semple and Joseph Mains, were charged with a number of offences relating to the systematic sexual abuse of children in their care over a number of years; they were all convicted. Mains, who had been the warden, was sentenced to six years' imprisonment, Semple, an assistant warden, to five years, and McGrath was jailed in December 1981 for four years.

=== Allegations of cover-up ===
Allegations were later made that the RUC had been informed of the abuse at the home for years previously, but had not moved to prevent it. In his 1999 book The Dirty War, Martin Dillon claims that McGrath, who was also the leader of an obscure loyalist paramilitary group called Tara, may have been employed by MI5 since the 1960s and was being blackmailed into providing intelligence on other loyalist groups.

Ian Paisley, leader of the Democratic Unionist Party and moderator of the Free Presbyterian Church which he founded in 1951, was accused of failing to report McGrath's abuse to the relevant authorities. He initially denied ever being advised by his informant, a church member, Valerie Shaw, that it was taking place. Paisley later gave other versions acknowledging learning from Shaw about McGrath's homosexuality. During this time, it was alleged by the British satirical current affairs magazine Private Eye that "senior British military and judicial figures" were involved in the sexual abuse of boys in Kincora.

=== New policy overturned ===
In response to increasing coverage in the media, the Eastern Health and Social Services Board decided to institute a policy of not employing homosexuals in any caring roles. Some people working in other homes, who were not alleged to have participated in abuse, were discovered to be homosexual and dismissed. The policy was later overturned by the Northern Ireland Department of Health and Social Services.

=== 1982 and 1984 inquiries ===
A "private inquiry" was set up in January 1982 by James Prior, the Northern Ireland Secretary, under the Commissioner of Complaints, Stephen McGonagle, to deal with these allegations. However, it collapsed after three of its members resigned because they felt that the RUC had failed to carry out an effective investigation.

Debates on Kincora were held in the Northern Ireland Assembly on 22 March and 9 November 1983. In January 1984, another inquiry, under Judge William Hughes with W.J. Patterson and Harry Whalley, was set up by James Prior.

Judge Hughes's Committee of Inquiry into Children's Homes and Hostels submitted its 355-page report on 31 December 1985. Amongst its 56 recommendations, which related mostly to the operation of children's homes and child care regulation, was one (46) that every criminal allegation made by a resident should be referred to the police. Another (4) was that the legal position regarding the exclusion of homosexuals from employment in residential child care should be established although the committee concluded that "the weight of opinion is against a policy of exclusion".

According to the report, the 12 February 1982 The Irish Times referred to a BBC programme, "Scene Around Six", saying there was a "prostitution ring operating from the Kincora home" was stated as unwarranted and sourced inaccurately to a witness who was never resident in Kincora and who had been abused by his uncle. That witness said "I have no knowledge of any important or influential men involved in any sex with me or any other boys."

Hughes concluded that, "The events giving rise to this Inquiry...can no longer be regarded as exceptional. They must perhaps be recognised as earlier symptoms of a general malaise permeating the United Kingdom."

Joshua Cardwell, an east Belfast Unionist Party of Northern Ireland (UPNI) councillor and Stormont MP who formerly chaired the Belfast Corporation Welfare Committee responsible for children's homes, committed suicide in 1982 after making a statement to the RUC in March over Kincora.

Cardwell told the police of one conversation with the Belfast Town Clerk who had mentioned an imprecise allegation of homosexual conduct, but said that no complaints had ever come his way. The Hughes report concluded, "There is no evidence that Councillor Cardwell took steps to prevent an investigation or suppress the matter. Nor is there any evidence that the Ministry of Home Affairs became aware of allegations or rumours of relating to homosexual misconduct at Kincora."

=== Later revelations ===
In April 1990 writer Robert Harbinson (also known as Robin Bryans) stated in the Dublin-based magazine Now that Lord Mountbatten, Anthony Blunt and others were all involved in an old-boy network which held gay orgies in country houses on both sides of the Irish border, as well as at the Kincora Boys' Home. Harbinson sent letters and postcards to members of the British establishment but once the postcards began to circulate there were complaints to the police and Harbinson was warned that he would be prosecuted for criminal libel. An example of his letter-writing style is copied here.

In July 2014 former military intelligence officer Colin Wallace said that any new investigation into the abuse at the home should have access to information from intelligence agencies. Wallace said that he received intelligence in 1973 that boys at the home were being abused, but some of his superior officers refused to pass on information. He also said that the Terry and Hughes inquiries did not examine evidence relating to the intelligence services.

In August 2014 another former intelligence officer, Brian Gemmell, said that he also had been ordered to stop investigating allegations of abuse at the home. He said that he learned details of what happened in the home while gathering information on loyalists. He was told he was running two agents who had close links to the home. As well as telling him not to investigate, the senior officer told him to stop running an agent. He had spoken out anonymously before, but dropped his anonymity because he wanted the allegations to be investigated again.

It was alleged that extreme Ulster loyalists who were members of a child sex ring committing offences at the Home were being blackmailed by MI5 and other branches of the security forces during the Troubles. In 2015 campaigners were trying to have Kincora included in a wide-ranging inquiry to establish whether the security services prevented action on the abuse so they could compromise some of the perpetrators.

Journalist and author Chris Moore alleged that Mountbatten abused boys at Kincora and that MI5 repeatedly obstructed police investigations into the abuse of vulnerable children who lived there.

=== Legal proceedings ===
Until 2015, there had been no court hearing about the alleged cover-up with British state involvement, a cover-up that was alleged by victims to have lasted decades. An Independent Inquiry into Child Sexual Abuse in England and Wales was being set up at the time following revelations of widespread abuse in the aftermath of the Jimmy Savile revelations. However, the government intended to keep Kincora out of this process and within the remit of the HIA inquiry only. The Northern Ireland victims wanted a similar inquiry into their case, with fuller powers to compel witnesses to testify and require the security service to provide documents then available to the HIA. On 17 February 2015 the High Court in Northern Ireland listed a full judicial review into the decision to keep Kincora out of the wider inquiry, which was heard in the first week of June 2015.

On 20 January 2017, the HIA chairman Sir Anthony Hart dismissed claims that MI5 or any other British government agency had any role in covering up the reports of sex abuse which had occurred at Kincora and instead placed the blame on the poor investigating and reporting by the local police.

In October 2022, former resident Arthur Smyth issued a writ against the Department of Health, the Secretary of State for Northern Ireland, the Police Service of Northern Ireland, Belfast Health and Social Care Trust and the Business Services Organisation.

In June 2025, former resident Gary Hoy reached an undisclosed settlement with the PSNI and Home Secretary over claims that a housemaster who sexually abused children was protected because he was an MI5 agent. His legal team argued that authorities enabled William McGrath to target vulnerable victims to gather information about Tara, a far-right group in which McGrath was a leading member. His team alleged that this went as far as obstructing RUC investigations into McGrath because he was an MI5 agent. There were also claims of malfeasance in public office and negligence were also made as part of a larger action against the PSNI, Home Office and Department of Health. There was originally a three-day trial scheduled, but Mr. Hoys' legal team announced that proceedings were settled on confidential terms. No more details were disclosed and no admission of liability was made as part of the resolution. Mr Hoy said afterwards "This case was never about the money, it was about holding them to account". He also said "I have carried this burden since the age of 13; I never told anybody about it at the time, and I still have nightmares and flashbacks about the abuse".
