= John Watts (British Army officer) =

British Army officer (1930-2003)

Lieutenant-General Sir John Watts KBE CB MC
- Born: 27 August 1930
- Died: 10 December 2003 (aged 73)
- Military career
- Allegiance: United Kingdom
- Branch: British Army
- Service years: 1951–1987
- Rank: Lieutenant-General
- Service number: 415012
- Commands: Sultan of Oman's Land Forces; 22 Special Air Service Regiment
- Conflicts: Malayan Emergency; Jebel Akhdar campaign Indonesian Confrontation; Aden Emergency; Dhofar Counterinsurgency
- Awards: Knight Commander of the Order of the British Empire; Companion of the Order of the Bath; Military Cross; Mentioned in Despatches

Lieutenant-General Sir John Peter Barry Condliffe Watts, KBE, CB, MC (27 August 1930 – 10 December 2003) was a British Army officer who served as both Commanding Officer and Director of the SAS and became Chief of Defence Staff for the Sultan of Oman's Armed Forces.

He received the MC in 1959 for the assault on the Jebel Akhdar, and was appointed an OBE in 1972 for service during the Dhofar Counterinsurgency, and a CBE in 1979 for his role in combating international terrorism.

== Early life ==
Watts was brought up on the North-west frontier in India where he studied mountain warfare. One of his first jobs was as a bodyguard in South America. He was a short, stocky, swarthy man who cared nothing for his appearance, often with a home-rolled cigarette at the corner of his mouth.

Watts was educated at Westminster School, Phillips Academy in Andover, Massachusetts, and the Royal Military Academy Sandhurst.

== Military career ==
=== Before Jebel Akhdar ===
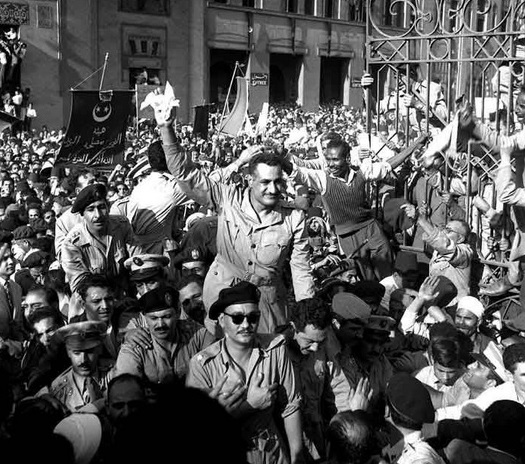
Egyptian Prime Minister Nasser welcomed by cheering crowds after signing of British withdrawal order, 1954

Watts was commissioned into the Royal Ulster Rifles (RUR) in February 1951, while the 1st battalion were fighting in Korea. After weapons training in the UK, Watts joined up with the battalion when it withdrew to Hong Kong in October 1951. More than 60 members of the battalion had died in Korea, with more than 30 still missing in action.

==== Suez ====
After two years in Hong Kong, he volunteered for a tour with the Parachute Regiment and joined the 3rd Battalion (3 Para) in Suez early in 1954, a year of political turmoil in Egypt as Colonel Gamal Abdel Nasser flexed his political muscles and began negotiations that led to the British withdrawal from Suez two years later. 3 Para was an elite unit within the 70,000 strong British garrison in the Canal Zone and would have served as a rapid deployment reserve in case of unrest.

==== Malaya ====
Towards the end of 1954 during the Malayan Emergency, the SAS sought to raise a new squadron from the Parachute Regiment, in part to replace a Rhodesian squadron that had finished its tour. The SAS at the time had a questionable reputation for lax discipline and its commanders did not find it easy to recruit from other regiments. Although the new squadron appeared to have come as a surprise to the Parachute Regiment, it was largely oversubscribed. Watts was selected and appointed a troop commander in the Independent Squadron, Parachute Regiment (22 SAS) in February 1955.

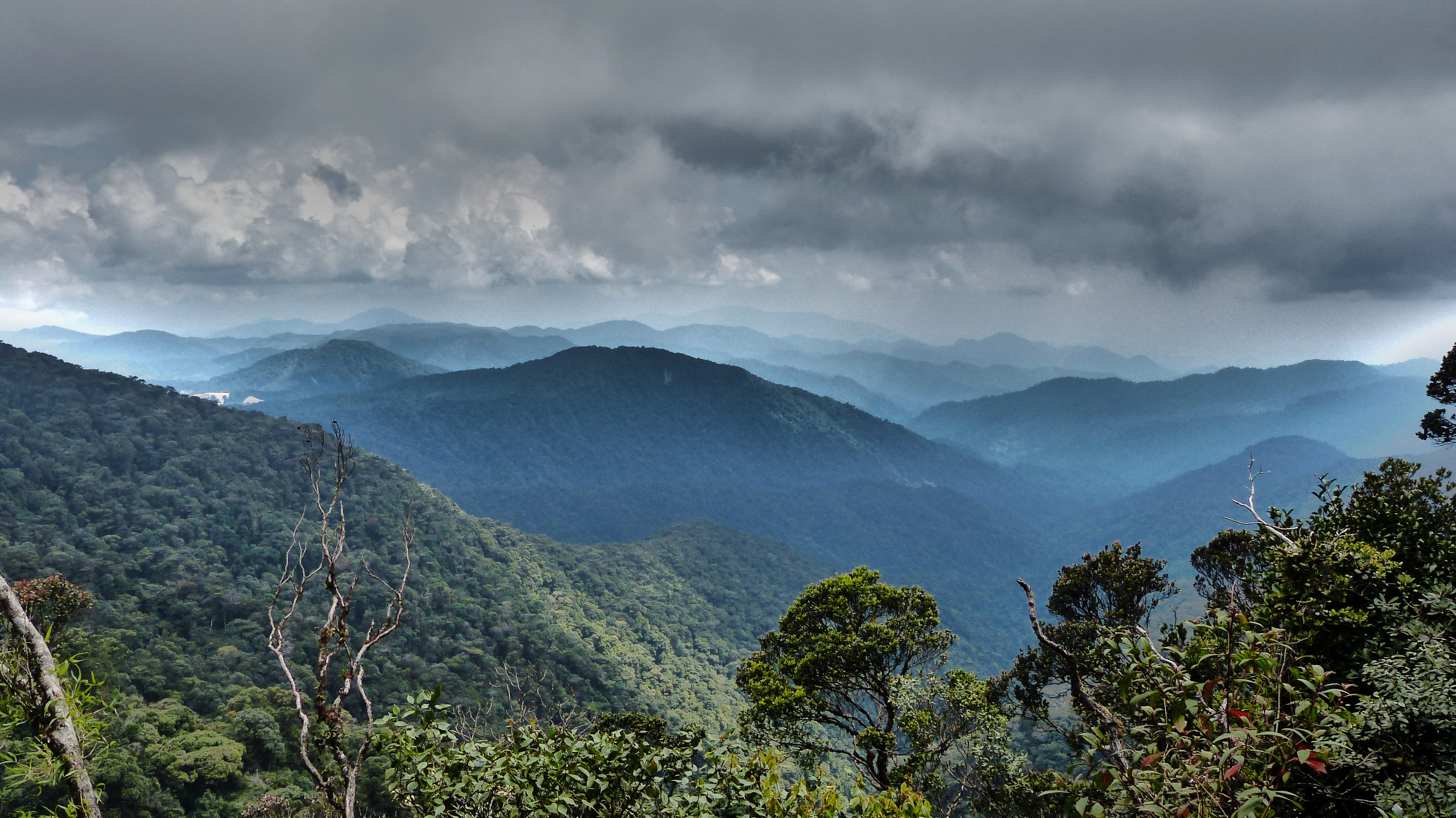
Cameron Highlands, Malaya, from its summit

The role of the SAS was to operate in deep jungle areas not already covered by other security forces, to conduct covert reconnaissance of guerrilla forces, their camps and sources of supply. Watts spent most of 1955 patrolling the Iskander swamps of southern Malaya and then the southern Selanger swamps of Tasek Bera. Most of the second year of the deployment was spent in the mountain area between Ipoh and the Cameron Highlands in the north. The emphasis was on reconnaissance and intelligence; no more than a handful of kills were recorded by the squadron during its posting.

With Malaya due to be granted its independence in August 1957, and most rebels captured, killed or persuaded to surrender, the Parachute squadron was disbanded in April 1957. Troops were returned to the UK and re-posted to their parent units. Watts's 1 RUR were deployed at the time in the Cyprus Emergency.

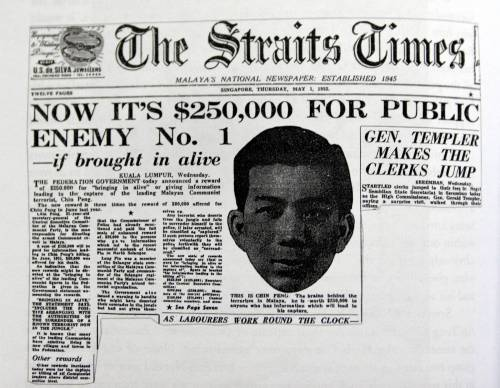
Chin Peng bounty, page 1 of The Straits Times, 1952

The remaining SAS squadrons in Malaya were also being wound down by 1957. B Squadron was in the process of being disbanded and its men absorbed by the under-strength A and D Squadrons. Despite this, Watts returned to Malaya, joining D Squadron, which he was commanding when the new 22 SAS Commanding Officer, Anthony Deane-Drummond, arrived in November 1957. Watts was now operating near the Malaya-Thai border in pursuit of Chin Peng, the leader of the Communist terrorists. Chin Peng had been trained by the British in WW2 and appointed an OBE for helping to fight the Japanese. Watts even experimented with using elephants to carry his squadron's supplies through the dense jungle. He was mentioned in despatches at the end of his tour.

=== Jebel Akhdar ===
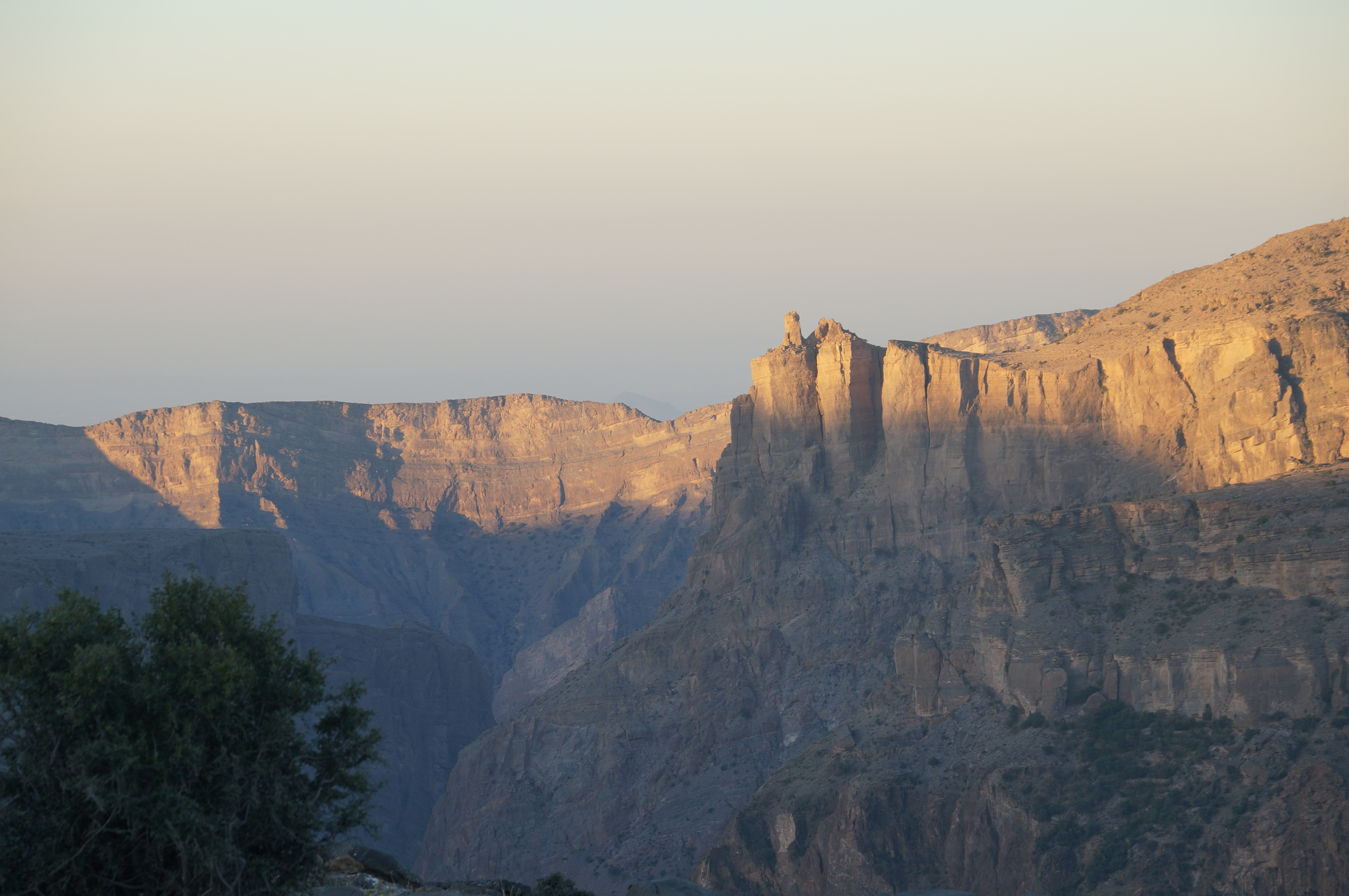
Cliffs high above Wadi Muaydin at sunrise, Jebel Akhdar, Oman

In October 1958, a message arrived for Deane-Drummond enquiring if the SAS could help fight rebels on a mountain called Jebel Akhdar in Oman. Watts and D Squadron were immediately recalled to Kuala Lumpur, and, after two weeks of training, arrived in Oman on 19 November to carry out an offensive recce of the mountain. The Jebel Akhdar is an 18 by 12-mile plateau standing 6,500 feet above sea level ringed by mountains reaching more than 8,000 feet in places.

Watts had no more than 60 fighting-ready troops, against more than 600 well trained rebels. The Jebel Akhdar had only ever been successfully taken twice before in six attempts: first by an army of 25,000 sent by the Caliphs of Baghdad in AD 892; and then by the Persians in AD 1265, when only 5,000 of the 20,000-strong attacking force survived.

The squadron carried out aggressive patrols from both sides of the mountain from 26 November to 27 December, successfully engaging the enemy and suffering only one casualty, shot dead by a sniper. Watts was in daily contact by wire and weekly by letter with Deane-Drummond in Kuala Lumpur. On 29 December approval was given for a second squadron to be sent to Oman. Deane-Drummond arrived with A Squadron on 12 January, and on the full moon of 25 January A and D Squadrons stormed the mountain, with A Squadron launching a diversionary attack. Watts and 21 other men from D Squadron gained control of the plateau in the early hours of 26 January and the battle was won. The only casualties were three wounded in A Squadron, two of whom subsequently died, after a bullet hit a grenade in a rucksack. Despite a media blackout, Deane-Drummond was given permission to brief The Times, which reported: “As for the enemy, they were conquered by surprise, not slaughter; a brilliant example of economy in the use of force”.

Watts was awarded the Military Cross for the "successful conduct of the opposed advance".

=== From Jebel Akhdar to Dhofar ===
After Jebel Akhdar, Watts rejoined the Royal Ulster Rifles. 1RUR had just returned from Cyprus (which had won independence at the end of the Cyprus Emergency) and was now starting a tour of duty in Germany within BAOR. He then began a period of intensive training, first at RMCS Shrivenam (The Royal Military College of Science), then in 1962 at the elite Staff College, Quetta, before being posted to HQ Berlin as GS02.

==== Borneo ====
In early 1964, Watts was called back to 22 SAS to train a new squadron for Borneo. The SAS had been heavily committed to Borneo for some time. The Regiment had only two ‘sabre’ (fighting) squadrons, and both had been in Borneo in 1963 helping to protect the 900-mile Borneo border from small, ill-trained and poorly armed gangs of Indonesian insurgents during the Indonesian Confrontation. President Sukarno of Indonesia objected to the ‘neocolonialist’ British plan to amalgamate the Federation of Malaya, Singapore and British Borneo (North Borneo and Sarawak) into the new country of Malaysia – the south of Borneo was, and still is, part of Indonesia.

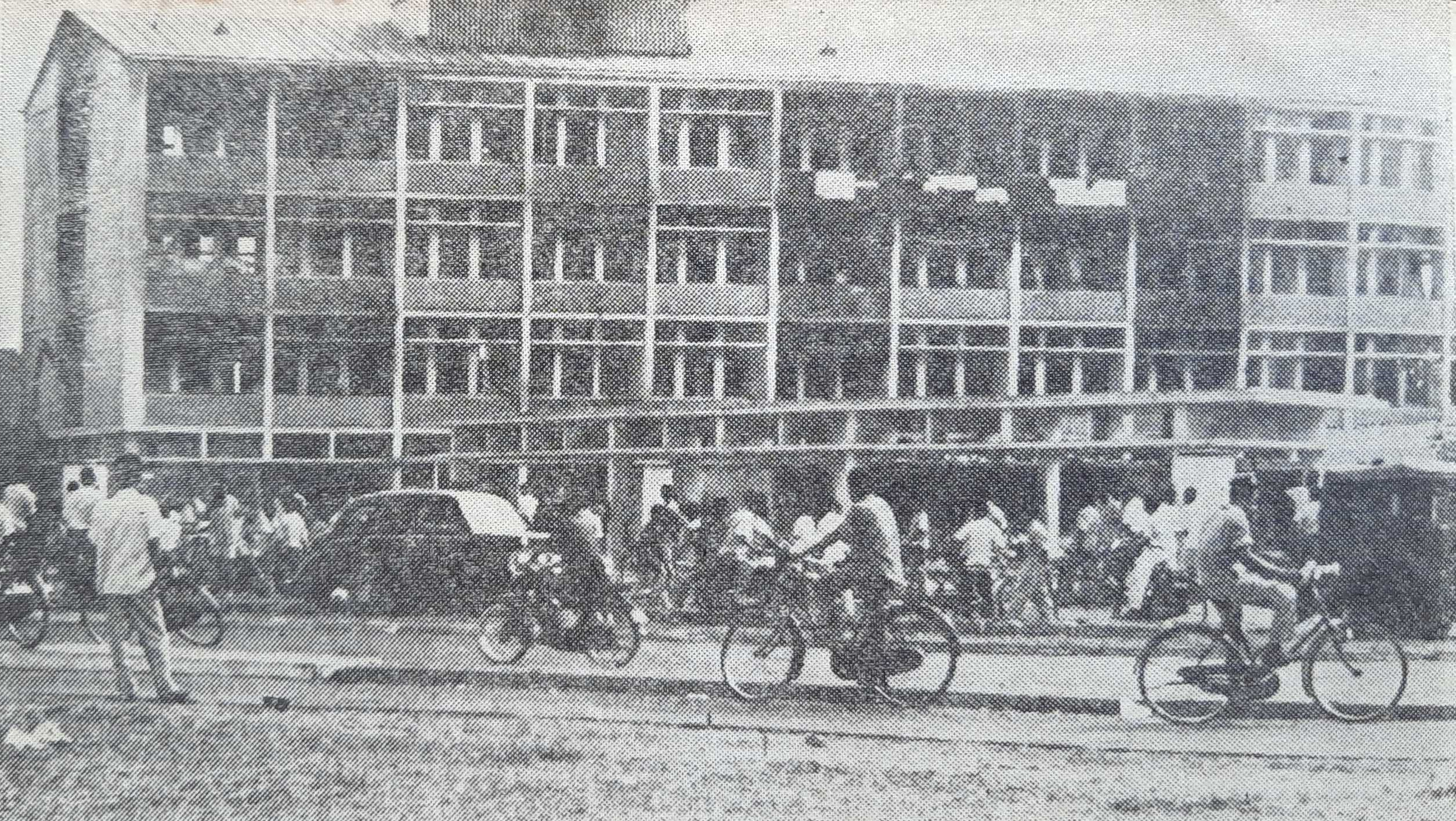
The British Embassy in Jakarta after being burned by demonstrators in 1963

In September 1963 the British embassy in Jakarta was stormed by angry Sukarno-supporting crowds. The crowds were confronted by the bagpipe-playing British Military Attaché, Rory Muir Walker, who coincidentally had been awarded the MC as Watts's second in command at Jebel Akhdar. The embassy was badly damaged. In an atmosphere of rising tension, the Indonesian government sent regular and elite soldiers (some of whom had been trained by US Special Forces) to fight alongside the border gangs in Borneo, and then in late 1964 trebled the strength of its forces, ‘outnumbering several times’ the British troops stationed there. It was against this backdrop that a third SAS squadron was requested by General Walter Walker, the Director of Operations in Borneo.

The CO of 22 SAS, John Woodhouse, who was a veteran of Malaya and architect of the SAS selection process, ensured that Watts was chosen to train and lead the new (re-formed) B Squadron. Timing was tight: conventional wisdom was that it took no less than three years to fully train an SAS soldier; all of B Squadron's troopers were new recruits. During training in the UK, reports were received from Borneo of increasing Indonesian aggression and SAS actions in which men had been killed. D Squadron arrived home exhausted. Watts took his new recruits to Brunei for final jungle training in October 1964, then in November started operations as part of the highly classified Operation Claret.

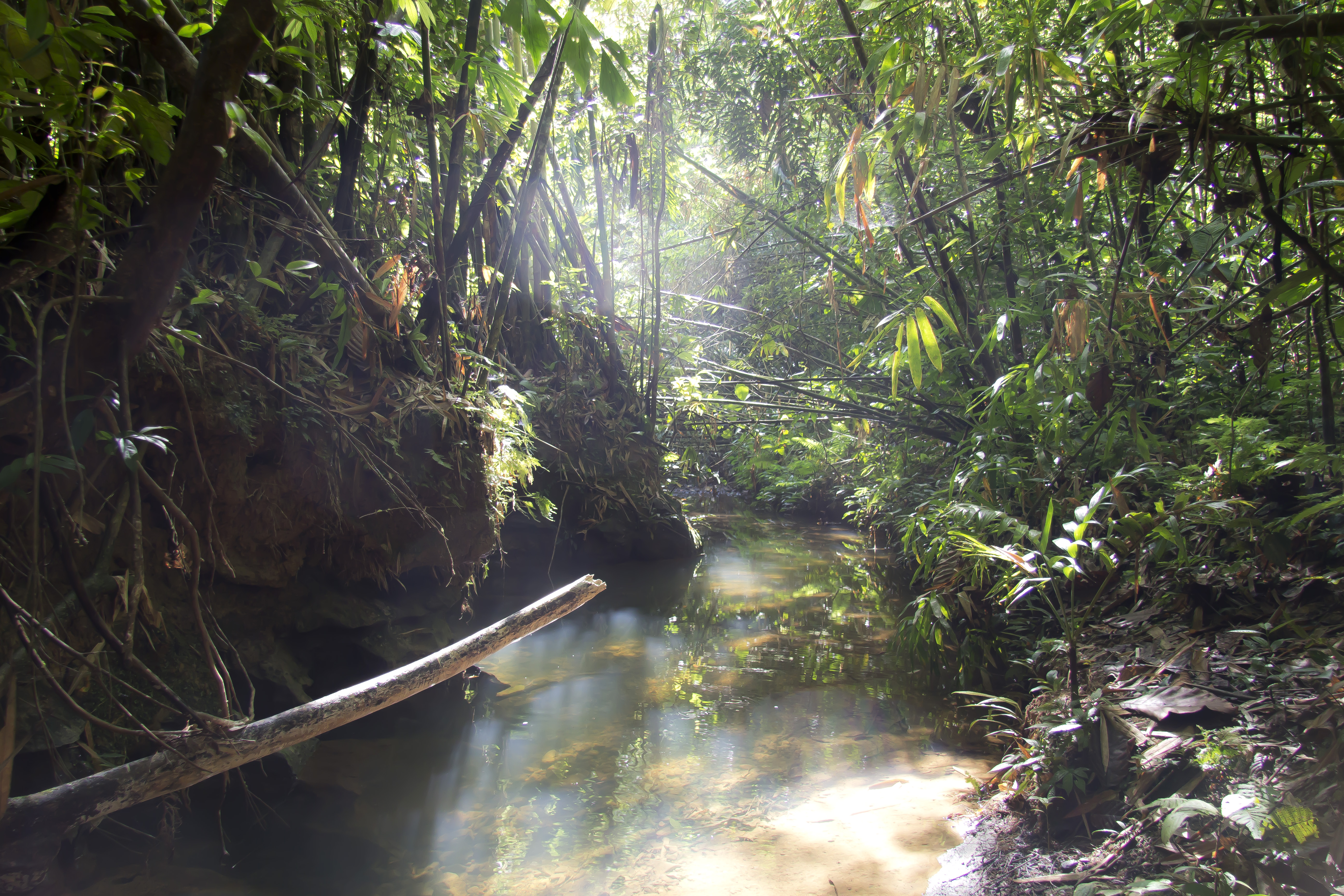
Jungle at Sarawak, Borneo

Under Operation Claret, Watts took his squadron up to six miles into the jungle across the Indonesian border, three times further than had been allowed before, to conduct covert reconnaissance so that British infantry and Gurkha units (which reported to Watts) could make ‘psychological rapier thrusts’ against Indonesian forces. The idea was to detect and engage infiltrators before they left Indonesian territory. SAS troops provided medical and other forms of assistance to indigenous tribes along the border to build trust and a network of local ‘eyes and ears’. Secrecy was paramount, as the British Government did not want this to be seen as an act of war against Indonesia.

Watts and B Squadron successfully completed their first tour in February 1965, with no casualties. A refreshed D Squadron returned to carry on their cross-border work. The operations of the SAS in Borneo helped to stabilize the situation until Indonesia fell apart after the October 1965 coup and subsequent Indonesian genocide. General Walker, who had requested the extra SAS squadron, later commented that "one SAS squadron with helicopters was worth ten infantry battalions to me". Denis Healey, the British Minister of Defence at the time, stated that Borneo was "a textbook demonstration of how to apply economy of force, under political guidance for political ends”.

==== Yemen ====
In 1965 Watts took B Squadron to Yemen during the Aden Emergency. It is not clear if this was principally for combat or for training, or if it was connected to the substantial number of British soldiers who were operating covertly in Yemen at the time as British-backed mercenaries. The previous year, A Squadron had lost two of its men while operating north of Aden in the Radfan mountains. They had been tasked with night reconnaissance in rebel territory to identify possible drop zones for the Parachute Regiment. The bodies of the two SAS men were decapitated and the heads displayed at a rebel stronghold inside Yemen.

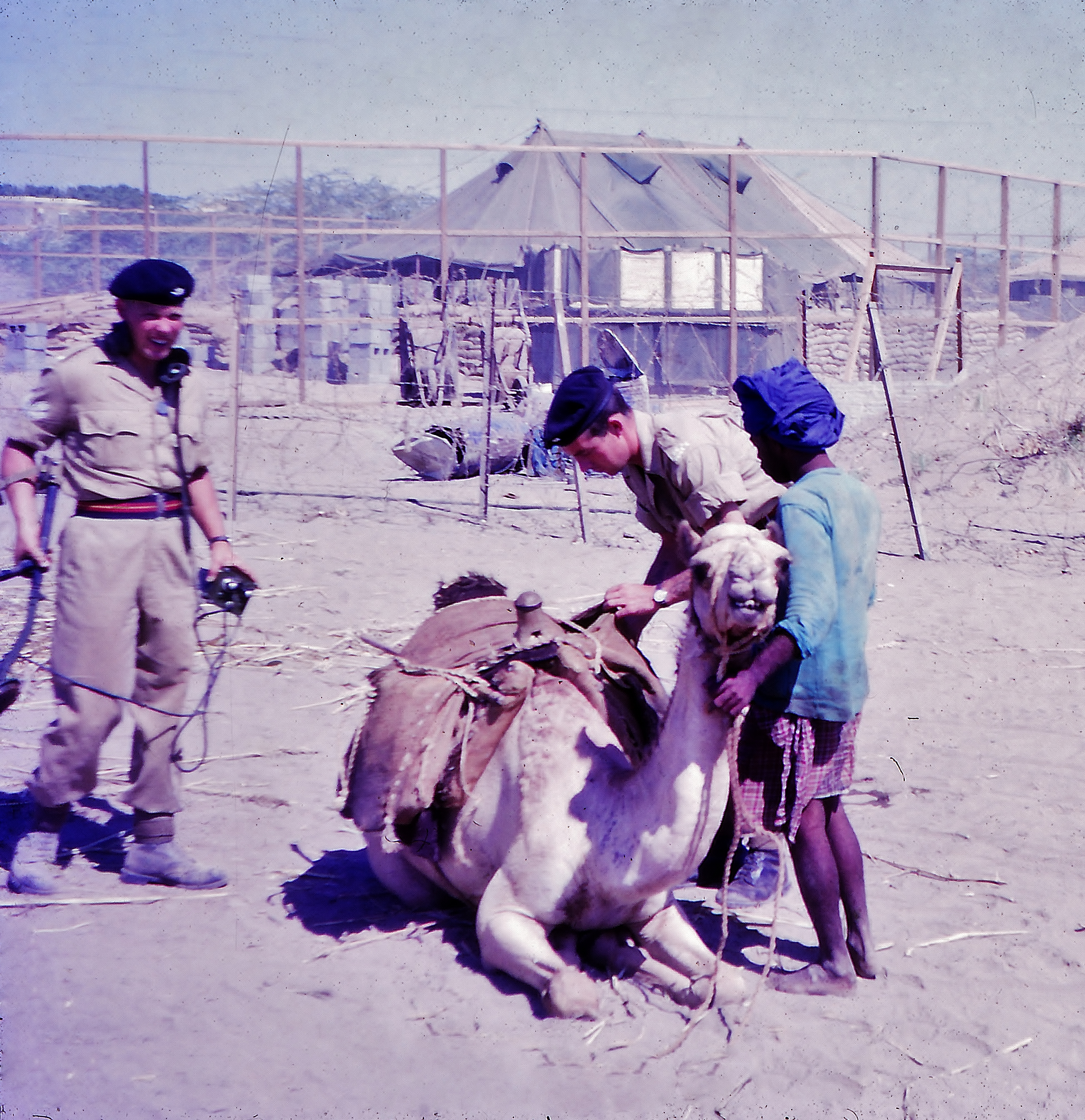
British troops with mine detector search a camel for illicit arms or explosives, Yemen 1966

An Intelligence Officer who had served as Staff Officer with HQ Middle East Land Forces in Aden between 1964 and 1966 described how his "friend Johnnie Watts" arrived in Radfan to find British forces operating east of the Dhala road (one of the old spice routes), targeting rebels. Watts ‘made his own intelligence’ and decided to take his squadron west of the road, where he identified and intercepted the rebels’ supply routes for Egyptian mines and heavy weaponry. His actions were successful in restricting rebel activity but were too small to have an impact on the outcome of the overall campaign. British withdrawal from Aden was announced by the British Government in February 1966 and completed in November 1967.

After Aden, Watts returned to 1RUR as a company commander for 18 months. 1RUR had just returned from Borneo to begin regular NATO duties in West Germany: training, field exercises, and maintaining infantry readiness in the Cold War theatre. He then attended the US Overseas Defence Course in Virginia.

==== Hong Kong ====
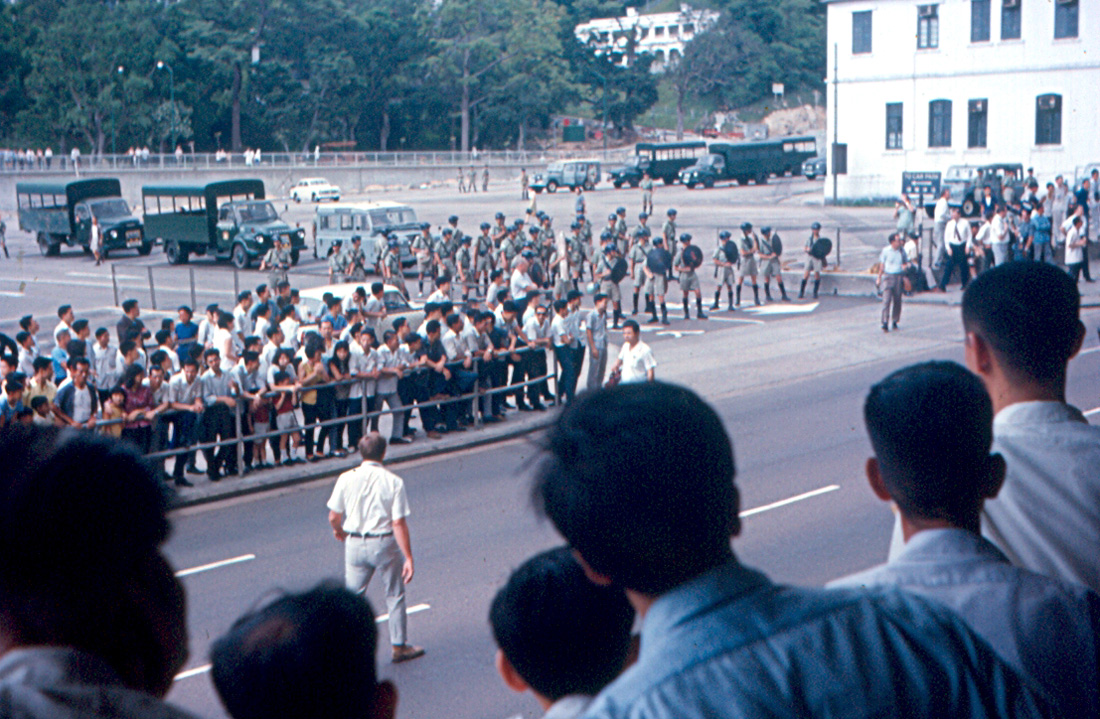
Confrontation between Hong Kong Police and rioters, May 1967

In 1967 he was sent to Hong Kong as brigade major of 48 Gurkha Infantry Brigade. 40 years later it was revealed that, against the back drop of the Cultural Revolution, a radical faction of the People's Liberation Army was poised to invade the British colony during the 1967 pro-communist riots. The invasion was called off only by a late-night order from Premier Zhou Enlai to the local army commander.

In July 1968 he was given an infantry battalion command with promotion to Lieutenant Colonel in the newly formed Royal Irish Rangers, again based in West Germany. In December 1969 he was appointed Commanding Officer of 22SAS, taking over from John Slim, who had served with the SAS in Malaya and Borneo.

=== Dhofar ===
In March 1970, three months after being appointed CO of 22SAS, Watts returned to Oman to carry out a covert assessment of the Dhofar Counterinsurgency. Problems in Dhofar had started in the early 1960s. Initially the rebels were Arab nationalists, but after the British withdrawal from Aden in 1967 and a Marxist state took over, the rebels began to receive Chinese and Russian weapons across the Yemeni border. Fighting intensified, and by 1970 communist-trained rebels were within mortaring distance of the RAF base at Salalah, on the Dhofar coast.

The rebels also had access to sophisticated propaganda: the documentary 'The Hour Of Liberation Has Arrived' was the first film directed by an Arab woman to be shown at Cannes and gives a remarkable Yemenite/Communist/Arab Nationalist/Feminist perspective on the Dhofar war in 1971. It was co-produced by Marxists in South Yemen, and makes clear their ambition to take the revolution beyond Oman. The British, only 10 years earlier the dominant military power in the Middle East, found themselves struggling in Dhofar, having already announced that they would close their last bases in the Gulf during 1971. They feared that Oman could turn into a ‘little Vietnam’, and that all the pro-Western monarchies in the Arabian Gulf could fall to communism.

Interviewed for a PhD paper in 1980, Watts described what he found when he arrived incognito in Dhofar in March 1970:

“I was horrified. The road was cut and the only resupply was by air or sometimes by sea…There were no Dhofaris in the Sultans Armed Forces (SAF), which was virtually an army of occupation. Everybody on the jebel [the mountains] was with the enemy, some convinced, some out of boredom, some intimidated: SAF had only a few Jebali [mountain] guides. It was crazy – we were on a hiding to nothing fighting a people. There were signs of counter-revolution, with Muslim-Communist arguments. The latter were better armed and organised and ruthless, absorbing some Dhofaris and shooting others. A clash was coming and therefore the Government had a chance of getting some Dhofaris on their side. The idea must be to pick up the Muslim rebellion, but to do this a national aim was needed.”

Watts proposed a ‘Five Point Plan’ for initial SAS assistance to the counterinsurgency, designed to give the Omanis sufficient time to implement social reforms. The key elements were:

1. An intelligence cell
2. An information team
3. A medical officer supported by SAS medics
4. A veterinary officer
5. When possible, the raising of Dhofari soldiers (“firqats”) to fight for the Sultan.

As in Malaya and Borneo before, intelligence was key. There would be a critical link between gaining support of the population, and receiving intelligence from them. Effective propaganda and the promise of social reforms might persuade Dhofaris to join with the Sultan.

Watts's plan drew heavily from British experience in Malaya, where the "hearts and minds" approach documented by Sir Robert Thompson emphasised political before military solutions. British diplomats had offered a copy of Thompson's book, 'Defeating Communist Insurgency', to the Sultan in Oman in 1966, hoping he would embrace reforms, but the Sultan refused. Watts's plan initially suffered a similar fate.

In July 1970, a palace coup removed the old Sultan and replaced him with his son, Sultan Qaboos. Qaboos had been educated in England, trained at Sandhurst, and served in the British Army.

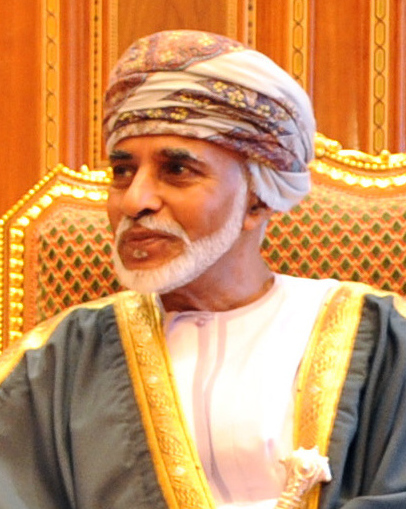
Qaboos bin Said, Sultan of Oman from 23 July 1970 until his death in 2020

Qaboos welcomed change. It was essential if the counterinsurgency was to have any chance of success. The ‘Watts plan’ was immediately approved and formed the blueprint for operations under his command, and for all subsequent commanders. The campaign has been described as the most important and far-reaching campaign ever fought by the SAS, and Britain's most clear-cut counter-insurgency victory since Malaya.

For the execution of the campaign, Watts was reunited with two of his troop commanders from the Jebel Akhdar assault 11 years before. Peter de la Billiere has described how his “whole horizon brightened” on returning to Oman, not least because he was once again working under the "irrepressibly enthusiastic" Watts, “a marvellous man to work for, in that he delegated responsibility fearlessly, never interfered with the work of a subordinate if things were going well, and was always looking for adventure”. Tony Jeapes describes the briefing he got from Watts before leaving Hereford for Oman, and says that “more than anyone else it was the strategy [Watts] had devised and the groundwork he had completed that led to the ultimate defeat of the enemy”. Jeapes, by then CO of 22SAS, was present at the final operation from Sarfait in 1976 which saw the defeat of the rebels and brought about the end of the six-year war.

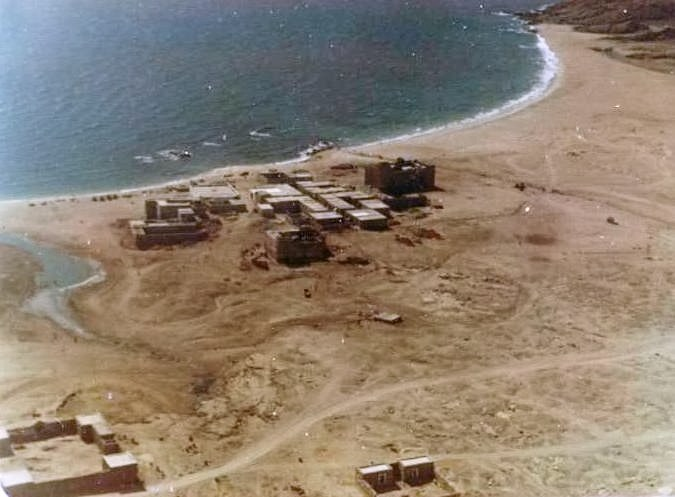
British base at Mirbat, the site of the Battle of Mirbat in July 1972

Throughout Qaboos’ counterinsurgency, the SAS was a facilitator. At its peak, the combined force fighting for the Sultan totalled around 15,000 men. Additional troops, air defence systems and helicopters were supplied by Iran, at the time a staunch ally of the west who had made it the foremost military power in the region. The SAS commitment was rarely more than a single squadron of about 80. The SAS did get involved in pitched battles, most famously at Mirbat in July 1972, but typically they were training and assisting the Sultan's forces. Over the course of the campaign, the SAS lost 12 men killed in action and several more permanently disabled.

Watts himself commanded initial SAS operations in Oman from 1970 to the end of 1971, taking the war to the rebels. He raised the ‘firqats’, secured key towns from the rebels, and, at 40 years of age, personally lead Omani forces on to the jebel to secure strategic bases.

Interviewed for the Imperial War Museum in 1992, an SAS Squadron Commander recalled an incident when he was serving with Watts, his Commanding Officer, in Dhofar in late 1971, during Operation Jaguar:

"He was a very unusual man. He bore personally the casualties we took – very personally, on his own shoulders. There was one incident where he was very closely involved, when one of our people, who had gone forward to try and protect some of the firqats, to give them covering fire when they had got themselves in a totally unnecessary exposed position – this chap, he got very badly wounded, and he eventually died of his wounds. The Commanding Officer was personally involved in getting him out of the very exposed position. Typically, the Commanding Officer didn't have any regard for his own personal safety. And immediately after this had happened, he came up to my position, and he was in quite a bad state, from the point of view he hadn't eaten for 3 or 4 days, and he was smoking a lot, and you could tell that he was taking the injury – which was a very severe head wound, to one of my people – very badly indeed. And this is typical of the man, I think that's why we all loved him so much, and why we would have followed him anywhere, because he was so personally involved in everything that happened. A very unusual man."

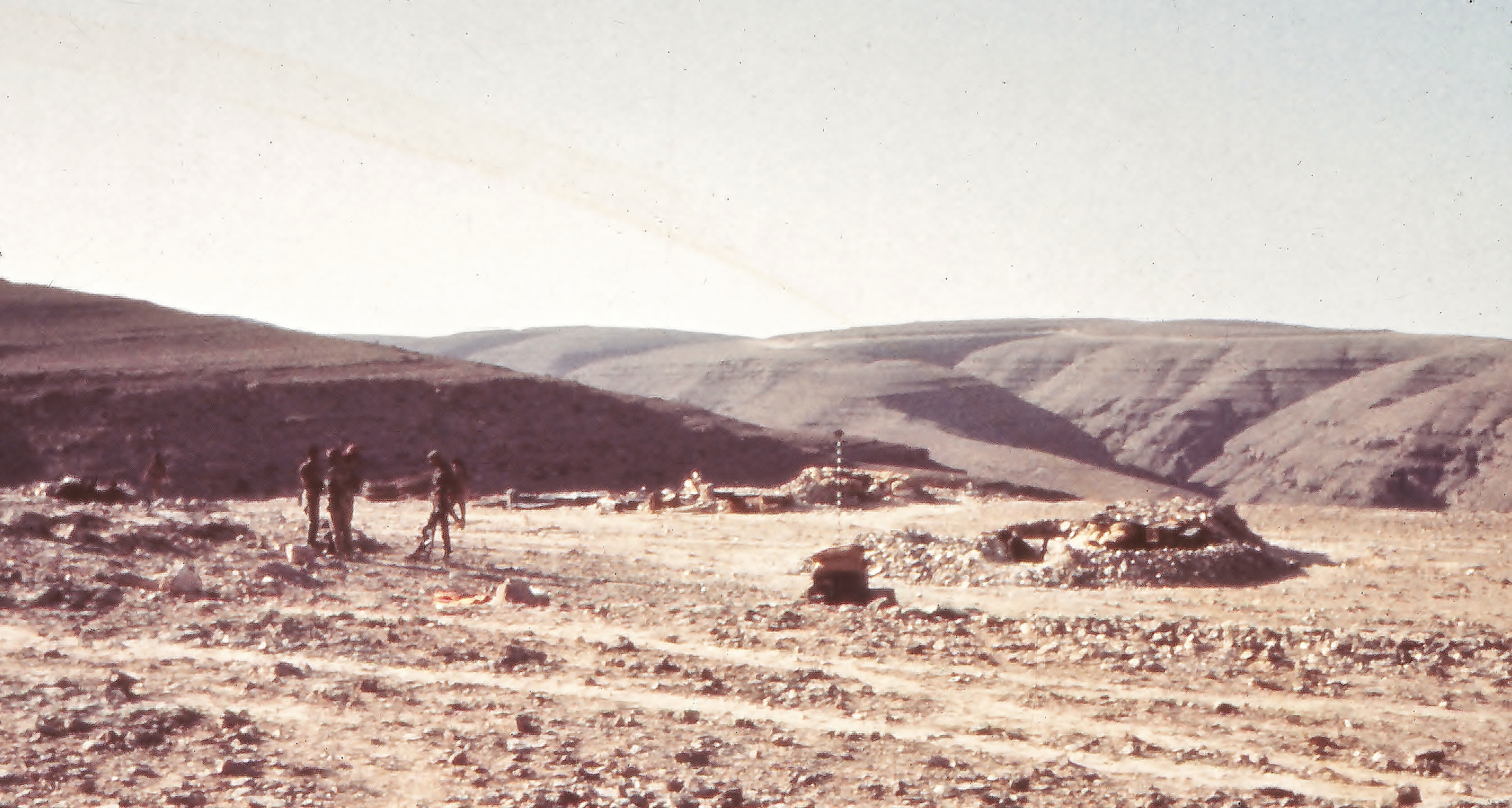
Dhofar, battalion position on the Omani–Yemeni border, 1972

In December 1971, Watts was in Dhofar directing offensive operations when he received a signal from the MoD telling him to return to the UK. His second in command, De la Billiere, took over operations as CO 22SAS from January 1972.

In January 1972, Watts was appointed an OBE for services as "an extremely brave and fearless commander" and "an outstanding tactician" in the Dhofar war.

=== After Dhofar ===
On return to the UK in 1972, Watts went to the Staff College, Camberley, as an instructor. Officers passing through the Staff College at the time included future 22SAS COs Michael Wilkes and Michael Rose. Watts was promoted to colonel and moved to the MoD in 1974.

In September 1975, Watts was promoted to brigadier and became Director SAS, taking over from John Simpson, an SAS stalwart who Watts knew well. As Director of the SAS Group, his responsibilities included not just 22SAS but also its two Territorial regiments. He took over the SAS at a challenging, politically charged time, with growing unrest in Northern Ireland and a surge in global terrorism – and when British army officers often found themselves in the news.

In 1970, Brigadier Frank Kitson published an influential book, Low Intensity Operations, setting out his views on British counter-insurgency experience. Some saw this as a blueprint for a security state which Kitson then tested in Northern Ireland between 1970 and 1973. After 1 Para, nicknamed "Kitson's Private Army", was involved in the Bloody Sunday massacre in 1972, the Irish Republicans fixed on Brigadier Kitson, elevating him to one of their central hate figures. Kitson and Watts had their differences on how to conduct a counterinsurgency: Kitson wrote in 1977 that "Oman was not as significant in developing my ideas as either Kenya or Malaya"; and when plans were put forward for the Jebel Akhdar assault based on Kitson's experience in Kenya, the SAS CO Anthony Dean-Drummond observed that they were "received with considerable scepticism" and "did not match up with local conditions" – the SAS plan was "strongly favoured by all those present".

In 1974, the political activities of SAS founder David Stirling and retired General Walter Walker (who was in charge of operations when Watts was in Borneo) also hit the headlines, fuelling rumours of private armies and military coups, and prompting one of Watts's former commanding officers in the SAS to send a letter, which he subsequently published, distancing himself from Stirling. In early September 1974, the Defence Secretary wrote to the Prime Minister assuring him that Walker did not speak for serving officers.

Ironically, public fears had been heightened by the sight of the SAS and army practising anti-terrorist responses at Heathrow airport four times during 1974; the SAS had set up a specialist anti-terrorist unit in September 1972 following the Munich Olympics massacre. The fear on the left was that anti-terrorism provided the pretext for increased authoritarianism, and a possible military take-over.

==== Northern Ireland ====
There are two overlapping perspectives on Watts's role in Northern Ireland: a long-term perspective, looking at a conflict that ranged from 1969 to 2007; and a short-term perspective revolving around the high-profile public commitment of the SAS to Northern Ireland between 1976 and 1978.

Taking a long-term perspective, British troops were first deployed in Northern Ireland in August 1969 as public disorder became commonplace. The British army were unprepared for what was to follow: no one expected an insurgency in 1969, and intelligence was woefully inadequate. The army resorted to heavy-handed tactics taken from its post-colonial experience, for example ‘deep interrogation’ and internment. This led to unprecedented levels of violence in the province.

A covert intelligence gathering operation, MRF, was set up in 1971 by the army, but was compromised and had to be shut down in 1973. Subsequent intelligence operations proliferated, were poorly coordinated, and inefficient. According to one commentator, “by mid 1978 an IRA suspect might have been under observations from one of 14 Company's three detachments, one of four SAS troops, or the seven Army Close Observation Platoons, the Special Patrol Group's Bronze Section, or one of several squads from E4A…their use…driven by the personalities of various security chiefs”.

Throughout the 1970s there was a gradual transition from army-controlled counter-insurgency to police-controlled counter-terrorism. In 1977, a new policy of "police primacy" put the RUC at the forefront of security operations, reducing the regular Army's role, and centring security policy on separating terrorists from their communities. Operations eventually became "intelligence-led" and "intelligence-driven" to an extent far greater than seen in any other British counter-insurgency operation. By the end of the 1970s, 1 in 8 of British regular army personnel in Northern Ireland were directly involved in intelligence operations.

The SAS had a covert role in Northern Ireland throughout the 1970s. There was such sensitivity about their public deployment that when they became responsible for selection and training of the Special Reconnaissance Unit (SRU), set up in 1973, they did so from bases in England. The SRU later became known as the 14th Intelligence Company, and then the Intelligence and Security Group (ISG), or Company. SAS troops may have been ‘re-cap-badged’ to take part in these and other operations. Activities from this time are deliberately murky, details are hard to verify, and even today there are conflicting accounts. Watts would have been one of the people overseeing these covert activities in his role as Director SAS from 1975 to 1979 (and perhaps earlier when at the MoD in 1974).

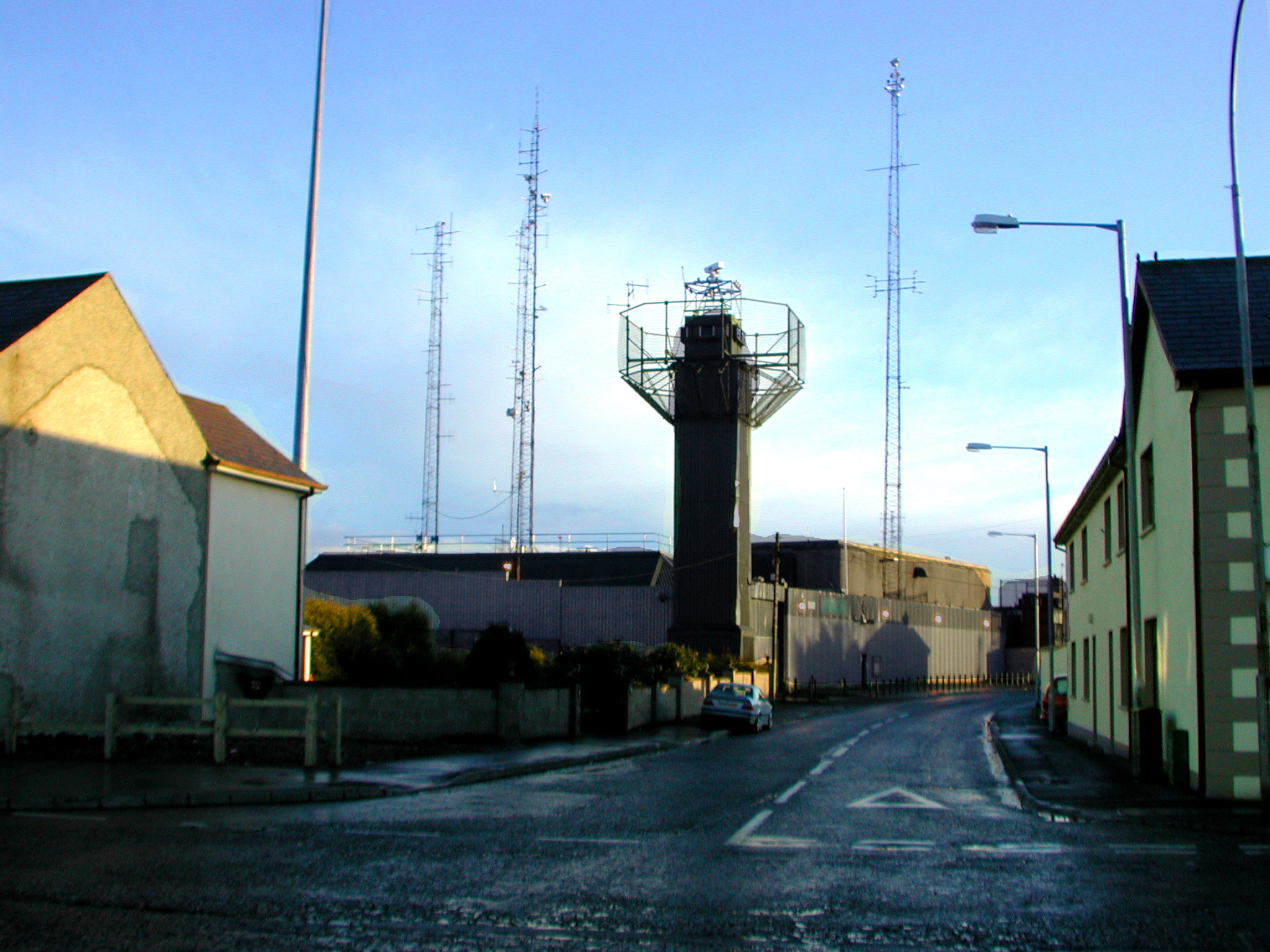
RUC Police Station in Crossmaglen, South Armagh

Taking a short-term perspective, the SAS began a public deployment in South Armagh in 1976 which, uniquely in his career, placed Watts in the public spotlight. On 7 January 1976 the Prime Minister, Harold Wilson, publicly announced that the SAS were being sent to Bessbrook in South Armagh for ‘patrolling and surveillance tasks’. The selection of Bessbrook was symbolic: in the six months before the SAS arrived, Protestant and Catholic death squads had killed 24 civilians. After five Catholics were killed by Protestant terrorists, a bus carrying men home from work was stopped and eleven Protestants gunned down. Most of the men came from Bessbrook.

The public decision to send the SAS to Bessbrook was an unprecedented, hurriedly implemented, and essentially political act, taken because the British government needed to be seen to be doing something about terrorist violence. The regular Army was not universally happy about the surprise deployment and was initially reluctant to share intelligence. The RUC (the police force) also had reservations.

Former SAS soldiers have described the deployment as a classic example of how not to use special forces, contradicting almost every accepted principle for their successful use. Some even believe the commitment was made without warning or reference to the Ministry of Defence. Merlyn Rees, the Northern Ireland Secretary at the time, later reflected that the commitment of the SAS had not been clearly thought through: “It was more presentational and mystique-making than anything else”.

After Harold Wilson unexpectedly stood down as Prime Minister in April 1976, the new Secretary of State for Northern Ireland, Roy Mason, took an aggressive stance on paramilitary organisations and said that he intended to squeeze the IRA "like a tube of toothpaste". SAS operations increased, causing more controversy.

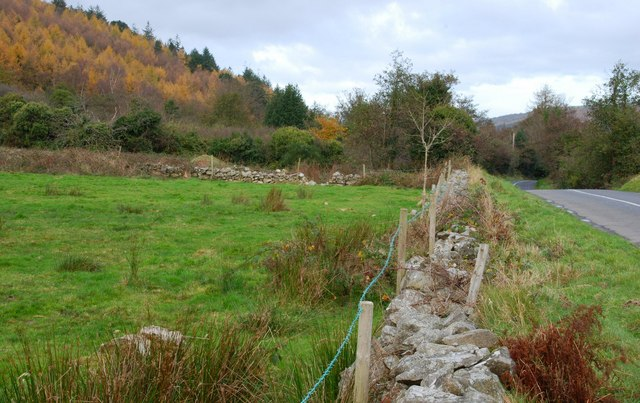
Flagstaff road along Cornamucklagh, where the SAS team was stopped by the Gardai and Irish Army

The chaotic situation became visible to all on 5 May 1976, when eight heavily armed SAS soldiers in unmarked cars were apprehended by Irish Police on the Irish side of the border. Although the usual practice was to send back security forces who had made an accidental border crossing, in this case the men were arrested and held to be in breach of Irish Law. The soldiers agreed to attend the court in Dublin if Watts would go with them. He personally took on the duty of escorting the soldiers to Dublin, visited them in their cells, and sat with them in open court. A year later the soldiers were tried in Dublin with the charge of possessing arms with intent to endanger life and fined £100.

The SAS presence in Northern Ireland increased as troops returned from Dhofar. Four troops were distributed around the province, reporting to army battalion commanders, some of whom may have seen the SAS as an answer to their IRA problems. In July 1978, a 16-year-old was shot dead by the SAS ambushing a weapons cache. Two SAS soldiers were tried for murder in a Northern Ireland court. They were acquitted when the intention to kill could not be proven. Republicans were outraged, SAS soldiers felt let down by their commanders. By the end of 1978, after the first two years of a regular, publicised SAS presence in the province, ten people had been killed, seven were IRA members, but three were mere bystanders, raising difficult and enduring questions about human rights and the rule of law.

In 1978, a group was established to coordinate SAS activities across the whole of the province. From 1979 to 1983, the SAS Regiment killed nobody in Northern Ireland.

==== International Terrorism ====
At the same time as directing SAS operations in Northern Ireland, Watts had to deal with the growth of international terrorism.

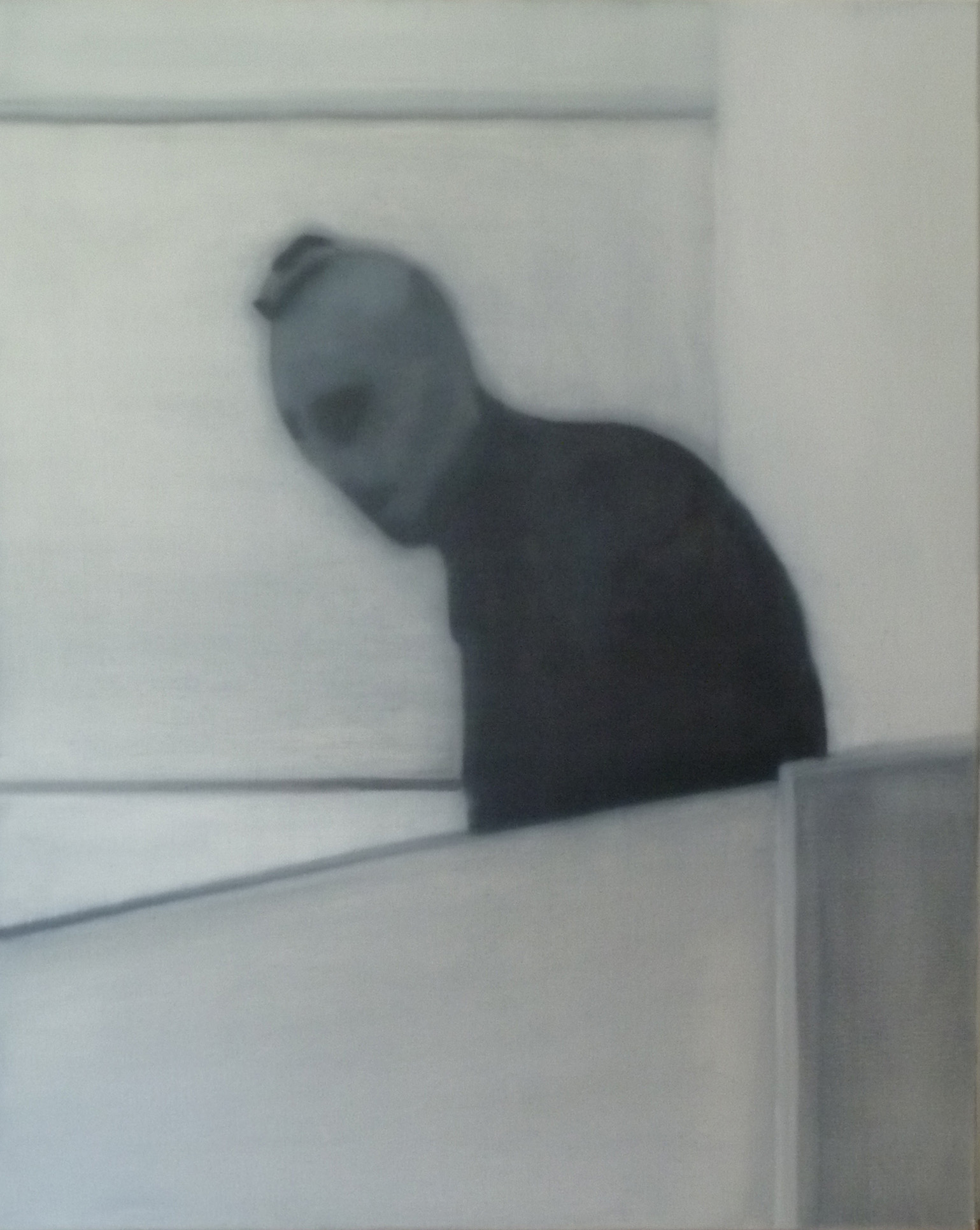
"Terrorist" (2013), oil on canvas by the Belgian artist Xavier Tricot, inspired by an image from the 1972 Munich massacre

Following the Munich Olympics massacre of September 1972, the British government had developed contingency plans to ensure that Whitehall, police constabularies and the armed forces were prepared for similar crises affecting the UK. The SAS anti-terrorist team set up in 1972 was first deployed operationally in January 1975 when a civilian airliner was hijacked at Manchester Airport by an Iranian student with a pistol. During the December 1975 Balcombe Street siege, existence of an SAS anti-siege unit was broadcast live on the BBC for the first time, at the instigation of the government.

In July 1976, the Israeli Special Forces unit, Sayeret Matkal, rescued 102 Israeli and Jewish hostages from Entebbe, Uganda following the hijack of an Air France flight from Tel Aviv by Palestinian and German terrorists. Following the hijack, the SAS invited representatives of Sayeret Matkal to Hereford.

On 13 October 1977, Palestinian terrorists hijacked Lufthansa Flight 181 flying from Spain to Germany, intending to force the German government to release the leadership of the Baader-Meinhof terrorist group from prison. On 14 October, the founder and commander of the Federal German counterterrorist squad GSG-9, Colonel Ulrich Wegener, was invited by the Prime Minister to meet senior SAS officers at 10 Downing Street. When the GSG-9 successfully stormed the airliner at Mogadishu, Somalia, four days later, they were accompanied by two members of the SAS. One was the former commander of G Squadron who had fought under Watts in Dhofar.

After Mogadishu, the MoD was inundated with so many requests for assistance and training from foreign governments that it had to turn some requests down, for lack of resources. Relationships were established with at least a dozen countries to assist with the development of special forces units (there is no record that this included Ireland). As a result, the government ordered an expansion of the UK's counter-terrorist role, and a full squadron was deployed at Hereford on rotation. The squadron's first major assignment was the Iranian Embassy siege in London on 13 April 1980.

Charlie Beckwith, the founder of the US Special Forces unit Delta Force, recalls in his memoir the advice he got from Watts in 1976 when planning the creation of the unit. He also describes how he thought of Watts before setting out on his first covert mission in 1980 in the Gulf:

“”…I’d been thinking that day about Johnny Watts… If he had known we were in Masirah, I felt sure he would have greeted us as we deplaned – dressed in full battle gear, demanding to be taken along. As a Brigadier in the SAS, he had spent many hours helping me form the ideas that lead to Delta. It was appropriate that afternoon to feel close to him.”

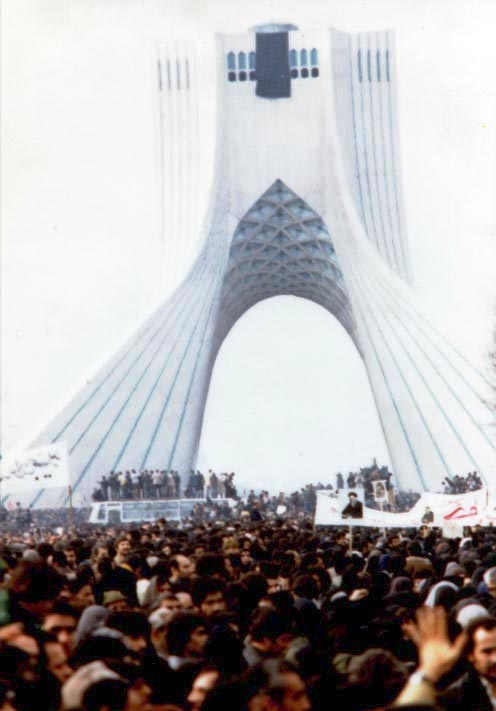
Mass protest held in front of Shahyad Tower, Tehran, during the 1979 Iranian Revolution

In 1979, Watts was appointed a CBE for his actions as Director of the SAS "for three years when the role of that service has had to alter significantly to meet increases in world terrorism". The citation mentions Northern Ireland and Mogadishu, and continues: "The planning for this alteration in role has started and has proved successful during his tenure of office". It concludes: "His work has involved negotiation and international advice in many countries beyond normal demands of a brigadier. Few officers have done so much to contribute to the overall defeat of terrorism."

In January 1979, the Iranian Revolution overthrew the pro-Western regime of the Shah that had stood for more than 25 years, and established the Islamic Republic that endures to this day. In April 1979, Watts returned to Oman as Head of the Sultan of Oman's Land Forces in the rank of Major General. Part of his role was to facilitate the redeployment of the US military following the revolution in Iran, with carrier task groups, tactical flying wings, and thousands of US troops arriving in Oman. He became Chief of Defence Staff Oman in 1984 in the rank of Lieutenant General. He retired in 1987.

== Significance and Legacy ==
=== Development of the SAS ===
Watts played a leading role in the development of the SAS during the Cold War. The success of the Jebel Akhtar campaign in Oman was critical to the survival of the SAS after its return to the UK in 1959. By 1958, the Malayan Emergency was coming to an end, and the SAS – re-formed after WW2 specifically for Malaya – had already been run down from five squadrons in 1954 to, in effect, two – D Squadron, led by Watts, and A Squadron, led by Johnny Cooper, (a veteran of David Stirling's original SAS unit in North Africa in 1941). The two Squadrons set out from Malaya to Oman expecting to be disbanded on their return to the UK.

The Jebel Akhtar success would have been noted at the highest levels within British Government and intelligence circles. Also in Oman for the operation were SOE veteran Colonel David Smiley, who liaised with influential politicians Julian Amery and Christopher Soames; and Major Frank Kitson, who briefed the Foreign Office and the Chief of Defence Staff, Sir William Dickson, before the campaign. Smiley also developed a close working relationship with Norman Darbyshire, the MI6 officer in Bahrain who was instrumental in the 1953 coup in Iran. To those watching, the Jebel Akhtar operation proved that the SAS could respond quickly and flexibly in a new environment with relatively few resources and with minimal publicity.

As a result, on return to the UK after Jebel Akhtar, the SAS were set up at a new base at Hereford and were given a new Cold War role. The squadrons started a wide-ranging training programme ‘for the mountains, for the jungle, for the arctic and for the desert’. An SAS soldier in 1962 recalls taking part in operations in 13 different countries in the first 8 months of the year. By the late 1960s, the SAS had effectively become the overt/covert special operations arm of MI6 and the Foreign Office. Watts and two junior officers also decorated at Jebel Akhtar (Jeapes and de la Billiere) went on to lead 22SAS continuously from 1969 to 1977; Watts and de la Billiere also served consecutively as Director SAS from 1975 to 1983.

=== Dhofar Counterinsurgency ===
Watts was the architect of one of the Cold War's most successful and consequential counterinsurgencies. The counterinsurgency war waged by Sultan Qaboos with his British advisors is now regarded as one of the most successful counterinsurgency operations since the Second World War, and possibly the most successful counterinsurgency in history. It is referred to as a textbook case taught in military academies around the world.

The defeat of the insurgency had long lasting and profound effects in Oman and beyond, creating relative stability in a critical area of the Middle East. Strategically, it is seen as one of the most important conflicts of the 20th century, arguably of greater strategic significance than Vietnam. Its significance was amplified by the seismic shock to regional stability delivered by the Islamic Revolution in Iran in January 1979. Watts, by then Director of the SAS, returned to Oman in April 1979 and remained there, at the Sultan's insistence, until he retired in 1987. Oman today remains one of the most stable countries in the Middle East, including – uniquely – having sound working relationships with Saudi Arabia, Iran and Israel.

== Family ==
Watts was married to Mary Flynn; they had four sons and three daughters. Watts was in the jungle in Malaya when he received news of the birth of his first child. The regimental journal records: "Shortly after the arrival of a telegram announcing the birth of his first offspring, Lieutenant Watts reported seeing numerous elephants and rhinoceroses on his patrols. We often wonder how large a part airdrop ration rum played in these observations, realising of course, that some celebration would obviously take place".

The marriage was dissolved in 1986. He subsequently married Diana Walker. In retirement, Watts read history and lived in a village in Wiltshire until his death in 2003.

His medals were put up for auction on 3 June 2025 at Woolley & Wallis auction house in Salisbury, Wiltshire. The lot was withdrawn from sale a few days before the auction.

== Sources ==
- Beckwith, Charlie (1985). Delta Force: United States Counter Terrorist Unit and the Iranian Hostage Rescue Mission (2nd ed.). Fontana. ISBN 978-0006367758.
- Bevins, Vincent (2020). The Jakarta Method: Washington's Anticommunist Crusade and the Mass Murder Program that Shaped Our World (1st ed.). PublicAffairs. ISBN 978-1541742406.
- Charters, David (2009). The Development of British Counter-Insurgency Intelligence. Journal of Conflict Studies Volume 29, Spring 2009. ISSN 1715-5673.
- Cobain, Ian (2017). The History Thieves: Secrets, Lies and the Shaping of a Modern Nation (2nd ed.). Granta Books. ISBN 978-1846275852.
- Cormac, Rory (2018). Disrupt and Deny: Spies, Special Forces, and the Secret Pursuit of British Foreign Policy (1st ed.). Oxford University Press. ISBN 978-0198784593.
- Deane-Drummond, Anthony (1992). Arrows of Fortune. Leo Cooper. ISBN 978-0850523232.
- De la Billiere, Peter (1994). Looking For Trouble. BCA. ISBN 978-0002552455.
- Dickens, Peter (1983). S.A.S.: The Jungle Frontier - 22nd Special Air Service Regiment in the Borneo Campaign, 1963-66 (1st ed.). Book Club Associates. ISBN 978-0853685975.
- Dorril, Stephen (2000). MI6: Inside the Covert World of Her Majesty's Secret Intelligence Service (1st ed.). Free Press. ISBN 978-0743203791.
- Fiennes, Ranulph (2020). The Elite: The Story of Special Forces – From Ancient Sparta to the War on Terror (2nd ed.). Simon & Schuster. ISBN 978-1471156632.
- Gardiner, Ian (2006). In the Service of the Sultan: A first-hand account of the Dhofar Insurgency (1st ed.). Pen and Sword Military. ISBN 978-1844154678.
- Gearson, John (2022). Operation Banner Primer: An Account of the British Military's Deployment to Northern Ireland, 1969-2007 (PDF). King's College London, Centre for Defence Studies.
- Geraghty, Tony (1992). Who Dares Wins: The SAS, 1950 to the Gulf War (3rd ed.). Time Warner Books UK. ISBN 978-0316903240.
- Healey, Denis (1990). The Time Of My Life (1st ed.). Penguin. ISBN 978-0140153941.
- Hoe, Alan (2019). Keystone of 22 SAS: The Life and Times of Lieutenant Colonel J M (Jock) Woodhouse MBE MC (1st ed.). Pen and Sword Military. ISBN 978-1526745057.
- Holman, Dennis (1958). Noone Of The Ulu (3rd ed.). The Travel Book Club. ISBN 978-0195826104.
- Hughes, Geraint (2014). Skyjackers, jackals and soldiers: British planning for international terrorist incidents during the 1970s (PDF). International Affairs (London), 90(5). doi:10.1111/1468-2346.12154.
- Jeapes, Tony (1980). SAS Operation Oman (3rd ed.). William Kimber. ISBN 978-0718300180.
- Jones, Clive (2020). The Clandestine Lives of Colonel David Smiley: Code Name 'Grin' (Intelligence, Surveillance and Secret Warfare) (1st ed.). Edinburgh University Press. ISBN 978-1474441162.
- Kitson, Frank (1977). Bunch Of Five (1st ed.). Faber & Faber. ISBN 978-0571149803.
- Kitson, Frank (1971). Low Intensity Operations : Subversion, Insurgency and Peacekeeping (1st ed.). Gardners Books. ISBN 978-0571161812.
- Large, Lofty (1999). Soldier Against The Odds (2nd ed.). Mainstream Publishing. ISBN 978-1840181432.
- MacKenzie, Alastair (2011). Special Force: The Untold Story of 22nd Special Air Service Regiment (SAS) (1st ed.). I. B. Tauris. ISBN 978-1848850712.
- Purdon, Corran (1993). List The Bugle: Reminiscences Of An Irish Soldier (1st ed.). Greystone Books. ISBN 978-1870157193.
- Strawson, John (1984). A History of the S.A.S. Regiment (2nd ed.). Secker & Warburg. ISBN 978-0436499920.
- Thompson, Robert (1966). Defeating Communist Insurgency: Experiences From Malaya and Vietnam (1st ed.). Chatto & Windus. ISBN 978-0701111335.
- Urban, Mark (1992). Big Boys' Rules: The Secret Struggles Against the IRA (1st ed.). Faber & Faber. ISBN 978-0571161126.

Military offices
Preceded by John Simpson	Director SAS; 1975–1979	Succeeded by Peter de la Billière
Preceded by Timothy Creasey	Chief of Staff of the Sultan's Armed Forces; 1984–1987	Succeeded by Hamid bin Said bin Mohammed Al Aufi
