= Red Hand Commando =

Ulster loyalist paramilitary group

Red Hand Commando (RHC)
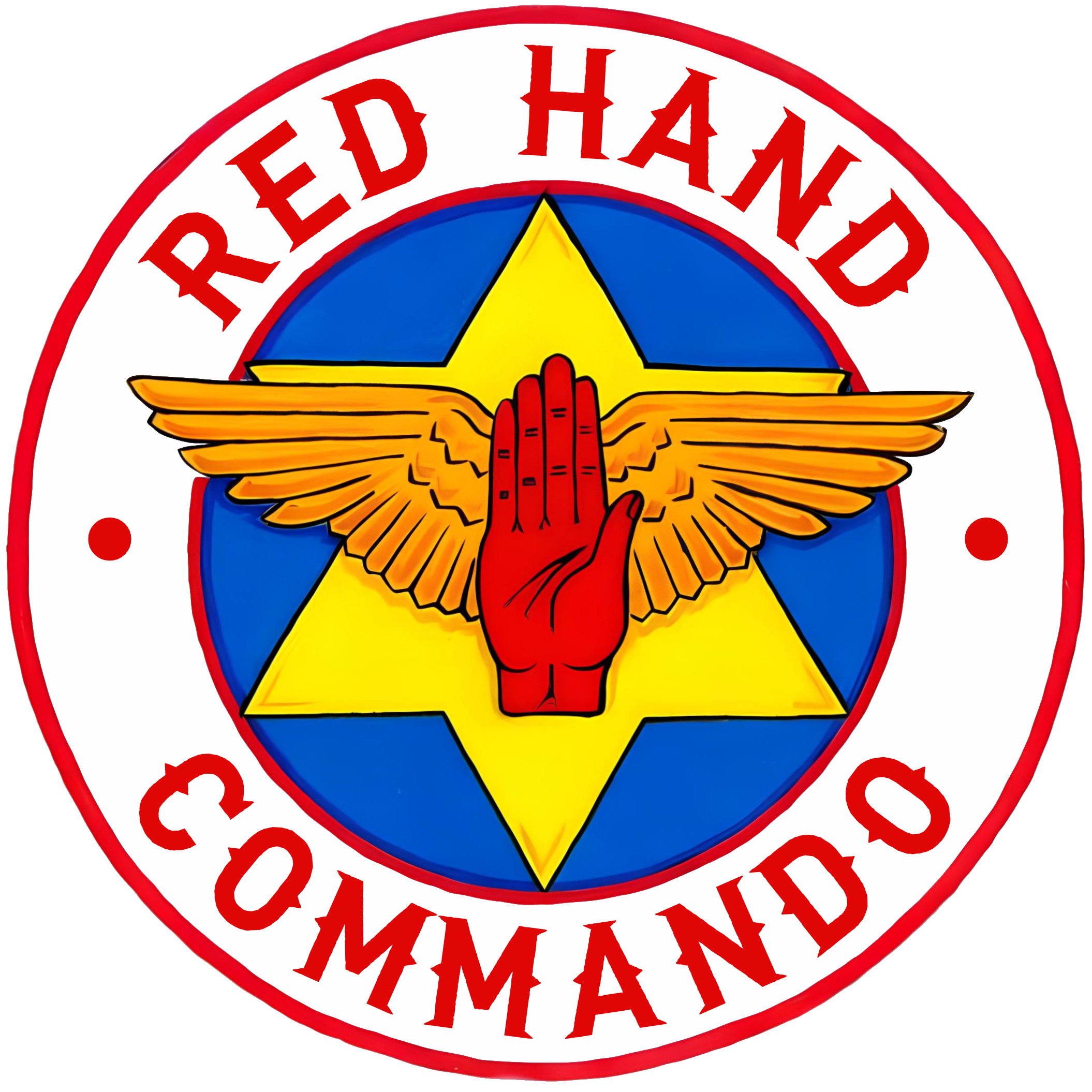
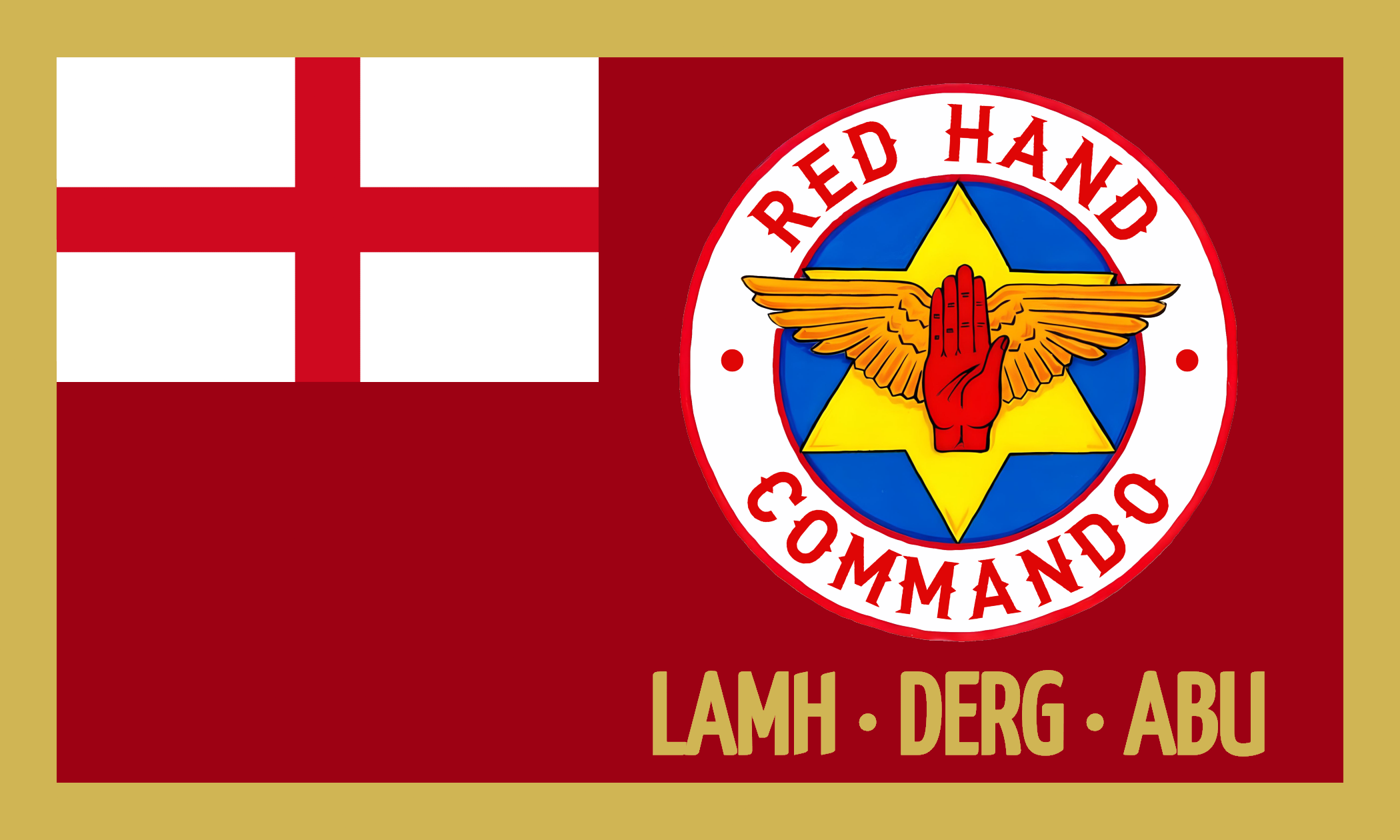
- Leaders: Ronnie "Flint" McCullough, John McKeague, Winston Churchill Rea, William "Plum" Smith, "Brigade Staff"
- Dates active: 1970 – 2007/2009 (declared ceasefire in October 1994, ended armed campaign in May 2007, disarmed by 2009)
- Groups: Red Hand Youth (youth wing); Progressive Unionist Party (political representation)
- Headquarters: Belfast
- Active regions: Northern Ireland
- Ideology: British unionism Ulster loyalism Anti-Catholicism; Anti-Irish sentiment
- Size: Small
- Wars: the Troubles

The Red Hand Commando (RHC) is a small secretive Ulster loyalist paramilitary group in Northern Ireland that is closely linked to the Ulster Volunteer Force (UVF). Its aim was to combat Irish republicanism – particularly the Irish Republican Army (IRA) – and to maintain Northern Ireland's status as part of the United Kingdom. The Red Hand Commando carried out shootings and bombings, primarily targeting Catholic civilians. As well as allowing other loyalist groupings to claim attacks in their name, the organisation has also allegedly used the cover names "Red Branch Knights" and "Loyalist Retaliation and Defence Group". It is named after the Red Hand of Ulster, and is unique among loyalist paramilitaries for its use of an Irish language motto, Lámh Dearg Abú, meaning 'red hand to victory'.

Writing in early 1973, Martin Dillon characterized the Red Hand Commando thus: "the composition of this group was highly selective, and it was very secret in its operations. Its membership was composed in the main of Protestant youths – the Tartans who roamed the streets at night looking for trouble. These youths longed for action, and McKeague let them have it."

The Red Hand Commando was the only major loyalist paramilitary group in Northern Ireland not to have its ranks heavily penetrated by a so-called supergrass or informant during the early 1980s; this was attributed to the group's secrecy (described as an "enigma") and opaque structure.

The RHC is a Proscribed Organisation in the United Kingdom under the Terrorism Act 2000. The Red Hand Commando made a failed application in September 2017 to be removed from the list of proscribed organisations in the UK.

== History ==
=== Formation ===
Much of the group's past is unknown. The RHC was formed in June 1970 among loyalists in the Shankill area of west Belfast, by Ronnie "Flint" McCullough, William "Plum" Smith and colleagues from the Shankill Defence Association. Membership was high in the Shankill, east Belfast, Sandy Row and Newtownabbey areas as well as in parts of County Down. A cell was also allegedly based in County Tyrone, near Castlederg. The RHC also reportedly had a presence in the Fermanagh and South Tyrone region in the 1970s, involved in bombings and issuing threats to nationalists. The RHC agreed in 1972 to become an integral part of the Ulster Volunteer Force (UVF). It kept its own structures but in operational matters agreed to share weapons and personnel and often carried out attacks in the name of the UVF. It was proscribed by William Whitelaw, Secretary of State for Northern Ireland, on 12 November 1973. According to Jim Wilson, chairman of the Reach Programme with association of the Red Hand Commando, the RHC numbered well over one thousand members during its campaign, and as of 2017 membership numbers were in the small hundreds who are engaged in community work.

=== Progressive Unionist Party formation ===
A number of senior Red Hand Commando members played an integral part in the formation of the Progressive Unionist Party in 1979. The beginnings of the party were in the compounds of Long Kesh, where members such as William Smith and Winston Churchill Rea joined members of the UVF in taking a new political direction.

=== Paramilitary campaign ===
Following the group's formation in 1970, RHC attacks usually took the form of random drive-by shootings targeting assumed Catholic civilians and no-warning bombs left at social spots (e.g. pubs) the group believed to be frequented by Catholics. The RHC also claimed responsibility for a number of killings in the Republic of Ireland in 1975 and 1976. During the 1980s Loyalist paramilitary violence had dropped significantly from its height in the mid-1970s, and the RHC wasn't implicated in any killings for several years. The organisation was reportedly considered "extinct" by 1988, although it was also described as "largely intact" and capable of violence in 1984. However Loyalist paramilitary activity generally began to increase following the signing of the Anglo-Irish Agreement and in 1988 the RHC was tied to at least two attempted murders. The group routinely used cover names during the first years of this resurgence in activity but later opted to claim attacks under the RHC title. RHC violence intensified in the years leading up to the 1994 Loyalist ceasefire, although never claiming as many victims as it did in the 1970s.

According to the Sutton database of deaths at the University of Ulster's CAIN project, the RHC has allegedly killed 13 people, including 12 civilians, and one of its own members. However, as a satellite grouping of the UVF, attacks carried out by the RHC have been in some cases attributed to the UVF; per other sources the RHC has killed at least 40 people.

The following is a timeline of RHC attacks, and attacks in which RHC members were killed:

==== 1970s ====
- 12 November 1971: The RHC carried out a bomb attack on the Frederick Inn pub on Frederick Street, Belfast. The thrown device missed the building and exploded on waste ground nearby, slightly injuring a girl.
- 8 February 1972: The RHC claimed responsibility for killing Bernard Rice, a member of the Catholic Ex-Servicemen's Association, in a drive-by shooting on Crumlin Road, Belfast.
- 13 March 1972: The RHC shot dead a Catholic civilian (Patrick McCrory) at his home on Ravenhill Avenue, Belfast.
- 15 April 1972: The RHC shot dead a Catholic civilian (Sean McConville, 17) from a passing car while he was walking along the Crumlin Road, Belfast.
- 20 July 1972: The RHC attempted to kill a Catholic businessman in the Smithfield area of Belfast.
- 28 July 1972: The RHC attempted to kill a Catholic civilian from a passing car on Upper Library Street, Belfast. William "Plum" Smith, later a senior figure in the Progressive Unionist Party, was arrested for his involvement in the attack, along with two other men.
- 26 September 1972: The RHC left a bomb at a home on Oakwood Avenue, Bangor, County Down, but the device failed to detonate.
- 31 October 1972: The RHC shot dead a Catholic civilian (James Kerr) at his workplace on Lisburn Road, Belfast. The gunman responsible was shot by a plainclothes policeman as he fled the scene and was arrested.
- 11 November 1972: The RHC shot dead a Catholic civilian (Gerard Kelly) at his shop on Crumlin Road, Belfast.
- 18 February 1973: The RHC shot dead two Catholic civilians, both postmen, (Anthony Coleman and Joseph McAleese) from a passing car while they were walking along Divis Street, Belfast. A gunman armed with a submachine gun had gotten out of the vehicle and opened fire.
- 26 March 1973: The RHC bombed the Catholic-owned Hillfoot Bar in east Belfast.
- 11 May 1973: The RHC shot and seriously injured a Catholic civilian (John McCormac) while he was walking along Raglan Street, Lower Falls, Belfast. He died three days later.
- 31 May 1973: The RHC shot dead an English sailor (Thomas Curry) during a gun and bomb attack on Muldoon's Bar, Corporation Square, Belfast.
- June 1973: The RHC attempted to kill four Catholic youths in a drive-by shooting on the Antrim Road, Belfast.
- 1 October 1973: The RHC shot a Catholic civilian (Eileen Doherty, 19) after hijacking the taxi she was travelling in at Annandale Embankment, Ballynafeigh, Belfast.
- 20 February 1974: RHC members beat and stabbed a "fellow Loyalist" (John Thompson) to death, he was found dead on the Ormeau Road, Belfast. Apparent internal dispute.
- July 1974: In what was described as a "no warning bomb spree", the RHC bombed 14 Catholic-owned pubs in 14 days. One man was killed (Thomas Braniff) and 100 people were wounded.
- 25 September 1974: The RHC shot dead a Catholic civilian (Kieran McIlroy) after he left work in Parkend Street off Limestone Road, Belfast.
- 9 March 1975: The RHC claimed responsibility for a firebomb attack on the fishing fleet moored at Greencastle, County Donegal, with 30 incendiary devices planted on 17 vessels. Fishermen described allegations their boats were being used for gun running as "laughable", noting that the Royal Navy frequently searched them at sea.
- 16 March 1975: The RHC was suspected by police to be responsible for a bomb that killed an RUC constable (Mildred Harrison) after exploding outside a Catholic-owned pub in Bangor, County Down.
- 12 April 1975: The RHC claimed responsibility for a gun and bomb attack on Strand Bar, Anderson Street, Belfast. Six Catholic civilians were killed. (See: Strand Bar bombing)
- 19 December 1975: A car bomb exploded without warning at Kay's Tavern in Dundalk, County Louth, Republic of Ireland. Two civilians were killed and twenty wounded. A short time later, there was a gun and bomb attack on the Silverbridge Inn near Crossmaglen, County Armagh. Two Catholic civilians and an English civilian were killed in that attack, while six others were wounded. Members of the "Glenanne gang" were believed to have been involved in these attacks. The RHC claimed responsibility for both.(See: Donnelly's Bar and Kay's Tavern attacks)
- 2 May 1976: The RHC shot dead a Catholic civilian (Seamus Ludlow) near his home in Thistlecross, County Louth.
- 2 June 1976: The RHC shot dead a Protestant civilian (David Spratt) at a house in Comber, County Down. A Catholic man was the intended target.
- 28 October 1976: The RHC and "Ulster Freedom Fighters" claimed responsibility for killing former Sinn Féin vice-president Máire Drumm. She was shot dead by gunmen dressed as doctors in Mater Hospital, Belfast. She had retired a short time before her killing and had been in the hospital for an operation. A UVF member (formerly a soldier), who worked as a security officer at the hospital, was among a number of men jailed.
- 8 March 1978: The RHC shot dead an Irish National Liberation Army (INLA) volunteer (Thomas Trainor) in Portadown, County Armagh.

==== 1980s ====
- 27 May 1980: Two RHC members carried out a gun attack on the home of a prison officer in Belfast.
- August 1981: According to Michael Stone, the RHC planned a bomb attack aimed at Charles Haughey's yacht, the Taurima II, while it was berthed at Dingle Harbour, County Kerry. Stone claimed the RHC operative planned to "wire Haughey's boat with five pounds of commercial explosives. … [he] would attach the bomb to the on-board radio using an electrical detonator. Once the radio was switched on, the bomb would explode". The operation was aborted after two RHC operatives were arrested a week earlier for a robbery and the explosives became volatile in transit from a quarry in Scotland. Elements of MI5 allegedly provided a dossier on Haughey to the RHC.
- 29 January 1982: RHC founder John McKeague was shot dead at his shop on Albertbridge Road, Belfast. by the Irish National Liberation Army (INLA).
- 14 July 1986: The RHC claimed responsibility for a no-warning car bomb in Castlewellan, County Down that injured two people; the attack was revenge for a ban on an Orange Order parade through the predominantly-Catholic town. The UFF also claimed responsibility.
- 6 January 1988: The RHC (thought to have been "extinct" for some years at this time) claimed responsibility for a blast-bomb thrown into the home of a Catholic man in the Short Strand area of east Belfast.
- 2 October 1988: The RHC fired twenty shots at the home of a former INLA member in the Ormeau Road area of Belfast.
- 23 July 1989: The RHC shot dead a Catholic civilian (John Devine) at his home in the Divis area of Belfast. The attack wasn't attributed to a specific Loyalist group at the time, but in 2016 former RHC leader Winkie Rea was charged with the murder.

==== 1990s and 2000s ====
===== 1990s =====
- 11 March 1990: RHC members assaulted a full-time UDR soldier (Samuel McChesney) with a hatchet at his home in Dundonald on the outskirts of Belfast. He died of his injuries the following day.
- 17 April 1991: The RHC shot dead a Catholic taxi driver (John O'Hara) on Dunluce Avenue, off the Lisburn Road, Belfast. The attack was claimed by the Ulster Freedom Fighters, but in 2016 former RHC leader Winkie Rea was charged with the murder.
- 10 August 1991: The "Loyalist Retaliation and Defence Group" (believed to be linked to the RHC) shot dead a Catholic civilian (James Carson) at his shop on Donegall Road, Belfast. It was targeted for selling republican newsletter An Phoblacht.
- 28 September 1991: The Loyalist Retaliation and Defence Group shot dead a Catholic civilian (Larry Murchan) at his shop on St James Road, Belfast. It was targeted for selling An Phoblacht.
- 28 September 1992: The "Red Branch Knights" (believed to be linked to the RHC) claimed responsibility for six incendiary devices left in a shopping centre in Newtownabbey. Three bombs were defused. Earlier, a blast bomb left outside a Dublin-based bank nearby was also defused. Statements were sent to the media threatening action against anyone with political or economic links with the Republic of Ireland, and several companies and individuals received death threats accompanied by bullets through the post.
- 9 October 1992: The RHC shot dead a Protestant civilian (Michael Anderson) at his workplace on Mersey Street, Belfast. It claimed he was an informer.
- 6 November 1992: The RHC claimed responsibility for shooting and wounding a security guard at the Mater Hospital in North Belfast. The UFF also claimed responsibility.
- 1 January 1993: The RHC claimed responsibility for shooting two Catholic civilians on Manor Street, Belfast. The two men were cleaning a car when they were shot at from a passing vehicle. The RHC claimed it was retaliation for the killing of a British soldier in the area two days before.
- 11 January 1993: The RHC claimed responsibility for an arson attack on a fast food store in Belfast.
- 17 February 1993: The RHC claimed responsibility for shooting into the home of a Catholic man in Newtownabbey. There were no injuries.
- 5 April 1993: The RHC was alleged to be responsible for shooting dead a former UDA member (William Killen) at his flat in Portavogie, County Down. Security sources suggested it was a punishment shooting gone wrong.
- 7 May 1993: The RHC carried out an arson attack on a GAA club at Ballycran, County Down.
- 30 May 1993: The RHC shot dead a Catholic civilian (Edward McHugh) at his home in Dundonald, County Down.
- 29 July 1993: The RHC shot and seriously injured a Catholic man and a teenage boy after their car broke down on the M2 Motorway outside Belfast.
- 8 August 1993: The RHC carried out an arson attack on a GAA club at Portaferry, County Down. On 23 August the RHC threatened to attack workmen repairing the premises.
- 25 August 1993: The RHC announced that it would attack bars or hotels where Irish folk music is played, following a claim of responsibility for an attempted bombing on a pub in Newtownards, County Down. Following widespread criticism the RHC withdrew the threat a day later.
- 1 September 1993: The RHC claimed responsibility for shooting two Catholic civilians in Shore Crescent, Belfast.
- 13 September 1993: The RHC shot dead a former RHC leader (Vernon Bailie) outside his girlfriend's home in Carrowdore, County Down. Internal dispute.
- 17 February 1994: The RHC shot dead a Catholic civilian (Sean McParland) in his relatives' home on Skegoneill Avenue, Belfast.
- 7 April 1994: A Protestant woman (Margaret Wright) was found dead at the back of an abandoned house on Donegall Avenue, Belfast. She had been beaten and then shot by a group of UVF/RHC members, who assumed she was a Catholic.
- 23 August 1994: The RHC shot and seriously injured a Protestant workman, mistaken for a Catholic, in Rathcoole in Newtownabbey, County Antrim.
- 28 September 1995: The RHC shot dead one of its own members Billy Elliot in Bangor, County Down for the killing of a Protestant Woman in April 1994.
- 30 March 1997: The RHC was linked to a 90 lb (41 kg) bomb left in a hijacked taxi outside a Sinn Féin office in the New Lodge area of Belfast. After security forces evacuated nearby families from the area, British Army engineers successfully neutralised the bomb via a controlled detonation.
- 17 March 1999: The UVF shot dead an expelled member of the RHC (Frankie Curry) as he walked over waste ground off Malvern Way, Belfast, in an internal dispute.

===== 2000s =====
- 13 September 2002: The RHC shot dead a member of the Loyalist Volunteer Force (LVF) as he sat in a car in Newtownards, County Down. The killing was part of a loyalist feud.
- 8 May 2003: A member of the RHC was shot dead in at his home in Crawfordsburn, County Down. The killing was believed to be part of a loyalist feud.

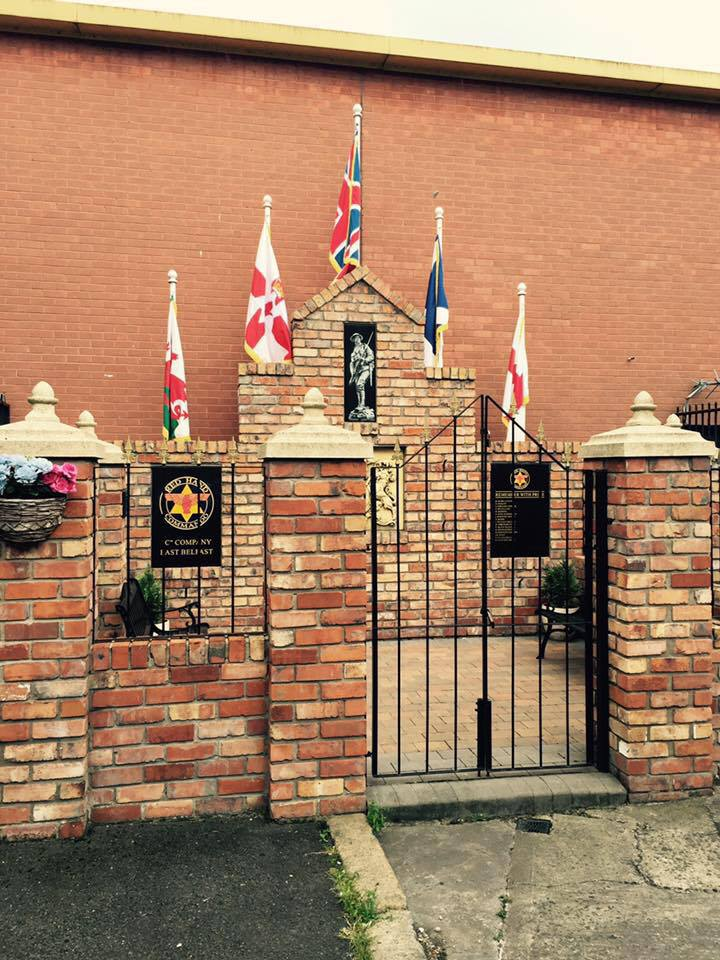
RHC Memorial Garden

=== Ceasefire and decommissioning ===
In October 1994, the Combined Loyalist Military Command (CLMC) declared a ceasefire on behalf of all loyalist paramilitary groups. The RHC, along with all major Loyalist groups, supported the signing of the 1998 Good Friday Agreement and maintained a ceasefire from 1994 until (arguably) 2005. On 3 May 2007, the RHC declared it was officially ending its armed campaign, following recent negotiations between the Progressive Unionist Party (PUP) and Irish Taoiseach Bertie Ahern and with Police Service of Northern Ireland (PSNI) Chief Constable Sir Hugh Orde. The RHC made a statement that it would transform to a "non-military, civilianised" organisation. This was to take effect from midnight. It also stated that it would retain its weaponry but put them beyond reach of normal volunteers. Its weapon stockpiles were to be retained under the watch of the RHC leadership.

=== 2007 official statement ===
Following a direct engagement with all the units and departments of our organisation, the leadership of the Ulster Volunteer Force and Red Hand Commando today make public the outcome of our three year consultation process.

We do so against a backdrop of increasing community acceptance that the mainstream republican offensive has ended; that the six principles upon which our ceasefire was predicated are maintained; that the principle of consent has been firmly established and thus, that the union remains safe.

We welcome recent developments in securing stable, durable democratic structures in Northern Ireland and accept as significant, support by the mainstream republican movement of the constitutional status quo.

Commensurate with these developments, as of 12 midnight, Thursday 3 May 2007, the Ulster Volunteer Force and Red Hand Commando will assume a non-military, civilianised, role.

To consolidate this fundamental change in outlook we have addressed the methodology of transformation from military to civilian organisation by implementing the following measures in every operational and command area.

==== Recruitment ====
All recruitment has ceased; military training has ceased; targeting has ceased and all intelligence rendered obsolete; all active service units have been de-activated; all ordinance has been put beyond reach and the IICD instructed accordingly.

We encourage our volunteers to embrace the challenges which continue to face their communities and support their continued participation in non-military capacities.

We reaffirm our opposition to all criminality and instruct our volunteers to cooperate fully with the lawful authorities in all possible instances.

Moreover, we state unequivocally, that any volunteer engaged in criminality does so in direct contravention of brigade command and thus we welcome any recourse through due process of law.

All volunteers are further encouraged to show support for credible restorative justice projects so that they, with their respective communities, may help to eradicate criminality and anti-social behaviour in our society.

We call on all violent dissidents to desist immediately.

We ask the government to facilitate this process and remove the obstacles which currently prevent our volunteers and their families from assuming full and meaningful citizenship.

We call on all violent dissidents to desist immediately and urge all relevant governments and their security apparatus to deal swiftly and efficiently with this threat.

Failure to do so will inevitably provoke another generation of loyalists toward armed resistance.

We have taken the above measures in an earnest attempt to augment the return of accountable democracy to the people of Northern Ireland and as such, to engender confidence that the constitutional question has now been firmly settled.

In doing so we reaffirm the legitimacy of our tactical response to violent nationalism yet reiterate the sincere expression of abject and true remorse to all innocent victims of the conflict.

Brigade command salutes the dedication and fortitude of officers, NCOs, and volunteers throughout the difficult, brutal years of armed resistance.

We reflect with honour on those from our organisation who made the ultimate sacrifice; those who endured long years of incarceration and the loyal families who shared their suffering and supported them throughout.

Finally, we convey our appreciation for their honest forthright exchange with officers, NCOs and volunteers throughout the organisation over the past three years which has allowed us to assume with confidence the position we adopt today.

For God and Ulster. Captain William Johnston, Adjutant.

The Independent International Commission on Decommissioning (IICD) stated that this statement was "unacceptable." In June 2009, after talks with the IICD, it was announced that the RHC and UVF had decommissioned their weapons before independent witnesses.

The group is noted for using an Irish language motto, Lámh Dearg Abú (Victory to the Red Hand) as opposed to a Latin motto like most other Loyalist groups.
