= William Smith (loyalist) =

Northern Irish loyalist, paramilitary and politician

- Smith at Fernhill House, October 1994
- Born: 26 January 1954; Belfast, Northern Ireland
- Died: 8 June 2016 (aged 62)
- Other name: Plum
- Citizenship: British
- Occupations: Prison orderly shipyard worker
- Years active: 1971–2016
- Employer(s): Crumlin Road Gaol; Harland and Wolff
- Known for: Ulster loyalism
- Notable work: Inside Man, Loyalists of Long Kesh – The Untold Story (2014)
- Political party: Progressive Unionist Party
- Movement: Ulster Volunteer Force; Red Hand Commando
- Criminal charge: Attempted murder
- Criminal penalty: Ten years imprisonment
- Criminal status: Released after five years
- Parent(s): Charles William and Isobel Smith
- Relatives: Margaret, Elizabeth, Nan, Gordon and Jean (siblings)

William Smith (sometimes erroneously spelt Smyth) (26 January 1954 – 8 June 2016) was a Northern Irish loyalist, paramilitary, and politician. He had been involved in Ulster loyalism in various capacities for at least forty years.

== Early life ==
Smith was born in Mountjoy Street on Belfast's Shankill Road into a poor Ulster Protestant family, the son of shipyard worker Charles William Smith and his wife Isobel. He had three older sisters, Margaret, Elizabeth and Nan (the latter dying in infancy before he was born), a younger brother Gordon and a younger sister Jean. There was rumoured Native American ancestry in his family; therefore in his youth he acquired the lifelong nickname "Plum" after The Beano character Little Plum. He was raised in a working class home where his parents sent him to Sunday school and taught him to respect the law. Like many of his contemporaries from similar backgrounds on both sides of the divide, the outbreak of the socio-political/religious conflict that came to be known as the Troubles in 1969 saw him become involved in paramilitarism.

== Move to paramilitarism ==
Following the introduction of internment in 1971, Smith worked for a time as an orderly in Crumlin Road Gaol where he served six months for rioting against the British Army in the Highfield estate. Unbeknownst to the prison authorities, Smith was working as a mole for the imprisoned Ulster Volunteer Force (UVF) leader Gusty Spence, passing on information about the conditions in which the internees were being held.

Around this time Smith was a member of the vigilante group and was part of a group within the SDA that later became the Red Hand Commando, including founder John McKeague, who decided to form a new, more active organisation. In 1972, Smith was a founder-member of this new group, which quickly became an elite squad augmenting the UVF.

On 1 July Smith was one of two armed RHC men to meet Spence when he was released from prison to attend the wedding of his daughter to Winkie Rea. He took Spence to a meeting of the UVF leadership where a plan was hatched to keep Spence out of prison. A few days later when Spence was being returned to jail by his nephew Frankie Curry, their car was stopped on Belfast's Springmartin Road and Spence "kidnapped" by UVF/RHC operatives.

Soon after this incident Smith was himself arrested for his part in the attempted murder of Catholic civilian Joseph Hall, a drive-by shooting that Smith would later admit was motivated by "pure sectarianism and bigotry". Smith was handed a ten-year prison sentence for the shooting. Tried along with Ronnie McCullough and Tom Reid, Smith pleaded not guilty although he subsequently admitted that he did so to satisfy the UVF's policy of members never pleading guilty and would state that "we were caught red-handed".

== In the Maze ==
Along with the likes of Billy Hutchinson, David Ervine and Billy Mitchell, Smith was one of those on the UVF wings of the Maze prison in the 1970s to be won over by Gusty Spence to his newer, more politicised, way of thinking. This cadre of Spence-trained political figures would go on to play a leading role in bringing about the UVF ceasefire in 1994 as members of the Progressive Unionist Party (PUP). He learnt Irish during his time in prison, and was happy to refer to the language as 'his own'. Smith was released on 28 July 1977 after serving five years of a ten-year sentence.

== Political activity ==
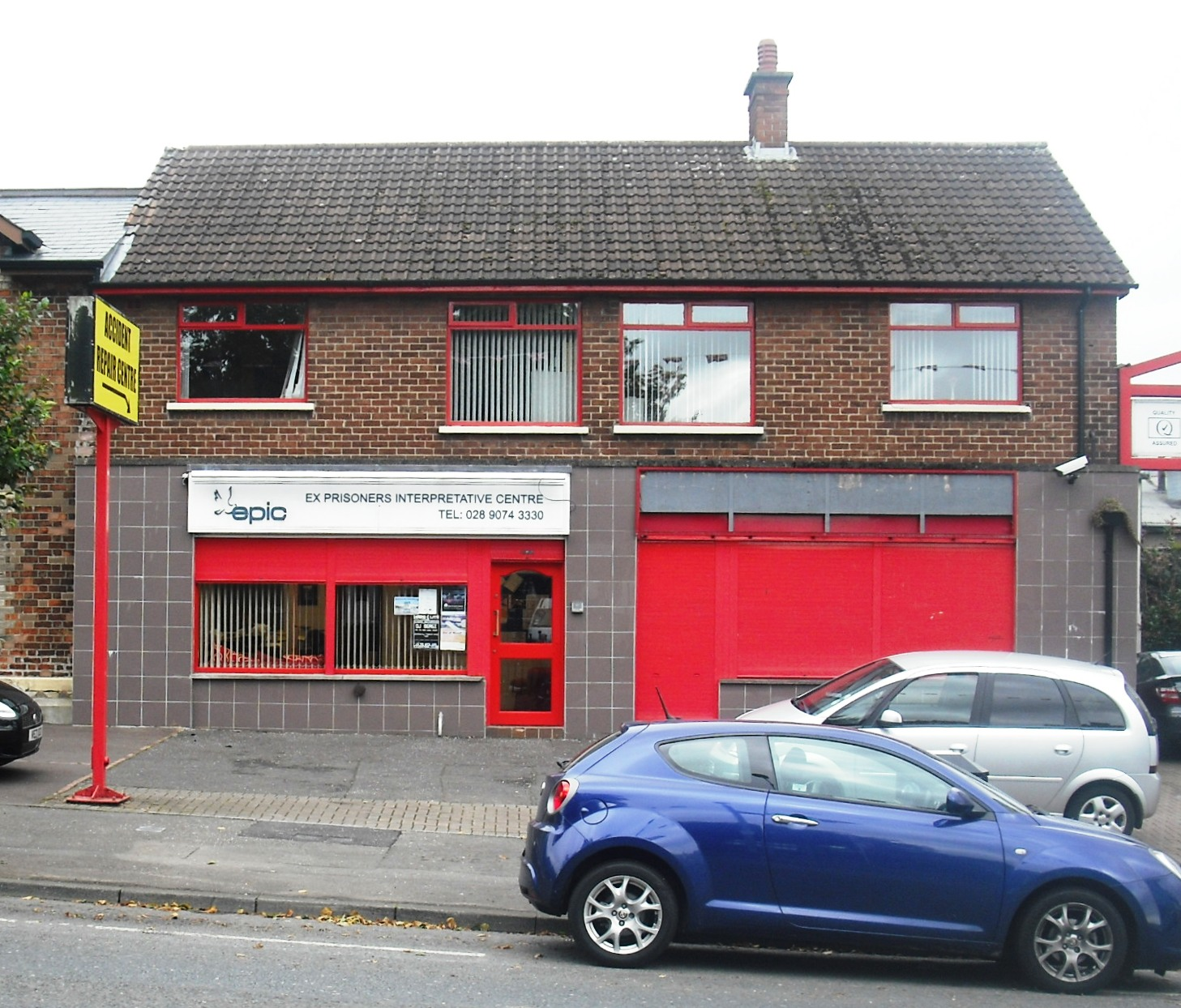
Ex-Prisoners Interpretative Centre, Woodvale Road, where Smith was based

Smith secured a job in the Harland & Wolff shipyard in 1978 and became involved in trade union activity, initially as a shop steward before ultimately ending up a member of the general executive of the Transport & General Workers Union. He was dismissed from the shipyard in 1988 following a period of restructuring that involved a sell-off of part of the business, although Smith contended that his trade union activity had hastened his removal by making him unpopular with the management.

At this point the unemployed Smith became involved with a number of community schemes on the Shankill Road that were organised by Gusty Spence, initially in a voluntary capacity. The two became close and when Spence undertook a reorganisation of the PUP in 1990, Smith was given the role of chairman and Prisons Spokesman, along with Hugh Smyth as leader, David Ervine as Political Spokesman and Spence and Jim McDonald as members of the party executive.

Through Spence, Smith established contacts with Joe Colgan, a Dublin-based Irish republican, and in March 1993 the two arranged an event in the city at which both a member of the UVF and the trade unionist Chris Hudson were in attendance. As a result of the meeting Hudson opened a regular channel of contact with the UVF through which he exhorted them to seek peace.

The Combined Loyalist Military Command (CLMC) ceasefire was announced on 13 October 1994 at Fernhill House, Glencairn when Gusty Spence read out a joint statement of ceasefire flanked by Smith and Jim McDonald of the PUP and Ulster Democratic Party representatives Gary McMichael, Davy Adams and John White. Smith was the chairman of the press conference at which Spence read out the statement. For a time he had served as Chairman of the Progressive Unionist Party itself.

Smith would go on to devote his attentions to community work with the Ex-Prisoners Interpretative Centre although he has remained a spokesman for the PUP. He was also an unsuccessful candidate for the PUP in the Belfast City Council elections in 2001 in the Court district electoral area.

Speaking out in 2012 about Unionist concerns at the Maze prison becoming an IRA shrine with a proposed Conflict Transformation Centre, Smith stated that if Loyalists themselves got involved in the scheme they could tell their side of the story and no one particular group could use it as a shrine.

== Opposition to trials ==
In 2009 Smith was strongly critical of the report issued by the Consultative Group on the Past, as chaired by Robin Eames and Denis Bradley. He criticised the work of the Historical Enquiries Team, which investigated unsolved incidents from the Troubles, arguing that it was opening "a can of worms" and preventing "closure". He compared any attempts to reopen investigations and bring about criminal proceedings to the Nuremberg trials.

In 2010 Smith attacked the work of Victims Commissioner Brendan McAllister, who was investigating the activities of the UVF unit based on the Mount Vernon estate, north Belfast, during the Troubles. Smith argued that such investigations contravened a guarantee he had been given by Mo Mowlam that offences committed before 1998 could not be prosecuted due to a general amnesty. Soon afterwards Smith claimed that a document released by the British and Irish governments proved that the deal was in place as he claimed. In support of his stance Smith even gave evidence at the trial of Gerry McGeough, arguing that the republican should not have been tried for the 1981 attempted murder of Sammy Brush because of the supposed deal being in place.

== Book ==
Smith launched his book Inside Man, Loyalists of Long Kesh – The Untold Story (ISBN 978-1780730646) on 13 October 2014, the twentieth anniversary of the CLMC ceasefire. The book argues that thanks to politicisation and education a group of prominent loyalists prisoners came to support negotiation with their republican counterparts, leading to the eventual Northern Ireland peace process. The book mainly dealt with the experiences of loyalist prisoners within the Maze and was not intended as an autobiography.

== Death ==
Smith died on 8 June 2016, aged 62 after a short illness. Former PUP leader Brian Ervine paid tribute to his negotiating skills by bringing the RHC & UVF to the peace process, his intelligence, left thinking politics and for his cross community work. Sinn Féin Deputy First Minister Martin McGuinness praised his contribution and commitment to the peace process.

His funeral was held in St. Matthew's Church of Ireland on the Woodvale Road. Community worker and former loyalist prisoner Jim Wilson described Smith's contribution to loyalism as 'massive' during The Troubles but later became an 'architect of peace'. Wilson also commented that Sinn Féin representative's presence at the funeral proved Smith's sincerity at extending the hand of friendship across the sectarian divide.
