= Flagstaff Hill incident =

1976 cross-border incident between Ireland and the United Kingdom

- Part of the Troubles and Operation Banner
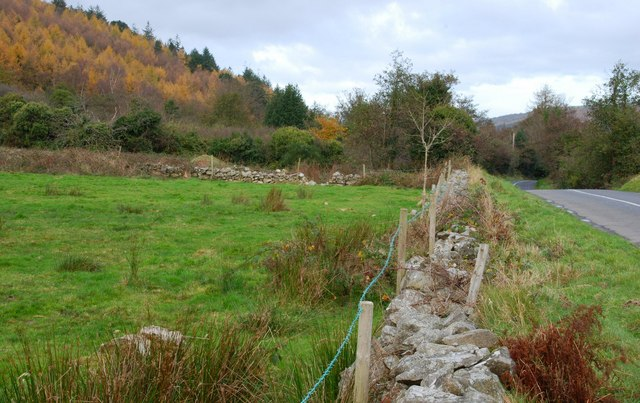
- Flagstaff road along Cornamucklagh, where the SAS team was stopped by the Gardaí and the Irish Army
Date	5–6 May 1976
Location	Cornamucklagh, County Louth; Republic of Ireland 54°6′15.02″N 6°17′29.93″W
Result	SAS operation thwarted

Belligerents
Ireland: Irish Army; Garda Siochána	United Kingdom: Special Air Service

Commanders and leaders
Pat McLoughlin	Malcolm Rees

Strength
1 Garda unit 1 Irish Army unit	2 SAS teams

Casualties and losses
None	8 soldiers arrested
- Location within Ireland

The Flagstaff Hill incident was an international incident between the Republic of Ireland and the United Kingdom. It took place on the night of 5/6 May 1976 near Cornamucklagh, a townland just inside the Cooley Peninsula in the north of County Louth in the Republic of Ireland, when the Irish Army and Garda Síochána arrested eight British Special Air Service soldiers who had illegally crossed the Irish border.

== Background ==
The worsening security situation in south County Armagh, especially after the killing of three British soldiers at an observation post in November 1975 and the massacre of ten Protestant workers in January 1976, prompted British PM Harold Wilson to publicly acknowledge the presence of D squadron of the Special Air Service (SAS), which was deployed to Bessbrook Mill. The ambush of the observation post exposed the fact that conventional military tactics hadn't worked for the British Government in South Armagh, since the British Army report of this incident identified a number of basic mistakes regarding camouflage, routine patterns and the observation post's arrangement.

On 28 October 1971, a confrontation had taken place between British and Irish troops at a cross-border bridge between the Republic and Northern Ireland, at the village of Munnelly, between counties Fermanagh and Monaghan. A British patrol was laying explosive charges to destroy the bridge, as part of an effort to destroy bridges and roads being used by the Provisional IRA to import arms and supplies from the Republic of Ireland into Northern Ireland. A Garda Síochána officer stated that the bridge was at least half in the Republic, and the British Army officer on the scene disputed this. The Irish Army then deployed a unit of soldiers and its commander, armed with a submachine gun, demanded that the British Army surrender their explosives. Following a 90-minute standoff, the British Army withdrew.

The first high-profile action carried out by the SAS in 1976 was in March when it abducted Sean McKenna, an IRA member wanted for attempted murder and a string of other offences. McKenna was abducted at 2:30 am while sleeping at home in Edentober, on the Republic's side of the border, in a cross-border raid by the SAS. Once across the border, he was officially arrested by another detachment of the British Army.

In April, the SAS killed IRA member Peter Cleary in controversial circumstances near Forkhill, just 50 metres inside Northern Ireland. Although the porous nature of the border had led to 189 inadvertent border crossings by the British security forces in the previous two years, these latest incursions heightened the sensitivity to the issue by the Garda Síochána. Another concern for the Irish Government was the activity of loyalist paramilitary elements in the area, especially that of the so-called Glenanne gang one of which had kidnapped and killed a civilian named Seamus Ludlow near Dundalk four days earlier.

== The incident ==
After the kidnapping and murder of Seamus Ludlow near Dundalk, the Republic's security forces stepped up their presence along the border. A checkpoint was set up by the Gardaí and the Irish Army on Flagstaff Road in the townland of Cornamucklagh, some 700 metres inside County Louth in the Republic. At 10:40 pm, the Gardaí stopped a Triumph 2000 car coming from the north with two men inside. The driver obeyed the signal to stop, but when questioned by the policemen about their destination, they avoided a straight answer. They were asked to step out of the vehicle after one Garda noticed that the passenger had what seemed to be a gun hidden under a map. The unidentified men were unwilling to leave the car until Irish Army soldiers came out of the bushes and pointed rifles at them in support of the Gardaí. The two men, who wore plain clothes, were Fijian-born trooper Ilisoni Ligari and trooper John Lawson, both soldiers in the SAS. After searching the car, the policemen found a Sterling submachine-gun and a Browning pistol. The Gardaí immediately arrested them, with the help of the Army, and took them to nearby Omeath Garda station. Lawson initially claimed that they were off-duty soldiers who became stranded while test-driving the car, and Ligari refused to talk about "the mission we were on". It later transpired that Lawson and Ligari were in the area to collect or relieve Staff Sergeant Malcolm Rees and Corporal Ronald Nicholson; two SAS soldiers who were carrying out surveillance from a hidden observation post on Flagstaff Hill, which is just inside South Armagh in Northern Ireland overlooking Carlingford Lough. According to author Peter Taylor, Rees and Nicholson were actually deployed on the Republic's side of the border.

When the soldiers manning the surveillance post failed to meet Ligari and Lawson, they radioed their base at Bessbrook Mill. Initially, an IRA ambush was suspected. Four plain-clothes SAS soldiers—troopers Nial McClean, Vincent Thompson, Nigel Burchell and Carsten Rhodes—were sent to search for their missing comrades in two cars, picking up the two men from the observation post in the process. The team was carrying another three Sterling submachine-guns, a Remington pump-action shotgun and 222 rounds of ammunition. The first vehicle — a Hillman Avenger carrying Thompson, McClean, Rees and Nicholson - drove up to the Garda checkpoint at 2:05 am. Rees and Nicholson were still wearing British Army uniforms. The second car—a Vauxhall Victor with Burchell and Rhodes—was stopped shortly after. Sergeant Rees tried to explain the situation to the Gardaí: "Let us go back. If the roles were reversed we would let you go back. We are all doing the one bloody job", but he eventually ordered his men to surrender their weapons after Irish Army soldiers surrounded both cars and aimed rifles at them. The Garda unit, commanded by Sergeant Pat McLoughlin, radioed his superiors for instructions on how to deal with the men now in custody. The shotgun drew the attention of the Gardaí since the same type of weapon was used in three recent murders in the area. The Omeath Garda station was ordered to keep the men in custody until a decision was taken at a Governmental level in Dublin. Before dawn, it was decided that the SAS team be transferred to Dundalk Garda station.

== Diplomatic consequences ==
The arrest and detention of eight British Army soldiers put Irish Taoiseach Liam Cosgrave and his coalition government in a dilemma: If he released them without charge he was giving a green light for further British military incursions into the Republic, but if he permitted them to be put on trial and they were convicted, diplomatic relations with Britain would be at risk. A report published by Mr Justice Henry Barron in 2006 revealed that the soldiers were questioned whilst in Garda custody about the three murders, especially that of Seamus Ludlow that had been recently committed in the area. They were also questioned about the 1974 Dublin and Monaghan bombings, and their weapons were checked in relation to forensic evidence from the murders in question. Both protesters and media camped outside Dundalk station. There were concerns that the station could be attacked by a mob or the IRA at any moment seeking to get at the prisoners. The detainees were subsequently moved under heavy armed escort to Dublin, where they were charged by the Special Criminal Court with possession of firearms with intent to endanger life, and for carrying firearms without a certificate. The charges carried a maximum sentence of twenty years in prison. The eight soldiers were released on bail after the British embassy paid £40,000 and a helicopter flew them out of the state. The British Army Minister, Bob Brown, apologised to the Irish Government, saying the incursion over the border had been a mistake. The British Government, embarrassed by the situation, gave top priority to the immediate release of the soldiers. Sir Arthur Galsworthy, then British ambassador to the Republic of Ireland, stressed his concern about the finding of a shotgun and a dagger among the weapons confiscated by the Gardaí, and the fact that most of the soldiers were in plain clothes, and that the two groups had given different accounts of their purposes of presence within the Republic of Ireland. When it became clear that a trial was unavoidable, the British Government hardened its position, with a member of the Foreign Office proposing economic sanctions against the Republic, and even mooting the creation of a "buffer zone" along the border, which would have created "a no-man's land in which the terrorist could do what they would". A confidential memo from the Northern Ireland Office also called for pressure on the Irish Government to discharge the soldiers on the grounds that the safety of the SAS men in an Irish prison could not be guaranteed.

== Aftermath ==
Although Director of Public Prosecutions Eamonn Barnes was pressured by the Irish Government to drop the charges, the eight SAS men stood trial in March 1977. They were each found guilty and fined £100 for possession of arms and ammunition without firearms licensing. The weapons were returned to the British Government after forensic analysis by the Garda established that they had not been used in any crime under investigation in the Republic of Ireland. A British military source later stated that the use of a 1:63,000 scale map instead of a 1:20,000 map had led the SAS men to be south of the border without knowing it. In 1976, there were another 54 incursions by British forces inside the Republic's boundaries. On 28 October 1986 there was another cross-border incident in which a British soldier was arrested by the Gardaí after an IRA mortar attack on Drummuckavall British Army watchtower in County Armagh. A red Ford Escort was pursued while escaping across the border towards Thomas Murphy's farm by soldiers of the Scots Guards. One of the soldiers, a Lance Corporal, broke into a shed, where he was confronted by two IRA members. The soldier had inadvertently crossed the border and after a brief brawl with the two men, a Garda patrol arrived at the scene and arrested the soldier. He was taken to the Gardaí station at Dundalk, but was released six hours later after liaison between senior RUC and Garda officers.
