= Chief of Staff of the Sultan's Armed Forces =

Head of the armed forces of Oman

- رئــاسة أركــان قــوات السلطــان المسلحــة (Arabic)
- Seal of the Sultan's Armed Forces

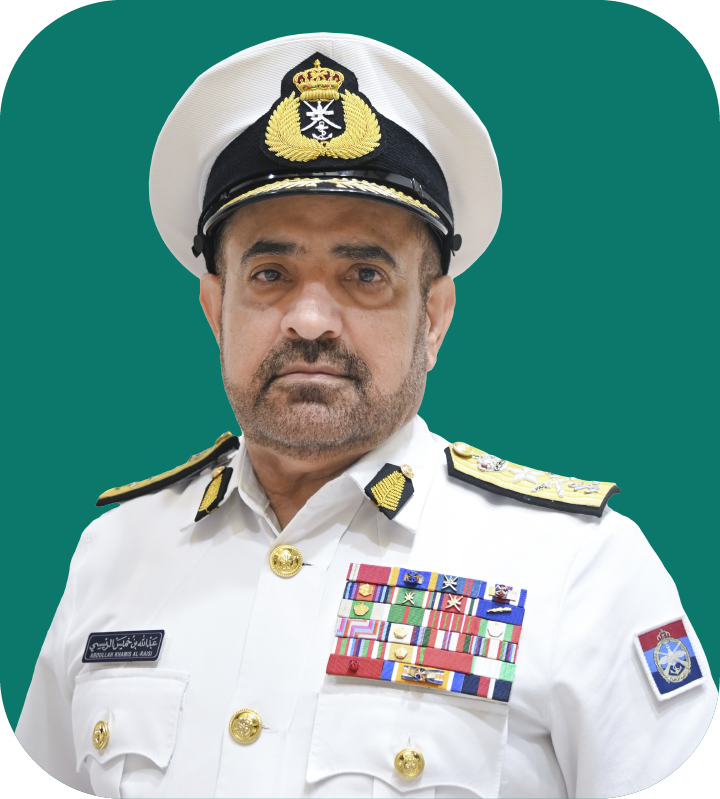
- Incumbent; Vice Admiral Abdullah bin Khamis bin Abdullah Al Raisi since 18 January 2021
- Sultan's Armed Forces
- Reports to: The Sultan of Oman
- Appointer: The Sultan of Oman
- Formation: 1979 (Chief of Defense Staff); 1987 (Chief of Staff)
- First holder: General Sir Timothy May Creasey
- Website: www.mod.gov.om

The Office of Chief of Staff of the Sultan’s Armed Forces (Arabic: رئــاسة أركــان قــوات السلطــان المسلحــة) is the authority responsible for the coordination of multiple aspects related to operations, training, qualifications, services, media and the dissemination of military culture throughout the Sultan's Armed Forces in Oman. A number of the joint military institutions in the Sultan’s Armed Forces fall within its purview.

== History ==
In 1955, the first central administrative command was formed of what was then known as the Muscat Armed Forces. The Muscat Infantry Commander was appointed as the Administrative Commander of all of the armed forces at the time. This was followed on 23 April 1958 by the appointment of a commander of the Sultan's Armed Forces. December 11, 1975 marked the occasion of the formal end of military operations in the Dhofar rebellion after the Sultan’s Armed Forces successfully achieved lasting peace, security and stability in the Dhofar Governorate. Shortly afterwards, planning was initiated to restructure the Defence Forces.

In 1976, the Sultan’s Armed Forces was reorganized into separate land, air and sea forces, with respective commanders for each service. The position of Commander of the Sultan’s Armed Forces was henceforth abolished which represented a major reappraisal of how the Defence Forces would be organized going forward. Subsequently, in 1979, the position of Chief of Defence Staff was created, although the first incumbent of this post, General Sir Timothy May Creasey, was not appointed until 5 August 1981. In 1987, the Ministry of Defence underwent further restructuring, resulting in the post of Chief of Defence Staff being replaced by Chief of Staff of the Sultan's Armed Forces.

== List of chiefs of staff ==
No.	Portrait	Name (Birth–Death)	Term of office			Ref.
No.	Portrait	Name (Birth–Death)	Took office	Left office	Time in office	Ref.
1		General; Sir Timothy May Creasey (1923–1986)	5 August 1981	December 1984	3 years, 3 months	
2		Lieutenant General; Sir John Peter Barry Condliffe Watts (1930–2003)	December 1984	March 1987	2 years, 3 months	
3		Lieutenant General; Hamid bin Said bin Mohammed Al Aufi	26 March 1987	12 December 1990	3 years, 261 days	
4		Lieutenant General; Khamis bin Hamad bin Salim Al Kalbani	12 December 1990	21 June 2003	12 years, 191 days	
5		Lieutenant General; Ahmed bin Harith bin Nasser Al Nabhani	8 July 2003	18 January 2021	17 years, 194 days	
6		Vice Admiral; Abdullah bin Khamis bin Abdullah Al Raisi	18 January 2021	Incumbent	5 years, 232 days	
