= Winston Churchill Rea =

Northern Irish loyalist (1950/1951–2023)

Winston Churchill Rea (1950/1951 – 1 December 2023), known as Winkie Rea, was a Northern Irish loyalist from Belfast. He was the leader of the Red Hand Commando (RHC), a paramilitary organisation that was active during the Troubles. Part of a leading loyalist family, Rea was involved in paramilitary activity from the early years of that conflict.

== Red Hand Commando ==
Rea was born in 1950 or 1951 in Belfast, Northern Ireland, and brought up as a Protestant on the loyalist Shankill Road. Although his full name was Winston Churchill Rea, he was better known by his nickname Winkie. Sometime after the outbreak of the Troubles, his parents emigrated to Australia to get away from the violence. In his youth he often attended the rallies of Ian Paisley. It is not known when he joined the Red Hand Commando, a loyalist paramilitary organisation founded in 1970 and was closely affiliated with the larger Ulster Volunteer Force (UVF). He eventually rose in its ranks to later become leader, succeeding John McKeague.

Rea met Elizabeth Spence, daughter of UVF leader Gusty Spence, who was imprisoned at the time. In April 1972, he travelled to Long Kesh Prison, where he obtained permission from Spence to marry her. Immediately after the wedding, Spence was kidnapped by two Red Hand Commando members, and he remained on the run for four months.

== Imprisonment ==
In 1973, Rea was imprisoned for eight years after being found in possession of a Sterling submachine gun and for having driven two cars to and from the scene of a loyalist attack on Divis Street in nationalist west Belfast. On 18 February 1973, Catholic postmen Michael Coleman and David McAleese were gunned down and killed by a passing car. Rea was tried in a Diplock Court where he had protested his innocence to no avail. Despite his association with the Red Hand Commando, he joined Spence in the UVF section of Long Kesh.

=== Progressive Unionist Party formation ===
A number of senior Red Hand Commando members including Winston Rea played an integral part in the formation of the Progressive Unionist Party (PUP) in 1979. The beginnings of the party were in the compounds of Long Kesh, where members such as William Smith joined members of the UVF in taking a new political direction under

In 1981, Rea was released from prison. The same year, he appeared on an edition of Ulster Television's Counterpoint current affairs programme, arguing against Ian Paisley's evocation of a "Carson trail", and calling for young people not to follow his path. He staged a silent protest against Paisley, by hanging a placard outside his home near Carlisle Circus at the bottom of the Crumlin Road. The placard read: "Remember the loyalist prisoners for after all 50 per cent of them are ex-Orangemen". Carlisle Circus is the assembly point for Orangemen at the start of their annual 12 July parade.

== CLMC ceasefire ==
Rea played a role in negotiating the Combined Loyalist Military Command ceasefire, in 1994. He became active in the PUP, linked to the Ulster Volunteer Force, and was the last candidate on the party's "top-up" list for the Northern Ireland Forum election of 1996, but was not elected. However, he formed part of the PUP's Good Friday Agreement negotiating team.

== Later activity ==
In 1998, Rea was arrested and questioned about the murder of Frankie Curry, a former Red Hand Commando member and a relative by marriage of Rea. He was subsequently released, without charge. During a loyalist feud, in 2000, Rea's house was broken into by members of the C Company of the rival Ulster Freedom Fighters, led by Johnny Adair. They destroyed many of his possessions. Retaliation was swift during the feud and some years later when a Red Hand Commando member beat a C Company commander, Mo Courtney.

Rea later founded the 1st Shankill Northern Ireland Supporters' Club, and acted as its treasurer.

In 2011, he attended the wake of Michaela McAreavey, where he was warmly embraced by Martin McGuinness. McAreavey was the daughter of Mickey Harte, the Tyrone GAA manager. She was murdered while on her honeymoon in Mauritius.

=== Murder charges ===
In 2015 police attempted to gain access to interview tapes held at Boston College in relation to an investigation into Rea's activities. Police had stated that Rea was being investigated over offences of "the utmost gravity" after challenging an injunction Rea had obtained to prevent the transfer of the tapes. The tapes were part of the Belfast Project, an oral history project by the college in which both loyalists and republicans had been interviewed about their experiences and activities during the Troubles. The tapes had already been at the centre of controversy after police had attempted to obtain some in relation to the murder of Jean McConville. Police were awarded permission to hear the tapes by the courts in February 2015.

In June 2016, following detailed examination of the tapes by police, Rea was charged with the murders of two Catholic civilians during the Troubles, two attempted murders, membership of the Red Hand Commando and several other lesser charges, with twelve charges in total brought against him.

Rea was allowed bail and the trial was temporarily adjourned in 2021 due to the coronavirus pandemic.

=== Death ===
Rea, still on trial, died on 1 December 2023, just over a week after the death of his wife.
