= Timothy Creasey =

British Army general (1923–1986)

General Sir Timothy Creasey KCB OBE
- Born: 21 September 1923
- Died: 5 October 1986 (aged 63)
- Military career
- Allegiance: United Kingdom
- Branch: British Army
- Service years: 1942–1985
- Rank: General
- Nickname: "The Bull"
- Service number: 350206
- Units: 10th Baluch Regiment; Royal Norfolk Regiment; Royal Anglian Regiment
- Commands: Chief of the Defence Staff, Sultan of Oman's Armed Forces (1981–85); UK Land Forces (1980–81); Northern Ireland (1977–79); Sultan's Armed Forces, Muscat and Oman (1972–75); 11th Armoured Brigade (1969–70)
- Conflicts: Second World War; Border Campaign (IRA); Dhofar Rebellion; Operation Banner; Aden Emergency
- Awards: Knight Commander of the Order of the Bath; Officer of the Order of the British Empire

General Sir Timothy May Creasey, KCB, OBE (21 September 1923 – 5 October 1986) was a British Army officer who served as General Officer Commanding of the British Army in Northern Ireland, as well as the commander of the Sultan of Oman's Armed Forces.

== Regimental career ==
Creasey was born in 1923, and educated at Clifton College. He was commissioned in the British Indian Army on 1942, as a junior officer in the 10th Baluch Regiment. He served with them in South-East Asia, Italy and Greece, before transferring into the British Army and joining the Royal Norfolk Regiment.

In 1955, he was a major in 39th Infantry Brigade, which served in Kenya during the Mau Mau Uprising, and in the following year experienced a different form of unconventional warfare whilst posted to Northern Ireland, during the 1956 IRA border campaign. After a spell as an instructor at the Staff College, he was promoted to command the 1st Battalion of the newly formed Royal Anglian Regiment in 1965, and saw service in the Aden Emergency. He earned an Officer of the Order of the British Empire for his service in the 1966 Birthday Honours.

== Senior command ==
After Aden, he was promoted to command 11th Armoured Brigade in the British Army of the Rhine, a post he held from 1968 until 1970, and then attended the Royal College of Defence Studies in 1971. In 1972, he was appointed major-general and seconded to Oman, where he acted as Commander of the Sultan's Armed Forces. The new Sultan, Qaboos bin Said, had been trained at Sandhurst and served in the British Army, and as part of the revitalisation of his forces during the Dhofar Rebellion he requested a large number of British military advisors. Creasey's period in Oman was effective; he quickly established a centralised command of the Army, and helped take the initiative against the Dhofari rebels. His previous experience with the Indian Army proved an asset, as a sizeable proportion of the Omani army was made up of Baluchis. He left in February 1975, with the campaign winding down.

After a brief spell as Director of Infantry, he was appointed on 1 November 1977 to succeed Sir David House as General Officer Commanding in Northern Ireland.

His experience as a commander had largely been in small-scale "colonial wars", and as such he was a contentious choice for the position. He aimed to get quick results, and his belief that a military solution could be found to the problem put him at odds with the commander of the Royal Ulster Constabulary, Sir Kenneth Newman. This dispute peaked in 1979, after 18 soldiers were killed in the Warrenpoint ambush, when Creasey demanded the Army take over control of policing. However, he had a good working relationship with Roy Mason, the Secretary of State for Northern Ireland. He was replaced as commander by Lieutenant-General Sir Richard Lawson on 1 December 1979.

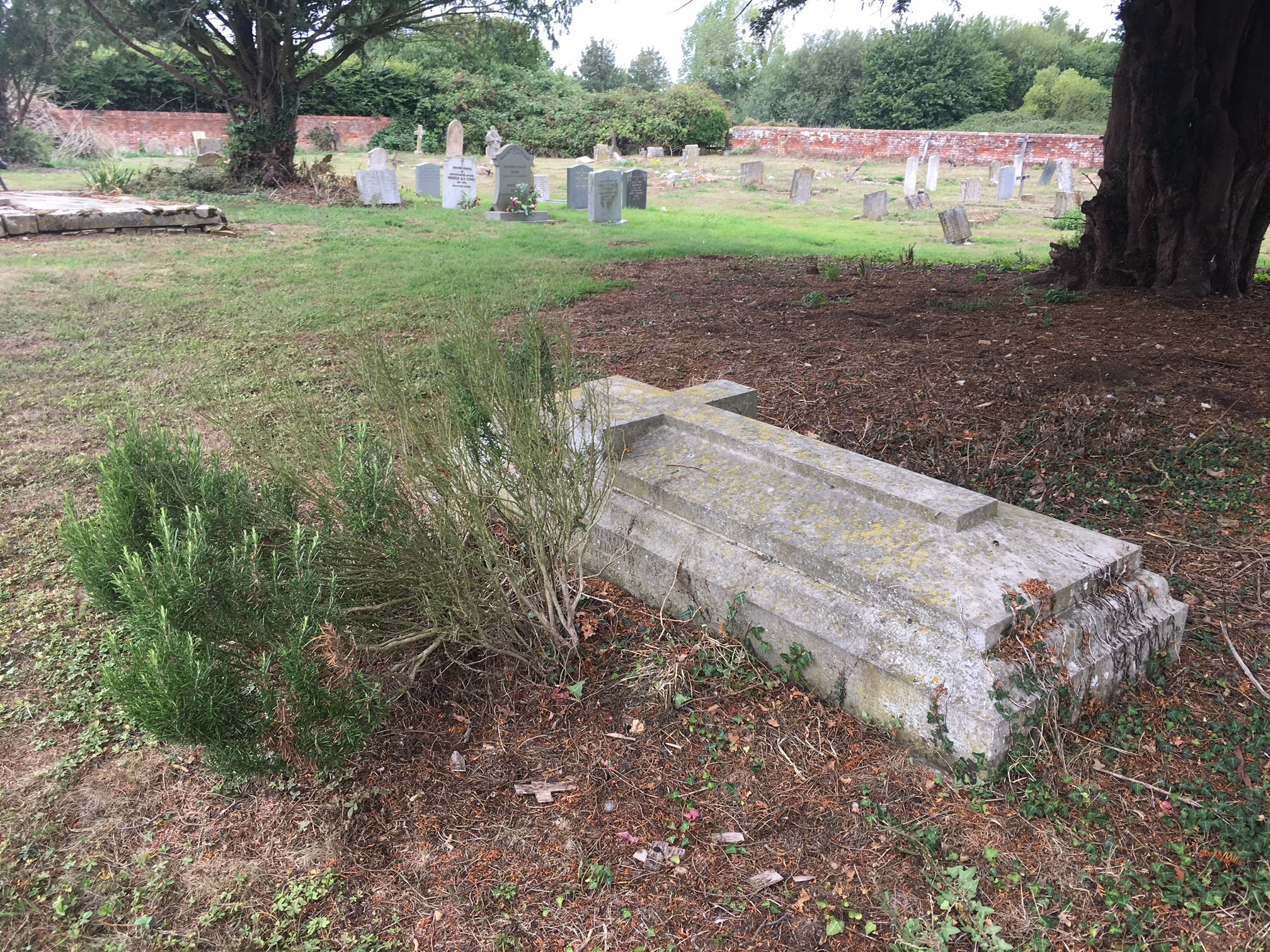
The grave of General Sir Timothy Creasey in the churchyard of St Andrew's, Belchamp St Paul, Essex.

He was appointed as Commander-in-Chief, UK Land Forces in 1980, but left this shortly thereafter to return to Oman, at the personal request of the Sultan. Creasey had waived retirement to become Deputy Commander-in-Chief and Chief of Defence Staff, in the Sultan of Oman's Armed Forces in 1981, and oversaw a far-reaching reform of the Ministry of Defence and a modernisation of the army. Among other features, the redesigned system gave him complete control of arms procurement, which with the approval of the Sultan, ensured that many contracts went to British firms. Perhaps unsurprisingly, his role in Oman was controversial in the country, with many senior Omanis criticising his methods.

Military offices
Preceded by David House	GOC British Army in Northern Ireland; 1977–1979	Succeeded by Richard Lawson
Preceded by Sir John Archer	C-in-C, UK Land Forces; 1980–1981	Succeeded by Sir John Stanier
Honorary titles
Preceded by Jack Dye	Colonel of the Royal Anglian Regiment; 1982–1986	Succeeded by Sir John Akehurst
