= Seamus Ludlow =

Irish forester and murder victim (1929–1976)

- Born: 4 December 1928; County Louth, Ireland
- Died: 2 May 1976 (aged 47); Dundalk, Ireland

Seamus Ludlow (4 December 1928 – 2 May 1976) was an Irish forester who was found murdered in Dundalk, Ireland. The crime was never solved, prompting allegations that the Irish Government failed to fully investigate it.

A native of Culfore, Dundalk, County Louth, Ludlow was without paramilitary or political connections. His body was found close to his home. "No one has ever been charged in connection with his death. The family, who have campaigned for years to have the murder investigated, say there has always been speculation he was killed by either the British Army or loyalist paramilitaries ... [and] claimed gardaí failed to follow up on an important line of inquiry - that Mr Ludlow was the victim of either loyalists or the British forces who mistook him for a senior member of the Irish Republican Army".

An action in Dublin's High Court in February 2017 was described as "what may be a last-ditch attempt by the family ... why Garda Síochána detectives suddenly dropped their investigation ... An Oireachtas Joint House Committee which held hearings on the circumstances of Mr Ludlow’s killing in 2006 and also based their findings on a report compiled by retired High Court judge, Henry Barron, recommended that two commissions of inquiry be established by the government. But this was never done".
