= Harry Stockman (loyalist) =

Ulster Volunteer Force member

- Born: c. 1961; Belfast, Northern Ireland
- Known for: UVF member and commander of 1st Battalion Shankill Road

Harry Stockman, also known as "Harmless" (born c. 1961) is a Northern Irish loyalist and a senior member of the Ulster Volunteer Force (UVF) paramilitary organisation. He serves as the commander of the UVF 1st Battalion Shankill Road and is allegedly the second-in-command on the UVF Brigade Staff. His uncle was Robert "Basher" Bates, a member of the notorious Shankill Butchers gang.

At a news conference in June 2009, Stockman read out a decommissioning statement issued by the UVF and Red Hand Commando (RHC) leadership in which it claimed the organisations had put all of their weapons out of use.

Stockman survived a murder attempt in April 2011 when he was stabbed repeatedly outside a crowded supermarket by another UVF man as a revenge attack stemming from an internal dispute.

== Early years ==
Stockman was born in about 1961 in Belfast, Northern Ireland to a Protestant family and was brought up in the Greater Shankill area. Some of his family members were closely affiliated with militant loyalism, his uncle having been Robert "Basher" Bates, a member of the UVF-linked Shankill Butchers gang which carried out a series of cut-throat killings against Catholics in the mid-1970s.

Stockman joined the UVF Belfast Brigade on an unknown date.

== Ulster Volunteer Force ==
Stockman rose in the UVF ranks to become commander of the 1st Battalion Shankill Road. He was jailed in the early 1980s on the evidence of UVF supergrass William "Budgie" Allen, but was released without having been charged along with other loyalists after the prosecution case against them broke down when the judge found Allen's evidence to have been "totally unreliable". Acquiring the nickname "Harmless", Stockman has been reported as the second-in-command on the UVF Brigade Staff, coming after the reputed Chief of Staff John "Bunter" Graham. Journalist Brian Rowan described Stockman as being "one of the most senior and influential leaders in the UVF organisation", while another source within the UVF suggested that he "has done a lot for peace that people don't give any credit to".

Stockman's influence within the UVF was such that he exerted a strong influence in the making and implementing of major decisions at Brigade Staff level, including demilitarising UVF members and decommissioning its weapons. At a news conference held on 27 June 2009 using the UVF's codename of "Captain William Johnston", Stockman read out the decommissioning statement issued by the UVF and Red Hand Commando leadership maintaining that the two organisations had put all of the weapons under their control out of use.

== Stabbing attack ==
At 4.30 pm on 20 April 2011, outside a Tesco supermarket on the Ballygomartin Road (a road to the immediate north-west of the Shankill Road), Stockman was stabbed by UVF man David "Dee" Madine (40). Stockman's five-year-old grandson witnessed the attempt on his life along with numerous shoppers. As Madine stabbed Stockman repeatedly in the front and back, he shouted, "That's for Bobby". This was a reference to Bobby Moffett, an ex RHC member and Madine's close friend, who was gunned down on the Shankill Road the previous year. The UVF were blamed for his killing and Stockman had quarrelled violently with Moffett before the latter was shot dead by masked gunmen on the crowded street. Although police later confirmed he was a suspect in the killing and had been taken in for questioning shortly after the fatal shooting, Stockman was never charged in connection with Moffett's murder. Madine, however held him responsible and upon seeing him at the supermarket accused him of ordering the killing and of waging a campaign to intimidate him and his family off the Shankill. Then after Madine left his shopping bags in his car, he returned to Tesco and proceeded to stab Stockman more than 10 times with a four-inch-bladed pocket knife he normally carried. He was arrested by police as he calmly walked bare-chested towards Twaddell Avenue (a street that faces the branch of Tesco and which links the Ballygomartin Road to the Crumlin Road close to Ardoyne), carrying the knife, and his T-shirt, with his hand covered in Stockman's blood.

After sustaining serious injuries to his kidneys, bowel and colon, Stockman was rushed to Belfast's Royal Victoria Hospital where he underwent emergency life-saving surgery. As soon as his condition was stabilised, the UVF Brigade Staff convened a meeting at the Rex Bar on the Shankill Road where they discussed means of retaliation against Madine for having attacked such a high-ranking leader as Stockman. Madine, described as a "hard man", is the son of prominent UVF member Billy "Dog" Madine who had a seat on the Brigade Staff in the 1970s and is still highly regarded by loyalists.

At his court appearance the following day at Belfast Magistrates Court where he faced charges of attempted murder, Madine admitted his intention to kill Stockman after "something cracked in his head" adding that he had wanted him dead. He offered his apologies to Tesco staff and customers, yet loudly denounced Stockman as a "fucking tout". In a statement he also maintained that he had known Stockman personally for over 20 years. Homes belonging to Madine's family and friends were petrol-bombed by Stockman supporters including that belonging to his girlfriend, although she and their children had already fled when the attack occurred. Madine was refused bail and remanded to Maghaberry Prison.

In July 2012, Stockman was still waiting to claim his compensation payment of £13,500 which his solicitor had applied for at the Northern Ireland Office for the injuries he received in the stabbing. Victim's rights campaigner Raymond McCord, whose son Raymond Jr. was killed by the UVF in 1997, staunchly opposed the cash payout.
