= George Seawright =

Scottish-born loyalist politician and paramilitary (1951–1987)

Member of Belfast City Council
- In office 15 May 1985 – October 1986
- Preceded by: District created
- Succeeded by: Elizabeth Seawright
- Constituency: Court
- In office 20 May 1981 – 15 May 1985
- Preceded by: James Weir
- Succeeded by: District abolished
- Constituency: Belfast Area E

Member of the Northern Ireland Assembly for Belfast North
- In office 1982–1986

Personal details
- Born: c. 1951 Glasgow, Scotland
- Died: 3 December 1987 Belfast, Northern Ireland
- Cause of death: Assassination (gunshot wounds)
- Party: Protestant Unionist (1985–1987); Democratic Unionist Party (until 1984)
- Spouse: Elizabeth Seawright
- Children: 3

'True Brit' newspaper cover, 1997

George Seawright (c.1951 – 3 December 1987) was a Scottish-born unionist politician in Northern Ireland and loyalist paramilitary in the Ulster Volunteer Force. He was assassinated by the Irish People's Liberation Organisation in 1987.

== Early life ==
Born in Glasgow, Scotland, from an Ulster Protestant background, Seawright lived in Drumchapel and worked in the shipyards of Clydeside. Also living for a time in Springburn, he was one of the few Scots to join the Ulster Protestant Volunteers in the late 1960s.

He then worked in the Harland and Wolff shipyard in Belfast until entering politics as a member of the Democratic Unionist Party (DUP). As well as being a shipyard worker he also served as a lay preacher and was an elder in north Belfast's John Knox Memorial Free Presbyterian Church. Seawright was also a member of an Orange Lodge in the Ballysillan area of North Belfast and the Apprentice Boys of Derry. He lived in the unionist Glencairn estate in the northwest of the city with his wife and three children.

== Politics and controversy ==
Seawright was noted for his fiery rhetoric. He was elected to Belfast City Council in 1981, and soon developed a following amongst unionists. The following year he was elected as the Democratic Unionist Party (DUP) candidate to the 1982 Northern Ireland Assembly. Seawright, who had initially campaigned for John McQuade before securing his own candidacy, had problems with the party leadership from the beginning of his political career. Seawright stated that he was viewed as lacking respectability due to his rough personality, his residence in social housing, and that he was in arrears to the Northern Ireland Housing Executive.

Seawright courted controversy throughout his fairly brief career. He was strongly criticised for an interview he gave to Nationalism Today, a journal produced in support of the Political Soldier wing of the British National Front (NF). In it, Seawright praised the NF, not only due to their support for Ulster loyalism, but also for their stance on race and immigration. His younger brother David Seawright was an active member of the NF.

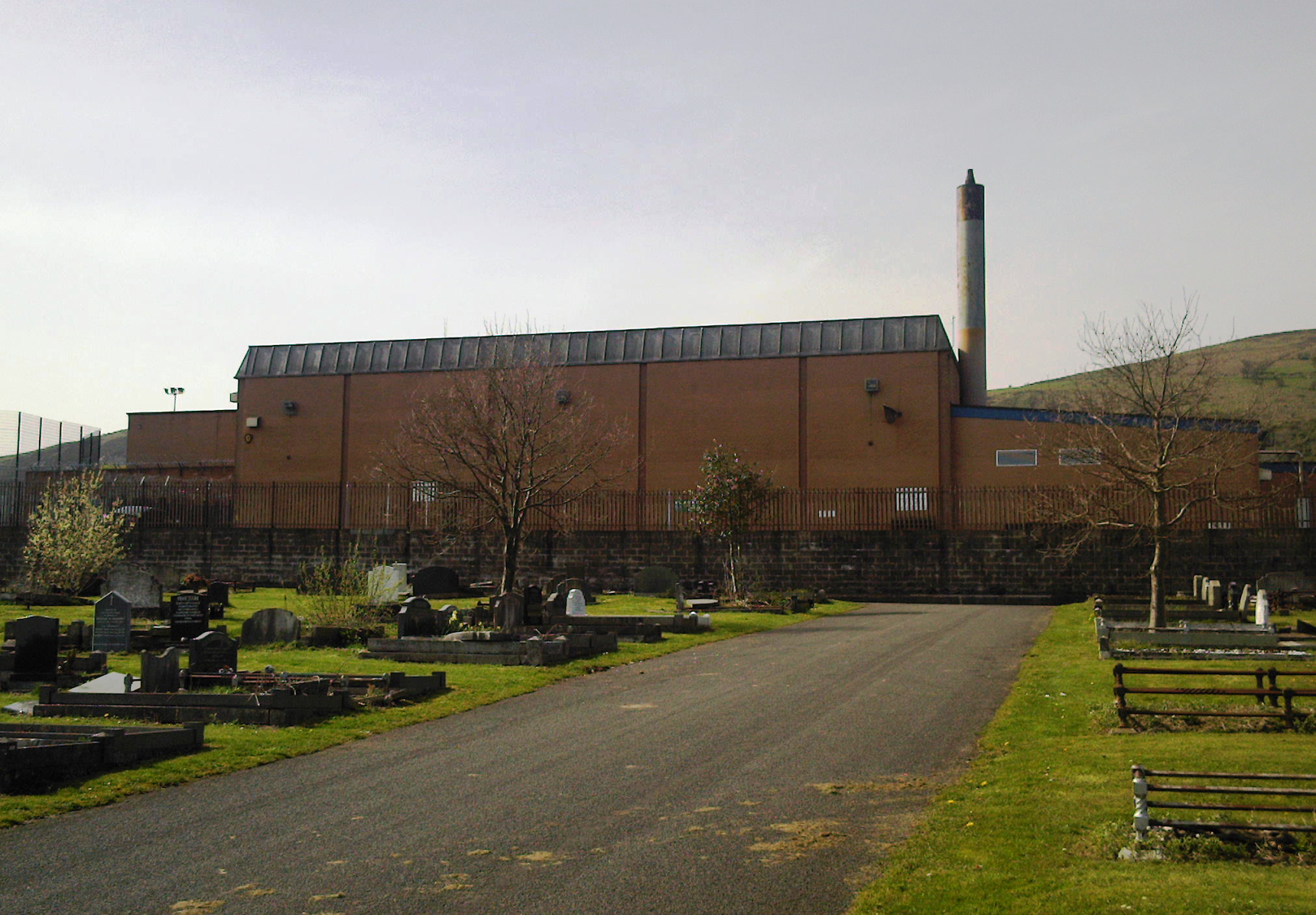
Whiterock leisure centre, the scene of Seawright's flag raid

In 1984, following the erection of an Irish tricolour on Whiterock leisure centre, Seawright, along with UVF men John Bingham and William 'Frenchie' Marchant, wielded handguns to physically remove it. Despite their efforts, two flags were put up to replace it soon afterwards. Following a heated exchange, in which People's Democracy councillor John McAnulty described the Union Flag as "a butcher's apron", McAnulty stated that Seawright delivered a veiled death threat, saying: "I have a soft spot for you Mr McAnulty, it's in Milltown Cemetery."

He continued to court controversy when he told a meeting of the Belfast Education and Library Board in 1984 that Irish Catholics who objected to the singing of the British national anthem "are just fenian scum who have been indoctrinated by the Catholic Church. Taxpayers' money would be better spent on an incinerator and burning the lot of them. Their priests should be thrown in and burnt as well." Seawright denied making these comments, although they were widely reported by the press at the time. The comments had been sparked by a debate before the board about building a new incinerator at a Catholic primary school. He was prosecuted and received a six-month suspended sentence as a result.

== DUP withdraw support ==
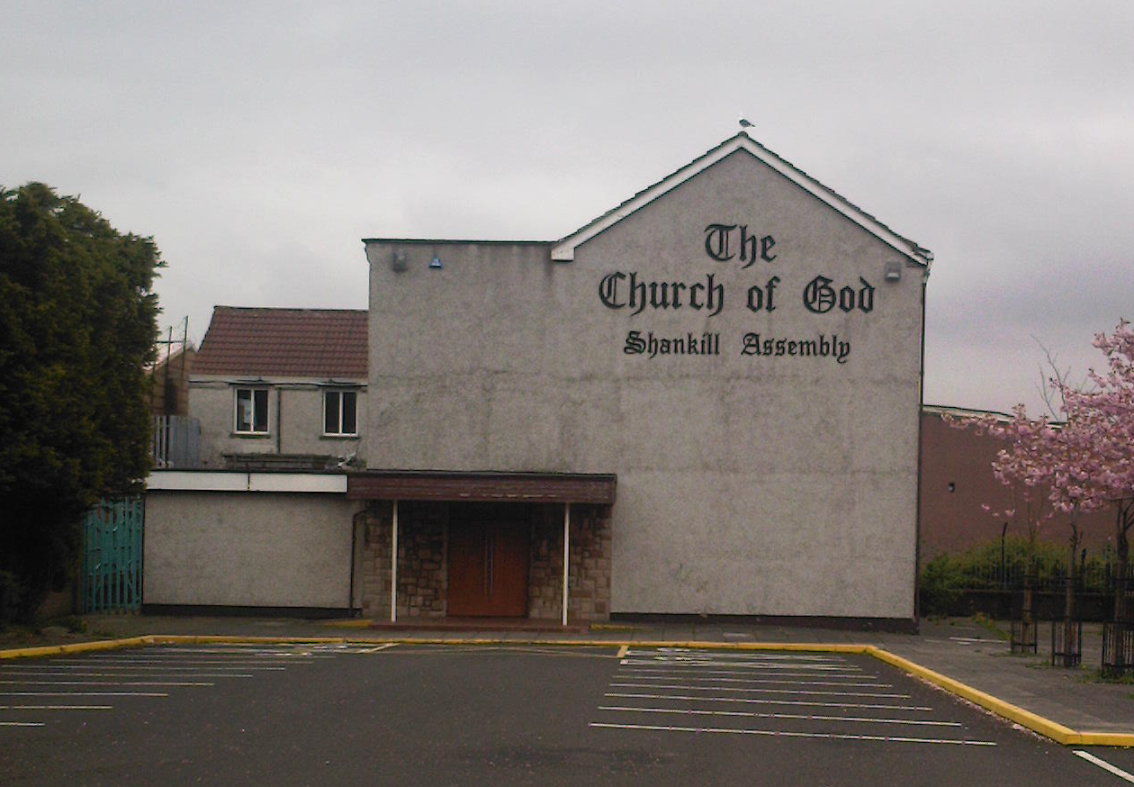
Church of God, Conway Street, Shankill Road, where Seawright worshipped after splitting from the Free Presbyterian Church

Following these high-profile political mistakes, the DUP withdrew the party whip from Seawright, although he managed to hold onto his support base and was returned to the Council in 1985 as an independent under the Protestant Unionist label (previously used by the forerunner of the DUP). He was shunned by the DUP and UUP city councillors, and the only councillors who would talk to him were Sinn Féin. Nonetheless, he did not sever his ties with all DUP members and in mid-1985 joined Ivan Foster, Jim Wells and George Graham in a failed attempt to force a banned loyalist march through the mainly nationalist town of Castlewellan. Seawright did however split from the Free Presbyterian Church and instead worshipped at the Shankill Road's Church of God.

As a candidate for the Westminster elections, Seawright twice contested the North Belfast constituency. In 1983, as a DUP candidate, Seawright finished second with 8,260 votes behind Cecil Walker of the UUP, whilst in 1987 he finished third behind Walker and Alban Maginness (Social Democratic and Labour Party) with 5,671 votes as a Protestant Unionist candidate (although the DUP did not contest the seat due to an electoral pact between the DUP and UUP at the time). Seawright took the name Ulster Protestant League (which had been used by an earlier loyalist group) for his largely working-class Evangelical group of supporters, even though the name was not used for electoral purposes.

== Move toward paramilitarism ==
In the aftermath of the Anglo-Irish Agreement and his removal from the DUP, Seawright moved publicly closer to paramilitarism. He stated that he felt it would be impossible to resist the Agreement solely through non-violence and further argued that it would be inevitable for loyalists to break from Ian Paisley and Jim Molyneaux as the two leaders of unionism would never publicly endorse a violent response. For Seawright conflict was inevitable, especially with the growing electoral success of Sinn Féin which he argued would harden both communities' stances and bring about civil war.

Seawright further enhanced his notoriety when, on 20 November 1985, he took a leading role in the protests against the visit of the then Secretary of State for Northern Ireland Tom King to Belfast City Hall, where King was denounced for his part in the Anglo-Irish Agreement and attacked physically by Seawright and other protesters. For his part in the incident, Seawright was sentenced to nine months imprisonment in Magilligan Prison in October 1986. As a result of this jailing, Seawright was forced to vacate his seat on Belfast City Council. The Workers' Party blocked the co-option of his wife Elizabeth, who nevertheless beat the Workers' Party by 93% to 7% in the subsequent by-election (in which she also stood under the label of Protestant Unionist). She held the seat in 1989, but lost it in the 1993 local government election.

He courted further controversy in September 1986, when he publicly called for revenge after the killing of John Bingham, a leading UVF member and friend of Seawright, by the IRA. Raymond Mooney, a Catholic civilian, was killed soon after Seawright made the statement. He made similar remarks the following year when UVF member William "Frenchie" Marchant was killed by republicans, stating that he had "no hesitation in calling for revenge and retribution". Seawright's North Belfast campaign in 1987 also played up his hardline image, with Seawright dubbing himself "the man who will not be silenced". He further promised to follow an abstentionist policy if he were elected, in protest at the Anglo-Irish Agreement.

== Death ==
Following his release, Seawright made plans to regain his seat, although ultimately he was to be assassinated before the opportunity arrived. Martin Dillon states in his book, The Dirty War, that Seawright met with representatives of the Irish People's Liberation Organisation (IPLO) in the Europa Hotel after being informed by the Royal Ulster Constabulary (RUC) that he was on an IPLO hit list. It was alleged that during the meeting, Seawright agreed to provide low-level information to the IPLO in exchange for his safety. Nonetheless, on 19 November 1987, Seawright was shot while he waited in a car near a taxi firm on the Shankill Road (for whom he was due to begin working) by the IPLO, dying from his wounds on 3 December.

Dillon further stated that Seawright's details, as well as those of Bingham, Lenny Murphy and William Marchant, had been supplied to their killers by leading Ulster Defence Association member James Craig in return for the republicans guaranteeing his safety. According to an internal UDA document investigating claims of collusion with republicans, Craig had brought two other members to the car park of the Shankill Road leisure centre on the day Seawright was killed, a location only fifty yards away from the murder scene. The UVF blamed the killing on Martin "Rook" O'Prey, a leading IPLO hitman who was killed by the UVF at his home in 1991. They questioned Craig about his alleged involvement, but decided that he had not played any role in the killing.

In August 2006, the UVF listed Seawright in a list of its members who were killed during the "Troubles". It has also been stated by Henry McDonald and Jim Cusack that Seawright was an informer who passed information about loyalists to RUC Special Branch.

Northern Ireland Assembly (1982)
New assembly	MPA for Belfast North; 1982–1986	Assembly abolished
