= Harry Stockman =

Harry Stockman may refer to:

- Harry Stockman (loyalist) (born 1961), Northern Irish loyalist
- Harry Stockman (racing driver) (1919–1994), American racecar driver
- Harry Stockman (fl. 1948), scientist who worked on Radio-frequency identification
