= David J. Templeton =

Minister of the Presbyterian Church in Ireland (1954–97)

- Born: 1954; Larne, County Antrim, Northern Ireland
- Died: 24 March 1997 (aged 42)
- Education: Ulster Polytechnic (B.A.); Queen's University Belfast (M.Th); Princeton Theological Seminary (M.Div)
- Burial place: Gardenmore Presbyterian Church, Larne

Ecclesiastical career
- Religion: Presbyterianism
- Church: Presbyterian Church in Ireland
- Ordained: Minister (1985)
- Congregations: Trinity Presbyterian Church, Greyabbey; Duncairn & St Enoch's Presbyterian Church, Belfast

David J. Templeton (1954 – 24 March 1997) was a minister of the Presbyterian Church in Ireland who was murdered in 1997. He had come to public notice when he was 'outed' as a gay man by the Sunday Life newspaper.

== Life ==
David Templeton was born in Larne. After leaving school he had worked as a civil servant. In 1976, he had a kidney transplant, the donor being his mother. This led him to change direction in his life and study at the Open University intending to go into the Presbyterian ministry. After further studies he was ordained in 1985. As a minister he was a regular contributor to radio broadcasts on Downtown Radio and the BBC, and was an assistant editor for Irish Biblical Studies.

== Christian ministry ==
Templeton was a graduate of Ulster Polytechnic (B.A.), Queen's University of Belfast, (M.Th.), and Princeton Theological Seminary (M.Div.). He also served as Minister of Trinity Presbyterian Church in Greyabbey near Newtownards, County Down; and previously as Assistant Minister of Duncairn and St Enoch's Presbyterian Church in Belfast.

== Death ==
On 7 February 1997, three men wearing balaclavas entered his home in Ballyduff, Newtownabbey and beat him with baseball bats with spikes driven through them. Following the attack, which had the elements of a paramilitary punishment beating, Templeton was found with a fractured jaw, fractures to both legs and multiple cuts and abrasions to his arms and legs. At the time of the attack, he was Northern Ireland's longest surviving kidney transplant patient.

He remained in hospital for several weeks, but was then released as he appeared to be recovering. He died on 24 March, aged 42, after suffering a heart attack from injuries sustained from the beating. He was buried in Larne, County Antrim. 500 mourners attended his funeral in Gardenmore Presbyterian Church. No group has claimed responsibility for his murder, but it is widely believed that the assault was carried out by elements of the Ulster Volunteer Force (UVF), a loyalist paramilitary group.

When the attack took place, Templeton had recently stepped down as Minister of Trinity Presbyterian Church in Greyabbey following a front-page story in the Sunday Life newspaper which revealed that he had recently been stopped by customs officials at Belfast International Airport in possession of a gay pornographic video. Templeton co-operated with the authorities and acknowledged that he had purchased the video quite legally from a high street chain store while he was on holiday in Amsterdam. After investigation, including a search of his church manse, the Royal Ulster Constabulary (RUC) determined to take no further action. A customs official subsequently approached the Sunday Life newspaper and received payment for detailing the incident and revealing Templeton's identity. Following exposure by the press, he stood down as minister of his congregation, having been told by congregational leaders that his position was untenable. Left without a home, he moved into a rented council house in the Ballyduff estate while exploring alternative career opportunities.

== Allegations of police collusion ==
In 2002, David Templeton's murder was re-examined using the latest forensic science techniques, but this did not lead to any arrests. In 2004, Johnston Brown, a retired detective sergeant, claimed that the RUC covered up murders by Mark Haddock, a UVF commander and informer for RUC Special Branch. Templeton identified Haddock in hospital as his assailant.

In January 2007, the Police Ombudsman issued a report implicating several special branch officers in failing to act on evidence that linked an informer to at least ten murders, but contrary to earlier press speculation the murder of David Templeton was not one of those mentioned, although it did state that further cases are being investigated. As of March 2022, no-one has ever been charged for the murder of David Templeton.
