= Mark Haddock =

Northern Irish loyalist

Mark Haddock (born 1968) is an Ulster loyalist paramilitary leader and RUC Special Branch informer in Northern Ireland, who has been named by various sources in connection with more than twenty-one killings. He is a member of the Ulster Volunteer Force (UVF), and was that organisation's North Belfast commander before his arrest by police in 2005.

== Early years ==
Mark Haddock was born and raised in the Mount Vernon estate by his mother and his stepfather, having a younger sister in a working-class housing development in north Belfast dominated by the UVF. He was educated at Lowwood Primary School (1973–1980) and Dunlambert Secondary School for Boys (1980–1985).

== Mount Vernon UVF ==
As leader of the UVF in Mount Vernon, Haddock presided over one of the organisation's most active units in the latter stages of the Troubles. Although frequently discussed in the Sunday World by Martin O'Hagan, he was never referred to by name until 20 August 2003, when his picture appeared on the front cover of the Belfast Telegraph, alongside a story identifying him as the head of the Mount Vernon UVF. Loyalist supergrass and RUC Special Branch informer Gary Haggarty also named Haddock as being involved in the May 1994 murders of Catholic civilians Eamon Fox and Gary Convie in Belfast.

The March 1997 attempted bombing of the Sinn Féin office in Monaghan Town was believed to have been carried out by the Mount Vernon UVF, specifically Mark Haddock along with John Bond and Darren Moore. On the morning of the attack a loud bang was heard around 9 am by a local resident, who found the remains of a hold-all bag containing wires and a grey coloured putty like substance in an alleyway behind the office. Investigations revealed that the device contained 25 sticks of PowerGel explosives weighing a total of 2.5kg, however only the detonator exploded.

In October 2005, Labour TD Pat Rabbitte, using Dáil privilege, named Haddock as an RUC Special Branch agent and as responsible for the killings of Sharon McKenna in 1993, Catholic builders Gary Convie and Eamon Fox in 1994, the alleged informer Thomas Sheppard in 1996, Protestant clergyman Rev David J. Templeton in 1997, Billy Harbinson in 1997, Raymond McCord Jnr in 1997, former UDA commander Tommy English in 2000, and David Greer in 2000. The claim that Haddock was an informer with a Special Branch "handler" was also made by the Sunday World, campaigner Raymond McCord, the Belfast Telegraph, The Independent and Ulster Television.

=== Trevor Gowdy attack ===
Pub doorman Trevor Gowdy was attacked at a social club in Monkstown in December 2002 following an earlier confrontation with members of Haddock's group at a bar in Ballyclare. He was hit on the head and body with an iron bar, a hatchet and a bat, and suffered an "open" fractured skull and broken leg as well as various cuts and bruises. Police found him lying unconscious on the ground. Haddock was subsequently charged with the attempted murder of Gowdy. However on Friday, 29 September 2006, Haddock was cleared of Gowdy's attempted murder and found guilty of false imprisonment and "grievous bodily harm with intent". On Monday, 20 November 2006, Haddock was jailed for ten years for his part in the attack.

On Tuesday 30 May 2006, while on bail for the attempted murder of Gowdy, Haddock was shot six times while travelling in Newtownabbey, to the north of Belfast. Ronald Trevor Bowe, 29, from Mount Vernon Gardens, Belfast, was arrested and charged for Haddock's attempted murder. He was subsequently released on 22 November 2006 after Haddock indicated he did not wish to pursue a case against him.

== Historical Enquires Team trial ==
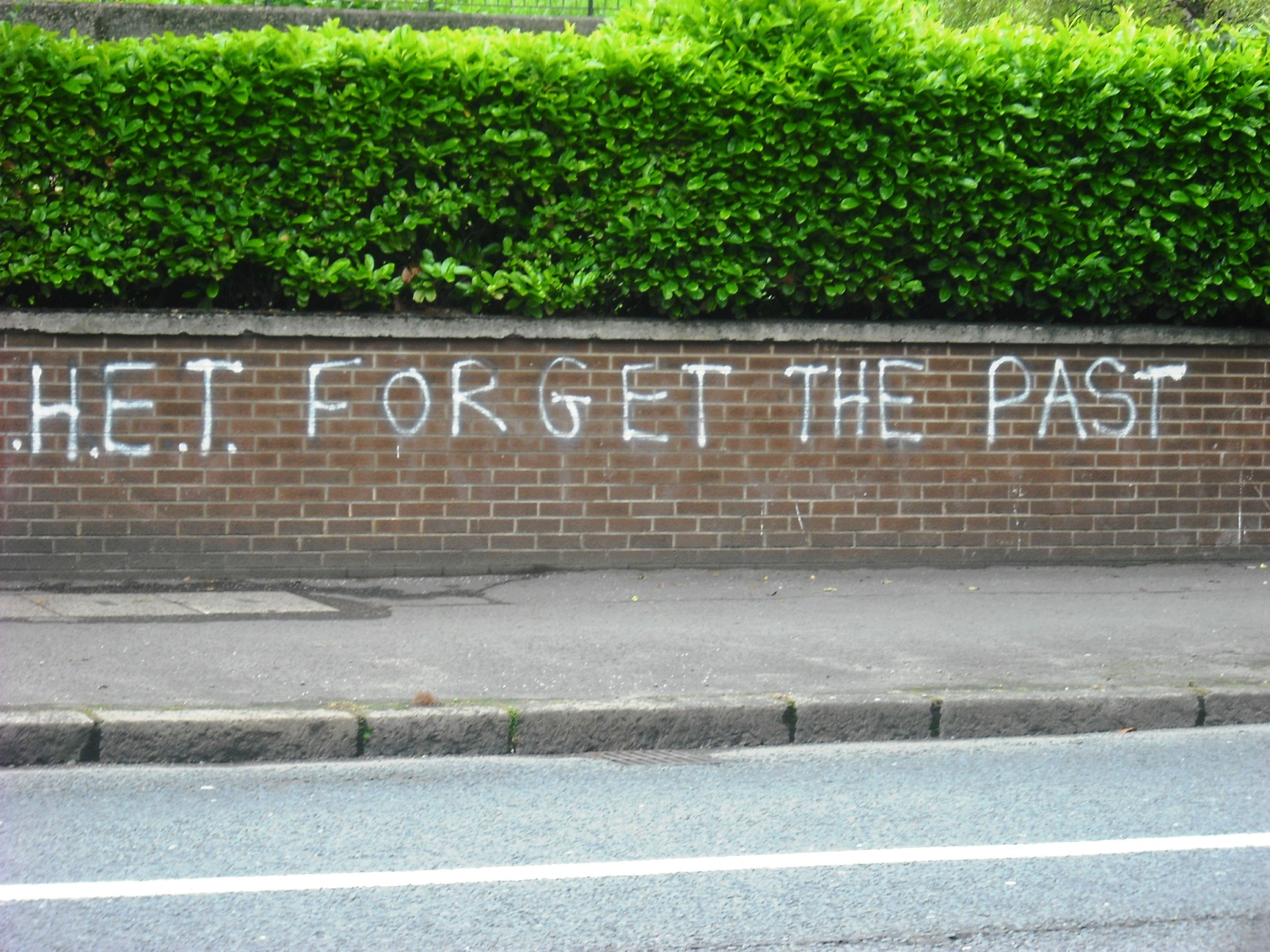
Graffiti against the Historical Enquires Team on Haddock's native Mount Vernon estate

In January 2009, Haddock was charged in connection with the killing of Tommy English. He was taken back into custody on 2 September 2011 as he prepared to face charges for the murder.

On 21 July 2009, Haddock was arrested by officers from the Historical Enquiries Team (HET). He was questioned about the murders of John Harbinson in May 1997, Gary Convie and Eamon Fox in May 1994 and Sharon McKenna in January 1993, as well as a number of assaults and a shooting. The following day he was charged with the murder of a 39-year-old man in 1997. Haddock was slated to appear in court in Belfast on 23 July 2009, accused of killing John Harbinson. The Protestant was beaten to death in the Mount Vernon estate where Haddock's notorious gang wielded power.

The HET trial ended in February 2012 when Haddock and all but one of his co-defendants were acquitted of the charges against them. The judge called into question the evidence provided by Robert and Ian Stewart, two brothers who were members of the Mount Vernon UVF before turning "supergrass", denouncing them for their "bad character" and fabrication of evidence. Separate charges against Haddock for the killing of John Harbinson remained outstanding until 5 December 2012, when the Public Prosecution Service withdrew their case. This was on a "without prejudice" basis, allowing the police to continue their investigations and also allowing for the possibility of future charges against Haddock.
