= Gary Haggarty =

Gary Haggarty (born c. 1973) is a former leader of an Ulster Volunteer Force unit in the Mount Vernon area of north Belfast and police "supergrass". In January 2018 he was sentenced to more than six years in jail after admitting to over 200 offences, including committing five murders.

In May 2018, Haggarty was released from prison and has been put into a witness protection programme.

In 2023 he testified at the trial of Loyalist James Stewart Smyth, who was accused of murdering two Catholic workers in 1994. Haggarty told the court that Smyth and Mark Haddock had plotted the murders and that he had supplied Smyth with the weapons used to kill the two men. During the incident, approximately 32 bullets (a full magazine) was fired from a Sten sub machine gun into a parked car with three men inside eating their lunch. Afterwards, a man dressed in dark clothing (allegedly James Smyth) was then seen running from the scene via a nearby children's playground. James Smyth was found not guilty of all charges in February 2024, with the judge highlighting inconsistencies between Haggarty's evidence and that of other witnesses.
