= Pat McGeown =

Provisional IRA volunteer (1956–1996)

Belfast City Councillor
- In office 1993–1996
- Constituency: Lower Falls

Personal details
- Born: Patrick McGeown; 3 September 1956 Beechmount, Belfast, Northern Ireland
- Died: 1 October 1996 (aged 40) Belfast, Northern Ireland
- Resting place: Milltown Cemetery
- Party: Sinn Féin
- Nickname: Pat Beag

Military service
- Allegiance: Fianna Éireann (1970–1973); Provisional Irish Republican Army (1973–1996)
- Branch/service: Belfast Brigade
- Battles/wars: The Troubles

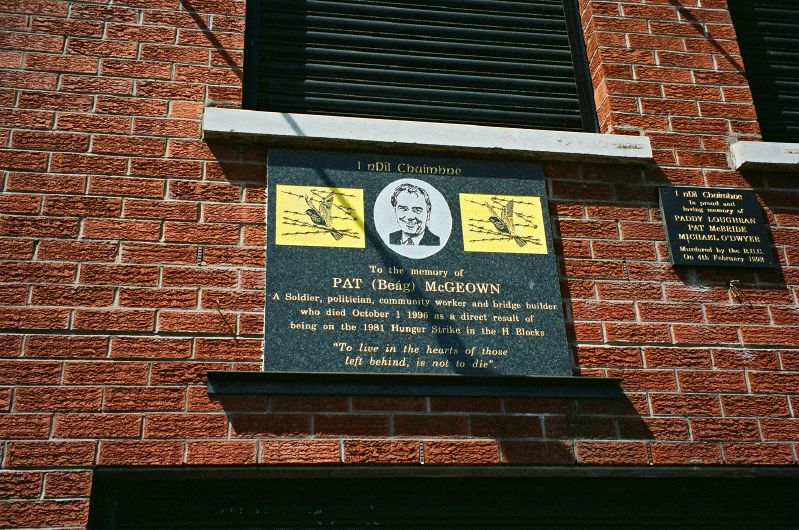
A plaque in memory of McGeown

Pat "Beag" McGeown (3 September 1956 – 1 October 1996) was a volunteer in the Provisional Irish Republican Army (IRA) who took part in the 1981 Irish hunger strike.

== Background and IRA activity ==
McGeown was born in the Beechmount area of Belfast, Northern Ireland on 3 September 1956, and joined the IRA's youth wing Fianna Éireann in 1970. He was first arrested aged 14, and in 1973 he was again arrested and interned in Long Kesh until 1974. In November 1975 McGeown was arrested and charged with possession of explosives, bombing the Europa Hotel, and IRA membership. At his trial in 1976 he was convicted and received a five-year sentence for IRA membership and two concurrent fifteen-year sentences for the bombing and possession of explosives, and was imprisoned at Long Kesh with Special Category Status.

In March 1978 he attempted to escape along with Brendan McFarlane and Larry Marley. The three had wire cutters and dressed as prison officers, complete with wooden guns. The escape was unsuccessful, and resulted in McGeown receiving an additional six-month sentence and the loss of his Special Category Status.

== Prison protests ==
McGeown was transferred into the Maze Prison's H-Blocks where he joined the blanket protest and dirty protest, attempting to secure the return of Special Category Status for convicted paramilitary prisoners. McGeown described the conditions inside the prison during the dirty protest in a 1985 interview:

There were times when you would vomit. There were times when you were so run down that you would lie for days and not do anything with the maggots crawling all over you. The rain would be coming in the window and you would be lying there with the maggots all over the place.

In late 1980 the protest escalated and seven prisoners took part in a fifty-three-day hunger strike, aimed at restoring political status by securing what were known as the "Five Demands":

1. The right not to wear a prison uniform;
2. The right not to do prison work;
3. The right of free association with other prisoners, and to organise educational and recreational pursuits;
4. The right to one visit, one letter and one parcel per week;
5. Full restoration of remission lost through the protest.

The strike ended before any prisoners had died and without political status being secured, and a second hunger strike began on 1 March 1981 led by Bobby Sands, the IRA's former Officer Commanding (OC) in the prison. McGeown joined the strike on 9 July, after Sands and four other prisoners had starved themselves to death. Following the deaths of five other prisoners, McGeown's family authorised medical intervention to save his life after he lapsed into a coma on 20 August, the 42nd day of his hunger strike.

== Freedom ==
McGeown was released from prison in 1985, resuming his active role in the IRA's campaign and also working for Sinn Féin, the republican movement's political wing. In 1988 McGeown was charged with organising the Corporals killings, an incident where two plain-clothes British Army soldiers were killed by the IRA. At an early stage of the trial his solicitor Pat Finucane argued there was insufficient evidence against McGeown, and the charges were dropped in November 1988. McGeown and Finucane were photographed together outside Crumlin Road Courthouse, a contributing factor to Finucane being killed by the Ulster Defence Association in February 1989. Despite suffering from heart disease as a result of his participation in the hunger strike, McGeown was a member of Sinn Féin's Ard Chomhairle and active in its Prisoner of War Department, and in 1993 he was elected to Belfast City Council.

== Death ==
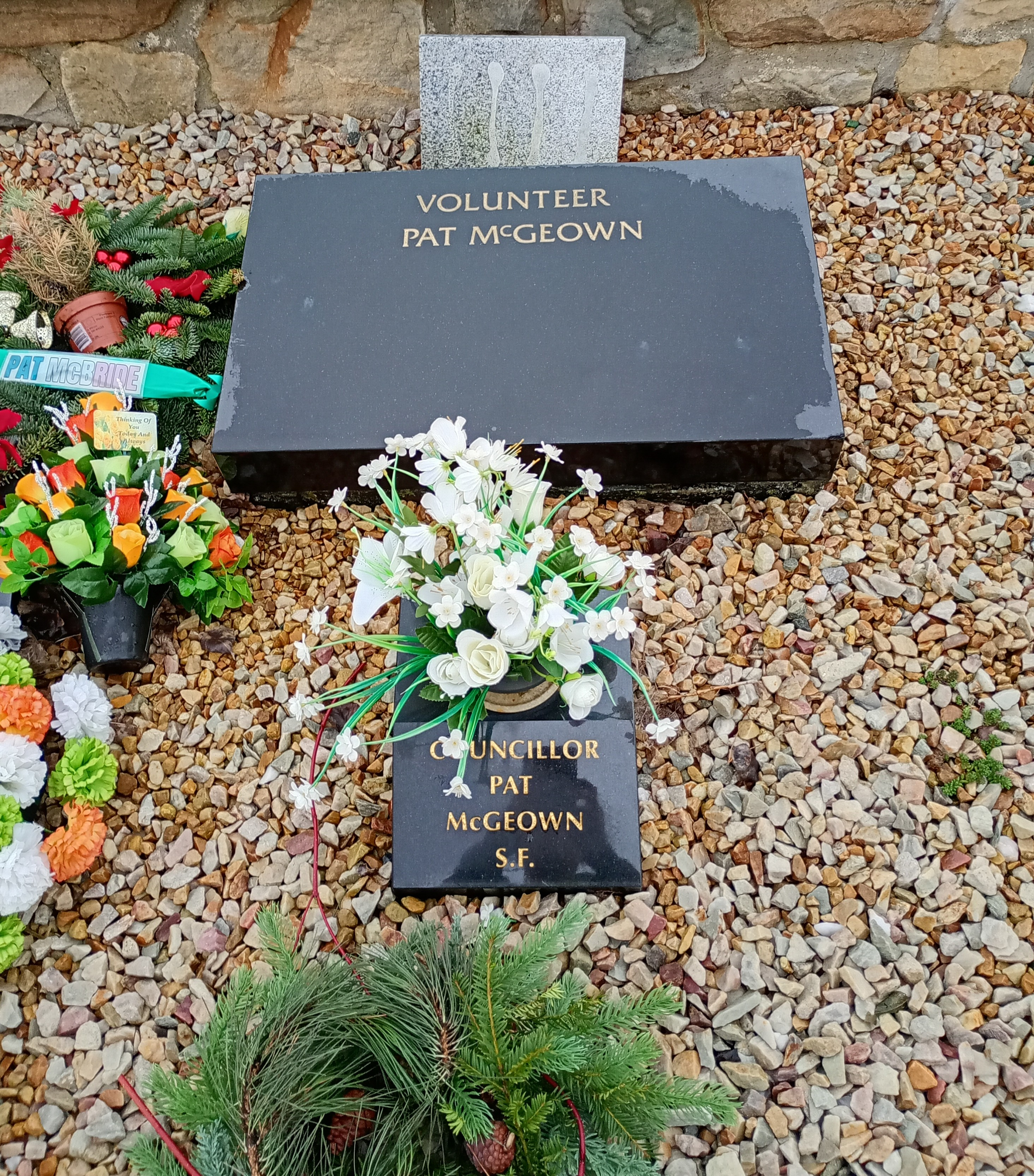
McGeown's grave in Milltown Cemetery, Belfast

McGeown was found dead in his home on 1 October 1996, after suffering a heart attack. Sinn Féin chairman Mitchel McLaughlin said his death was "a great loss to Sinn Féin and the republican struggle". McGeown was buried in the Republican plot at Belfast's Milltown Cemetery, and since his death is often referred to as the "11th hunger striker". In 1998 the Pat McGeown Community Endeavour Award was launched by Sinn Féin president Gerry Adams, with Adams describing McGeown as "a modest man with a quiet, but total dedication to equality and raising the standard of life for all the people of the city". A plaque in memory of McGeown was unveiled outside the Sinn Féin headquarters on the Falls Road on 24 November 2001, and a memorial plot on Beechmount Avenue was dedicated to the memory of McGeown, Kieran Nugent and Alec Comerford on 3 March 2002.
