= John Bingham (loyalist) =

Northern Irish loyalist (c. 1953–1986)

- Bingham in 1984
- Born: John Dowey Bingham c. 1953; Northern Ireland
- Died: 14 September 1986 (aged 33); Ballysillan, Belfast, Northern Ireland
- Military career
- Paramilitary: Ulster Volunteer Force
- Rank: Lieutenant colonel
- Units: D Company, 1st Battalion, Ballysillan
- Conflict: The Troubles

John Dowey Bingham (c. 1953 – 14 September 1986) was a prominent Northern Irish loyalist who led "D Company" (Ballysillan), 1st Battalion, Ulster Volunteer Force (UVF). He was shot dead by the Provisional IRA after they had broken into his home. Bingham was one of a number of prominent UVF members to be assassinated during the 1980s, the others being Lenny Murphy, William "Frenchie" Marchant, Robert Seymour and Jackie Irvine.

== Ulster Volunteer Force ==
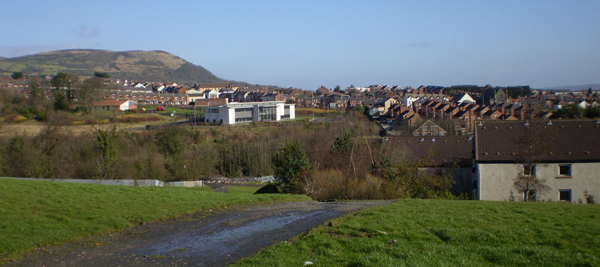
Ballysillan, north Belfast, where John Bingham lived and commanded the Ballysillan UVF

John Bingham was born in Northern Ireland around 1953 and was brought up in a Protestant family. Described as a shopkeeper, he was married with two children. He lived in Ballysillan Crescent, in the unionist estate of Ballysillan in North Belfast, and also owned a holiday caravan home in Millisle, County Down.

He was a member of the "Old Boyne Island Heroes" Lodge of the Orange Order. On an unknown date, he joined the Ulster loyalist paramilitary organisation, the UVF, and eventually became the commander of its "D Company", 1st Battalion, Ballysillan, with the rank of lieutenant-colonel. He was the mastermind behind a productive gun-running operation from Canada, which over the years had involved the smuggling of illegal weapons into Northern Ireland to supply UVF arsenals; however, three months after Bingham's death, the entire operation collapsed following a raid on a house in Toronto by the Royal Canadian Mounted Police in December 1986.

Bingham was one of the loyalist paramilitaries named in the evidence given by supergrass Joe Bennett, who accused him of being a UVF commander. He testified that he had seen Bingham armed with an M60 machine gun and claimed that Bingham had been sent to Toronto to raise funds for the UVF. These meetings opened contact with Canadian businessman John Taylor, who became involved in smuggling guns from North America to the UVF. As a result of Bennett's testimony, Bingham was sentenced to 20 years imprisonment after being convicted of committing serious crimes. He publicly denounced the supergrass system before live television cameras outside Belfast's Crumlin Road Courthouse when he was released in December 1984 after his conviction had been overturned, having spent two and a half years in prison.

On one occasion, Bingham allegedly placed a loaded pistol inside journalist Martin Dillon's mouth because of the latter's offensive words he had used against him. In an attempt to make amends for his threat, Bingham invited Dillon to visit him at his home in North Belfast. Dillon accepted the invitation and after several whiskeys and brandishing a pistol, Bingham offered to show him his racing pigeons as he was an avid pigeon fancier. He then told Dillon that he should not believe what people said about him claiming that he could not harm a pigeon. As they said farewell at the front door, Bingham reportedly murmured in a cold voice to Dillon: "You ever write about me again and I'll blow yer fuckin' brains out, because you're not a pigeon".

== Assassination ==
In July 1986, a 25-year-old Catholic civilian, Colm McCallan, was shot close to his Ligoniel home; two days later, he died of his wounds. The IRA sought to avenge McCallan's death by killing Bingham, the man they held responsible for the shooting. Bingham was also believed to have been behind the deaths of several other Catholic civilians.

At 1.30 am on 14 September 1986, Bingham was at home with his wife and child. Three gunmen from the Provisional IRA's Ardoyne-based 3rd Battalion, Belfast Brigade, armed with two automatic rifles and a .38 Special, smashed down his front door with a sledgehammer and shot Bingham twice in the legs. Despite his injuries, Bingham ran up the stairs in an attempt to escape his attackers and had just reached a secret door at the top when the gunmen shot him three more times, killing him. An entirely different version of events, after the demolition of the front door, was provided by the Republican newspaper, Republican News: two of the three intruders ran up the stairs, destroyed the locked security screen with gunfire, searched each upstairs room and found their victim hiding in the dark. He was then shot at least eleven times with a rifle and pistol.

Bingham was 33 years old. He was given a UVF paramilitary funeral, which was attended by politicians from the two main unionist parties, the Ulster Unionist Party and the Democratic Unionist Party (DUP). Members of his "Old Boyne Island Heroes" Orange Order Lodge formed the guard of honour around his coffin, which was covered with the UVF flag and his gloves and beret. Prominent DUP activist George Seawright helped carry the coffin whilst wearing his sash, and called for revenge.

In retaliation, the UVF killed Larry Marley, a leading Provisional IRA member from Ardoyne who was also a close friend of Sinn Féin president Gerry Adams. The IRA in their turn gunned down William "Frenchie" Marchant the following spring on the Shankill Road. The deaths of three leading UVF members caused suspicion amongst the UVF leadership that someone within their ranks was setting up high-ranking UVF men by passing on pertinent information to the Provisional IRA; therefore, they decided to conduct an enquiry. Although it was revealed that the three men, Shankill Butcher Lenny Murphy, Bingham, and Marchant had all quarrelled with powerful UDA fund-raiser and racketeer James Pratt Craig prior to their deaths, the UVF did not believe the evidence was sufficient to warrant an attack against Craig, who ran a large protection racket in Belfast. Craig was later shot to death in an East Belfast pub by the UDA (using their "Ulster Freedom Fighters" covername) for "treason", claiming he had been involved in the assassination of UDA's South Belfast Brigadier John McMichael, who was blown up by a booby-trap car bomb planted by the IRA outside his Lisburn home in December 1987.

On the Ballysillan Road, there is a memorial plaque dedicated to the memory of Bingham. His name was also on the banner of the "Old Boyne Island Heroes" Lodge.
