= William Marchant (loyalist) =

Northern Irish loyalist (c. 1948–1987)

- Marchant outside Crumlin Road Courthouse
- Born: c. 1948; Belfast, County Antrim, Northern Ireland
- Died: 28 April 1987 (aged 38–39); Shankill Road, Belfast
- Military career
- Allegiance: Ulster Volunteer Force
- Rank: Major
- Nickname: "Frenchie"
- Units: A Company, 1st Battalion Belfast Brigade
- Conflict: The Troubles

William "Frenchie" Marchant (c. 1948 – 28 April 1987) was a Northern Irish loyalist from the Shankill Road, Belfast, and a middle-ranking officer in the Ulster Volunteer Force (UVF). He was on a Garda list of suspects in the 1974 Dublin car bombings and allegedly the leader of the Belfast UVF unit known as "Freddie and the Dreamers" which hijacked and stole the three cars used in the bombings.

Nine days after the bombings he was arrested and interned at the Maze Prison in relation to the bombings. When questioned by detectives regarding the latter he refused to answer questions. He was never brought to trial due to lack of evidence. Marchant held the rank of major in the UVF's A Company, 1st Battalion, Belfast Brigade. In April 1987, he was shot by the Provisional IRA from a passing car as he stood on the Shankill and died in hospital.

== Dublin car bombings ==
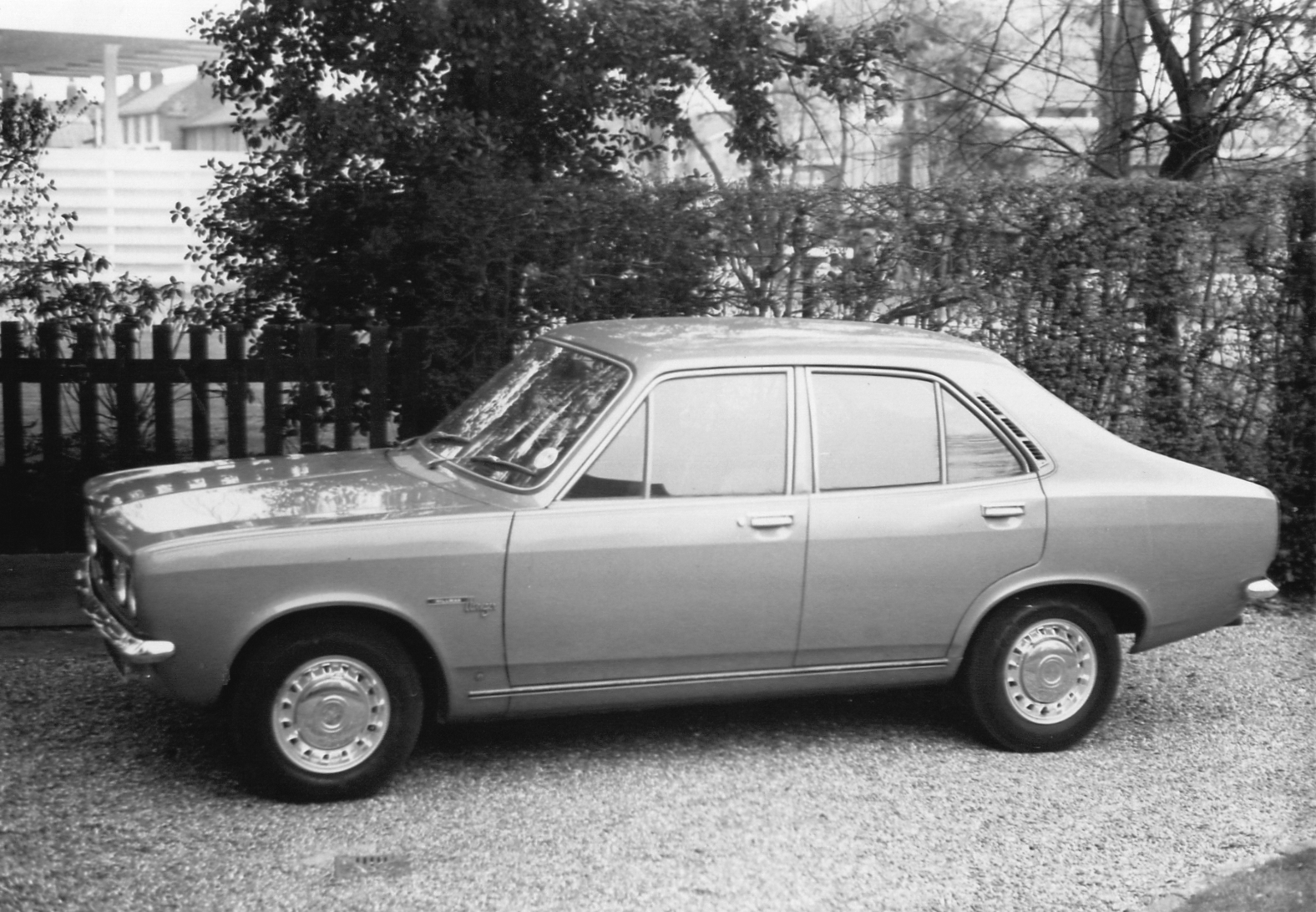
A green 1970 model Hillman Avenger was one of the hijacked cars used in the Dublin bombings. It exploded in Parnell Street, killing 10 people

Marchant was born in Belfast, Northern Ireland in about 1948. He grew up in the Ulster loyalist Shankill Road neighbourhood and was brought up as a Protestant. Some time prior to 1974, he joined the Ulster Volunteer Force (UVF), an illegal loyalist paramilitary organisation. He held the rank of major in its A Company, 1st Battalion Belfast Brigade. Marchant's nickname was "Frenchie".

Two units from the UVF's Belfast and Mid-Ulster Brigades exploded three no-warning car bombs in Dublin's city centre on 17 May 1974, the third day of the Ulster Workers Council Strike. This was a general strike in Northern Ireland called by hard-line unionists, who opposed the Sunningdale Agreement and the Northern Ireland Assembly which had proposed their sharing political power with nationalists and planned a role for the Republic of Ireland in the governance of Northern Ireland. The explosions occurred almost simultaneously during evening rush hour resulting in the deaths of 26 people, mostly young women; close to 300 people were injured, many maimed and scarred for life. According to former British soldier and psychological warfare operative Colin Wallace, the bombings had been organised by Billy Hanna, the Mid-Ulster Brigade's commander at the time.

The three cars used in the attacks had been stolen and hijacked that morning in Belfast by a UVF unit known as "Freddie and the Dreamers" (named after the 1960s English pop group) allegedly led by Marchant, and then, according to the 1993 Yorkshire Television documentary The Hidden Hand: The Forgotten Massacre, driven to a farm in Glenanne, County Armagh. This farm, which had been used to make and store the bombs, was owned by Royal Ulster Constabulary (RUC) reservist James Mitchell of the Glenanne gang. After the cars were delivered to the waiting bomb unit, the latter drove them across the border down to the Coachman's Inn pub carpark. Journalist Joe Tiernan suggested that the cars were driven directly to the North Dublin carpark, with only one stop in Portadown by one of the cars to collect David Alexander Mulholland, one of the alleged bombers. It was at the carpark that the three bombs, which had been transported in a chicken lorry by senior Mid-Ulster UVF member Robin "the Jackal" Jackson, were placed inside the boots of the cars by Hanna and Jackson. The cars – a metallic green 1970 model Hillman Avenger and blue Austin 1800 Maxi – that ended up in Parnell Street and South Leinster Street had been hijacked while the metallic blue mink Ford Escort which detonated in Talbot Street had been stolen from Belfast's docks area. All three cars had retained their original registration numbers. The Hidden Hand: The Forgotten Massacre named Marchant as having been on a Garda Síochána list of suspects as the leader of the gang which obtained the bomb cars.

Ninety minutes after the Dublin explosions, another car bomb exploded in Monaghan, causing a further seven deaths. A detective from Dublin's Store Street Garda Station received confidential information that Marchant had masterminded both the Dublin and Monaghan attacks. On 26 May, he was arrested by the Northern Ireland security forces under the Northern Ireland (Emergency Provision) Act 1974 and interned at the Maze Prison on an Interim Custody Order partly on suspicion of having participated in the car bombings. He was interrogated by detectives but refused to reply to any questions relating to the Dublin bombings. Marchant and the others who had also been interned as suspects in the attacks, were never brought to trial due to lack of evidence. The RUC Special Branch, in a reply dated 23 July 1974 to an earlier Garda enquiry regarding Marchant, stated that Marchant "was our guest for a number of hours (and CID) but with negative result".

The Barron Report which was the findings of the official investigation into the car bombings commissioned by Irish Supreme Court Justice Henry Barron confirmed that Marchant was named in the Garda files as the leader of the gang which provided the bomb cars. Colin Wallace briefed the media without attribution, identifying Marchant as the person responsible for the car hijackings and theft, based on his own information. In a written statement to Justice For the Forgotten (an organisation of victims and relatives seeking justice for the Dublin and Monaghan bombings), Wallace maintained that Marchant was "identified to [British] Army Intelligence as a Special Branch source being run by a named officer". When queried by the organisation's legal team, Wallace qualified the statement by adding:

That's right, that was my belief … there were a number of Special Branch people who at this time appeared to have very close links with various loyalist groups. I'm not saying for good or ill, but certainly had close links with key loyalists. Marchant may well have been an informant, but I don't know.

Many years later, journalist Peter Taylor questioned Progressive Unionist Party politician and former senior Belfast UVF member David Ervine about UVF motives for bombing Dublin in 1974. He replied they [UVF] were "returning the serve". Although Ervine said he had nothing to do with the bombings, he said they were carried out to make Catholics in the Republic suffer as Protestants in Northern Ireland had been suffering as the result of the IRA bombing campaign. As of 2026, nobody has ever been convicted of the Dublin and Monaghan bombings.

== Supergrass trials ==
In the mid-1980s Marchant was one of a number of leading UVF figures arrested on the evidence of William "Budgie" Allen, a UVF member who turned supergrass and provided evidence on the activities of a number of his fellow members. Initially held in 1983, Marchant was granted bail to marry although he failed to return and was eventually rearrested after a high-speed pursuit through the Shankill Road.

Based on Allen's evidence Marchant faced a number of charges, including the attempted murder of a member of Gerry Adams' family. However, although he was held in custody for eighteen months, Marchant was released from prison in 1985 after the Allen trial collapsed. Although he had appeared before Belfast's Crumlin Road Crown Court, the case against him and the others had collapsed when the judge decided Allen's evidence was ""totally unreliable". Allen was declared persona non grata by the UVF, who announced that he would be killed if he left his hiding place in England, although Marchant surprisingly announced that he personally forgave Allen. In 1984 Marchant, along with fellow UVF man John Bingham, was part of a group led by Loyalist politician George Seawright that wielded legally-held handguns to physically remove an Irish tricolour that had been erected at Whiterock Leisure Centre.

== Killing ==
Marchant was shot dead by IRA gunmen from a passing car as he stood outside "The Eagle" chip shop on the crowded Shankill Road on 28 April 1987. The UVF Brigade Staff had their headquarters in the rooms above the shop. The shooting took place close to the offices of the Progressive Unionist Party (PUP). Marchant's fatal shooting was in retaliation for the UVF's killing of Larry Marley, a close friend of Sinn Féin President Gerry Adams and a senior IRA member from Ardoyne, less than a month before. The IRA claimed that Marchant had been directly involved in the killing of Marley. On 1 May 1987, Marchant was given a full UVF paramilitary funeral. The address given at his funeral service, which denounced all paramilitary organisations and their acts of violence, was afterwards praised by Roman Catholic bishop Cahal Daly. Marchant's widow later gave her permission for their son to go to the US for an ecumenical student exchange visit.

George Seawright, a member of Belfast City Council who also maintained clandestine UVF membership, stated in the aftermath of Marchant's shooting that he had "no hesitation in calling for revenge and retribution". Several months after Marchant's shooting, the UVF sought to avenge his death with an attempt on the life of Anthony "Booster" Hughes, a suspected IRA man from Ardoyne.

According to author and journalist Martin Dillon, Marchant's daily movements leading up to his death had been unpredictable and erratic; this indicated the possibility that just before his shooting someone had alerted the IRA by telephone, advising them of Marchant's presence on the Shankill Road. The IRA would normally have kept a hit squad on standby in a neighbourhood close to where their intended target was likely to be. Marchant's killing was the third assassination carried out in the 1980s by the IRA against senior UVF members. The UVF conducted an internal inquiry in an attempt to establish whether someone within the organisation had supplied information to the IRA which had led to the killings of Marchant and the other two: Lenny Murphy and John Bingham. Although the inquiry revealed that Marchant – as well as Murphy and Bingham – had quarrelled with powerful West Belfast UDA fund-raiser James Pratt Craig before their deaths, the UVF Brigade Staff did not consider the evidence sufficient to warrant an attack against Craig, who ran a large protection racket.

Marchant had been due to meet Craig outside "The Eagle" before he was shot dead. Instead of getting out of the car at the chip shop where Marchant waited, Craig got out at the Inter-City furniture shop on the corner of Conway Street. There he engaged in conversation with another person for five minutes. Within the five minutes, Marchant was gunned down just 50 yards away. In October 1988, Craig was shot dead in an East Belfast pub by the UDA (using their cover name Ulster Freedom Fighters) for "treason", claiming that he had been involved in the death of UDA leader John McMichael, who was blown up the previous December in a booby-trap car bomb planted by the IRA.

In his book The Red Hand, Professor Steve Bruce disputes the claim that Craig was involved in Marchant's death and quotes another (anonymous) UVF member who stated that Marchant was "like a bloody cigar store Indian", spending long periods standing outside the PUP headquarters talking to various people. The claim that Marchant was set up by Craig was repeated in 2025.

At the junction of Spier's Place and the Shankill Road, there is a mural and memorial plaque commemorating Marchant.

== Bibliography ==
- Taylor, Peter (1999). Loyalists. London: Bloomsbury Publishing Plc.; ISBN 978-0-7475-4519-4
- Dillon, Martin (1989). The Shankill Butchers: the real story of cold-blooded mass murder. New York: Routledge
- Tiernan, Joe (2000). The Dublin Bombings and the Murder Triangle. Ireland: Mercier Press
