= Larry Marley =

Member of the Provisional Irish Republican Army

- Born: Laurence Marley; 24 July 1945; Belfast, Northern Ireland
- Died: 2 April 1987 (aged 41); Ardoyne, Northern Ireland
- Burial place: Milltown Cemetery, West Belfast
- Military career
- Allegiance: Provisional Irish Republican Army
- Unit: Belfast Brigade
- Conflict: The Troubles

Laurence Marley (24 July 1945 – 2 April 1987) was a Provisional Irish Republican Army (IRA) member from Ardoyne, Belfast, Northern Ireland. He was one of the masterminds behind the 1983 mass escape of republican prisoners from the Maze Prison, where Marley was imprisoned at the time, although he did not participate in the break-out. Marley was described by British journalist Peter Taylor as having been a close friend of Sinn Féin president Gerry Adams. Marley was shot dead by an Ulster Volunteer Force (UVF) unit two years after his release from the Maze. His shooting was in retaliation for the killing of leading UVF member John Bingham the previous September by the Ardoyne IRA.

== IRA ==
Lawrence Marley was born in Belfast on 24 July 1945 and was raised a Roman Catholic. He grew up in the Ardoyne area in the north of the city and attended Holy Cross Boy's Primary and St. Gabriel's Secondary schools. He became involved with the IRA in the early stages of the Troubles, and was a member of an active service unit in the Provisional IRA Belfast Brigade until his arrest in late 1972. At the time he was married to Kate and the father of three sons. He was sent to Long Kesh (Maze Prison). In March 1975, he, along with nine other IRA men, escaped from Newry courthouse, where he was on trial for an attempted escape from Long Kesh. He went on the run but was recaptured in Belfast in 1977. Charged with possession of weapons, Marley was sentenced to another 10 years in Long Kesh.

Together with Brendan McFarlane and Pat McGeown, he made an attempt to escape in 1978 dressed as a prison warden, but they were caught before they reached the prison perimeter. That plan having failed to come to fruition, he joined the blanket protest in the Maze's H-Blocks for four years. In September 1983, he helped Brendan McFarlane, Bobby Storey and Gerry Kelly to orchestrate the successful mass escape of 38 republican prisoners from the Maze. It was the largest prison escape in British penal history. According to a BBC documentary about the escape, Marley was the mastermind, having come up with the idea with the aim of embarrassing British Prime Minister Margaret Thatcher, as the Maze was considered to be one of the world's most secure prisons. Marley, unlike his three co-conspirators, did not take part in the break-out as his release date was coming up.

Marley was released from prison in November 1986 and returned to his home in Ardoyne. Because of his major role in masterminding the prison escape, Marley became a hate figure for the British military in Northern Ireland and the Royal Ulster Constabulary.

== Death ==
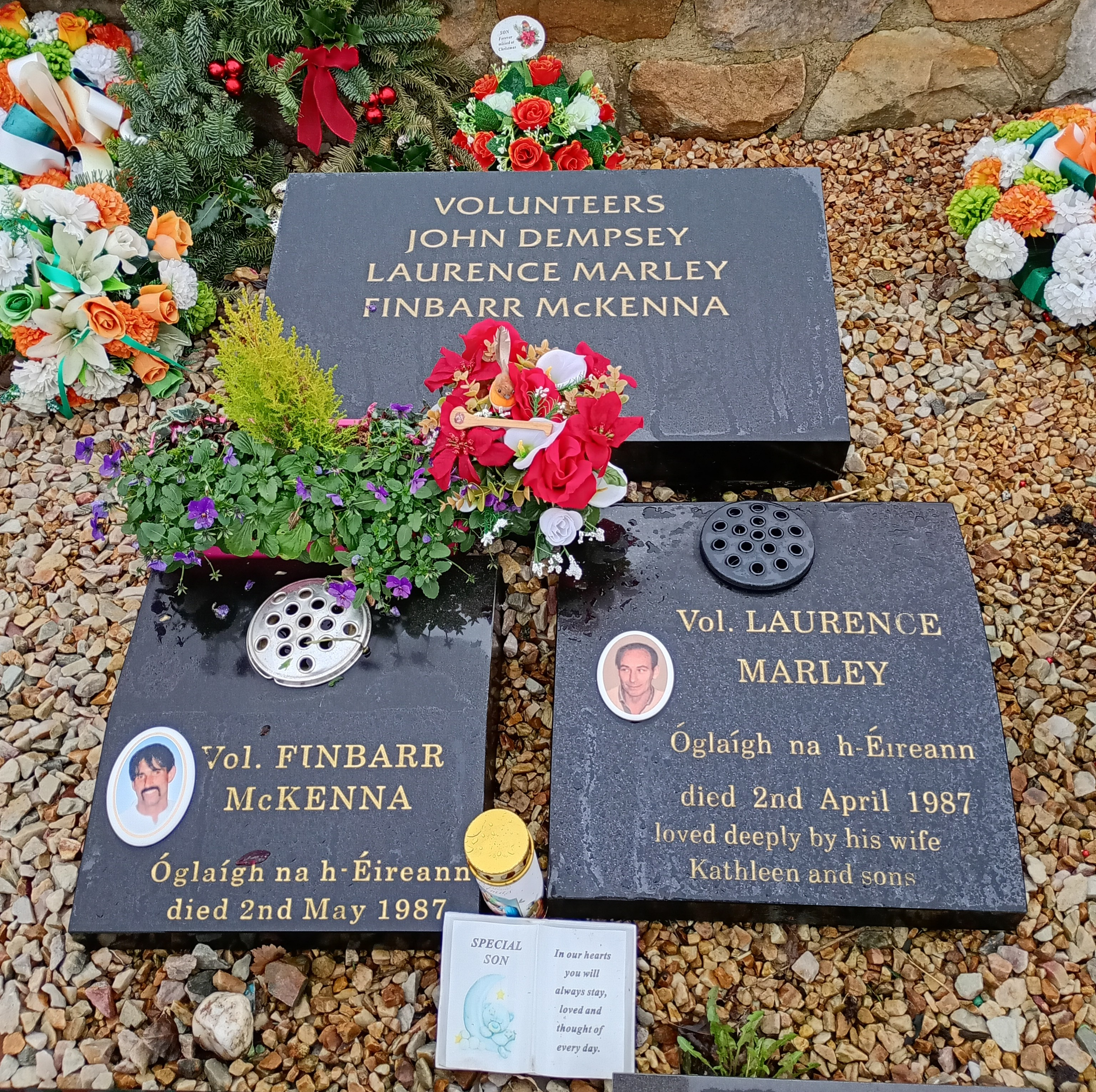
Marley's grave in Milltown Cemetery, Belfast

Lawrence Marley was fatally shot shortly after 9.00 p.m. on 2 April 1987 by an Ulster Volunteer Force (UVF) unit that drove up to his home in Ardoyne. Two gunmen got out of the car; one was armed with a Browning pistol and his companion carried an automatic shotgun. The men knocked at the front door, and just as Marley arrived to open it, they began firing at him through the door. He was mortally wounded and died of his injuries ninety minutes later in hospital. He was 41 years old at the time of his death and had six sons, the youngest aged two weeks. According to journalist Peter Taylor, he was a close friend of Sinn Féin president Gerry Adams, the two men having met in prison. The shooting was in retaliation for the Ardoyne IRA's killing of leading UVF member John Bingham the previous September.

The UVF released a statement afterwards regarding the shooting:

Laurence Marley had served a long prison sentence for IRA activities including blackmail and possession of arms and explosives. Upon his release, he became re-involved with the organisation and this re-involvement cost him his life

Marley's funeral was delayed for three days as the RUC refused to allow military displays at the graveside and formed a heavily armed cordon around his Ardoyne home. There was intense rioting in north and west Belfast due to the delay. Finally, the police compromised and the funeral took place with thousands of mourners following the cortege, which was preceded by 35 armoured RUC Land Rovers, to the Republican Plot in the Milltown Cemetery. According to Gerry Adams, Marley's funeral witnessed the largest "display of Republican support since the hunger strikes" in 1981. Marley was described as having been determined, unselfish, possessed of a resourceful intelligence and a readiness to help his friends and fellow volunteers.

== Aftermath ==
The IRA avenged Marley's death at the end of the month by shooting dead William "Frenchie" Marchant in the loyalist stronghold of the Shankill Road from a passing car as Marchant stood outside the Progressive Unionist Party (PUP) offices. Marchant, who held the rank of major in the UVF, was implicated in the 1974 Dublin car bombings.

UVF member Gerry Spence was one of the men later charged with Marley's killing; but when he was brought to trial in April 1988, he was acquitted of Marley's murder.

There is a memorial plaque commemorating Marley in Ardoyne Avenue, close to its junction with Havana Gardens.

== Cultural references ==
In the 2017 film Maze dramatising the 1983 prison break, directed by Stephen Burke, Marley was portrayed by Tom Vaughan-Lawlor.
