= John Graham (loyalist) =

Northern Irish loyalist

- Born: 1945 (age 79–80); Lower Shankill, Belfast, Northern Ireland
- Paramilitary: Ulster Volunteer Force
- Rank: Chief-of-Staff; Brigadier-general
- Conflict: The Troubles; 2000 UDA-UVF Feud

John "Bunter" Graham (born c. 1945) is a long-standing prominent Ulster loyalist figure. Born in the Lower Shankill, Graham rose quickly through the ranks of the Ulster Volunteer Force (UVF), joining other UVF leaders at a rally at Stormont in 1974 to celebrate the collapse of power sharing. (Note: Graham is pictured in the third image, two rows behind and to the right of Rev. Ian Paisley (front centre, as the viewer looks). A sandy-haired man wearing a turtle-neck sweater, Graham is standing to the right of Rev. Robert Bradford and looking down and slightly to his left.)

He became a member of the UVF's "Brigade Staff" (Belfast leadership) and, allegedly, chief of staff in 1976. In the late 1970s, he was admitted to the Mater Hospital for a short stay. Although he was watched by bodyguards, the Provisional IRA decided to assassinate him, in what they termed "Operation Bunter". However, this was prevented by the police, acting on information received from an informant.

In 1983, Joseph Bennett, a UVF commander, became an informant for the Royal Ulster Constabulary (RUC). As a result, fourteen prominent members of the UVF were imprisoned, including Graham.

Graham was targeted for assassination by the Irish People's Liberation Organisation (IPLO) and on 10 October 1991 an IPLO unit entered the Diamond Jubilee bar on Graham's native Shankill Road and shot a patron dead. However the man they killed was Harry Ward, a 42-year-old Protestant Ulster Defence Association (UDA) member whom they mistook for Graham. On 14 January 1993, Graham was hit and critically injured by rifle shots, fired through the window of his home. The Irish National Liberation Army (INLA) claimed responsibility. The attack led to a number of other leading loyalists turning their homes into miniature fortresses for fear that they too would be targeted.

Graham has been named on several occasions as the incumbent UVF Chief of Staff, and as such holding brigadier-general rank: for example, by Pat Rabbitte, and by campaigner Raymond McCord. Investigative journalist and author Martin Dillon uses the pseudonym "Mr F." to refer to a "military commander" in the UVF, whom he states was "known as Bunter".

Ed Moloney in his book Voices From the Grave: Two Men's War in Ireland stated that he has held the position of UVF Chief of Staff since 1976. Raymond McCord claimed, in a statement to the United States House Committee on Foreign Affairs, that Graham had acted as an "agent of the state".

In 2000, amid a violent UDA-UVF feud, Graham was involved in talking to hardliners in the UVF and dissuading them from escalating the conflict. Under Graham's influence the UVF members who were feuding with the UDA West Belfast Brigade agreed to a truce negotiated by the group's political representatives David Ervine of the UVF-linked Progressive Unionist Party and Gary McMichael of the UDA's political arm, the Ulster Democratic Party.

In 2012, Graham went on a trip with other veteran loyalists and republicans to the Middle East to study the Arab-Israeli conflict and the lessons it might provide for Northern Ireland.
