= Raymond McCord =

Victims' rights campaigner from Northern Ireland

- Born: Raymond Irvine McCord; 23 December 1953 (age 72); York Road, Belfast, Northern Ireland
- Education: Belfast High School
- Occupation: Welder
- Employer: Harland & Wolff
- Known for: Activist
- Political party: Independent
- Spouse: Vivenne McCord
- Children: Raymond, Gareth and Glenn McCord
- Parent(s): Hector and Kathleen McCord

Raymond Irvine McCord (born 23 December 1953) is a victim's rights campaigner from Northern Ireland. McCord became involved in the issue of victims rights after his son, Raymond McCord Jr., was killed by the loyalist paramilitary group the Ulster Volunteer Force (UVF) in 1997. He is an outspoken critic of the UVF.

== Background ==
McCord, an Ulster Protestant, was born in the unionist York Road area of North Belfast. His family lived at 17 Grove Street until he was two when they moved to a new house in the recently built Rathcoole estate in Newtownabbey. As a youth McCord was educated first at Whitehouse Primary School and subsequently at Belfast High School.

During his teenage years he played in an association football team Star of the Sea alongside future Provisional IRA member and hunger striker Bobby Sands. Although the club was nominally Catholic it also had many Protestant youths. Two of McCord's other teammates, Terry Nicholl and Michael Acheson, would both later join the Ulster Volunteer Force (UVF) and serve time in prison for offences related to their membership.

Most of the Protestant players left after the outbreak of the Troubles, although McCord remained and played for the senior side in the Northern Amateur Football League, alongside Marty Quinn. As a 17-year-old he had trials with Manchester United F.C., a club he continues to support, and Blackpool F.C., but was not offered terms by either club and did not pursue a career in football.

McCord had worked as a welder at Harland & Wolff and as a bouncer. In 1992 as a result of a dispute with the loyalist paramilitary group the Ulster Defence Association (UDA) he received a vicious beating from six UDA members in Rathcoole. He left Northern Ireland some time after to go to the US, returning in 1995. Upon his return he attempted to address the intimidation of his wife Vivienne and their three children: Raymond, Gareth and Glenn, by the UDA. According to McCord his two youngest sons, who lived with their mother in Rathfern whilst Raymond Jnr. lived with him, were frequent victims of gang attacks from local UDA members. McCord's dispute with the UDA was linked to an incident with prominent UDA member John Gregg.

== Killing of Raymond McCord Jnr ==
Raymond junior, the oldest of McCord's three sons, was born on 24 November 1974. He joined the Royal Air Force (RAF) in his teens, serving as a radar operator. He left the RAF after four years and returned home to Northern Ireland, where he joined the UVF. McCord senior believed this was to offer his family protection from the Ulster Defence Association (UDA) due to the McCord family's previous trouble with the UDA.

McCord junior was attached to the Mount Vernon unit of the UVF and was under the command of Mark Haddock. Mostly involved in drug running operations, McCord junior was caught with a haul of cannabis and arrested. Fearing a rebuke from the UVF Brigade Staff (Belfast leadership) from McCord junior informing the police and the UVF leadership about Haddock's involvement in the drug trade, Haddock allegedly decided to have McCord junior killed. On 9 November 1997 the latter was believed to have been lured from home and taken to a disused quarry in Ballyduff, Newtownabbey where he was beaten to death with concrete blocks. He was 22 at the time of his death. He was buried in Carnmoney Cemetery in Newtownabbey on 14 November 1997.

McCord senior initially believed his son had been killed by the UDA as part of the bad blood between that organisation and his family but later had it confirmed by several sources that the UVF had been behind the killing. The UDA South East Antrim Brigade issued a statement acknowledging the history it had with McCord but denied any involvement in his son's death.

== Campaigning ==
Angered by the lack of interest by mainstream Unionism and the police investigation McCord carried out his own investigation. Promising to his family to act within the law he used his contacts with loyalism to uncover that Mark Haddock was a police informer. McCord claims he met with UVF Chief of Staff John "Bunter" Graham and other leading members of the organisation in the Maze prison, where they were waiting to visit an inmate, soon after his son's killing and that they agreed to conduct the internal investigation that uncovered the information about Haddock. However he further claimed that the inquiry did not target Haddock as some of those involved in it were themselves police informers. McCord discovered that Haddock's status as an informer meant he wasn't questioned or linked to the killing of his son. Telling anyone who would listen to his claims McCord make a decisive breakthrough in 2002 when he met Police Ombudsman Nuala O'Loan. O'Loan conducted an investigation and the results were published in 2007. The investigation was named Operation Ballast, and focused on alleged collusion between the Royal Ulster Constabulary (RUC) and the UVF. The report stated the police colluded with loyalists in over a dozen murders in North Belfast. O'Loan had established that a leading loyalist who was also a police informer had been involved in the killing and in 2005 it was announced in the Dáil by Irish Labour Party leader Pat Rabbitte using parliamentary privilege that the loyalist in question was Mark Haddock.

After being dismayed by the reaction of unionist politicians McCord announced his intention to stand for election in the 2007 Northern Ireland assembly elections in his native North Belfast constituency. McCord stated that he took the decision after Jeffrey Donaldson condemned him in a television interview after the publication of the O'Loan Report, questioning why McCord did not report his son to the police for being a UVF member. McCord's manifesto was co-written by Mark Langhammer, with the two being old friends. He subsequently received 1320 votes (4.4% of the total vote). This was actually McCord's second election as he had also been a candidate in the 2003 election when he captured only 218 votes (0.7%).

In 2008 McCord made history by becoming the first Unionist to address the annual Sinn Féin Ard Fheis. Wearing his father's Orange Order sash at the event he denounced the Democratic Unionist Party (DUP) for ignoring evidence of collusion between the security forces and loyalist paramilitaries. Sinn Féin previously in 2007 had organised a trip for McCord to attend the European Parliament in Strasbourg to address a meeting of MEP's regarding the issue of collusion in Northern Ireland. McCord had also met Gerry Adams on the Falls Road around this time.

McCord was again an independent candidate for North Belfast in the 2011 assembly elections. This time he captured a reduced vote total of 1,176 for a 3.5% share. He was also an unsuccessful candidate for Belfast City Council in the concurrent local elections, running in the Court District Electoral Area.

In December 2013 McCord was with anti-drugs campaigner Tracey Coulter, daughter of Jackie Coulter when Mo Courtney, a leading figure in the UDA West Belfast Brigade and a strong opponent of Tracey Coulter, approached them and verbally abused them, allegedly threatening to kill both McCord and Coulter. Brought to trial for the incident, Courtney was found guilty with issuing the death threat to McCord (although not Coulter).

In November 2014 McCord announced his intention to stand for parliament in the 2015 general election. McCord declared that he would run against the DUP's Nigel Dodds in North Belfast, claiming that the DUP had "let victims down". Ultimately however he did not contest the election.

An opponent of plans for the UK to leave the European Union McCord, who argued that the move would jeopardise stability in Northern Ireland and hit funding for post-Troubles projects, launched a legal challenge against the proposed move in the aftermath of the referendum.

He announced his intention to vote for Nichola Mallon of the SDLP in the 2017 Assembly Elections. Despite his Unionist beliefs, he said that he believed Mallon was best placed to serve all the people of North Belfast, and criticised the DUP and Sinn Féin's divisive approach to politics. He also revealed plans to canvass for People Before Profit in Derry and spoke of his support for Eamonn McCann.

External videos
- McCord's Brexit battle, January 2017, Deutsche Welle

== Personal life ==
McCord was the second child of Hector and Kathleen McCord (née Elliott), his sister Jean being seven years older than him. McCord states that, whilst his father was a member of the Orange Order, the Apprentice Boys of Derry and the Royal Black Institution, he maintained close friendships with his Catholic neighbours in the New Lodge area and, before the advent of the Troubles, regularly drank in the pubs there. Hector McCord died in 1994 aged 70 whilst Kathleen McCord was still alive as of 2008.

McCord met his wife Vivienne, who also lived in Rathcoole, when he was 15. They married in 1973 and set up home in a flat in Rathcoole. The family moved to nearby Rathfern around 1976 and their second son Gareth was born there in 1977. A third son Glenn followed soon afterwards. McCord and his wife split in the 1980s and he returned to live in Rathcoole. He subsequently moved back to York Road.

In 2014 McCord was convicted of benefit fraud, pleading guilty to thirteen counts totalling £69,000 in mis-claimed housing benefit, incapacity benefit and industrial injury reduced earnings allowances. He was given a sentence of 18 months imprisonment, suspended for three years.
