= Ulster Volunteer Force =

Ulster loyalist paramilitary group

Ulster Volunteer Force (UVF)
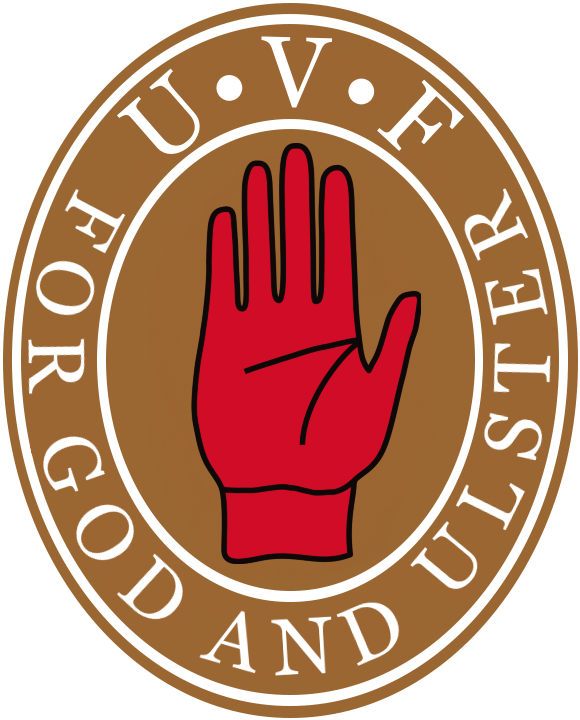
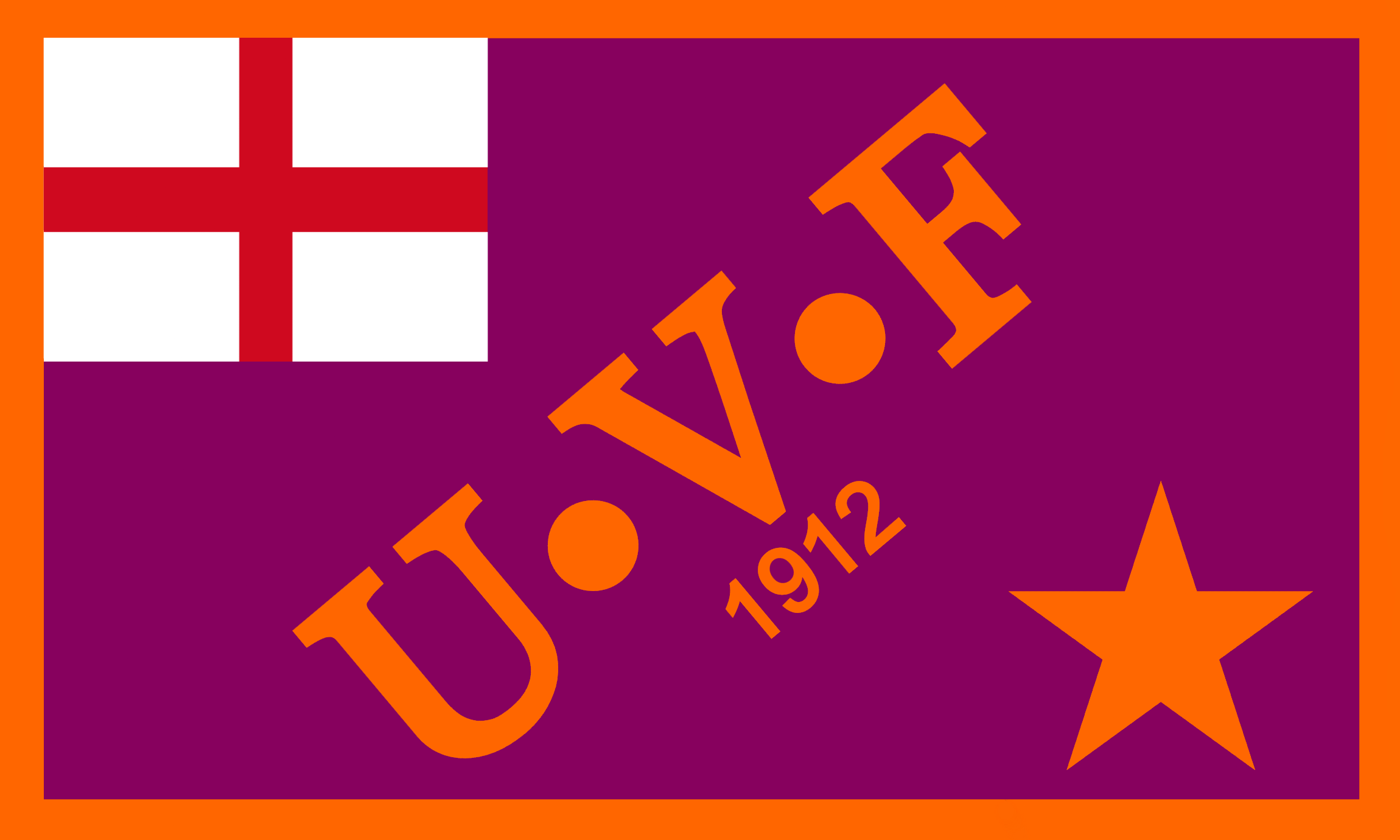
- Above: the UVF emblem, with the Red Hand of Ulster and the motto "For God and Ulster"; Below: the UVF flag (Note: The flag was never standardized; numerous variations of this flag exist.)
- Dates active: May 1966 – present (on ceasefire since October 1994; officially ended armed campaign in May 2007)
- Groups: Young Citizen Volunteers (youth wing); Protestant Action Force (cover name); Protestant Action Group (cover name); Progressive Unionist Party (political representation)
- Headquarters: Shankill Road, Belfast
- Active regions: Northern Ireland (mostly); Republic of Ireland; Scotland (fifteen operations)
- Ideology: Ulster loyalism; Irish unionism; Anti-Catholicism; Anti-Irish sentiment; Protestant extremism; Anti-immigration (post-Good Friday)
- Size: 1,500 at peak in the 1970s (hard core of 400–500 gunmen and bombers); Estimated several hundred members in active service units by 1990s; 300 (2010)
- Wars: The Troubles

The Ulster Volunteer Force (UVF) is an Ulster loyalist paramilitary group based in Northern Ireland. Formed in 1965, it first emerged in 1966. Its first leader was Gusty Spence, a Protestant former soldier in the Royal Ulster Rifles from Northern Ireland. The group undertook an armed campaign of almost thirty years during The Troubles, often coming into conflict with the Provisional Irish Republican Army and the Royal Ulster Constabulary. It declared a ceasefire in 1994 and officially ended its campaign in 2007, although some of its members have continued to engage in violence and criminal activities. The group is a proscribed organisation and is on the terrorist organisation list of the United Kingdom.

The UVF's declared goals were to combat Irish republican paramilitaries – particularly the IRA – and to maintain Northern Ireland's status as part of the United Kingdom. It was responsible for more than 500 deaths. The vast majority (more than two-thirds) of its victims were Irish Catholic civilians, who were often killed at random. During the conflict, its deadliest attack in Northern Ireland was the 1971 McGurk's Bar bombing, which killed fifteen civilians. The group also carried out attacks in the Republic of Ireland from 1969 onward. The biggest of these was the 1974 Dublin and Monaghan bombings, which killed 34 civilians, making it the deadliest terrorist attack of the conflict. The no-warning car bombings had been carried out by units from the Belfast and Mid-Ulster brigades.

The Mid-Ulster Brigade was also responsible for the 1975 Miami Showband killings, in which three members of the popular Irish cabaret band were shot dead at a bogus security checkpoint by gunmen wearing military uniforms. Two UVF men were accidentally blown up in this attack. The UVF's last major attack was the 1994 Loughinisland massacre, in which its members shot dead six Catholic civilians in a rural pub. The group was noted for secrecy and a policy of limited, selective membership.

Since the ceasefire, the UVF, especially the East Belfast UVF, has been involved in rioting, drug dealing, organised crime, loan-sharking and prostitution. Some members have also been found responsible for orchestrating a series of racist attacks.

== History ==
=== Background ===
Since 1964 and the formation of the Campaign for Social Justice, there had been a growing civil rights campaign in Northern Ireland, seeking to highlight discrimination against Catholics by the unionist government of Northern Ireland. Some unionists feared Irish nationalism and launched an opposing response in Northern Ireland. In April 1966, Ulster loyalists led by Ian Paisley, a Protestant fundamentalist preacher, founded the Ulster Constitution Defence Committee (UCDC). It set up a paramilitary-style wing called the Ulster Protestant Volunteers (UPV). The 'Paisleyites' set out to stymie the civil rights movement and oust Terence O'Neill, Prime Minister of Northern Ireland. Although O'Neill was a unionist, they saw him as being too 'soft' on the civil rights movement and too friendly with the Republic of Ireland. There was to be much overlap in membership between the UCDC/UPV and the UVF.

=== Beginnings ===
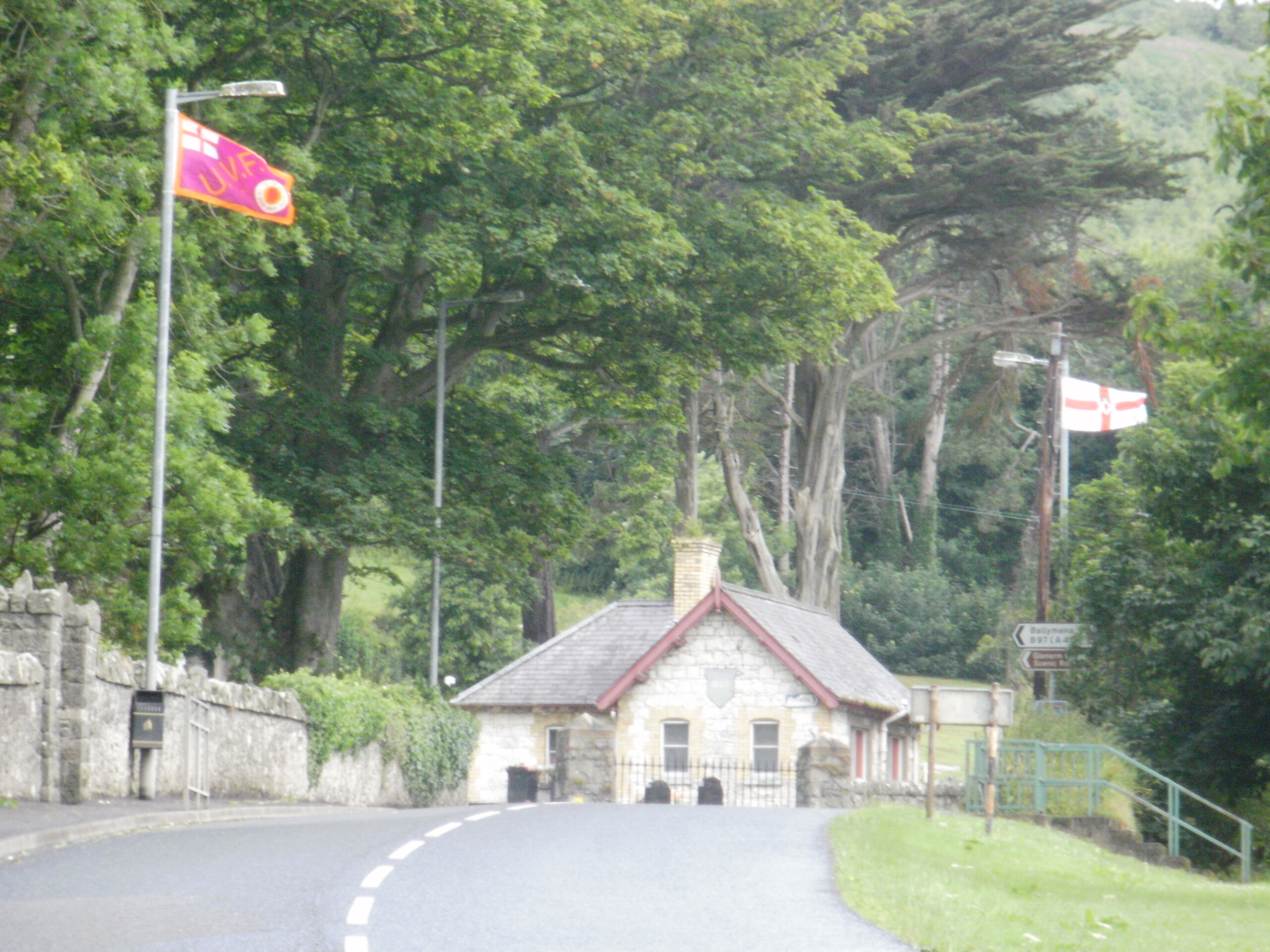
A UVF flag in Glenarm, County Antrim

On 7 May 1966, loyalists petrol bombed a Catholic-owned pub in the loyalist Shankill area of Belfast. Fire engulfed the house next door, badly burning the elderly Protestant widow who lived there. She died of her injuries on 27 June. The group called itself the "Ulster Volunteer Force" (UVF), after the Ulster Volunteers of the early 20th century, although in the words of a member of the previous organisation "the present para-military organisation ... has no connection with the U.V.F. of which I have been speaking. Though, for its own purposes, it assumed the same name it has nothing else in common." It was led by Gusty Spence, a former Royal Ulster Rifles soldier from Northern Ireland. Spence claimed that he was approached in 1965 by two men, one of whom was an Ulster Unionist Party MP, who told him that the UVF was to be re-established and that he was to have responsibility for the Shankill. On 21 May, the group issued a statement:

From this day, we declare war against the Irish Republican Army and its splinter groups. Known IRA men will be executed mercilessly and without hesitation. Less extreme measures will be taken against anyone sheltering or helping them, but if they persist in giving them aid, then more extreme methods will be adopted. ... we solemnly warn the authorities to make no more speeches of appeasement. We are heavily armed Protestants dedicated to this cause.

On 27 May, Spence sent four UVF members to kill IRA volunteer Leo Martin, who lived in Belfast. Unable to find their target, the men drove around the Falls district in search of a Catholic. They shot John Scullion, a Catholic civilian, as he walked home. He died of his wounds on 11 June. Spence later wrote "At the time, the attitude was that if you couldn't get an IRA man you should shoot a Taig, he's your last resort".

On 26 June, the group shot dead a Catholic civilian and wounded two others as they left a pub on Malvern Street, Belfast. Two days later, the Government of Northern Ireland declared the UVF illegal. The shootings led to Spence's being sentenced to life imprisonment with a recommended minimum sentence of twenty years. Spence appointed Samuel McClelland as UVF Chief of Staff in his stead.

=== Violence escalates ===
By 1969, the Catholic civil rights movement had escalated its protest campaign, and O'Neill had promised them some concessions. In March and April that year, UVF and UPV members bombed water and electricity installations in Northern Ireland, blaming them on the dormant IRA and elements of the civil rights movement. Some of them left much of Belfast without power and water. The loyalists "intended to force a crisis which would so undermine confidence in O'Neill's ability to maintain law and order that he would be obliged to resign". There were bombings on 30 March, 4 April, 20 April, 24 April and 26 April. All were widely blamed on the IRA, and British troops were sent to guard installations. Unionist support for O'Neill waned, and on 28 April he resigned as Prime Minister.

On 12 August 1969, the "Battle of the Bogside" began in Derry. This was a large, three-day riot between Irish nationalists and the Royal Ulster Constabulary (RUC). In response to events in Derry, nationalists held protests throughout Northern Ireland, some of which became violent. In Belfast, loyalists responded by attacking nationalist districts. Eight people were shot dead and hundreds were injured. Scores of houses and businesses were burnt out, most of them owned by Catholics. In response, the British Army was deployed on the streets of Northern Ireland and Irish Army units set up field hospitals near the border. Thousands of families, mostly Catholics, were forced to flee their homes and refugee camps were set up in the Republic of Ireland.

On 12 October, a loyalist protest in the Shankill became violent. During the riot, UVF members shot dead RUC officer Victor Arbuckle. He was the first RUC officer to be killed during the Troubles.

The UVF had launched its first attack in the Republic of Ireland on 5 August 1969, when it bombed the RTÉ Television Centre in Dublin. There were further attacks in the Republic between October and December 1969. In October, UVF and UPV member Thomas McDowell was killed by the bomb he was planting at Ballyshannon power station. The UVF stated that the attempted attack was a protest against the Irish Army units "still massed on the border in County Donegal". In December, the UVF detonated a car bomb near the Garda central detective bureau and telephone exchange headquarters in Dublin.

=== Early to mid-1970s ===
In January 1970, the UVF began bombing Catholic-owned businesses in Protestant areas of Belfast. It issued a statement vowing to "remove republican elements from loyalist areas" and stop them "reaping financial benefit therefrom". During 1970, 42 Catholic-owned licensed premises in Protestant areas were bombed. Catholic churches were also attacked. In February, it began to target critics of militant loyalism – the homes of MPs Austin Currie, Sheelagh Murnaghan, Richard Ferguson and Anne Dickson were attacked with improvised bombs. It also continued its attacks in the Republic of Ireland, bombing the Dublin-Belfast railway line, an electricity substation, a radio mast, and Irish nationalist monuments.

The IRA had split into the Provisional IRA and Official IRA in December 1969. In 1971, these ramped up their activity against the British Army and RUC. The first British soldier to be killed by the Provisional IRA died in February 1971. That year, a string of tit-for-tat pub bombings began in Belfast. This came to a climax on 4 December, when the UVF bombed McGurk's Bar, a Catholic-owned pub in Belfast. Fifteen Catholic civilians were killed and seventeen wounded. It was the UVF's deadliest attack in Northern Ireland, and the deadliest attack in Belfast during the Troubles.

The following year, 1972, was the most violent of the Troubles. Along with the newly formed Ulster Defence Association (UDA), the UVF started an armed campaign against the Catholic population of Northern Ireland. It began carrying out gun attacks to kill random Catholic civilians and using car bombs to attack Catholic-owned pubs. It would continue these tactics for the rest of its campaign. On 23 October 1972, the UVF carried out an armed raid against King's Park camp, a UDR/Territorial Army depot in Lurgan. They managed to procure a large cache of weapons and ammunition including L1A1 Self-Loading Rifles, Browning pistols, and Sterling submachine guns. Twenty tons of ammonium nitrate was also stolen from the Belfast docks.

The UVF launched further attacks in the Republic of Ireland during December 1972 and January 1973, when it detonated three car bombs in Dublin and one in Belturbet, County Cavan, killing a total of five civilians. It would attack the Republic again in May 1974, during the two-week Ulster Workers' Council strike. This was a general strike in protest against the Sunningdale Agreement, which meant sharing political power with Irish nationalists and the Republic having more involvement in Northern Ireland. Along with the UDA, it helped to enforce the strike by blocking roads, intimidating workers, and shutting any businesses that opened. On 17 May, two UVF units from the Belfast and Mid-Ulster brigades detonated four car bombs in Dublin and Monaghan. Thirty-three people were killed and almost 300 injured. It was the deadliest attack of the Troubles. There are various allegations, such as from Justice for the Forgotten, that elements of the British security forces colluded with the UVF in the bombings. The Irish parliament's Joint Committee on Justice called the bombings an act of "international terrorism" involving members of the British security forces. Both the UVF and the British government have denied the claims. In December 2025, the Kenova Report shown no evidence of collusion and involvement.

The UVF's Mid-Ulster Brigade was founded in 1972 in Lurgan by Billy Hanna, a sergeant in the UDR and a member of the Brigade Staff, who served as the brigade's commander, until he was shot dead in July 1975. From that time until the early 1990s the Mid-Ulster Brigade was led by Robin "the Jackal" Jackson, who then passed the leadership to Billy Wright. Hanna and Jackson have both been implicated by journalist Joe Tiernan and RUC Special Patrol Group (SPG) officer John Weir as having led one of the units that bombed Dublin. Jackson was allegedly the hitman who shot Hanna dead outside his home in Lurgan.

The brigade formed part of the Glenanne gang, a loose alliance of loyalists which the Pat Finucane Centre (PFC) has linked to 87 killings in the 1970s. The gang comprised, in addition to members the UVF, elements of the UDR and RUC, all of which were allegedly acting under the direction of the Intelligence Corps and/or the RUC Special Branch according to the PFC.

=== Mid- to late 1970s ===
In 1974, hardliners staged a coup and took over the Brigade Staff. This resulted in a sharp increase in sectarian killings and internecine feuding, both with the UDA and within the UVF itself. Some of the new Brigade Staff members bore nicknames such as "Big Dog" and "Smudger". Beginning in 1975, recruitment to the UVF, which until then had been solely by invitation, was now left to the discretion of local units.

The UVF's Mid-Ulster Brigade carried out further attacks during this same period. These included the Miami Showband killings of 31 July 1975 – when three members of the popular showband were killed, having been stopped at a fake British Army checkpoint outside Newry in County Down. Two members of the group survived the attack and later testified against those responsible. Two UVF members, Harris Boyle and Wesley Somerville, were accidentally killed by their own bomb while carrying out this attack. Two of those later convicted (James McDowell and Thomas Crozier) were also serving members of the Ulster Defence Regiment (UDR), a regular Army regiment consisting of Northern Irish reservists.

From late 1975 to mid-1977, a unit of the UVF dubbed the Shankill Butchers (a group of UVF men based on Belfast's Shankill Road) carried out a series of sectarian murders of Catholic civilians. Six of the victims were abducted at random, then beaten and tortured before having their throats slashed. This gang was led by Lenny Murphy. He was shot dead by the IRA in November 1982, four months after his release from the Maze Prison.

The group had been proscribed in July 1966, but this ban was lifted on 4 April 1974 by Merlyn Rees, Secretary of State for Northern Ireland, in an effort to bring the UVF into the democratic process. A political wing was formed in June 1974, the Volunteer Political Party led by UVF Chief of Staff Ken Gibson, which contested West Belfast in the October 1974 general election, polling 2,690 votes (6%). However, the UVF spurned the government efforts and continued killing. Colin Wallace, a member of the Intelligence Corps, asserted in an internal memo in 1975 that MI6 and RUC Special Branch formed a pseudo-gang within the UVF, designed to engage in violence and to subvert the tentative moves of some in the UVF towards the political process. Captain Robert Nairac of 14 Intelligence Company was alleged to have been involved in several UVF operations. The UVF was banned again on 3 October 1975 and two days later twenty-six suspected UVF members were arrested in a series of raids. The men were tried, and in March 1977 were sentenced to an average of twenty-five years each.

In October 1975, after staging a counter-coup, the Brigade Staff acquired a new leadership of moderates with Tommy West serving as the Chief of Staff. These men had overthrown the "hawkish" officers, who had called for a "big push", which meant an increase in violent attacks, earlier in the same month. The UVF was behind the deaths of seven civilians in a series of attacks on 2 October. The hawks had been ousted by those in the UVF who were unhappy with their political and military strategy. The new Brigade Staff's aim was to carry out attacks against known republicans rather than Catholic civilians. This was endorsed by Gusty Spence, who issued a statement asking all UVF volunteers to support the new regime. The UVF's activities in the last years of the decade were increasingly being curtailed by the number of UVF members who were sent to prison. The number of killings in Northern Ireland had decreased from around 300 per year between 1973 and 1976 to just under 100 in the years 1977–1981. In 1976, Tommy West was replaced with "Mr. F" who is alleged to be John "Bunter" Graham, who remains the incumbent Chief of Staff to date. West died in 1980.

On 17 February 1979, the UVF carried out its only major attack in Scotland, when its members bombed two pubs in Glasgow frequented by Irish-Scots Catholics. Both pubs were wrecked and a number of people were wounded. It claimed the pubs were used for republican fundraising. In June, nine UVF members were convicted of the attacks.

=== Early to mid-1980s ===
In the 1980s, the UVF was greatly reduced by a series of police informers. The damage from security service informers started in 1983 with "supergrass" Joseph Bennett's information, which led to the arrest of fourteen senior figures. In 1984, the UVF attempted to kill the northern editor of the Sunday World, Jim Campbell after he had exposed the paramilitary activities of Mid-Ulster brigadier Robin Jackson. Another loyalist paramilitary organisation called Ulster Resistance was formed on 10 November 1986. The initial aim of Ulster Resistance was to bring an end to the Anglo-Irish Agreement. Loyalists were successful in importing arms into Northern Ireland. The arms were divided between the UVF, the UDA (the largest loyalist group) and Ulster Resistance.

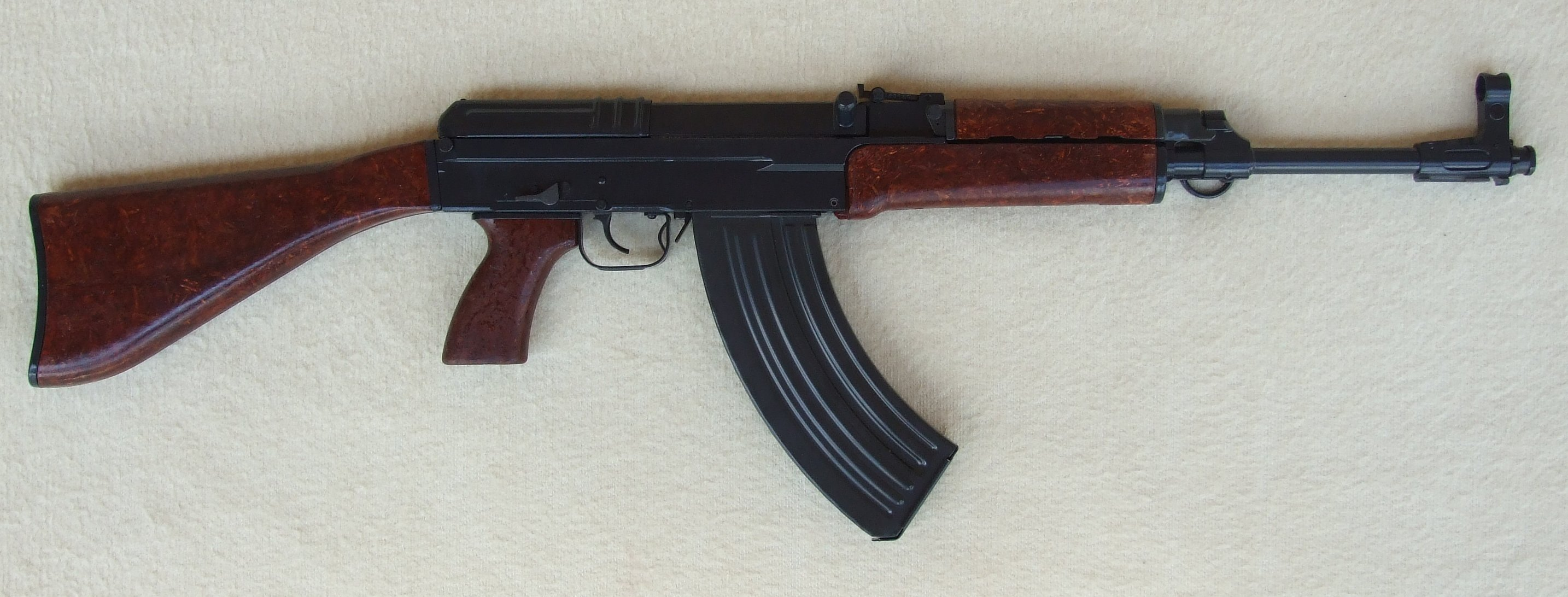
The UVF received large numbers of Czechoslovak Sa vz. 58 automatic rifles in the 1980s

The arms are thought to have consisted of:

- 200 Czechoslovak Sa vz. 58 automatic rifles,
- 90 Browning pistols,
- 500 RGD-5 fragmentation grenades,
- 30,000 rounds of ammunition and
- 12 RPG-7 rocket launchers and 150 warheads.

The UVF used this new infusion of arms to escalate their campaign of sectarian assassinations. This era also saw a more widespread targeting on the UVF's part of IRA and Sinn Féin members, beginning with the killing of senior IRA member Larry Marley and a failed attempt on the life of a leading republican which left three Catholic civilians dead.

=== Late 1980s and early 1990s ===
The UVF also attacked republican paramilitaries and political activists. These attacks were stepped up in the late 1980s and early 1990s, particularly in the east Tyrone and north Armagh areas. The largest death toll in a single attack was in the 3 March 1991 Cappagh killings, when the UVF killed IRA members John Quinn, Dwayne O'Donnell and Malcolm Nugent, and civilian Thomas Armstrong in the small village of Cappagh. Republicans responded to the attacks by assassinating senior UVF members John Bingham, William "Frenchie" Marchant and Trevor King as well as Leslie Dallas, whose purported UVF membership was disputed both by his family and the UVF. The UVF also killed senior IRA paramilitary members Liam Ryan, John 'Skipper' Burns and Larry Marley. According to Conflict Archive on the Internet (CAIN), the UVF killed 17 active and four former republican paramilitaries. CAIN also states that republicans killed 15 UVF members, some of whom are suspected to have been set up for assassination by their colleagues.

According to journalist and author Ed Moloney, the UVF campaign in Mid-Ulster in this period "indisputably shattered Republican morale", and put the leadership of the republican movement under intense pressure to "do something", although this has been disputed by others.

=== 1994 ceasefire ===
In 1990, the UVF joined the Combined Loyalist Military Command (CLMC) and indicated its acceptance of moves towards peace. However, the year leading up to the loyalist ceasefire, which took place shortly after the Provisional IRA ceasefire, saw some of the worst sectarian killings carried out by loyalists during the Troubles. On 18 June 1994, UVF members machine-gunned a pub in the Loughinisland massacre in County Down, on the basis that its customers were watching the Republic of Ireland national football team playing in the World Cup on television and were therefore assumed to be Catholics. The gunmen shot dead six people and injured five.

The UVF agreed to a ceasefire in October 1994.

=== Post-ceasefire activities ===
==== 1994–2005 ====
More militant members of the UVF who disagreed with the ceasefire, broke away to form the Loyalist Volunteer Force (LVF), led by Billy Wright. This development came soon after the UVF's Brigade Staff in Belfast had stood down Wright and the Portadown unit of the Mid-Ulster Brigade, on 2 August 1996, for the killing of a Catholic taxi driver near Lurgan during Drumcree disturbances.

There followed years of violence between the two organisations. In January 2000 UVF Mid-Ulster brigadier Richard Jameson was shot dead by a LVF gunman which led to an escalation of the UVF/LVF feud. The UVF was also clashing with the UDA in the summer of 2000. The feud with the UDA ended in December following seven deaths. Veteran anti-UVF campaigner Raymond McCord, whose son, Raymond Jr., a Protestant, was beaten to death by UVF men in 1997, estimates the UVF has killed more than thirty people since its 1994 ceasefire, most of them Protestants. The feud between the UVF and the LVF erupted again in the summer of 2005. The UVF killed four men in Belfast and trouble ended only when the LVF announced that it was disbanding in October of that year.

On 14 September 2005, following serious loyalist rioting during which dozens of shots were fired at riot police and the British Army, the Northern Ireland Secretary Peter Hain announced that the British government no longer recognised the UVF ceasefire.

==== 2006–2010 ====
On 12 February 2006, The Observer reported that the UVF was to disband by the end of 2006. The newspaper also reported that the group refused to decommission its weapons.

On 2 September 2006, BBC News reported the UVF might be intending to re-enter dialogue with the Independent International Commission on Decommissioning, with a view to decommissioning of their weapons. This move came as the organisation held high-level discussions about its future.

On 3 May 2007, following recent negotiations between the Progressive Unionist Party (PUP) and Irish Taoiseach Bertie Ahern and with Police Service of Northern Ireland (PSNI) Chief Constable Sir Hugh Orde, the UVF made a statement that they would transform to a "non-military, civilianised" organisation. This was to take effect from midnight. They also stated that they would retain their weaponry but put them beyond reach of normal volunteers. Their weapons stock-piles are to be retained under the watch of the UVF leadership.

In January 2008, the UVF was accused of involvement in vigilante action against alleged criminals in Belfast.

In 2008, a loyalist splinter group calling itself the "Real UVF" emerged briefly to make threats against Sinn Féin in County Fermanagh.

In the twentieth IMC report, the group was said to be continuing to put its weapons "beyond reach", (in the group's own words) to downsize, and reduce the criminality of the group. The report added that individuals, some current and some former members, in the group have, without the orders from above, continued with "localised recruitment", and although some continued to try and acquire weapons, including a senior member, most forms of crime had fallen, including shootings and assaults. The group concluded a general acceptance of the need to decommission, though there was no conclusive proof of moves towards this end.

In June 2009 the UVF formally decommissioned their weapons in front of independent witnesses as a formal statement of decommissioning was read by Dawn Purvis and Billy Hutchinson. The IICD confirmed that "substantial quantities of firearms, ammunition, explosives and explosive devices" had been decommissioned and that for the UVF and RHC, decommissioning had been completed.

==== 2010–2019 ====
The UVF was blamed for the shotgun killing of expelled RHC member Bobby Moffett on the Shankill Road on the afternoon of 28 May 2010, in front of passers-by including children. The Independent Monitoring Commission stated Moffett was killed by UVF members acting with the sanction of the leadership. The Progressive Unionist Party's condemnation, and Dawn Purvis and other leaders' resignations as a response to the Moffett shooting, were also noted. Eleven months later, a man was arrested and charged with the attempted murder of the UVF's alleged second-in-command Harry Stockman, described by the Belfast Telegraph as a "senior Loyalist figure". Fifty-year-old Stockman was stabbed more than 10 times in a supermarket in Belfast; the attack was believed to have been linked to the Moffett killing.

On 25–26 October 2010, the UVF was involved in rioting and disturbances in the Rathcoole area of Newtownabbey with UVF gunmen seen on the streets at the time.

On the night of 20 June 2011, riots involving 500 people erupted in the Short Strand area of East Belfast. They were blamed by the PSNI on members of the UVF, who also said UVF guns had been used to try to kill police officers. The UVF leader in East Belfast, who is popularly known as the "Beast of the East" and "Ugly Doris" also known as by real name Stephen Matthews, ordered the attack on Catholic homes and a church in the Catholic enclave of the Short Strand. This was in retaliation for attacks on Loyalist homes the previous weekend and after a young girl was hit in the face with a brick by Republicans. A dissident Republican was arrested for "the attempted murder of police officers in east Belfast" after shots were fired upon the police.

In July 2011, a UVF flag flying in Limavady was deemed legal by the PSNI after the police had received complaints about the flag from nationalist politicians.

During the Belfast City Hall flag protests of 2012–13, senior UVF members were confirmed to have actively been involved in orchestrating violence and rioting against the PSNI and the Alliance Party throughout Northern Ireland during the weeks of disorder. Much of the UVF's orchestration was carried out by its senior members in East Belfast, where many attacks on the PSNI and on residents of the Short Strand enclave took place. There were also reports that UVF members fired shots at police lines during a protest. The high levels of orchestration by the leadership of the East Belfast UVF, and the alleged ignored orders from the main leaders of the UVF to stop the violence has led to fears that the East Belfast UVF has now become a separate loyalist paramilitary grouping which doesn't abide by the UVF ceasefire or the Northern Ireland Peace Process.

In October 2013, the policing board announced that the UVF was still heavily involved in gangsterism despite its ceasefire. Assistant chief constable Drew Harris in a statement said "The UVF are subject to an organised crime investigation as an organised crime group. The UVF very clearly have involvement in drug dealing, all forms of gangsterism, serious assaults, intimidation of the community."

In November 2013, after a series of shootings and acts of intimidation by the UVF, Police Federation Chairman Terry Spence declared that the UVF ceasefire was no longer active. Spence told Radio Ulster that the UVF had been "engaged in murder, attempted murder of civilians, attempted murder of police officers. They have been engaged in orchestrating violence on our streets, and it's very clear to me that they are engaged in an array of mafia-style activities. "They are holding local communities to ransom. On the basis of that, we as a federation have called for the respecification of the UVF [stating that its ceasefire is over]."

In June 2017, Gary Haggarty, former UVF commander for north Belfast and south-east Antrim, pleaded guilty to 200 charges, including five murders.

On 23 March 2019, eleven alleged UVF members were arrested during a total of 14 searches conducted in Belfast, Newtownards and Comber and the suspects, aged between 22 and 48, were taken into police custody for questioning. Officers from the PSNI's Paramilitary Crime Task Force also seized drugs, cash and expensive cars and jewellery in an operation carried out against the criminal activities of the UVF crime gang.

=== 2020s ===
On 4 March 2021, the UVF, Red Hand Commando and UDA renounced their current participation in the Good Friday Agreement.

In April 2021, riots erupted across Loyalist communities in Northern Ireland. On 11 April, the UVF reportedly ordered the removal of Catholic families from a housing estate in Carrickfergus.

The UVF was suspected of organising a hoax bomb attack targeting a "peace-building" event in Belfast where Irish Foreign Minister Simon Coveney was speaking on 27 March 2022. Armed men hijacked a van on the nearby Shankill Road and forced the driver to take a device to a church on the Crumlin Road. The community centre hosting the event and 25 nearby homes were evacuated and a funeral was disrupted. A controlled explosion was carried out and the bomb was declared a hoax.

The group also continues to carry out racist and sectarian attacks against immigrants and minorities in Northern Ireland. The police stated that the UVF had contributed to a 70% rise in hate crime: "It has a deeply unpleasant taste of a bit of ethnic cleansing".

Despite reports of the UVF to disband, one of its senior figures was sentenced for possession of a firearm and ammunition in suspicious circumstances.

== Leadership ==
=== Brigade Staff ===
Masked UVF Brigade Staff members at a press conference in October 1974. They are wearing part of the UVF uniform which earned them their nickname "Blacknecks"

The UVF's leadership is based in Belfast and known as the Brigade Staff. It comprises high-ranking officers under a Chief of Staff or Brigadier-General. With a few exceptions, such as Mid-Ulster brigadier Billy Hanna (a native of Lurgan), the Brigade Staff members have been from the Shankill Road or the neighbouring Woodvale area to the west. The Brigade Staff's former headquarters were situated in rooms above "The Eagle" chip shop located on the Shankill Road at its junction with Spier's Place. The chip shop has since been closed down.

In 1972, the UVF's imprisoned leader Gusty Spence was at liberty for four months following a staged kidnapping by UVF volunteers. During this time he restructured the organisation into brigades, battalions, companies, platoons and sections. These were all subordinate to the Brigade Staff. The incumbent Chief of Staff, is alleged to be John "Bunter" Graham, referred to by Martin Dillon as "Mr. F". Graham has held the position since he assumed office in 1976.

The UVF's nickname is "Blacknecks", derived from their uniform of black polo neck jumper, black trousers, black leather jacket, black forage cap, along with the UVF badge and belt. This uniform, based on those of the original UVF, was introduced in the early 1970s.

=== Chiefs of Staff ===
- Gusty Spence (1966). Whilst remaining de jure UVF leader after he was jailed for murder, he no longer acted as Chief of Staff.
- Samuel Stevenson (1966‐1969). Stevenson, a close ally of Rev. Ian Paisley, confessed to being UVF chief of staff while undergoing questioning on explosives, a charge he later admitted 1970.
- Sam "Bo" McClelland (1969–1973) Described as a "tough disciplinarian", he was personally appointed by Spence to succeed him as Chief of Staff, due to his having served in the Korean War with Spence's former regiment, the Royal Ulster Rifles. He was interned in late 1973, although by that stage the de facto Chief of Staff was his successor, Jim Hanna.
- Jim Hanna (1973 – April 1974) Hanna was allegedly shot dead by the UVF as a suspected informer.
- Ken Gibson (1974) Gibson was the Chief of Staff during the Ulster Workers' Council Strike in May 1974.
- Unnamed Chief of Staff (1974 – October 1975). Leader of the Young Citizen Volunteers (YCV), the youth wing of the UVF. Assumed command after a coup by hardliners in 1974. He, along with the other hawkish Brigade Staff members, was overthrown by Tommy West and a new Brigade Staff of "moderates" in a counter-coup supported by Gusty Spence. He left Northern Ireland after his removal from power.
- Tommy West (October 1975 – 1976) A former British Army soldier, West was already the Chief of Staff at the time UVF volunteer Noel "Nogi" Shaw was killed by Lenny Murphy in November 1975 as part of an internal feud.
- John "Bunter" Graham, also referred to as "Mr. F" (1976–present)

== Aim and strategy ==
A UVF publicity photo showing masked and armed UVF members on patrol in Belfast

The UVF's stated goal was to combat Irish republicanism – particularly the Provisional Irish Republican Army (IRA) – and maintain Northern Ireland's status as part of the United Kingdom. The vast majority of its victims were Irish Catholic civilians, who were often killed at random. Whenever it claimed responsibility for its attacks, the UVF usually claimed that those targeted were IRA members or were giving help to the IRA. At other times, attacks on Catholic civilians were claimed as "retaliation" for IRA actions, since the IRA drew almost all of its support from the Catholic community. Such retaliation was seen as both collective punishment and an attempt to weaken the IRA's support; it was thought that terrorising the Catholic community and inflicting such a death toll on it would force the IRA to end its campaign. Many retaliatory attacks on Catholics were claimed using the covername "Protestant Action Force" (PAF), which first appeared in autumn 1974. They always signed their statements with the fictitious name "Captain William Johnston".

Like the Ulster Defence Association (UDA), the UVF's modus operandi involved assassinations, mass shootings, bombings and kidnappings. It used submachine guns, assault rifles, shotguns, pistols, grenades (including homemade grenades), incendiary bombs, booby trap bombs and car bombs. Referring to its activity in the early and mid-1970s, journalist Ed Moloney described no-warning pub bombings as the UVF's "forte". Members were trained in bomb-making, and the organisation developed home-made explosives. In the late summer and autumn of 1973, the UVF detonated more bombs than the UDA and IRA combined, and by the time of the group's temporary ceasefire in late November it had been responsible for over 200 explosions that year. However, from 1977 bombs largely disappeared from the UVF's arsenal owing to a lack of explosives and bomb-makers, plus a conscious decision to abandon their use in favour of more contained methods. The UVF did not return to regular bombings until the early 1990s when it obtained a quantity of the mining explosive Powergel.

=== Strength ===
The strength of the UVF is uncertain. The first Independent Monitoring Commission report in April 2004 described the UVF/RHC as "relatively small" with "a few hundred" active members "based mainly in the Belfast and immediately adjacent areas". Historically, the number of active UVF members in July 1971 was stated by one source to be no more than 20. Later, in September 1972, Gusty Spence said in an interview that the organisation had a strength of 1,500. A British Army report released in 2006 estimated a peak membership of 1,000. Information regarding the role of women in the UVF is limited. One study focusing in part on female members of the UVF and Red Hand Commando noted that it "seem[ed] to have been reasonably unusual" for women to be officially asked to join the UVF. Another estimates that over a 30-year period women accounted for, at most, just 2% of UVF membership.

=== Finance ===
Prior to and after the onset of the Troubles the UVF carried out armed robberies. This activity has been described as its preferred source of funds in the early 1970s, and it continued into the 2000s, with the UVF in County Londonderry being active. Members were disciplined after they carried out an unsanctioned theft of £8 million of paintings from an estate in Co Wicklow in April 1974. Like the IRA, the UVF also operated black taxi services, a scheme believed to have generated £100,000 annually for the organisation. The UVF has also been involved in the extortion of legitimate businesses, although to a lesser extent than the UDA, and was described in the fifth IMC report as being involved in organised crime. In 2002 the Northern Ireland Affairs Committee estimated the UVF's annual running costs at £1–2 million per year, against an annual fundraising capability of £1.5 million.

A Canadian branch of the UDA also existed and sent $30,000 to the UDA's headquarters in Belfast by 1975. The Northern Ireland Affairs Select Committee noted in its report that "in 1992 it was estimated that Scottish support for the UDA and UVF might amount to £100,000 a year."

==== Drug dealing ====
The UVF have been implicated in drug dealing in areas from where they draw their support. Recently it has emerged from the Police Ombudsman that senior North Belfast UVF member and Royal Ulster Constabulary (RUC) Special Branch informant Mark Haddock has been involved in drug dealing. According to the Belfast Telegraph, "70 separate police intelligence reports implicating the north Belfast UVF man in dealing cannabis, Ecstasy, amphetamines and cocaine."

According to Alan McQuillan, the assistant director of the Assets Recovery Agency in 2005, "In the loyalist community, drug dealing is run by the paramilitaries and it is generally run for personal gain by a large number of people." When the Assets Recovery Agency won a High Court order to seize luxury homes belonging to ex-policeman Colin Robert Armstrong and his partner Geraldine Mallon in 2005, Alan McQuillan said "We have further alleged Armstrong has had links with the UVF and then the LVF following the split between those organisations." It was alleged that Colin Armstrong had links to both drugs and loyalist terrorists.

Billy Wright, the commander of the UVF Mid-Ulster Brigade, is believed to have started dealing drugs in 1991 as a lucrative sideline to paramilitary murder. Wright is believed to have dealt mainly in Ecstasy tablets in the early 90s. It was around this time that Sunday World journalists Martin O'Hagan and Jim Campbell coined the term "rat pack" for the UVF's murderous mid-Ulster unit and, unable to identify Wright by name for legal reasons, they christened him "King Rat." An article published by the newspaper fingered Wright as a drug lord and sectarian murderer. Wright was apparently enraged by the nickname and made numerous threats to O'Hagan and Campbell. The Sunday World's offices were also firebombed. Mark Davenport from the BBC has stated that he spoke to a drug dealer who told him that he paid Billy Wright protection money. Loyalists in Portadown such as Bobby Jameson have stated that the LVF (the Mid-Ulster Brigade that broke away from the main UVF - and led by Billy Wright) was not a 'loyalist organisation but a drugs organisation causing misery in Portadown.'

The UVF's satellite organisation, the Red Hand Commando, was described by the IMC in 2004 as "heavily involved" in drug dealing.

== Arms importation ==
In contrast to the IRA, overseas support for loyalist paramilitaries including the UVF has been limited. Its main benefactors have been in central Scotland, Liverpool, Preston and the Toronto area of Canada.

=== Great Britain ===
Scotland was a source of funding and aid, supplying explosives and guns. Former MI5 agent Willie Carlin said: “There were safe houses in Glasgow and Stirling. The ferry [between Scotland and Northern Ireland] was pivotal in getting arms into the north – and anything like checkpoints, or armed police and Army in Scotland would have b******d that all up.” An Irish government memo written by David Donoghue stated: "The commonest contribution of Scots UDA and UVF is to send gelignite. Explosives for the north were mostly shipped in small boats which set out at night from the Scottish coast and made contact at sea with vessels from Ulster ports." Donoghue noted the links between Orange Lodges in Scotland and loyalist paramilitary groups in Northern Ireland and that membership of the Orange Order in Scotland at the time was 80,000, and was concentrated in Glasgow, Lanarkshire and Inverness. It is estimated that the UVF nevertheless received hundreds of thousands of pounds in donations to its Loyalist Prisoners Welfare Association.

=== North America ===
Protestants in Canada also supported the loyalist paramilitaries in the conflict. Sociologist Steven Bruce described the support networks in Canada as "the main source of support for loyalism outside the United Kingdom ... Ontario is to Ulster Protestants what Boston is to Irish Catholics." After the Troubles began, an Orange-Canadian loyalist organization known as the Canadian Ulster Loyalist Association (CULA) sprang to life to provide the 'besieged' Protestants with the resources to arm themselves. In 1972, five Toronto businessmen shipped weapons in grain container ships out of Halifax, bound for ports in Scotland, Wales, and Northern Ireland which were destined for loyalist militants. Etobicoke based gunsmith William Charles Taylor and former Canadian Army Reserve officer Howard Wright sourced many second hand firearms at gun shows in the US and then smuggled them to the UVF wrapped in lead foil (to defeat X Ray scanners) in packages marked as "car components" from Old Mill Pontiac Buick in Toronto. Additionally, any semi-automatic rifles or submachine guns they sourced were first illegally converted to full-auto by Taylor before shipment. The pair were responsible for the UVF obtaining hundreds of military grade weapons such as MAC-10s, Uzis, and Colt Commando carbines in the early 1980s. Between 1979 and 1986, Canadian supporters supplied the UVF/UDA with 100 machine guns and thousands of rifles, grenade launchers, magnum revolvers, and hundreds of thousands of rounds of ammunition. These shipments were considered enough for the UVF/UDA to wage its campaign, most of which were used to kill its victims. On 10 February 1976, following the sudden uptick of violence against Catholic civilians by loyalist militants, Irish cardinal William Conway and nine other Catholic bishops met with British Prime Minister Harold Wilson and his cabinet, asking them as to where the loyalist militants had acquired guns, to which Secretary of State for Northern Ireland Merlyn Rees replied "Canada".

=== Middle East ===
In June 1987, the UVF stole over £325,000 during an armed robbery at a branch of the Northern Bank in Portadown. The cash was then laundered through Swiss banks accounts and other financial institutions in mainland Europe, where "respectable" members of the Unionist business community made in person lodgements. The money was then used to buy an arms shipment from Christian militia groups in Lebanon, that was to be split evenly between the UVF, the UDA, and Ulster Resistance. The weapons, which amounted to over 200 Vz. 58 assault rifles, 94 Browning Hi-Power pistols, 4 RPG-7 rocket launchers and dozens of warheads, over 400 RGD-5 grenades and 30,000 rounds of ammunition arrived at Belfast docks in December 1987, and was thereafter distributed to the three loyalist paramilitary groups. Although the arms were sourced in Lebanon, it has been alleged that the ultimate supplier was Armscor in South Africa, who funneled the shipment through a series of middlemen (such as American arms dealer Douglas Bernhardt) to disguise its true source. After the cash had been couriered over to Bernhardt's office in Geneva, he was alleged to have then arranged a bank draft to be forwarded to an arms dealer in Beirut, who then sourced the weapons and loaded then into a shipping container labelled as ceramic floor tiles. A supposed motive for Apartheid South Africa to get involved in supplying arms to loyalist paramilitary groups was their attempts to obtain classified Starstreak surface-to-air missile technology from the Short Brothers factory in Belfast, evidence of which was uncovered after representatives from Ulster Resistance were arrested in Paris in April 1989, along with Bernhardt and a diplomat from South Africa, while in the possession of stolen missile parts.

=== Eastern Europe ===
On 24 November 1993, following a tip off from MI6, UK customs officers raided the MV Inowroclaw cargo ship while it was docked at Teesport and discovered a UVF weapons and explosives shipment hidden amongst a load of ceramic tiles. The shipment, which was described as the biggest illegal arms seizure on British soil, contained 300 AKM rifles with thousands of rounds of ammunition, dozens of 9mm pistols, hundreds of hand grenades, over two metric tons of plastic explosives and thousands of detonators. The ship had originated in the Baltic Sea port of Gdynia, and Polish authorities had warned British intelligence agencies in advance of its arrival in England.

== List of weapons used by the UVF ==
=== Firearms ===
==== Handguns ====
Model	Image	Caliber	Type	Origin	Details
Browning Hi-Power		9×19mm Parabellum	Pistol	Belgium	Imported from Lebanon in 1987
Star Model B		9×19mm Parabellum	Pistol	Spain	
Smith & Wesson Model 27		.357 Magnum	Revolver	United States	Imported from Canada in the early 1980s

==== Submachine guns ====
Model	Image	Caliber	Type	Origin	Details
Sten		9×19mm Parabellum	Submachine Gun	United Kingdom	
Sterling		9×19mm Parabellum	Submachine Gun	United Kingdom	
Uzi		9×19mm Parabellum	Submachine Gun	Israel	Imported from Canada in the early 1980s
MAC-10		.45 ACP	Submachine Gun	United States	Imported from Canada in the early 1980s

==== Assault rifles ====
Model	Image	Caliber	Type	Origin	Details
Colt Commando		5.56×45mm NATO	Assault rifle	United States	Imported from Canada in the early 1980s
ArmaLite AR-18		5.56×45mm NATO	Assault rifle	United States	Stolen from Provisional Irish Republican Army arms dumps
Ruger Mini-14		5.56×45mm NATO	Assault rifle	United States	Imported from Canada in the early 1980s
Vz. 58		7.62×39mm	Assault rifle	Czechoslovak Socialist Republic	Imported from Lebanon in 1987
SA80		5.56×45mm NATO	Assault rifle	United Kingdom	Stolen from a UDR base in 1989
L1A1 Self-Loading Rifle		7.62×51mm NATO	Battle rifle	United Kingdom	Stolen from a UDR base in 1972

==== Machine guns ====
Model	Image	Caliber	Type	Origin	Details
Bren gun		.303 British	Light machine gun	United Kingdom	
M60		7.62×51mm NATO	General-purpose machine gun	United States	Imported from Canada in the early 1980s

=== Anti-tank weapons ===
Model	Image	Caliber	Type	Origin	Details
RPG-7		40mm	Rocket-propelled grenade	Soviet Union	Imported from Lebanon in 1987

=== Explosives ===
Model	Image	Type	Origin	Details
IED		Improvised explosive device	United Kingdom	As well as ANFO car bombs, Gelignite was used for pipe bombs and satchel charges
RGD-5		Hand Grenade	Soviet Union	Imported from Lebanon in 1987

== Affiliated groups ==
- The Red Hand Commando (RHC) is an organisation that was established in 1972 and is closely linked with the UVF. It also allowed other groups to claim attacks under its name.
- The Young Citizen Volunteers (YCV) is the youth section of the UVF. It was initially a youth group akin to the Scouts, but became the youth wing of the UVF during the Home Rule crisis.
- The Progressive Unionist Party (PUP) is the political wing of the UVF. In June 2010, its sole member in the Northern Ireland Assembly, party leader Dawn Purvis, resigned from the PUP over the UVF being accused of involvement in the Moffett murder.
- The Protestant Action Force (PAF) and, in the early 1970s Protestant Action Group (PAG), was a cover name often used by the UVF to avoid directly claiming responsibility for killings and other acts of violence.

== Deaths as a result of activity ==
The UVF has killed more people than any other loyalist paramilitary group. Malcolm Sutton's Index of Deaths from the Conflict in Ireland, part of the Conflict Archive on the Internet (CAIN), states that the UVF and RHC was responsible for at least 485 killings during the Troubles, and lists a further 256 loyalist killings that have not yet been attributed to a particular group. According to the book Lost Lives (2006 edition), it was responsible for 569 killings.

Of those killed by the UVF and RHC:

- 414 (~85%) were civilians, 11 of whom were civilian political activists
- 44 (~9%) were members or former members of loyalist paramilitary groups
- 21 (~4%) were members or former members of republican paramilitary groups
- 6 (~1%) were members of the British security forces

There were also 66 UVF/RHC members and four former members killed in the conflict.

== See also ==
- Independent International Commission on Decommissioning (IICD) – Organisation overseeing Decommissioning
- Independent Monitoring Commission (IMC) – Organisation monitoring activity by paramilitary groups
- Irish issue in British politics
- UVF Mid-Ulster Brigade
- Young Citizen Volunteers
