= Attack on RUC Birches barracks =

1986 IRA attack in Northern Ireland

Attack on The Birches RUC barracks
- Part of The Troubles
- Location: 54°27′45.02″N 7°1′50″W; The Birches, County Armagh, Northern Ireland
- Date: 11 August 1986
- Attack type: shooting, bombing
- Weapons: automatic rifles explosive charge
- Deaths: 0 (RUC Barracks destroyed)
- Injuries: 3 civilians
- Perpetrator: Provisional IRA East Tyrone Brigade

On 11 August 1986, the East Tyrone Brigade of the Provisional Irish Republican Army (IRA) attacked the Royal Ulster Constabulary (RUC) base at The Birches near Portadown, County Armagh, Northern Ireland. The unmanned base was raked with gunfire before being destroyed by a 200 pounds (91 kg) bomb, which was driven through the gate of the base in the bucket of a JCB digger.

== Background ==
In 1985 the IRA's East Tyrone Brigade, commanded by Patrick J Kelly, began a campaign of destroying remote RUC stations and preventing anyone from rebuilding them, to create no-go zones.

On 7 December 1985 it launched an attack on the RUC barracks in Ballygawley, destroying the base and killing two RUC officers.

== Attack ==
It was a complex attack that involved several units, including teams of lookouts, an armed team and bomb-makers as well as a team to carry out a diversionary attack. A diversionary bomb attack was staged at Pomeroy to draw security forces away from the real target at the Birches. Another team hijacked a JCB digger, getaway vehicles and scout cars at Washing Bay.

The digger would be used to deliver the bomb to its target. The IRA did not expect any resistance as the RUC station was unmanned at the time of the attack. The IRA first raked the base with automatic gunfire while the digger, with a bomb in its bucket, was driven through the high wire perimeter fence; the fence was to protect the base from grenade or mortar attack. The digger was most likely driven by young IRA volunteer Declan Arthurs from Galbally, County Tyrone, who had experience driving diggers on his family's farm. A volunteer then lit a fuse and the bomb exploded after the IRA had retreated to safety in a waiting van. The blast destroyed most of the base and also damaged nearby buildings, blowing the roof off a pub across the road. The IRA team then made its getaway. According to journalist Mark Urban, the armed members of the unit evaded British security force roadblocks by escaping in a boat across Lough Neagh.

About 35 people were reportedly involved in the Birches attack, from planning, executing the attack and creating an escape route. A partially-disabled American tourist and two other civilians were slightly injured in the blast.

== Aftermath ==
A member of the British security forces told Mark Urban of the attack:

"The Birches RUC station was destroyed by the bomb, creating problems for the authorities about how to re-build it. The Tyrone IRA was able to combine practical skills such as bomb-making and the welding needed to make mortars with considerable resources. Its members went on operations carrying the latest assault rifles and often wore body-armour similar to that used by the security forces, giving them protection against pistol or sub-machine-gun fire. By 1987 they had also succeeded in obtaining night-sights, allowing them to aim weapons or observe their enemy in darkness."

The IRA unit's next major target was the RUC station at Loughgall, which was attacked in the same way. This operation was a disaster for the IRA as the IRA unit was ambushed by the SAS and the whole IRA unit of eight, along with a Catholic civilian, were shot dead. Many of those IRA volunteers killed at Loughgall had taken part in the Birches, like Padraig McKearney, Jim Lynagh and Patrick J Kelly.

== See also ==
- Chronology of Provisional Irish Republican Army actions (1980–1989)
