= Declan Arthurs =

Provisional IRA Volunteer (1965–1987)

- Born: 28 October 1965; Galbally, County Tyrone, Northern Ireland
- Died: 8 May 1987 (aged 21); Loughgall, County Armagh, Northern Ireland
- Known for: Killed during the Loughgall Ambush
- Military career
- Paramilitary: Provisional IRA
- Service years: 1982–1987
- Rank: Volunteer
- Unit: East Tyrone Brigade
- Conflicts: The Troubles: Attack on Ballygawley barracks; Attack on RUC Birches barracks; Loughgall Ambush

Declan Arthurs (28 October 1965 – 8 May 1987) was a Volunteer in the Provisional IRA's East Tyrone Brigade in the mid-1980s. He was killed in the Loughgall ambush, after bombing an RUC base.

== Early life ==
Declan Arthurs was born in Galbally, County Tyrone on 28 October 1965. He was one of six children, and the fourth of Paddy and Amelia Arthurs. Declan worked on the family farm learning how to drive diggers. He worked as an agricultural contractor for the farm. He had one young daughter.

== Paramilitary ==
Declan Arthurs joined the East Tyrone Brigade of the Provisional IRA in 1982 in the wake of Martin Hurson's death on the 1981 Irish Hunger Strike. Hurson was also from Galbally like Arthurs, and Arthurs and his friends looked up to Hurson. At the time he joined so did other young men from the same area, like Tony Gormley, Eugene Kelly, Seamus Donnelly and Martin McCaughey.

Over a year and a half year period in the mid-1980s the East Tyrone Brigade attacked and bombed RUC barracks and stations in Ballygawley, Tynan, The Birches, Coalisland, Dungannon, Carrickmore and Castlederg. They also bombed hotels and other businesses in Kildress, Ballyronan, Dungannon and Cookstown

Arthurs took part in two of the Provisional IRA's biggest attacks of the 1980s. The attack on Ballygawley barracks in December 1985 killed 4 UDR officers, and the attack on RUC Birches barracks in August 1986 killed 3 civilians. Arthurs was a key member of the team who drove a digger past a security fence, stopped it outside the barracks, lit a fuse, ran to safety and wrecked the barracks with a 200lb bomb in the JCB Digger.

== Death ==
Arthurs was killed along with seven other Provisional IRA Volunteers who were ambushed by the SAS during the Loughgall Ambush. Before the SAS fired he lit the 40-second fuse on the bomb and it destroyed most of the station, injuring a British soldier inside. The Loughgall ambush was planned to be a carbon copy attack of the bombing of The Birches barracks and the IRA expected no resistance. One of the photos of the aftermath of the ambush shows that Arthurs died with the Zippo lighter he used to light the fuse still in his hand.

Amelia Arthurs, Declan's mother, said of the ambush in an interview with journalist Peter Taylor, "He was mowed down. He could have been taken prisoner. They knew that the "boys" were coming and they lay in wait. The SAS never gave them a chance. Declan died for his country and I'm very proud of him. He was caught up in a war and he died." Despite these claims, the killings were ruled lawful. In December 2011, Northern Ireland's Historical Enquiries Team found that the Provisional IRA team fired first, and that they could not have been safely arrested. Thus, they concluded that the British Army was justified in opening fire.

Declan Arthurs is buried in St John's Cemetery, Galbally beside IRA Volunteer Seamus Donnelly who also died in the Loughgall ambush.

== See also ==
- East Tyrone Brigade
- Patrick Joseph Kelly
- Jim Lynagh
- Tommy McKearney
- Pádraig McKearney
