= The Troubles in Loughgall =

Incidents in Loughgall, Northern Ireland during the Troubles

Notable incidents during The Troubles in Loughgall, County Armagh.

== 1974 ==
- 19 February – Patrick Molloy (48), a Catholic, and John Wylie (49), a Protestant, were killed in an Ulster Volunteer Force (UVF) bomb attack on Trainor's Bar, Aghinlig, near Loughgall.

== 1976 ==
- 29 November – a local grocer was attacked by three men from an unknown faction, who then wrecked his shop via a planted bomb they left behind.

== 1987 ==
- 8 May – Declan Arthurs (21), Seamus Donnelly (19), Tony Gormley (25), Eugene Kelly (25), Patrick Joseph Kelly (30), Jim Lynagh (31), Pádraig McKearney (32) and Gerry O'Callaghan (29), all part of the Provisional IRA East Tyrone Brigade, were ambushed and killed by soldiers from the Special Air Service (SAS) while they attacked the Royal Ulster Constabulary (RUC) base in Loughgall. A civilian, Anthony Hughes (36), was also killed when he unwittingly drove into the ambush and was mistaken for an IRA member.

== 1989 ==
- 4 May – Northern Ireland Prison Service nursing officer John Griffiths (37) was killed by an IRA booby trap bomb under the seat of his car as he left home at Ballynick Road.

== 1990 ==
- 18 April – Martin Corrigan (25), a member of the Irish People's Liberation Organisation (IPLO), was killed during a gun battle with undercover soldiers while in the back garden of a house belonging to an RUC officer on the Lislasley Road, near Loughgall.
- 9 October – Dessie Grew (37) and Martin McCaughey (23), both members of the Provisional IRA East Tyrone Brigade, were shot dead by undercover soldiers at a derelict farmhouse on the Lislasley Road, near Loughgall.

== 1993 ==
- 11 February – Thomas Molloy (32), a Catholic civilian, was killed after being struck four times in the head and chest by a UVF gunman as he watched television at home with his family. His death may have been motivated by the false belief he was related to politician Francie Molloy.
- 24 February – Reginald Williamson (47), an RUC officer, was killed by an IRA bomb attached to his car when driving along Lislasley Road, near Loughgall.
