= Provisional IRA East Tyrone Brigade =

Republican paramilitary group in Northern Ireland

East Tyrone Brigade
- Active: December 1969 – July 1997
- Allegiance: Provisional Irish Republican Army
- Area of operations: East and South County Tyrone, North County Armagh
- Actions (Note: Individual members of the brigade were also involved in the Attack on Derryard checkpoint, the Crumlin Road Prison bombing and the Osnabrück barracks attack per cited sources.): Attack on UDR Clogher barracks Dungannon land mine attack Ballygawley Land Mine Attack; Mortar attack on Carrickmore barracks Attack on Ballygawley barracks Attack on RUC Birches barracks Loughgall Ambush; Ballygawley bus bombing Ambush at Drumnakilly; 1990 Gazelle shootdown Coagh ambush Teebane bombing Clonoe ambush Coalisland riots Mortar attack on Ballygawley barracks 1993 Fivemiletown ambush Killeeshil ambush 1997 Coalisland attack July 1997 riots

Commanders
- Notable commanders: Kevin Mallon (O/C 1970–73); Patrick Joseph Kelly (O/C 1983–87); Kevin McKenna (O/C 1977–83); Jim Lynagh; Brian Arthurs; Tommy McKearney (O/C 1973–77)

The East Tyrone Brigade of the Provisional Irish Republican Army (IRA), also known as the Tyrone/Monaghan Brigade was one of the most active republican paramilitary groups in Northern Ireland during "the Troubles". It is believed to have drawn its membership from across the eastern side of County Tyrone as well as north County Monaghan and south County Londonderry.

== List of notable actions from 1971 until Loughgall ==
- 14 September 1971: a British soldier (John Rudman, aged 21) was shot dead while on mobile patrol, Edendork, near Coalisland, County Tyrone. He was the first British soldier killed by the East Tyrone Brigade
- 14 March 1972: A two-man IRA unit armed with sub-machine guns ambushed a joint British Army/RUC patrol on Brackaville Road outside Coalisland. Over 50 shots were fired by the unit. The RUC officer, William Logan (aged 23), who was driving the police patrol vehicle was mortally wounded and died the following day, he was the first RUC officer killed by the brigade.
- 10 September 1972: Douglas Richmond (21), Duncan McPhee (21) and William McIntyre (23), all members of the British Army, were killed in an IRA land mine attack on their armoured personnel carrier, at Sanaghanroe, near Dungannon.
- 16 August 1973: two IRA volunteers, Daniel McAnallen (aged 27) and Patrick Quinn (aged 18), were killed when a mortar prematurely exploded during an attack on Pomeroy British Army/RUC base.
- 15 March 1974: Patrick McDonald (21) and Kevin Murray (27), both Catholic members of the IRA, were killed in the premature explosion of a land mine at Aughnacloy Road, Dungannon.
- 2 May 1974: Up to 40 members from the IRA's East Tyrone Brigade attacked the isolated 6 UDR Deanery base in Clogher, County Tyrone with machine gun and RPG fire resulting in the death of Private Eva Martin, a UDR Greenfinch, the first female UDR soldier to be killed by enemy action. See: Attack on UDR Clogher barracks
- 13 May 1974: Eugene Martin (18) and Sean McKearney (19), both Catholic members of the IRA, were killed in a premature explosion, while planting a bomb at a petrol filling station at Donnydeade.
- 22 September 1974: A helicopter came under fire while flying along the Tyrone-Monaghan border and was forced to land in a field. An IRA statement claimed the 3rd Battalion of the East Tyrone Brigade was responsible.
- 7 November 1974: Two British soldiers, Vernon Rose (aged 30) and Charles Simpson (aged 35) were killed by an IRA booby trap bomb at an electricity sub station at Aghalarg, near Stewartstown, County Tyrone.
- 25 November 1975: two RUC officers, Samuel Clarke (aged 35) and Patrick Maxwell (aged 36), were killed when their mobile patrol was caught in an IRA sniper ambush in Clonavaddy, near Ballygawley.
- 7 February 1976: Two Protestant teenagers, Rachel and Robert McLernon (aged 18 and 16, respectively), were killed by an IRA booby-trap bomb, intended for members of the security forces, which had been hidden in an abandoned crashed car, Tyresson Road, Cookstown.
- 29 April 1976 – Edmund Stewart (31), Protestant off duty member of the Ulster Defence Regiment, and Stanley Arthurs (43), a Protestant civilian, were shot dead by the IRA at Arthurs’ farm at Dunamony.
- 2 June 1977: Three members of a RUC mobile patrol were shot dead by East Tyrone Brigade snipers near Ardboe.
- 3 December 1977: RUC car ambushed by IRA gunmen firing automatic weapons at Clover Hill Bridge on Benburb Road near Moy, County Tyrone. Firefight ensued and the assailants fled across fields.
- 26 February 1978: IRA Volunteer Paul Duffy was killed by the SAS in Coagh.
- 16 December 1979: William Beck (23), Keith Richards (22), Simon Evans (19) and Allan Ayrton (21), all members of the British Army, were killed in an IRA land mine attack on their mobile patrol at Ballygawley Road near Dungannon
- 21 January 1981: Sir Norman Stronge (86), Ulster Unionist Party member, and former Speaker at Stormont, and his son, James Stronge (48), an off-duty member of the Royal Ulster Constabulary reserve, both aristocratic Protestants, were shot dead by the Provisional Irish Republican Army at their mansion, Tynan Abbey, Tynan. A group of men in military style uniform forced their way into the abbey, a mansion in its own large grounds near the Border, sought out the father and son, and shot them. They then placed bombs and incendiary devices and set the mansion alight. It was destroyed by the fire. Sir Norman Stronge, one of the oldest people killed during The Troubles, had been Stormont MP for Mid-Armagh from 1938 to 1969, and Speaker of the House from 1945 until his retirement. James Stronge had taken over the Mid-Armagh seat in 1969 and held it until 1972. He had been a Unionist member of the NI Assembly from 1973 to 1974. Both father and son were members of Derryhaw Boyne Defenders Orange Lodge. The IRA claimed the Stronges had been targeted as "symbols of hated unionism" and "as a direct reprisal for a whole series of loyalist assassinations and murder attacks".
- 7 September 1981: two RUC officers (Mark Evans and Stuart Montgomery) were killed when their patrol vehicle struck an IRA landmine at Sessadonaghy, near Cappagh, County Tyrone.
- 13 July 1983: four UDR soldiers (Ronald Alexander, Thomas Harron, Oswell Neely, and John Roxborough) were killed in a land mine attack while on mobile patrol, near Ballygawley. See: Ballygawley land mine attack
- 12 November 1983: a RUC officer (Paul Clarke) was killed and several others were injured in an IRA mortar bomb attack on Carrickmore British Army/Royal Ulster Constabulary base.
- 4 December 1983: Colm McGirr (23) and Brian Campbell (19), both members of the East Tyrone Brigade, were shot dead by an undercover British Army soldier whilst approaching an arms dump in a field near Coalisland.
- 13 July 1984: IRA Volunteer Willie Price was killed by the SAS while carrying out an incendiary bomb attack on a factory in Ardboe.
- 7 December 1985: during an attack on the RUC barracks in Ballygawley, the IRA killed two RUC officers (Reserve Constable William Clements and Constable George Gilliland) and destroyed the barracks with a large bomb. IRA volunteers had been lying in wait outside the barracks and, as the officers left, two gunmen stepped out of concealed positions and shot both officers in the head from close range. Another IRA unit then directed heavy machine-gun fire at the front of the barracks, which provided cover for a bomb team to plant a 100 lb (45 kg) bomb inside. The bomb exploded ten minutes later, destroying the barracks. Three other RUC officers who were in the building fled through a back door. See: Attack on Ballygawley barracks
- 11 December 1985: the East Tyrone Brigade claimed responsibility for mortaring Tynan RUC base, County Armagh in which four RUC officers were injured and the base badly damaged.
- 11 August 1986: The East Tyrone Brigade destroyed the RUC base at The Birches near Portadown with a 200 lb bomb. Three civilians were injured in the attack. See: Attack on RUC Birches barracks
- 23 November 1986: six British soldiers were wounded after the Brigade launched seven mortars at a British Army barracks in Middletown, County Armagh just along the Armagh/Monaghan border.
- 26 January 1987: a senior UDR officer was killed outside his home on Coalisland Road, Dungannon. Major George Shaw, a 57-year-old father of two, worked full-time for the MOD and was a part-time soldier. Early in the morning as he prepared to drive to work, two masked IRA gunmen who had been hiding behind trees walked over and shot him three times in the head, mortally wounding him. Almost immediately another part-time soldier chanced upon the scene and opened fire on the fleeing gunmen who managed to escape by forcing a passing car to stop and raced off. Major Shaw died at the scene.
- 25 April 1987: an off duty British soldier (William Graham) was shot dead by the IRA at his family's farm, off Gortscraheen Road, near Pomeroy. This was the last action by the Brigade before Loughgall.

== Lynagh's strategy ==
In the 1980s, the IRA in East Tyrone and other areas close to the border, such as South Armagh, were following a Maoist military theory devised for Ireland by Jim Lynagh, a high-profile member of the IRA in East Tyrone (but a native of County Monaghan). The theory involved creating "no-go zones" that the British Army and Royal Ulster Constabulary (RUC) did not control and gradually expanding them. Lynagh's strategy was to start off with one area which the British military did not control, preferably a republican stronghold such as east Tyrone. The South Armagh area was considered to be a liberated zone already, since British troops and the RUC could not use the roads there for fear of roadside bombs and long-range harassing fire. Thus it was from there that the IRA East Tyrone Brigade attacks were launched, with most of them occurring in east Tyrone in areas close to south Armagh, which offered good escape routes. The first phase of Lynagh's plan to drive out the British security forces from east Tyrone involved destroying isolated rural police stations and then intimidating or killing any building contractors who were employed to rebuild them. Lynagh's plans met strong criticism from senior brigade member Kevin McKenna, who regarded the strategy as "too impractical, too ambitious, and not sustainable" according to journalist Ed Moloney. The IRA Northern Command, however, approved a scaled-down version of the strategy, aimed at hampering the repair and refurbishment of British security bases. Scottish-born journalist Kevin Toolis has written that from 1985 onward, the brigade led a five-year campaign that left 33 security facilities destroyed and nearly 100 seriously damaged. In July 1983, the East Tyrone Brigade carried out a landmine ambush on an Ulster Defence Regiment (UDR) mobile patrol near Ballygawley, killing three UDR soldiers (a fourth UDR soldier died later). In 1985 and 1986, the East Tyrone Brigade carried out two attacks on RUC bases in their operational area, described by author Mark Urban as "spectaculars". The first was an assault on Ballygawley base in December 1985. Two RUC officers were shot dead and the base was raked with gunfire before being destroyed by a bomb. The second was an attack on the part-time base at The Birches, County Armagh, in August 1986. The base was raked with gunfire and a JCB digger with a 200 lb (91 kg) bomb in its bucket was driven through the perimeter fence. The bomb detonated, destroying much of the base and damaging nearby buildings. In April 1987 the brigade shot and killed Harold Henry, one of the main building contractors to the security forces in Northern Ireland.

== Loughgall ambush ==
Mural commemorating those killed in the Loughgall Ambush

On 8 May 1987, at least eight members of the brigade launched another attack on the unmanned Loughgall RUC base. The IRA unit used the same tactics as it had done in The Birches attack. It destroyed a substantial part of the base with a 200 lb bomb and raked the building with gunfire. However, as their attack was underway, the IRA unit was ambushed by a Special Air Service (SAS) unit. The SAS shot dead eight IRA members and a civilian who had accidentally driven into the ambush. This was the IRA's greatest loss of life in a single incident since the days of the Anglo-Irish War (1919–1922). Six IRA members from a supporting unit managed to escape. The Volunteers killed at Loughgall were Declan Arthurs (21), Tony Gormley (24), Eugene Kelly (25), Pádraig McKearney (32), Jim Lynagh (31), Gerard O'Callaghan (28), Seamus Donnelly (19) and unit commander Patrick Joseph Kelly (30). The eight volunteers killed in the ambush became known as the "Loughgall Martyrs" among many republicans.

In December 2011, the Police Service of Northern Ireland (PSNI)'s Historical Enquiries Team found that not only did the IRA team fire first but that they could not have been safely arrested. They concluded that the SAS were justified in opening fire.

In 2012 a Gaelic Athletic Association (GAA) club in Tyrone distanced itself from a republican commemoration of those killed in the ambush. This was in response to a complaint from Democratic Unionist Party Assemblyman William McCrea accusing the GAA of turning a blind eye to "republican terrorist" events in the last years. GAA Central Council official reply was that "The GAA has strict protocols and rules in place regarding the use of property for Political purposes. (...) The Association is committed to a shared future based on tolerance for the different identities and cultural backgrounds of people who share this Community and this island."

== Subsequent brigade activity ==
=== In the aftermath of the Loughgall ambush ===
The SAS ambush had no noticeable long-term effect on the level of IRA activity in East Tyrone. The level of IRA activity in the area did not show any real decline in the aftermath: in the two years before the Loughgall ambush the IRA killed seven people in East Tyrone and North Armagh, and eleven in the two years following the ambush. Additionally, most of the attacks which took place in County Fermanagh during this period of the Troubles were also launched from south Tyrone and Monaghan. However, many of their remaining members were young and inexperienced and fell into further ambushes, leading to high casualties by the standards of the low intensity guerrilla conflict in Northern Ireland. Ed Moloney, Irish journalist and author of the Secret History of the IRA, states that the Provisional IRA East Tyrone Brigade lost 53 members killed in the Troubles, the highest of any rural Brigade area. Of these, 28 were killed between 1987 and 1992.

A major IRA attack in County Tyrone took place on 20 August 1988, barely a year after Loughall, which ended in the deaths of eight soldiers when a British Army bus was destroyed by a bomb at Curr Road, near Ballygawley. The soldiers were being transported from RAF Aldergrove to a military base near Omagh after returning from leave in England. This attack forced the British military to ferry their troops to and from East Tyrone by helicopter. On 30 August 1988, an SAS ambush killed IRA members Gerard Harte, Martin Harte and Brian Mullin as they tried to kill an off-duty Ulster Defence Regiment member near Carrickmore. According to author Nick Van der Bijl, British intelligence identified them as the perpetrators of the bombing of the military bus at Curr Road. Peter Taylor, instead, says that only Mullin was suspected, and that plans for the SAS operation were already underway at the time of the IRA roadside bomb attack. On 16 September 1989, a British sergeant of the Royal Corps of Signals (Kevin Froggett) was shot and killed by an IRA sniper while he was repairing a radio mast at Coalisland Army/RUC base.

According to journalist Ed Moloney, Michael "Pete" Ryan (himself killed with two other IRA volunteers on 3 June 1991), an alleged top Brigade member, was the commander of the IRA flying column that launched the attack on Derryard checkpoint in Fermanagh on 13 December 1989. British military sources reported that other IRA volunteers from East Tyrone were involved in the assault. The checkpoint was stormed using an improvised armoured truck and two British soldiers (James Houston and Michael Patterson) were killed in action. Journalist Ian Bruce claims that an unidentified Irishman who had served in the Parachute Regiment was the leader of the IRA unit, citing intelligence sources.

=== From 1990 to the 1994 IRA ceasefire ===
==== Operations against British security forces in east and south Tyrone ====
===== 1990–1992 =====
====== Main actions ======
On 11 February 1990 the brigade managed to shoot down a British Army Gazelle helicopter near Clogher by machine gun fire and wounding three soldiers, one of them seriously. The helicopter was hit between Clogher and Augher, over the border near Derrygorry, across the border. The Gazelle broke up during the subsequent crash-landing.

On 4 March 1990, ten IRA volunteers launched an assault on the RUC station at Stewartstown using an improvised flamethrower consisting of a manure-spreader towed by a tractor to spray 600 imperial gallons (2,700 L) of a petrol/diesel mix to set the base ablaze, and then opened up with rifles and an RPG-7 rocket launcher. The next day the IRA threatened any contractor who took on repair of the station.

On 24 March 1990, there was a gun battle between an IRA unit and undercover British forces in the main street of the village of Cappagh, County Tyrone, in which IRA members fired at a civilian-type car driven by security forces, according to Archie Hamilton, then Secretary of State for Defence. Hamilton stated that there were no security or civilian casualties. An Phoblacht claimed the IRA men thwarted an ambush and at least two SAS members were killed. A second shooting took place in the village of Pomeroy on 28 June, this time against British regular troops. One soldier was seriously wounded.

On 5 September 1990, an "engineering" IRA unit from the Tyrone Brigade, supported by armed militants, planted a massive car bomb outside the RUC barracks at Loughgall. A warning was delivered, and the device exploded after midnight, causing extensive damage to the base.

On 1 January 1991, a British Army checkpoint was fired on by an IRA unit at Aughnacloy. On 26 March, an IRA unit firing a light machine gun disrupted a UDR mobile checkpoint at Lurgylea road, north of Cappagh. No casualties were reported.

On 31 January 1992, an IRA van bomb blew up in downtown Dungannon, resulting in three people wounded and severe property damage to the city centre and to the RUC/Army base.

====== Last SAS ambushes ======
In October 1990, two IRA volunteers from the brigade (Dessie Grew and Martin McCaughey) were shot dead near Loughgall by SAS undercover members while allegedly collecting two rifles from an IRA arms dump.

On 3 June 1991, three IRA men, Lawrence McNally, Michael "Pete" Ryan, and Tony Doris, died in another SAS ambush at Coagh, where their car was riddled with gunfire. Ryan, according to Moloney, had led the mixed flying column under direct orders of top IRA Army Council member Thomas "Slab" Murphy two years before. The RUC stated the men were on their way to mount an ambush on Protestant workmen.

Another four IRA members were killed in an ambush in February 1992. The four, Peter Clancy, Kevin Barry O'Donnell, Sean O'Farrell and Patrick Vincent, were killed at Clonoe after an attack on the RUC station in Coalisland. O'Donnell had been released without charges for possession of weapons on two different occasions in the past. They had mounted a heavy DShK machine gun on the back of a stolen lorry, driven right to the RUC/British Army station and opened fire with tracer ammunition at the fortified base at point-blank range, no efforts were made to conceal the firing position or the machine gun. After the shooting they drove past the house of Tony Doris, the IRA man killed the previous year, where they fired more shots in the air and were heard to shout, "Up the 'RA, that's for Tony Doris". A support vehicle further compromised the getaway by flashing its emergency lights. Six attackers gathered on the same spot afterwards. The IRA men were intercepted by the SAS as they were trying to dump the lorry and escape in cars in the car park of Clonoe Roman Catholic church, whose roof was set on fire by Army flares. Two IRA men escaped from the scene, but the four named above were killed. One British soldier was wounded. Author Brendan O'Brien reports a witness claiming that some of the men were wounded and tried to surrender but were killed by the British soldiers. Patrick Vincent was shot in the cab of the lorry whilst Kevin Barry O'Donnell and Peter Clancy were shot just outside. Sean O'Farrell was wounded and attempted to escape. After being caught he was put up against a fence and killed.

According to a British intelligence officer, from then on, the brigade change tactics and resorted mostly to mortar attacks on security bases, while the British Army reinforced their patrols around the main urban centres in the county.

===== 1992–1994 =====
The Fintona RUC/Army base damaged by a "Barrack Buster" mortar, 27 December 1993

====== Main actions ======
In March 1992, members of the brigade destroyed McGowan's service station along the Ballygawley-Dungannon road with a 150 pounds (68 kg) bomb, on the basis that they were supplying British forces, while a soldier was wounded in the arms by a tripwire bomb at Flavour Royal, near Augher, and had to be airlifted.

A part-time RUC barracks at Fivemiletown, County Tyrone, in the operational area of the brigade, was destroyed by an IRA tractor-bomb on 7 May 1992, though the attack was claimed by the South Fermanagh Brigade. In the aftermath of the bombing, on 9 May, a sergeant mayor of the 1st Battalion, the Staffordshire Regiment was shot and killed by a soldier of his company in a blue-on-blue incident at the same spot, while taking part of a security detail around the devastated base. According to a later IRA's statement, the destruction of the security base forced the RUC and the British Army to organised their patrols from nearby RUC barracks at Clogher, allowing the East Tyrone Brigade to study their pattern and carry out a deadly ambush in December 1993.

Another IRA bomb attack on 12 May 1992, against British troops on patrol near Cappagh, in which a paratrooper lost both legs, triggered a series of clashes on that date between soldiers and local residents in the staunchly republican town of Coalisland, on 12 and 17 May 1992. The 12 May riots ended with the paratroopers' assault on three bars, where they injured seven civilians. Another street fracas five days later, on 17 May, between a King's Own Scottish Borderers platoon and a group of nationalist youths in Coalisland resulted in the theft of an army machine gun and a new confrontation with the paratroopers. Six paratroopers were charged with criminal damage in the aftermath, but were acquitted in 1993. Five were bound over.

At least two minor engagements occurred in the following weeks between members of the brigade and British Army foot patrols. On 22 June 1992, British troops exchange fire with snipers near Cookstown, while a British soldier from the Coldstream Guards was seriously wounded in Pomeroy when his patrol was fired on by an IRA unit on 2 August 1992. Another soldier in the same patrol had a narrow escape when a rifle round hit his gear. News reports claim that the IRA used an AK-74 rifle in the Pomeroy ambush. IRA volunteers from the Tyrone Brigade also carried out attacks with automatic weapons on the RUC barracks at Dungannon, on 21 June 1992 and on the British Army base at Omagh, on 7 December 1992.

The brigade was the first to use the Mark-15 Barrack-Buster mortar in an attack on 7 December 1992 against the RUC station in Ballygawley. The heavy mortar round, fired from a tractor near the town's health center, was deflected by a tree besides the barracks wall. Several people was evacuated, and the bomb disposal squad struggled 10 hours to defuse the device. A later IRA statement acknowledges that the mortar bomb had "failed to detonate properly".

On 19 January 1993 the brigade claimed that their volunteers uncovered and destroyed a British army observation post concealed in a derelict house in Drumcairne Forest, near Stewartstown. The same source reported that a British helicopter, a military ambulance and ground troops arrived to the scene shortly after, and that local residents believed that two soldiers had been wounded. Press reports at the time say that an abandoned house on Castlefarm Road was shattered by an explosion and subsequent fire, but that there were no security forces in the area when the device went off.

On 30 March 1993, one of the brigade units claimed they thwarted a British undercover operation by detonating an explosive device in the Glen, between Loughmacrory and Mountfield, near the spot where the British personnel were hidden. An RUC report confirms that a bomb exploded close to a combined RUC-British Army patrol in the area. According to them, a second 264 pounds (120 kg) device was defused in the follow-up operation.

From mid-1992 up to the 1994 cease fire, IRA units in east and south Tyrone carried out a dozen bomb and mortar attacks against RUC and military bases and assets. The facilities targeted by "Barrack Buster" mortars included the above-mentioned Ballygawley barracks, a British Army border outpost at Aughnacloy, the RUC barracks at Clogher and Beragh, both resulting in massive damage but no fatalities; two attacks on the RUC base in Caledon, which was also hit by gunfire in the second attack, and the RUC compounds at Dungannon, Fintona, Carrickmore, and Pomeroy.

A brigade statement claims that late on the evening of 26 April 1993, a "variation" of the Mark-15 was fired at a British Army position on an open field near the river Fury, a few miles east of Clogher. According to them, the explosion was heard from Augher to Fivemiletown, and there was a number of British casualties. A British Army report states that a 100 pounds (45 kg) device exploded beside an army patrol near County Bridge, a border crossing between Augher and Aughnacloy. On 30 April, a heavy horizontal mortar was fired at an RUC patrol vehicle near Ballygawley roundabout; the round missed its target and hit a wall.

The RUC security base at Caledon became the target of the "Barrack Busters" twice. On 11 May 1993, an IRA militant pretending to be a motorist that had been asked to show his licence at the barracks left a van carrying a mortar outside the facilities. The device landed unexploded inside the complex, resulting in its evacuation. The facilities came under attack once again on 7 November, when a supporting team armed with automatic weapons secured the area around the barracks, allowing an Isuzu Trooper carrying a "Barrack Buster" to be driven just outside the base. The support team sprayed the installations with a burst of gunfire, but the mortar overshot the compound, damaging an adjacent church. Fifty people were evacuated. Ulster Unionist Party councillor Jim Hamilton denounced that an IRA unit riding on a three-vehicle motorcade launched the attack after travelling three miles from beyond the Irish border.

On 6 June 1993, an IRA unit converted a stolen van in a "mobile mortar launcher" in the area of Pomeroy and slipped through British forces' surveillance to the RUC barracks at Carrickmore. According to the brigade report, the van, fitted with a Mark-15 mortar, was left besides a military sangar. The area was previously secured by a group of armed volunteers. The unit dispersed after setting on the mortar's timer. The projectile landed within the grounds of the base, causing some damage according to the RUC. The IRA asserts instead that the barracks were "extensively damaged". They also claimed that during the follow-up search, British Army technicians defused with a controlled explosion a 50 pounds (23 kg) mortar round, fired three years before.

An explosive device fired at the RUC barracks in Dungannon on 9 July 1993, that according to the IRA was a Mark-15 mortar bomb, prompted the evacuation of a nearby housing state.

Other operations against security facilities in this period included a sniper and small arms attack on the British Army base of Killymeal, Dungannon, on 22 May 1993; the brigade claimed a subsequent exchange of fire between IRA volunteers in supporting role and British soldiers crewing an observation post. RUC sources denied that the soldiers returned fire during the shooting. The fortified courthouse in Cookstown was meanwhile damaged by two bombs planted there on 15 October 1993, in an attack also directed to the adjoining British Army checkpoint. Dozens of residents were evacuated to a neighbouring church's hall. A joint RUC/British Army patrol was caught in the second blast, but no injuries were reported.

A major ambush occurred on 12 December 1993 in Fivemiletown, when an RUC mobile patrol received intense cross fire from a brigade's active unit on the town's main street, and two constables were slain. A second IRA rifle team fired at a British Army Lynx helicopter sending in reinforcements to the area over the surroundings of Fivemiletown. All the IRA members involved withdrew successfully.

On 21 February 1994, the brigade launched a mortar attack from a travelling van on the RUC barracks at Beragh. The base suffered "major structural damage", as well as most houses in the village.

On 9 April 1994, after a three-day IRA ceasefire, a Mark-15 mortar was launched at midday at the British Army permanent checkpoint in Aughnacloy. The heavy projectile landed at the rear of the small base without exploding, forcing the evacuation of Coronation Park housing state. According to other sources, the device actually exploded but caused little damage. The East Tyrone Brigade reported that they took over the area between the checkpoint and the border, set a roadblock, then drove a tractor carrying the mortar to the firing point and issued a 30-minute warning. On 27 May 1994, the British Army checkpoint at Aughnacloy was the target of an attack once again, when the compound came under automatic fire from an improvised tactical vehicle consisting of a Ford Transit van mounting a concealed heavy machine gun. British troops manning the outpost returned fire. The armed vehicle crossed the border after the engagement.

Sources from the brigade released a detailed statement on the attack on Pomeroy security base, carried out in the first hours of 26 June 1994, claiming that they had fired a single 220 pounds (100 kg) Mark-15 barrack-buster bomb. The unit, moving on two vehicles from the townland of Turnabarson, managed to snake into a heavy patrolled area to the firing point on Station Road and launched the shell by timer from a range of 70 yards (64 m). The British Army claimed that the mortar round exploded in a bog just outside the perimeter fence, while the IRA unit said that the bomb landed in the grounds of the barracks. No injuries were reported.

On 15 July 1994, an armed dump truck ambushed an RUC armoured mobile patrol at Killeshil, near Dungannon. Incidentally, the RUC vehicle was carrying in custody Pat Treanor, a Sinn Féin councillor from Clones, a border town in County Monaghan, Republic of Ireland. The RUC patrol returned fire. Three constables and Treanor were wounded, as well as a passing-by elderly female motorist whose car was hit by the RUC vehicle. The IRA unit managed to get away unscathed.

====== Botched operations ======
There were also a number of roadside bomb and mortar attacks thwarted by the security forces in east and south Tyrone in this period. A primed Mk-12 horizontal mortar was defused near Clogher on 9 April 1992 by British Army technicians, while a trailer carrying a 'barrack buster' was recovered by security forces and also defused in the same area on 16 January 1994. The IRA acknowledged that the attack "had to be abandoned due to heavy presence of crown forces in the area". On 30 July 1993, a 20 pounds (9.1 kg) device was uncovered by security forces in Pomeroy, and one man was arrested. The RUC claim that the machine gun stolen in Coalisland and other arms were recovered from a farmhouse near Cappagh on 29 May 1992. An IRA volunteer was arrested, while two other members of the IRA made good their escape. Nationalist politician Bernardette Devlin McAliskey suggested that the recovery of the machine gun was actually staged by the security forces as a publicity stunt. On 11 May 1993, British security forces found and defused a horizontal mortar complete with warhead in Dungannon. An IRA man was taken in custody in Newtownstewart, west Tyrone, on 10 July 1993, after being injured during a mishap while testing an improvised mortar in a barn near Dungannon whose firing pack exploded prematurely.

====== British casualties ======
Three active members of the security forces were killed by the East Tyrone Brigade during this period. Among them there were Constable Andrew Beacom and Reserve Constable Ernest Smith, the two RUC members ambushed and shot dead while driving a civilian type vehicle in Fivemiletown's main street on 12 December 1993. Another fatality was a Royal Irish Regiment (RIR) soldier, Private Christopher Wren, slain when off-duty by the blast of a booby-trap planted in his car. The device exploded while he was driving on Carrydarragh road, near Moneymore, County Londonderry, on 31 May 1993, just a few miles from Cookstown. A second soldier, Sergeant Dean Oliver, died in a fratricide incident in Fivemiletown on 9 May 1992, in the aftermath of an IRA bomb attack in the area, as mentioned above.

At least two British soldiers were severely wounded in action near Cappagh and Pomeroy in 1992.

==== Other attacks ====
On 17 January 1992, an IRA roadside bomb destroyed a van carrying 14 workers who had been re-building Lisanelly British Army base in Omagh. Eight were killed and the rest were badly wounded. The bombing was at Teebane Crossroads, near Cookstown. One of the workers killed, Robert Dunseath, was an off-duty Royal Irish Rangers soldier. Two of the wounded were also off-duty UDR soldiers. The IRA said that the workers were legitimate targets because they were "collaborating" with the "forces of occupation". As the men were all Protestants, many Protestants saw it as a sectarian attack. The UDA retaliated by shooting dead five Catholic male civilians inside a betting shop on the Ormeau Road, Belfast.

IRA volunteers in Tyrone were the target of an assassination campaign carried out by the loyalist paramilitaries of the Ulster Volunteer Force (UVF). The UVF killed 40 people in East Tyrone between 1988 and 1994. Of these, most were Catholics civilians with no known paramilitary connections but six were Provisional Irish Republican Army members. When the IRA responded by killing a retired UDR member, Leslie Dallas, and two elderly Protestants, Austin Nelson and Ernest Rankin at Coagh, on 7 March 1989, the UVF shot dead three IRA members and a Catholic civilian in a pub in Cappagh on 3 March 1991. The main target, Brian Arthurs, escaped injury. The IRA alleged that Dallas was a senior UVF member but this was denied by his family, the police, and the UVF. Both Lost Lives and the Sutton Index of Deaths (at CAIN) list him as a civilian. The IRA retaliated on 5 August 1991 by shooting and killing a former UDR soldier leaving his workplace along Altmore Road, Cappagh. On 11 January 1993 a former sergeant of the B-Specials (Matthew Boyd) was shot dead while driving his car along Donaghmore Road, Dungannon, County Tyrone. The IRA claimed the man was a UVF commander, responsible for the killings of Catholic civilians. This was denied by the dead man's family. CAIN lists Boyd as a Protestant civilian. A former UDR soldier (David Martin) was killed when an IRA bomb exploded underneath his car in Kildress, County Tyrone on 25 April 1993; it was claimed that he had loyalist connections. The latter attack led to loyalist allegations that the IRA was killing Protestant land-owners in Tyrone and Fermanagh in an orchestrated campaign to drive Protestants out of the region, to the point that they drew an analogy with contemporaneous ethnic cleansing in the Balkans. This is disputed by some authors as an "exaggeration".

A gun attack on the home of DUP politician Willie McCrea on 10 July 1994 at Magherafelt, County Londonderry, was attributed to members of the East Tyrone Brigade. Sources claim that the IRA leadership stood down the unit responsible.

=== List of actions from 1996 until the 1997 IRA ceasefire ===
There were a number of actions carried out by the IRA in the eastern part of Tyrone from 1996 up to the latest IRA ceasefire of July 1997:

- 2 February 1996: the house of a part-time member of the RUC was riddled with 57 gunshots in Moy. There were no casualties. A 'senior security source' claimed that the IRA was responsible, although the IRA later denied as "mischievous" any claims that it was involved in the incident.
- 5 February 1997: an IRA unit fired a horizontal mortar at an RUC patrol on Newell Road in Dungannon. There were no injuries.
- 10 February 1997: a horizontal mortar fired by an IRA unit hit an RUC armoured vehicle leaving a security base. The ambush took place outside the village of Pomeroy. One RUC officer was injured.
- 22 February 1997: an IRA mortar unit was intercepted by the RUC in Caledon, on its way to carry out an attack on a British security facility. A five-mile (8 km) chase followed before the IRA volunteers managed to escape on foot.
- 26 March 1997: a grenade was thrown by IRA volunteers at the British Army/RUC base in Coalisland. The device holed the perimeter fence. Undercover members of the British Army shot and seriously injured 19-year-old republican Gareth Doris in the aftermath. The soldiers left the scene under the protection of the RUC after being cornered by a crowd. Two women were wounded by plastic bullets fired by RUC officers. Doris recovered from his wounds and was sentenced to ten years in jail for involvement in the attack before being released in 2000 under the terms of the Good Friday Agreement.
- 5 July 1997: In Coalisland, a female RUC officer from Portadown was shot in the face by an IRA volunteer during an attack on an armoured vehicle beside the British Army/RUC base. Her wounds were said to be non life-threatening.
- 8 July 1997: A landmine was planted by the IRA near Dungannon, leading to a bomb alert. There were no casualties.
- 9 July 1997: IRA gunmen hijacked and burned a number of vehicles at Dungannon.

Róisín McAliskey, daughter of political activist Bernadette McAliskey and suspected IRA member from Coalisland was accused by German authorities of being involved in a mortar attack on British Army facilities in Osnabrück, Germany, on 28 June 1996. Her extradition from Northern Ireland was eventually denied in 2007 due to discrepancies in the claims against her.

The commander of the brigade, Kevin McKenna, was appointed Chief of Staff of the IRA in 1983. He would be the longest-serving volunteer in this position, right up to the 1997 ceasefire.

== See also ==
- Provisional Irish Republican Army campaign 1969–1997
- Provisional IRA South Armagh Brigade
- Provisional IRA Belfast Brigade
- Provisional IRA Derry Brigade

== Sources ==
- O'Brien, Brendan (1999). The Long War-the IRA and Sinn Féin. Syracuse University Press. ISBN 0-86278-606-1
- Moloney, Ed (2002). Secret History of the IRA. W. W. Norton and Company; ISBN 0-14-101041-X
- Urban, Mark (1992). Big Boys' Rules. Faber and Faber; ISBN 0-571-16112-X
- Ryder, Chris (2005). A Special Kind of Courage: 321 EOD Squadron – Battling the Bombers. Methuen; ISBN 0-413-77223-3
