= Derryloughan, County Tyrone =

Derryloughan
- townland
- Derryloughan shown within Northern Ireland Derryloughan (the United Kingdom)
- Coordinates: 54°31′05″N 6°36′32″W
- Sovereign state: United Kingdom
- Country: Northern Ireland
- County: County Tyrone
- Barony: Dungannon Middle
- Civil parish: Clonoe
- First recorded: 1609

Government
  - Council: Dungannon and South Tyrone Borough Council
  - Ward: Washing Bay

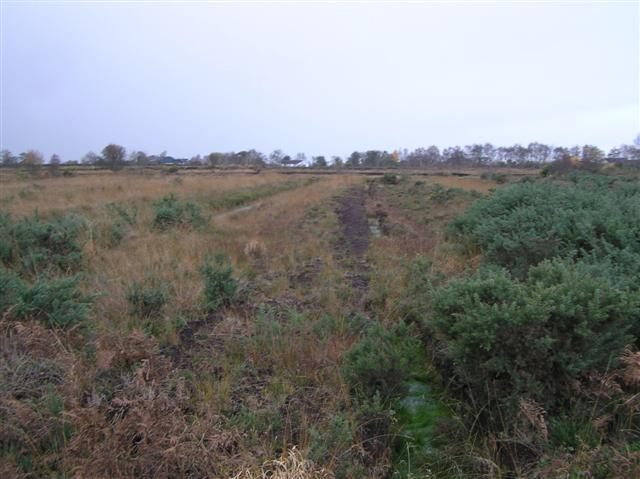
Derryloughan townland in 2006

Derryloughan is a townland in County Tyrone, Northern Ireland. It lies on the southwest corner of Lough Neagh, 4 miles from Coalisland. It is situated in the historic barony of Dungannon Middle and the civil parish of Clonoe and covers an area of 1751 acres.

The name derives from the Irish: Doire Lochain (Oak wood of the little lough).

== Geography ==
Derryloughan is mainly bogland, due to the overflow of Lough Neagh in the winter time and also due to heavy rain which lies in hollows in the ground. Along the shore of Lough Neagh and around the Washing Bay area has been designated an area of scientific interest. Once a rural farming and peat processing community this area now has a diverse population with engineering being one of the main employment sectors.

== History ==
Running beside the 'Moss' is the holy river. It is referred to as holy because Saint Bridget came and blessed the water. Many people have come for hundreds of years for a treatment for whatever illness they had. This continues to happen today but on a smaller scale.

== Population ==
The population of the townland declined during the 19th century:

Year	1841	1851	1861	1871	1881	1891
Population	600	511	536	538	539	489
Houses	105	85	96	98	92	97

== Sport ==
The local Gaelic Athletic Association club is Derrylaughan Kevin Barrys GAC. Many members of the Naomh Colum Cille Hurling club, which is based a couple of miles away on the Washing Bay Road also hail from Derryloughan.

== See also ==
- List of townlands of County Tyrone
