= Attack on Ballygawley barracks =

1985 IRA attack in Northern Ireland

Attack on Ballygawley RUC barracks
- Part of The Troubles
Date	7 December 1985
Location	Ballygawley, County Tyrone 54°27′43″N 7°1′37.25″W
Result	IRA victory: RUC barracks completely destroyed

Belligerents
Provisional IRA: East Tyrone Brigade	United Kingdom: RUC

Commanders and leaders
Patrick Joseph Kelly	

Strength
2 active service units	5 constables

Casualties and losses
None	2 killed 3 wounded

On 7 December 1985 the Provisional Irish Republican Army (IRA) attacked the Royal Ulster Constabulary (RUC) base at Ballygawley, County Tyrone. Two RUC officers were shot dead and the base was raked with gunfire before being destroyed by a bomb, which wounded a further three officers.

== Background ==
In 1985, Patrick Kelly became leader of the Provisional IRA East Tyrone Brigade. He, along with East Tyrone Brigade members Jim Lynagh and Pádraig McKearney, advocated using flying columns to destroy isolated British Army and RUC bases and stop them from being repaired. The goal was to create and hold "liberated zones" under IRA control that would be gradually enlarged. Although IRA Chief of Staff Kevin McKenna turned-down the flying column idea, IRA Northern Command approved the plan to destroy bases and prevent their repair. In that year alone there were 44 such attacks. Among the most devastating was the mortar attack on Newry RUC barracks in March.

== The attack ==
The attack involved two IRA active service units from the East Tyrone Brigade: an armed assault unit and a bomb unit. There were also several teams of IRA observers in the area. The assault team was armed with AK-47 and AR-15 rifles, while the bombing unit was to be responsible for planting and detonating a 100 pounds (45 kg) bomb. Both units were commanded by Patrick Kelly.

The assault was launched on Saturday 7 December at 18:55, when the handful of RUC officers manning the base were getting ready to hand over to the next shift. In the first burst of automatic fire, the two guards at the entrance were killed: Constable George Gilliland and Reserve Constable William Clements. Constable Clements' Ruger Speed-Six revolver was taken by the attackers. The base was then raked with gunfire. Another three RUC officers who were inside ran out to the back of the base, where they hoped the walls might offer some cover. IRA members went into the building and took documents and weapons. The bomb was placed inside and, upon detonation, destroyed the entire base. Three officers were hurt.

The republican IRIS Magazine (#11, October 1987) described the attack as follows:

One volunteer took up a position close to the front gate. Two RUC men opened the gate and the volunteer calmly stepped forward, shooting them both dead at point blank range. Volunteers firing AK-47 and Armalite rifles moved into the barracks, raking it with gunfire. Having secured the building they planted a 100 lb bomb inside. The bomb exploded, totally destroying the building after the volunteers had withdrawn to safety.

The first British Army unit to arrive at the base in the wake of the attack was X Company, 1st Battalion, Royal Regiment of Fusiliers.

== Aftermath ==
The attack was one of the Provisional IRA's biggest during this period. Twelve days later the same IRA brigade mortared the RUC station at Castlederg badly damaging the base and injuring four people. The Ballygawley base was rebuilt by the Royal Engineers in 1986.

The East Tyrone IRA launched two similar attacks in the following years: the successful attack on the Birches base in 1986, and the ill-fated attack on the Loughgall base in 1987, in which eight IRA members were killed. Ballygawley itself had seen conflict before with the Ballygawley land mine attack in 1983, and would see more violence in 1988 with the Ballygawley bus bombing, that cost the lives of eight British soldiers. The gun taken from Constable Clements was found by security forces after the SAS ambush at Loughgall.

The RUC base at Ballygawley was once again targeted by the East Tyrone Brigade on 7 December 1992, in what became the debut of the IRA's brand new Mark-15 improvised mortar, better known as "Barrack Buster". The mortar failed to go off. Another attack with a horizontal mortar occurred on 30 April 1993, when an RUC mobile patrol leaving Ballygawley compound was targeted. According to an IRA statement, the projectile missed one of the vehicles, hit a wall and exploded.

== See also ==
- Chronology of Provisional Irish Republican Army actions (1980–1989)
- Ballygawley bus bombing
- Clive Barracks bombing
- 1993 Fivemiletown ambush
- The Troubles in Ballygawley
