= Loughgall ambush =

1987 British ambush in Northern Ireland

- Part of the Troubles and Operation Banner
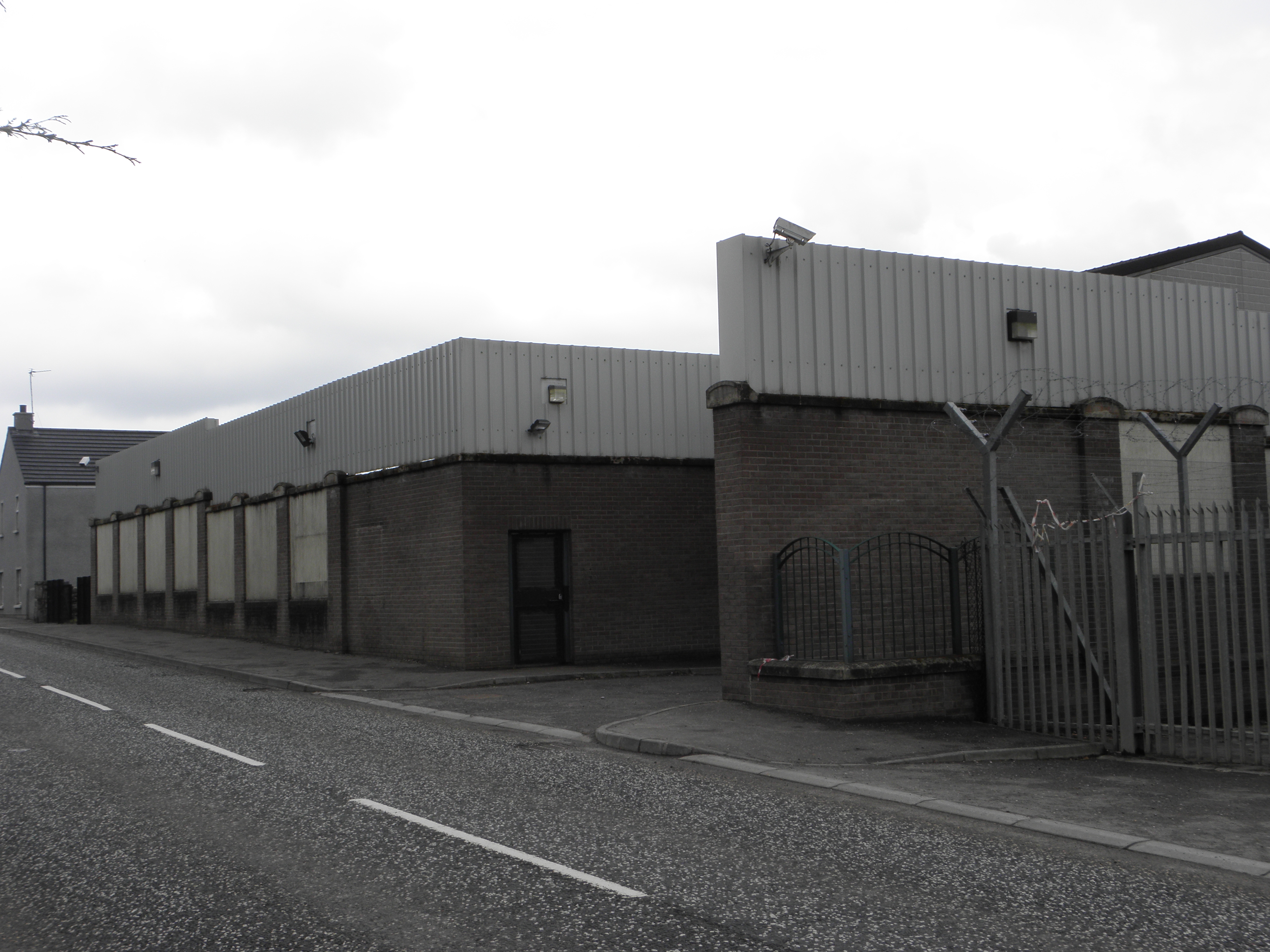
- The rebuilt Loughgall PSNI base in 2010, just before being sold to a development company
Date	8 May 1987
Location	Loughgall, County Armagh, Northern Ireland 54°24′27″N 6°36′40″W
Result	British victory

Belligerents
Provisional IRA: East Tyrone Brigade	United Kingdom: British Army; RUC

Commanders and leaders
Patrick Joseph Kelly †	Soldier A (Classified)

Strength
8 in attacking unit 4 in support	24 SAS soldiers 1 RUC uniformed officer 2 RUC HMSU officers

Casualties and losses
8 killed	1 soldier injured 2 constables injured
- 1 civilian killed and 1 wounded by SAS
- Location within Northern Ireland

On 8 May 1987, an eight-man unit of the Provisional Irish Republican Army (IRA) launched an attack on the Royal Ulster Constabulary (RUC) base in the village of Loughgall, County Armagh, Northern Ireland. An IRA member drove a digger with a bomb in its bucket through the perimeter fence, while the rest of the unit arrived in a van and fired on the building. The bomb exploded and destroyed almost half of the base. Soldiers from the British Army's Special Air Service (SAS) then returned fire both from within the base and from hidden positions around it in a pre-planned ambush, killing all of the attackers. Two of them were subsequently found to have been unarmed when they were killed.

A civilian was also killed and another wounded by the SAS after unwittingly driving into the ambush zone and being mistaken for IRA attackers.

The joint British Army/RUC operation was codenamed Operation Judy. It was the IRA's biggest loss of life in a single incident during the Troubles.

== Background and preparations ==
Mural commemorating the IRA members killed in the ambush

The IRA's East Tyrone Brigade was active mainly in eastern County Tyrone and neighbouring parts of County Armagh. By the mid-1980s it had become one of the IRA's most aggressive formations. Members of the unit, such as Jim Lynagh and Pádraig McKearney, advocated a strategy of destroying bases and preventing them from being rebuilt or repaired in an attempt to "deny ground" to British forces. In 1985, Patrick Joseph Kelly became its commander and began implementing the strategy. In 1985 and 1986, it carried out two major attacks on Royal Ulster Constabulary bases. The first was an attack on the RUC barracks in Ballygawley on 7 December 1985, in which two police officers were shot dead. The second was an attack on an RUC base at The Birches on 11 August 1986. In both attacks, the bases were raked with machine-gun fire and then severely damaged with homemade bombs. In the attack at The Birches, they had breached the base's perimeter fence with a digger that had a bomb in its bucket; it was planned to use the same tactic in an attack on the lightly manned Loughgall base.

The British security forces, however, had received intelligence weeks prior to the attack of the IRA's plan and at least 10 days before of the target. It has been alleged that the security forces had a double agent inside the IRA unit, and that he was killed by the SAS in the ambush. Other sources claim that the security forces had instead learned of the planned attack through other surveillance methods, such as a telephone tap. According to historian Richard English, information of the attack had not come from within the unit, though one member, Tony Gormley, was known to security forces as a well-paid Special Branch informant.

Three local RUC officers worked at the station, which was only open part-time, from 09:00 to 11:00, and from 17:00 to 19:00 daily. On the day of the attack, two RUC Headquarters Mobile Support Unit (HMSU) officers were placed in the station to accompany the local RUC officer who was to carry on the normal running of the station. The HMSU was the RUC's police tactical unit. Six SAS soldiers in plain clothes, including the commander, were positioned inside. Another eighteen SAS soldiers in uniform were hidden in five locations in wooded areas around the station. The men were armed with M16 and H&K G3 rifles and two L7A2 general-purpose machine guns.

The IRA's attack involved two teams. One team was to drive a digger with a bomb in its bucket through the base's perimeter fence and light the fuse. At the same time, another team would arrive in a van and open fire on the base, with the aim of killing the three RUC officers as they came off duty; the Pat Finucane Centre states that the intention was merely to bomb the barrracks. Both teams would then leave the area in the van. To avoid security checkpoints, the bomb was ferried by boat across Lough Neagh, from Ardboe to Maghery. The van and digger that would be used were hijacked in the hours leading up to the attack. The van, a blue Toyota HiAce, was stolen by masked men from a business in Dungannon. At about the same time, the unit's commander Jim Lynagh was spotted in the town, suggesting the van might be used in the attack. The digger (a backhoe loader) was taken from a farm at Lislasly Road, about two miles west of Loughgall. Two IRA members stayed at the farm to stop the owners from raising the alarm. Declan Arthurs drove the digger, while two others drove ahead of him in a scout car. The rest of the unit travelled in the van from another location, presumably also with a scout car. When a covert observation post monitoring the digger reported that it was being moved, the SAS took up its positions. Undercover Army 14 Intelligence Company soldiers drove around the backroads into Loughgall surveilling the unit.

== Ambush ==
The IRA unit arrived in Loughgall from the north-east shortly after 19:00, when the station was scheduled to close for the night. They were armed and wearing bulletproof vests, boilersuits, gloves and balaclavas. The digger drove past the police station, turned around and drove back again with the Toyota van carrying the main IRA assault party doing the same. Not seeing any activity in the station in their two slow passes of it, members of the IRA unit felt that something was amiss, and debated whether to continue, but decided to go ahead with the attack. Tony Gormley and Gerard O'Callaghan got out of the van and joined Declan Arthurs on the digger, according to journalist Peter Taylor, "literally riding shotgun", with weapons in one hand and a lighter in the other. At about 19:15 Arthurs drove the digger towards the station. In the front bucket was 300–400 lb (140–180 kg) of explosive inside an oil drum, partially hidden by rubble and wired to two 40-second fuses. The other five members of the unit followed in the van with Eugene Kelly driving, unit leader Patrick Kelly in the passenger seat, whilst in the rear were Lynagh, Pádraig McKearney, and Seamus Donnelly. The digger crashed through the light security fence and the fuses were lit. The van stopped a short distance ahead and, according to the British security forces, three of the team jumped out and fired on the building with automatic weapons. Author Raymond Monsignor Murray disputes this. According to Taylor, and co-corroborated by an ECHR judgement, Patrick Kelly jumped from the passenger seat and, followed by others, immediately opened fire on the building, either to encourage the rest to resolve the dispute about going ahead with the attack, or possibly because this was the way previous attacks had begun. At the same time, the bomb detonated, the blast destroying the digger and badly damaging the building. According to author Jonathan Trigg, the bomb in the bucket of the digger detonated several seconds after the SAS had opened fire. An ex-RUC Special Branch officer, John Shackles, described how the SAS had strung detonating cord along a line of fir trees opposite the police station, beyond a playing field. The detonating cord was exploded immediately prior to the SAS initiating the ambush, distracting the IRA team as the SAS members inside the station began firing.

Within seconds the SAS opened fire on the IRA attackers from the station and from hidden positions outside. There were 600 spent British cartridge cases recovered from the scene, with approximately 125 bullet holes in the bodywork of the van, while 78 spent cartridge cases were recovered that were fired from IRA weapons. All eight IRA members were killed in the hail of gunfire; all had multiple wounds to their bodies, including their heads. Declan Arthurs was shot in a lane-way opposite Loughgall F.C. premises; he was unarmed and holding a cigarette lighter in his right hand. Three of the IRA members were shot at close range as they lay either dead or wounded on the ground. Three other IRA members in the scout cars escaped from the scene, managing to pass through British Army and RUC check-points set up after the ambush had been sprung. The two HMSU officers were injured in the explosion with one suffering severe head injuries and the other a broken nose and were helped outside by the uniformed officer with no officer returning fire. An SAS soldier received a facial injury from glass after a window was broken by gunfire.

Two civilians, brothers Anthony and Oliver Hughes, were driving home in a white Citroën GS after repairing a lorry when they, driving behind the van, unwittingly drove into the ambush. Anthony was driving and Oliver, who was wearing blue coveralls similar to those worn by the IRA members, was sitting in the front passenger seat. Roughly 130 yards (120 m) from the police station, soldiers opened fire on their car from behind, killing Anthony and badly wounding Oliver. According to the soldiers, the Citroën reversed away slowly then zigzagged at high speed before stopping. Oliver denies that it reversed away at high speed. Oliver managed to get out of the car despite being warned not to move and was shot resulting in him falling to the ground. Two soldiers later gave him first aid. He had been shot 14 times. The Citroën had approximately 34 bullet holes. The villagers had not been informed of the operation and no attempt had been made to evacuate anyone or to seal off the ambush zone, as this might have alerted the IRA. A mother and her child took shelter in the church hall after their Ford Sierra's rear window was hit by a stray bullet 250 yards (230 m) from the station.

The security forces recovered eight IRA firearms from the scene: three H&K G3 rifles, one FN FAL rifle, two FN FNC rifles, a Franchi SPAS-12 shotgun and a Ruger Security-Six revolver. The RUC linked the weapons to seven known murders and twelve attempted murders in the Mid-Ulster region. The Ruger had been stolen from Reserve RUC officer William Clement, killed two years earlier in the IRA attack on Ballygawley RUC base. It was found that another of the guns had been used in the murder of Harold Henry, a builder employed by the British Army and RUC in facilities construction in Northern Ireland.

In 2017, declassified documents from the National Archives of Ireland revealed that the British government had ballistic tests which showed that the weapons recovered from the dead IRA volunteers had been used in forty to fifty killings, including every fatality in IRA attacks in the counties Fermanagh and Tyrone in 1987 before the ambush at Loughgall.

== Aftermath ==
Shortly after the ambush the Provisional IRA released a statement saying: "volunteers who shot their way out of the ambush and escaped saw other volunteers being shot on the ground after being captured".

The IRA members killed in the ambush became known as the "Loughgall Martyrs" among IRA supporters. The men's relatives considered their deaths to be part of a deliberate shoot-to-kill policy by the security forces. Thousands of people attended their funerals, the biggest republican funerals in Northern Ireland since those of the IRA hunger strikers of 1981. Gerry Adams, in his graveside oration, said that the British Government understood that it could buy off the government of the Republic of Ireland, which he described as the "shoneen clan" (that is, Anglophile), but added, "it does not understand the Jim Lynaghs, the Pádraig McKearneys or the Séamus McElwaines. It thinks it can defeat them. It never will."

The East Tyrone Brigade continued to be active until the last Provisional IRA ceasefire ten years later. SAS operations against the IRA also continued. The IRA set out to find the informer it believed to be among them, although it has been suggested that the informer, if there ever was one, had been killed in the ambush.

On 20 March 1989, RUC Chief Superintendent Harry Breen was shot dead in an IRA ambush near the Irish border together with RUC Superintendent Bob Buchanan. Breen had given a media briefing on the day of the Loughgall ambush at the scene and the following morning displayed the recovered IRA firearms to the media appearing on television and in newspapers. An Irish Tribunal of Inquiry by Judge Peter Smithwick into the deaths of the two senior RUC officers investigating Garda Síochána collusion with the IRA, concluded in 2013 that Breen was the target of the ambush to abduct and interrogate him on how the British security services had advance warning of the Loughgall ambush.

The IRA East Tyrone Brigade attacked the Loughgall RUC station again around 01:00 on 5 September 1990 with a 1000 lb van bomb outside the station. The unmanned station suffered extensive damage with no one injured as a warning was given. Earlier in the week, the date the Loughgall ambush inquest was to start, 24 September, had been announced. In April 1996, the RUC confirmed that the Loughgall police station was to be re-built later that year. The station was in use until its administrative closure in August 2009. In April 2011, it was sold for private development.

In August 2025, the former station was turned into a museum dedicated to the B-Specials. The Ulster Special Constabulary Museum unveiling had an opening ceremony and parade.

=== Legal proceedings ===
In September 1988, the Director of Public Prosecutions for Northern Ireland concluded "that the evidence did not warrant the prosecution of any person involved in the shootings". Six families of the IRA members and the family of Anthony Hughes commenced civil proceedings against the Ministry of Defence (MoD). In April 1991, the widow of Anthony Hughes settled out of court. In May 1995, an inquest commenced that was held over four days which concluded that all nine men had died from serious and multiple gunshot wounds. Lawyers representing six families of IRA members withdrew from the inquest on the second day of hearings as the Coroner would not provide copies of witness statements to enable them to prepare. SAS soldiers did not give evidence, with their statements read out.

In 2001, the European Court of Human Rights (ECHR) ruled that the eight IRA men and one civilian killed at Loughgall had their human rights violated by the failure of the British Government to conduct a proper investigation into their deaths, that was independent and transparent. The applicants, the next-of-kin, claimed that the deaths were an unlawful killing. In December 2011, Northern Ireland's Historical Enquiries Team found that not only did the IRA team fire first but that they could not have been safely arrested. They concluded that the British Army was justified in opening fire.

In January 2014, the High Court ordered that the families of the IRA members suing the MoD could widen their claim to include the RUC Chief Constable. The police later disclosed documents for the court case revealing that IRA members had been under military surveillance for weeks prior to the ambush. In March 2014, the Hughes family received an apology from the MoD for the death of Anthony and for injuring Oliver, stating that both men were "wholly innocent of any wrongdoing".

In September 2015, the Advocate General for Northern Ireland announced that a new inquest would be held. In September 2019, at a preliminary hearing the presiding coroner was told that the inquest may run for three to six months. In April 2020, lawyers acting on behalf of the families lodged a submission with the Committee of Ministers of the Council of Europe requesting an infringement proceeding in the ECHR for the 2001 judgement as the coroner had not fixed a hearing date for the inquest.

== In pop culture ==
"Loughgall Ambush" is the name of a republican ballad about the attack, recorded by Charlie and the Bhoys amongst others. The event was also mentioned in the song "Streets of Sorrow/Birmingham Six" by London Irish band The Pogues.

== See also ==
- Timeline of Provisional Irish Republican Army actions
- Ballygawley bus bombing
- Attack on Derryard checkpoint
- List of massacres in Ireland
- Coagh ambush
- Clonoe ambush
- 1993 Fivemiletown ambush
- 1997 Coalisland attack
