= Attack on UDR Clogher barracks =

1974 IRA attack in Northern Ireland

- Part of the Troubles and Operation Banner
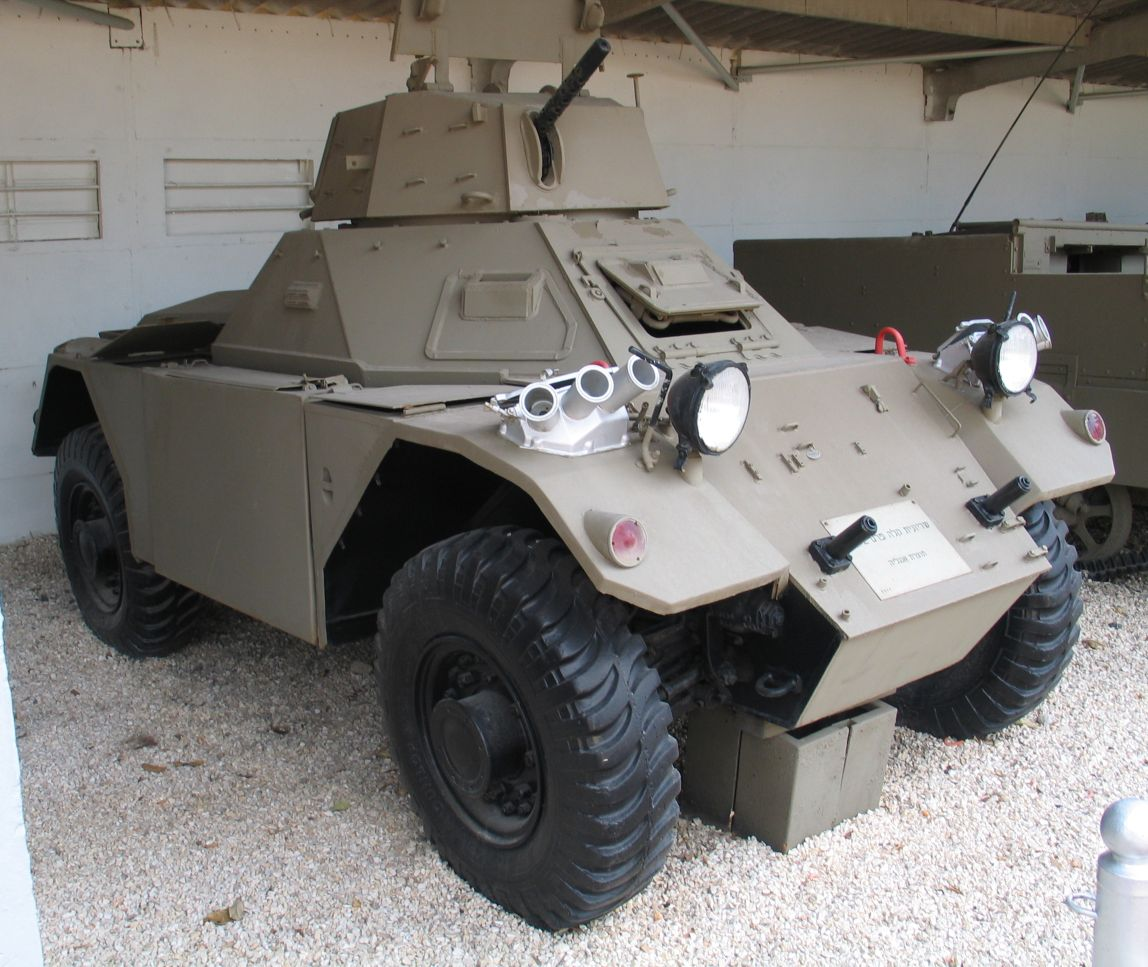
- Ferret armoured car
Date	2 May 1974
Location	The Deanery, near Clogher, County Tyrone 54°23′58.28″N 7°11′42″W
Result	IRA attack repelled; UDR barracks badly damaged; Successful IRA getaway

Belligerents
Provisional IRA: East Tyrone Brigade	United Kingdom: British Army

Commanders and leaders
Kevin McKenna	Harry Baxter

Strength
40 volunteers 9 hijacked vehicles improvised mortars	20 soldiers armoured personnel carriers

Casualties and losses
None	1 killed 1 wounded
- Location within Northern Ireland

On 2 May 1974 the Provisional Irish Republican Army (IRA) attacked a British Army base manned by the Ulster Defence Regiment (UDR) near the Northern Ireland–Republic of Ireland border at Clogher, County Tyrone. The IRA unit engaged the small base with automatic weapons, rockets and improvised mortars. Ferret armoured cars were deployed to the scene and a fierce firefight erupted. The IRA withdrew behind the border with the Republic. The assault on the outpost killed greenfinch Eva Martin and wounded another UDR soldier.

== Background ==
The situation at the political level in Northern Ireland by 1974 was tense. The new Assembly, established under the provisions of the Sunningdale agreement, was in the verge of collapse after the victory of anti-Faulkner Unionists in the February general elections. The month of May would witness the Ulster Workers' Council strike, what would mean the coup de grace to the deal.

On the security side, the IRA had stepped up their campaign by April, in the hope that their actions could bring the political compromise to an end. The UDR was put on selective call-out; 100 extra servicemen per battalion were deployed each day. On 10 April 1974 Lieutenant Colonel George Saunderson, a former second-in-command of the 4 UDR Battalion, was shot and killed by IRA members at the school of Teemore, Derrylin, County Fermanagh, where he worked as headmaster. Saunderson was shot ten times with an AK-47 automatic rifle.

On the same day as the Clogher attack, the Ulster Loyalist paramilitary group the Ulster Volunteer Force (UVF) blew up a pub in Belfast killing six Catholic civilians, 18 other people were seriously injured in the attack.

== IRA assault ==
At 11:10 pm of 2 May 1974, when a training night at UDR Deanery barracks, a Georgian building manned by the 6 UDR Battalion, was coming to its conclusion, a group of approximately 40 IRA members opened up with small arms, antitank rockets and improvised mortars from two firing positions. Most of the hostile fire came from a hill 800 yards to the north, while a secondary position targeted the base from the south. The attackers also deployed forward observers equipped with radios. Fire was returned from the part-time guard and from Ferret Armoured Cars belonging to 3 Troop, A Squadron, 1st Royal Tank Regiment armed with Browning .30 machine guns.

The IRA team struck the UDR outpost with two or three rocket propelled grenades and 15 mortar rounds, although little damage was done. One rocket passed through the base protective fence, landed in an open area and ricocheted upwards, exploding against the opposite fence. Another rocket hit a tree outside a window, and the outburst killed greenfinch Eva Martin, wounded by a metal fragment, and seriously injured a lieutenant on his legs, stomach and head. UDR full-time clerk Richard Martin, Eva's husband, witnessed her death. The blast also left the building without electrical power. Two other greenfinches took care of the operations room. Meanwhile, 4 and 8 UDR Battalion patrols arrived in the scene, mounting ambushes and deploying cut-off platoons on the roads leading to the border and alerting the Garda. The IRA covered their getaway by blocking roads using nine hijacked vehicles. The engagement lasted about 25 minutes according to IRA member and future supergrass Sean O'Callaghan.

== Aftermath ==
UDR patrols rounded up a Garand rifle and 27 improvised mortar shells in the surroundings of the Deanery the next morning. Two days later, a patrol from the 6 UDR Battalion thwarted a car bomb attack in Enniskillen.

Harry Baxter, 6 UDR Battalion commander, visited the barracks on the first hours of 3 May. He found the morale among the greenfinches high in spite of Martin's death. Eva Martin's body was buried at Lisbellaw Presbyterian Church, Lisbellaw, County Fermanagh. She was the first greenfinch and the first female soldier to be killed in action during the Troubles. The wounded lieutenant recovered from his injuries, but he left the regiment some time later.

== See also ==
- Attack on Derryard checkpoint
- Glenanne barracks bombing
