= Coagh ambush =

1991 SAS ambush in Northern Ireland

- Part of the Troubles and Operation Banner
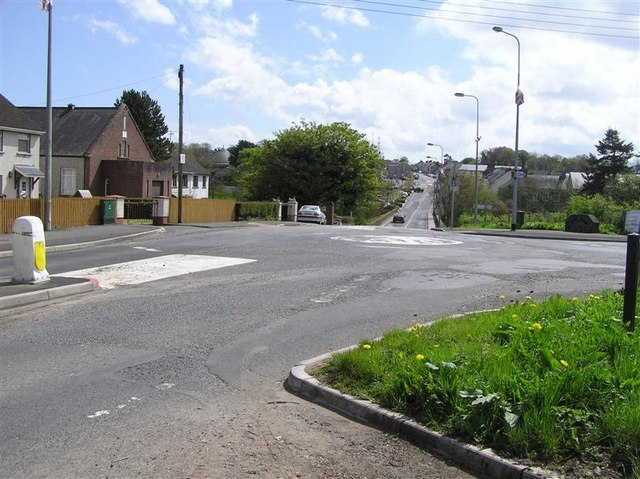
- Coagh as seen from County Londonderry
Date	3 June 1991
Location	Coagh, County Tyrone; Northern Ireland 54°38′49″N 6°37′03″W
Result	British victory

Belligerents
Provisional IRA	United Kingdom • British Army (SAS)

Strength
3 volunteers	8 soldiers

Casualties and losses
3 killed	None
- Location within Northern Ireland

The Coagh ambush was a military engagement that took place on 3 June 1991 in Coagh, County Tyrone, during The Troubles in Northern Ireland. A Provisional Irish Republican Army (IRA) active service unit from the East Tyrone Brigade, which had been en route to attack a part-time member of the Ulster Defence Regiment (UDR), was ambushed by the British Army's Special Air Service (SAS). The ambush resulted in the deaths of all three IRA men involved.

== Background ==
In May 1987, an eight-man unit of the Provisional IRA East Tyrone Brigade was ambushed and shot dead by the SAS during an attack by them on a Royal Ulster Constabulary (RUC) rural police station at the village of Loughgall, County Armagh. This was the IRA's greatest loss of life in a single incident during its campaign. Despite this major setback, IRA activity in East Tyrone didn't lessen in the following years.

In August 1988, the British Army shot dead another three IRA men who were stalking a part-time Ulster Defence Regiment soldier whilst he was off-duty near Carrickmore. British intelligence sources claimed the men were involved in the Ballygawley bus bombing, which killed eight British soldiers and injured 28, which resulted in the British Army changing its troop transportation methods in East Tyrone, switching from using unarmoured vehicular transport coaches on country roads, to ferry them in and out of its bases in the district using helicopters.

=== Tit-for-tat killings in East Tyrone ===
The series of killings which led to the Coagh ambush began on 26 April 1988, when a 23-year-old UDR soldier from Coagh, Edward Gibson, was shot dead by an IRA unit at Ardboe whilst at work for Cookstown Council on a bin lorry. Off-duty UDR soldiers, who tended to be Protestants, were common targets of the IRA in County Tyrone. These attacks fostered a perception among some in the Protestant community that the IRA was waging a sectarian war against them. The Ulster Volunteer Force (UVF) retaliated by killing Phelim McNally (brother of local Sinn Féin councillor Francie McNally) on 24 November 1988. This was followed by an IRA attack upon a car maintenance garage business owned by retired UDR soldier Leslie Dallas on 7 March 1989, in which Dallas, along with two civilian pensioners that were attending the premises at the time of the attack, were all murdered by machine-gun fire from a passing vehicle, the IRA attackers driving off afterwards cheering as reported by eye-witnesses in the vicinity. The IRA, announcing responsibility for the attack afterwards stated that Dallas was a member of the Ulster Volunteer Force. A subsequent RUC and coroner's inquest found that Dallas had no discernible links with the UVF; and local residents later stated that he had been targeted on the basis of his former service with the British Army, and the fact of his being a prominent member of the Orange Order in the town. In contrast, journalist Ed Moloney described Dallas as a UVF member and "leading member of one of the four UVF families in the East Tyrone-South Derry area." In 1977 Dallas and two other men, already on remand for a charge of intimidation linked to the loyalist strike the previous May, were charged with carrying a shotgun with intent to commit intimidation.

The tit-for-tat campaign around Coagh continued on 29 November 1989, when UVF gunmen attacked a pub owned by IRA member Liam Ryan, shooting Ryan dead; a patron at the premises was also killed in the incident. On 8 March 1990, part-time UDR soldier and construction worker Thomas Jamison was killed by the IRA in a gun and grenade ambush attack on a concrete mixer lorry he was driving near Donaghmore, whilst delivering concrete to a British Army base. Jamison was an employee of 'Henry Brothers', a building firm that had a contract with the British Government for constructing police and armed forces' installations. Harold Henry, one of the two brothers who owned the company, had been murdered by the IRA in 1987 in The Loup, County Londonderry.

On 3 March 1991, the Ulster Volunteer Force carried out an attack at the village of Cappagh, shooting dead three Provisional IRA members and a Catholic civilian at Boyle's Bar. The IRA subsequently stated its belief that this attack could have been carried out only with the connivance of the British state forces.

On 9 April 1991, the IRA's East Tyrone Brigade shot dead Derek Ferguson in Coagh (a cousin of local Member of Parliament Reverend William McCrea), stating afterwards that he was a paramilitary with the Ulster Volunteer Force. Ferguson's family denied that he had had anything to do with loyalist paramilitaries.

Historian Kevin Toolis includes as part of this cycle of violence the destruction of Glenanne UDR barracks in County Armagh, in which three soldiers were killed and 10 injured by an IRA truck bomb on 30 May 1991. The IRA later claimed the killings of three of its members that followed in Coagh was a retaliation by the British Army for the Glenanne bombing.

== Ambush preparations ==
In May 1991, RUC Special Branch received intelligence that the IRA were planning to assassinate a target in Coagh. The target was Allister Harkness, a kitchen factory worker and former part-time member of 8th Battalion, Ulster Defence Regiment, who was reportedly loathed by the local Catholic population for alleged bigotry and harassment.

The RUC first considered flooding the area with security forces in order to dissuade the IRA team from mounting the attack, but this was discounted on the basis it would only be postponed for another day. Instead, they settled for a hard arrest. On the evening of 29 May 1991, SAS soldiers carried out covert reconnaissance to assess their options. Positioning the arrest team in public toilets was deemed too risky, so it was decided to place them on standby behind the Hanover House Hotel, with a support group inserted opposite by the car park.

Informed about the plot on the 30 May after being called to Dungannon RUC station, Harkness kept to his usual routine while shadowed by an undercover policeman. His wife and children were temporarily relocated. Harkness was in the habit of parking his gold Austin Maestro in the car park opposite the Hanover House Hotel every morning at 7:30 am, and further intelligence reports indicated the morning of Monday 3 June was the likely time of the attack.

== The ambush ==
Rather than put the actual target at risk, an SAS soldier volunteered to act as a decoy, even going so far as to dye his hair a different colour and place padding around his upper body to mimic the actual target's physical appearance. He then armed himself with a Browning Hi-Power pistol and drove the target's Austin Maestro to the village of Coagh on 3 June 1991, arriving at the car park shortly before 7:30am. He then exited the car and sat on a wall beside the public toilets, pretending to read a newspaper while waiting to pick up a friend on their way to work. At around the same time the red Bedford lorry containing the cover group was parked across the road from the car park by a plain clothes SAS operator, who then went to the rear of the hotel to change into uniform and join the arrest team.

At 7.30 am, three IRA members – Tony Doris (21 years old), Pete Ryan (35) and Lawrence McNally (39) – drove a stolen Vauxhall Cavalier from Moneymore, County Londonderry to Coagh, crossing the border of counties Londonderry and Tyrone, to kill the part-time Ulster Defence Regiment soldier.

The stolen Vauxhall Cavalier was driven by Doris towards the centre of the village, and when SAS troopers on the first floor of the hotel spotted it approaching the car park in a low gear they alerted the other members of the group to "standby standby" over their tactical radios. The Vauxhall Cavalier suddenly stopped at the entrance of the car park and a man in the rear exited with what the SAS operators in the observation post recognized as a Romanian AKM rifle, which he then shouldered and pointed at the decoy sitting on the car park back wall. Upon seeing the AKM rifle being pointed at him, the decoy jumped over the back wall of the car park. Believing the decoy's life to be in immediate danger, the SAS soldier in charge gave the order "go go go" to instruct to the cover group to open fire and the arrest group to move immediately to the front of the hotel.

The cover group in the lorry then dropped down its sides and opened fire with H&K G3 rifles loaded with armour piercing ammunition from a distance of 10 feet to the Vauxhall Cavalier, with approximately 40 rounds being fired in a couple of seconds. The man with the AKM rifle jumped into the car and it sped off, at which point the SAS in the back of the lorry dismounted and continued to fire into the car as it drove up the street. Doris was immediately hit, and the out-of-control car crashed into two nearby parked cars 35 meters up the street. The arrest group arrived on scene and joined in shooting, which continued until the car exploded in flames and set one of the parked vehicles it had crashed into alight. According to an eyewitness, one of the IRA men in the car returned fire from within the vehicle after the crash. Some reports claim at least two of the IRA men attempted to exit the crashed car and were subsequently found lying half out of its doors by the later police investigation of the scene.

== Aftermath ==
RUC scenes of crime officers determined that the remains of Tony Doris was laying across the front seat of the burnt out vehicle, while those of Lawrence McNally and Michael Ryan were on the road by the passenger side of the car. Two AKM rifles were found beside the bodies of McNally and Ryan, while a bulletproof vest and spare AK mags were recovered from inside the crashed car. A total of 138 spent cartridge cases of 7.62×51mm NATO was recovered from the scene, all of which were fired by the SAS. Two spent cartridges of AKM type ammunition (7.62×39mm Soviet) were recovered, one of which was due to "cook off" when the Vauxhall Cavalier went on fire, which meant the IRA volunteers only managed to fire a single shot during the ambush. Both AKMs were set to fully automatic and had loaded magazines inserted, with a total of 136 unfired 7.62×39mm Soviet rounds recovered at the scene. The rifle found beside Ryan had a full magazine, while the rifle beside McNally’s body had been discharged deliberately.

Relatives of the IRA men subsequently stated that they had received information from the scene that two of the IRA attackers had fled on foot from the car after the crash, but had been pursued after and shot down by the British Army in the vicinity, with their bodies being taken back to the car, which was subsequently reported to be riddled with over 200 bullet holes. A Royal Ulster Constabulary crime-scene report stated that a balaclava belonging to one of the IRA men was found some distance away from the vehicle. The bodies of Doris, Ryan and McNally were badly burnt by the car fire, and had to be identified by police using their dental records. The two AKM rifles were recovered from the scene underwent subsequent police forensic examination, that revealed that they had both been used in the multiple murders at Leslie Dallas's garage (see above) in March 1989.

== Subsequent events ==
Local Democratic Unionist Party (DUP) politician William McCrea – cousin of Derek Ferguson, killed by the IRA on 9 April – declared that "(the IRA men involved) had fallen into the pit they planned for others.... Justice has now been done". Ian Paisley, leader of the DUP, welcomed the ambush and said "The time has come for a full war". Sinn Féin councillor Francie McNally – brother of Lawrence McNally – said the three men were "good soldiers ... executed by the British Crown forces". Sinn Féin criticised both the RUC and Gardaí for "delaying and harassing" the subsequent funerals of the three men, whose bodies were buried with IRA ceremony. Sinn Féin publicly denied RUC statements that the unit Doris, Ryan and McNally were a part of was engaged in an ethnic-sectarian campaign targeting Protestant workmen. Social Democratic and Labour Party MP Seamus Mallon warned that an "ethic of violence is eating into the soul of this community" and that he "hoped that every effort at arrest had been made".

A 2024 inquest determined that Tony Doris, Lawrence McNally, Michael Ryan had been lawfully killed by the SAS, as the use of lethal force was justified due to the soldiers having an honest belief that it was necessary in order to prevent loss of life. It was also determined that McNally and Ryan were both shot dead by a member of the arrest group known as "Soldier G", while Tony Doris was shot and killed by cover group member "Soldier B". It also emerged during the inquest that an SAS member known as "Soldier U" had recorded the entire incident from an unmarked surveillance van parked at the crossroads of Coagh Main Street and Hanover Square, however as the recording clearly showed the faces of SAS members it was decided to destroy it in case it fell into the wrong hands and compromised their identities.

== See also ==
- Clonoe ambush
- 1992 Coalisland riots
- 1993 Fivemiletown ambush
- 1997 Coalisland attack
- Chronology of Provisional Irish Republican Army actions (1990–1991)
- Provisional IRA East Tyrone Brigade
- The Troubles in Coagh
