= Kevin McKenna (Irish republican) =

Irish republican (1945–2019)

- Born: 25 June 1945 near Aughnacloy, County Tyrone, Northern Ireland
- Died: 25 June 2019 (aged 74)
- Allegiance: Provisional Irish Republican Army
- Rank: Chief of Staff
- Conflict: The Troubles

Kevin McKenna (Irish: Caoimhín Mac Cionnaith; 25 June 1945 – 25 June 2019) was an Irish republican and volunteer in the Tyrone Brigade and Chief of Staff of the Provisional Irish Republican Army (IRA). McKenna, a guarded, reclusive figure, was the longest-serving chief of staff of the IRA, serving from 1983 to 1997.

== Background ==
From Brantry, near Dungannon, County Tyrone, McKenna was born on 25 June 1945. From the mid-1970s, he lived in Smithborough, County Monaghan.

McKenna joined the IRA in the mid-1960s before he emigrated to Canada. After internment was introduced in Northern Ireland, McKenna returned to Ireland and again became involved in IRA forming a new active service unit (ASU) based in the Eglish and Aughnacloy areas. When McKenna returned from Canada, he had enough money to purchase a car, and this mobility, allied with the fact that he was single and committed, aided him in rising quickly through the ranks of his local IRA unit.

Following the departure of Brendan Hughes, no relation to the Belfast figure of the same name, McKenna became the commander of the Tyrone Brigade in 1972.

== Tenure as Chief of Staff ==
In September 1983, Beano Lean, the adjutant of the Belfast Brigade, became the latest in a string of informers against the IRA. Although Lean later withdrew his statement, it did cause the then chief of staff Ivor Bell to be briefly imprisoned. Under the rules of The Green Book, Bell automatically lost his rank and was replaced by McKenna, who at the time was seen as a strong supporter of Gerry Adams.

=== Tension with East Tyrone ASU ===
From early in McKenna's tenure as CoS, there were growing tensions between the Army Council and more militant East Tyrone Brigade. There had been underlying tension between McKenna and Pádraig McKearney since the 1983 Maze escape and this was exacerbated when McKenna turned down a plan by McKearney and Jim Lynagh to form flying columns. His credibility was undermined after the 1994 ceasefire and was subsequently replaced by Thomas "Slab" Murphy.
