= The Troubles in Ballygawley =

Incidents in Ballygawley, Northern Ireland during the Troubles

The Troubles in Ballygawley recounts incidents during The Troubles in Ballygawley, County Tyrone, Northern Ireland.

Incidents in Ballygawley during the Troubles resulting in two or more fatalities:

1975

- 25 November 1975 - two RUC officers, Samuel Clarke (aged 35) and Patrick Maxwell (aged 36), were killed when their mobile patrol was caught in an IRA sniper ambush in Clonavaddy, near Ballygawley, County Tyrone.

1983

- 13 July 1983 - Ronald Alexander (19), John Roxborough (19), Oswald Neely (20) and Thomas Harron (25), all Protestant members of the 6th Battalion Ulster Defence Regiment, were killed in a Provisional Irish Republican Army land mine attack on their mobile patrol on Ballymackilroy Hill, near Ballygawley. See Ballygawley land mine attack for more details.

1985

- 7 December 1985 - William Clements (52) and George Gilliland (34), both Protestant members of the Royal Ulster Constabulary, were shot dead during a Provisional Irish Republican Army gun attack on Ballygawley Royal Ulster Constabulary base. See Attack on Ballygawley barracks for more detail.

1988

- 20 August 1988 - Jayson Burfitt (19), Richard Greener (21), Mark Norsworthy (18), Stephen Wilkinson (18), Jason Winter (19), Blair Bishop (19), Alexander Lewis (18) and Peter Bullock (21), all members of the British Army, were killed in a Provisional Irish Republican Army land mine attack on their coach at Curr, near Ballygawley. See Ballygawley bus bombing for more detail.
