= The Green Book (IRA) =

Irish Republican Army training and induction manual

The Green Book is a training and induction manual issued by the Irish Republican Army to new volunteers. It was used by the post-Irish Civil War Irish Republican Army (IRA) and Cumann na mBan, ("League of Women"), along with later incarnations such as the Provisional IRA (IRA). It includes a statement of military objectives, tactics and conditions for military victory against the British government. This military victory was to be achieved as part of "the ongoing liberation of Ireland from foreign occupiers". The Green Book has acted as a manual of conduct and induction to the organisation since at least the 1950s.

== History ==
Because the IRA and later republican groupings have been identified as illegal organisations (the PIRA, IRA and Cumann na mBan have been proscribed – declared illegal – in the UK, the Republic of Ireland and a number of other countries) the Green Book has been distributed and published secretly. It is published at unknown printing presses and distributed to or shared with IRA volunteers as they are accepted for active duty. Due to this secrecy only two editions of the Green Book have so far been released into the public domain. The first, published in 1956, appears to be intact. The second, publication date unknown but dating to the 1977 detention of then IRA Chief of Staff Seamus Twomey, has only been released in three parts (referred to here as the 1977 edition). With the beginning of the latest IRA ceasefire and the 2005 ending of their campaign, it seems unlikely that a new edition of the manual will have been issued in recent years by the IRA. However, it is possible that known/unknown groupings have issued a more recent version.

== Volunteers' treatment of the Green Book ==
The Green Book is issued to IRA volunteers as part of their training and is considered a secret document which should not be revealed to, or discussed with non-IRA members. In order to protect the organisation, disclosure of its training material and any other training documents, including the Green Book, would most likely carry stiff penalties up to and including Court Martial. Once issued, each volunteer is expected to study and learn from their copy of the manual, to apply the rules given in it, and to apply lessons learnt from it. While the manual is clearly not all the training a volunteer could expect, it gave a broad overview meant to go some way to preparing the volunteer for active duty with the organisation.

== 1977 and 1956 editions ==
Both known issues of the Green Book were in existence while the IRA, (in the case of the 1956 edition), and the PIRA, (in the case of the 1977 edition), were engaged in a military campaign. In 1956, this was the Border Campaign, in the 1970s it was the guerrilla Provisional IRA campaign 1969–1997 which was carried out in Northern Ireland, England and several countries in mainland Europe.

Commonalities and differences exist between the two documents. This demonstrates that the Green Book is a living document updated periodically. These updates are made to reflect changes in:

- political policy and social structure
- military strategy and tactics of the organisation
- military strength of the organisation
- the technology/tactics of the organisation's enemies

While splits in the IRA since 1922 up to the 1950s do not appear to be noted in the 1956 document, developments in the fields of insurgency and counter-insurgency are. Both T. E. Lawrence and Field Marshal Sir William Slim are quoted. The 1977 edition appears to have been more heavily influenced by the work of Brigadier General Frank Kitson.

By the 1977 edition, the document had increased in scope, with length remaining around the same. Some doctrinal sections from the 1956 edition were still appearing, while new sections aimed at combating the counter-insurgency efforts of the British Army and RUC had appeared. Notably the 1977 edition would have existed alongside the IRA's change in tactics towards the entirely self-reliant cell structure. The 1956 edition on the other hand discusses the use of the IRA flying column – en masse attacks by large groups of volunteers against concentrations of the enemy. Another notable facet of the 1977 edition is the attention paid to the mental preparation of IRA Volunteers, this being the time of the IRA's "Long War" strategy. Readers of the 1977 edition are warned:

"The Army as an organisation claims and expects your total allegiance without reservation. It enters into every aspect of your life. It invades the privacy of your home life, it fragments your family and friends, in other words claims your total allegiance. All potential volunteers must realise that the threat of capture and of long jail sentences are a very real danger and a shadow which hangs over every volunteer..."

"Another important aspect all potential volunteers should think about is their ability to obey orders from a superior officer. All volunteers must obey orders issued to them by a superior officer regardless of whether they like the particular officer or not".

The 1956 edition contains no such warning, but appeals to the "guerrilla code." In 'Chapter Five – Organisation and Arms', the reader is advised:

"Leadership will not come so much by appointment as by the trust the guerrillas place in their commander. He must be worthy of that trust if he is to succeed. Instead of discipline of the regular army type there will be a more stern battle discipline: agreement on the job to be done, and the need to do it, and obedience to the guerrilla code, these take the place of the unthinking army type discipline. Breaches of the guerrilla code — desertion, betrayal, breach of confidence in any way — must be severely dealt with on the spot".

== Contents of the Green Book ==
The book contains information on:

- political philosophy of the IRA
- Irish history in terms of struggle against the occupation of Ireland
- the military objectives of the organisation
- the military strategy for guerrilla fighters
- the military equipment and tools that can be used by guerrilla fighters
- the military equipment and training for tools available to the IRA
- propaganda techniques within the theatre of operations
- interrogation techniques and how to resist them

The book has also included references to the training, development, and tactics employed by Regular & Irregular/Specialist forces in modern armies – particularly those of the British Army.

== Green Book historical context ==
The 1956 document couches the violence and occupation of the island of Ireland in a long history of armed resistance to occupation. The first chapter is entirely taken up with providing this history from the viewpoint of the organisation. It provides information on the Kerne, the battle of the Yellow Ford, Owen Roe O'Neill, the 1798 Rebellion and United Irishmen, James Fintan Lalor, and the "Tan War". All are described as being within the context of legitimate resistance to the occupation of Ireland. This discussion is largely romanticised and aimed at demonstrating a lineage of "armed struggle" from which the IRA assumes its legitimacy in the fight against "occupying forces in Ireland". One entry in this discussion is the fact that the efforts of IRA guerrillas were the direct cause in ending the British occupation of the 26 counties of Ireland—the territory that would become the Irish Free State, and later the Republic of Ireland. The 1956 manual also implies that the bulk of the IRA's work in "freeing Ireland from occupation" is over. This indicates both a "southern" perspective on Irish independence and an underestimation of the resistance they would encounter during the Border Campaign, that was aimed at the end of British rule in Northern Ireland. With the publication of the 1977 edition this assumption of an easy victory in ending partition had been dropped and the "Long War" strategy adopted.

The 1956 edition summarises the result of the violence during the 1919–1921 Irish War of Independence (referred to by republicans, who considered independence as having been only partially achieved, as the Tan War) with this passage:

"The hammer blows of the guerrillas destroyed the British administration. The guerrillas acted in small numbers in the right localities and compelled the British to disperse to find them. Then as the British searched, they hit them at will by means of the ambush. Communications were systematically destroyed and even the British army's transport system in the country was disorganised."

"The enemy's intelligence service was completely dislocated. The R.I.C. – the eyes and ears of British rule – was demoralised. British justice courts could not operate – for the people ignored them. The British gradually were forced to evacuate the smaller, more isolated garrisons. They concentrated in the larger towns. The areas evacuated came under sole control of The Republic. The next step was to isolate the larger centres and keep cutting communications and constantly hitting the enemy. In time these would have been evacuated too. Thus ended the last great phase of guerrilla operations against British rule in Ireland."

Compare to the Marxist interpretation in the 1977 edition, published during a new campaign and new conditions of waging war. The "struggle" is couched in more socio-economic terms, terms which would have made more sense to a generation living through unemployment and economic hardship in post industrial revolution Northern Ireland (referred to here as the "six counties"). It is also an indication of the influence of Marxist Philosophy that permeated the IRA in the late 1970s:

"The objective of the 800 years of oppression 'is economic exploitation with the unjustly partitioned 6 counties remaining Britain's directly controlled old-style colony' and the South under the 'continuing social, cultural and economic domination of London'. This last led to Irish savings being invested in England 'for a higher interest rate' and many hundreds of thousands of boys and girls from this country had to emigrate to England to seek the employment which those exported saving created."

"Another aspect of economic imperialism at work is the export of raw, unprocessed materials: live cattle on the hoof - mineral wealth, fish caught by foreign trawlers, etc. Further, from 1956 on, the Free State abandoned all attempts to secure an independent economy, and brought in foreign multi-national companies to create jobs instead of buying their skills and then sending them home gradually. Africanisation' is the word for this process elsewhere. Control of our affairs in all of Ireland lies more than ever since 1921 outside the hands of the Irish people. The logical outcome of all this was full immersion in the E.E.C. in the 1970s. The Republican Movement opposed this North and South in 1972 and 1975 and continues to do so. It is against such political economic power blocks East and West and military alliances such as NATO and the Warsaw Pact."

While the 1956 edition does not engage in any legitimisation of the struggle beyond the historical context of resistance to occupation, the 1977 edition does - claiming direct legitimacy from the members of the Second Dáil who transferred their authority to the IRA in 1938 after the takeover of the IRA Army Council by Seán Russell. This had always been the official ideology of the IRA, however after the split between the Provisional IRA and the Official IRA in 1969 it was probably deemed necessary to lay more of a claim to the historical struggle than the pre-split IRA had felt necessary. The 1956 edition would have also been published for use during a period when the failed S-Plan or Sabotage campaign was within living memory of younger IRA volunteers. Newer volunteers needed to be reminded of previous IRA activity in the "struggle for liberation":

"The moral position of the Irish Republican Army, its right to engage in warfare, is based on:

- (a) the right to resist foreign aggression;
- (b) the right to revolt against tyranny and oppression; and
- (c) the direct lineal succession with the Provisional Government of 1916, the first Dáil of 1919 and the second Dáil of 1921".

"In 1938, the seven surviving faithful Republican Deputies delegated executive powers to the Army Council of the I.R.A. per the 1921 resolution. In 1969, the sole surviving Deputy, Joseph Clarke, reaffirmed publicly that the then Provisional Army Council and its successors were the inheritors of the first and second Dáil as a Provisional Government."

In November 2003, during testimony to the Saville Inquiry on the events of Bloody Sunday, Martin McGuinness, the alleged former Chief of Staff of the IRA, denied that he had ever read such a book before reputedly leaving the IRA in 1974. McGuinness reportedly said: "When I was in the IRA there was no such book, I don't know when it came into existence." When asked what the phrase "green book" meant, he stated: "I think it means the book was green."

== The Guerrilla / The Volunteer ==
The 1977 edition of the Green Book is very much focused on the mental strength of the volunteer. The manual is eager to draw a clear distinction between volunteer and his enemy:

"A member of the I.R.A. is such by his own choice, his convictions being the only factor which compels him to volunteer, his objectives the political freedom and social and economic justice for his people. Apart from the few minutes in the career of the average Brit that he comes under attack, the Brit has no freedom or personal initiative. He is told when to sleep, where to sleep, when to get up, where to spend his free time etc."

In the 1977 edition, the term guerrilla is dropped in favour of "volunteer"; the new edition also stresses that this volunteer is part of a movement with common aims and objectives. From the PIRA's point of view, this would have been necessary to combating competing interpretations encountered in the community and the propaganda efforts of the enemy they faced:

"Before we go on the offensive politically or militarily we take the greatest defensive precautions possible to ensure success, e.g. we do not advocate a United Ireland without being able to justify our right to such a state as opposed to partition; we do not employ revolutionary violence as our means without being able to illustrate that we have no recourse to any other means. Or in more everyday simple terms: we do not claim that we are going to escalate the war if we cannot do just that; we do not mount an operation without first having ensured that we have taken the necessary defensive precautions of accurate intelligence, security, that weapons are in proper working order with proper ammunition and that the volunteers involved know how to handle interrogations in the event of their capture etc, and of course that the operation itself enhances rather than alienates our supporters."

The 1956 edition, conversely, stresses the physical aspects of IRA operations:

"Outside of the support he [the guerrilla] gets from the people among whom he operates – and this support must never be underestimated for it is vital to his eventual success – he fights alone. He is part of an independent formation that is in effect an army by itself. He must be self-contained. If necessary he must act alone and fight alone with the weapons at his disposal – and these very often will not be of the best. He must find his own supplies. His endurance has to be great: and for this he needs a fit body and an alert mind. Above all he must know what he is fighting for – and why."

== Military objectives in the Green Book ==
The 1977 edition describes the military objectives of the IRA as:

"The position of the Irish Republican Army since its foundation in 1916 has been one of sustained resistance and implacable hostility to the forces of imperialism, always keeping in the forefront of the most advanced revolutionary thinking and the latest guerrilla warfare techniques in the world."

The enemy is described as:

"The establishment is all those who have a vested interest in maintaining the present status quo in politicians, media, judiciary, certain business elements and the Brit war machine comprising, the Brit Army, the U.D.R., R.U.C. (r) [reserve], Screws, Civilian Searchers. The cure for these armed branches of the establishment is well known and documented. But with the possible exceptions of the Brit Ministers in the 'Northern Ireland Office' and certain members of the judiciary, the overtly unarmed branches of the establishment are not so clearly identifiable to the people as our enemies as say armed Brits or R.U.C."

The military objects of the IRA in 1977 are presented as closely tied to the political objectives of politicising the citizenry. Rather than the tactic of surgical strike, the tactic of continuous escalation or the strategy of what has been called the PIRA's Tet offensive is preferred:

"By now it is clear that our task is not only to kill as many enemy personnel as possible but of equal importance to create support which will carry us not only through a war of liberation which could last another decade but which will support us past the 'Brits Out' stage to the ultimate aim of a Democratic Socialist Republic."

"The Strategy is:

1. A war of attrition against enemy personnel which is aimed at causing as many casualties and deaths as possible so as to create a demand from their people at home for their withdrawal.
2. A bombing campaign aimed at making the enemy's financial interest in our country unprofitable while at the same time curbing long term financial investment in our country.
3. To make the Six Counties as at present and for the past several years ungovernable except by colonial military rule.
4. To sustain the war and gain support for its ends by National and International propaganda and publicity campaigns.
5. By defending the war of liberation by punishing criminals, collaborators and informers."

The 1956 edition stresses military objectives and barely mentions political objectives. It contains a lot of practical advice on operating as a guerrilla fighter and how to inflict damage on targets. No mention is made of the establishment of "a Democratic Socialist Republic". This can probably been seen in the context of the IRA keeping pace with social changes and the material aspirations of Irish men and women living within the Republic of Ireland and Northern Ireland. At the time of the Border Campaign the communities the IRA came to rely on were not politicised to the same degree as those in 1977. A lack of support within their host community is commonly given as the reason for the failure of the Border Campaign. This edition of the Green Book even goes so far as to announce the aim of restoring the Irish language as the national language, an aim not mentioned in the earlier edition.

== Military equipment in the Green Book ==
The 1977 edition of the Green Book makes little mention of arms and equipment available to the volunteer. The one entry that does appear deals only with the issue of tactics as affected by lack of weaponry:

"Tactics are dictated by the existing conditions. Here again the logic is quite simple. Without support Volunteers, Dumps, Weapons, Finance, etc., we cannot mount an operation, much less a campaign. In September 1969 the existing conditions dictated that the Brits were not to be shot, but after the Falls curfew all Brits were to the people acceptable targets. The existing conditions had been changed."

The 1956 edition goes into considerable detail on arms that the volunteer can expect to encounter and how to use them. Explosives are detailed alongside what the guerrilla should know about handling and preparing them. The sabotage techniques and weaponry available at the time had mostly ceased to be commonly used by the late 1970s, namely:

- Gelignite, 808, TNT, Ammonal, Wet gun cotton, Plastic, and 822.

Detonators are also detailed with physical descriptions, handling instructions, and burning rates. Detonators covered include: Cordtex and FID.

Small arms listed range from the revolver, to the shotgun and submachine gun up to the flame thrower, which was almost never used, except for an attack on British soldiers of the King's Own Scottish Borderers. It can be assumed that the use of these weapons, or at least supplies of them, had been diminished when the 1977 edition was published. Given that the organisation was having troubles with internal security, it may have also been considered a security risk for the IRA to detail its available weaponry too closely.

A generation earlier, IRA units operating during the S-Plan / Sabotage campaign did not have access to the above material, with the exception of Gelignite. IRA explosive devices of the 1930s and 1940s were prepared using materials such as Potassium chlorate, Carbide, Saxonite, Iron Oxide, Aluminium, sulfuric acid etc. By the time of the Northern Campaign (IRA) c. 1942, IRA Eastern Command, in cooperation with IRA Western Command could raise 12 tons of weapons and explosives at short notice. This was excluding the tons of weapons and explosives seized during the S-Plan campaign.

When the IRA split in the early 1970s into the Official IRA and Provisional IRA, they divided the arms held in IRA weapons dumps. The Provisional IRA obtained the majority of these weapons. For details on the types of arms recently decommissioned by the IRA as part of their permanent cessation of violence see the article on the Independent International Commission on Decommissioning and a breakdown of the PIRA's weapons before decommissioning took place in September 2005.

== Propaganda techniques in the Green Book ==
The 1977 edition stresses that the volunteer is ultimately responsible within the framework of the movement for ensuring the formulation, dissemination and efficiency of propaganda. This process was to begin within the mind of the volunteer himself:

"A new recruit's immediate obstacle is the removal of his (her) ignorance about how to handle weapons, military tactics, security, interrogations etc. An O.C.'s [Commanding Officer] might be how to put a unit on a military footing; an I.O.'s [Intelligence Officer] how to create an effective intelligence network; a Cumann na mBan Chairman's how best to mount a campaign on a given issue, e.g. H Blocks etc., and for all members of the movement regardless of which branch we belong to, to enhance our commitment to and participation in the struggle through gaining as comprehensive an understanding as possible of our present society and the proposed Republican alternative through self and group education."

The stated war objectives of the IRA within the 1977 document included the success of national and international propaganda as a war objective:

"We exploit these mistakes [mistakes by the British Army] by propagating the facts. So it was with their murderous mistakes of the Falls Road curfew, Bloody Sunday and internment, which were exploited to our advantage support- wise as was the murder of John Boyle in Dunloy."

The 1956 edition is a lot more practical, suggesting a more limited, less well oiled organisational machine of the IRA then than today:

"The main channels of information available to the guerrillas are newspapers, leaflets, radio, word of mouth. Other methods may be worked out and new ones invented. For example: Painting of slogans, proclamations and manifestoes and so on. All the means of winning the confidence of the people must be utilised. The ideas of the movement must be so popularised that no one is in doubt – least of all the enemy – that it will win eventually."

"This information service must function continuously to get maximum results. Among the things it must do are:

- Show weakness of enemy position and propaganda used to bolster that position.
- Show what is wrong with political and social order.
- Suggest remedies and how they can be brought about.
- Be in touch all the times with thinking of the people."

"The world must know and understand what is being done, what the enemy is trying to destroy and why, and the way these things can be ended and peace restored and freedom won. The use of regular bulletins for foreign newspapers and news-agencies becomes a necessity. The bulletin should be of the documentary type: no room for emotional pleas or the like. Just the facts."

While IRA volunteers also engaged in the above efforts, the techniques are not described in the 1977 Green Book.

== Interrogation techniques ==
The 1956 edition contains no details on how to react to internment, capture, interrogation, or interrogation techniques. This was no doubt an oversight on the part of the IRA, one which they came to regret with the successful interrogation of IRA volunteers captured by their enemies.

By 1977, with the launching of the IRA's campaign in Northern Ireland in 1969, the technical capabilities and anti-insurgency apparatus of the RUC, as well as the Regular and Specialist forces of the British Army had advanced. Coupled with this were technical advances in the intelligence gathering and interrogation techniques of those forces. The combination of these factors alongside political determination to capture and kill IRA forces and subdue the nationalist population of Northern Ireland led to changes in the Green Book.

Much more stress was placed on resisting interrogation in what has been called The Green Book II. If captured, the PIRA volunteer is warned to remain mentally implacable:

1. "The most important thing to bear in mind when arrested is that you are a volunteer of a revolutionary Army, that you have been captured by an enemy force, that your cause is a just one, that you are right and that the enemy is wrong and that as a soldier you have taken the chance expected of a soldier and that there is nothing to be ashamed of in being captured.
2. You must bear in mind that the treatment meted out to you is designed to break you and so bleed you of all the information you may have with regard to the organisation to which you belong.
3. They will attempt to intimidate you by sheer numbers and by brutality. Volunteers who may feel disappointed are entering the first dangerous threshold because the police will act upon this disappointment to the detriment of the volunteer and to the furtherment of their own ends. Volunteers must condition themselves that they can be arrested and if and when arrested they should expect the worse and be prepared for it."

A series of tactics employed by interrogators are listed along with the stages the interrogation process the volunteer should expect to go through: physical torture, subtle psychological torture, and humiliation.

The remainder of the document persists in a similar vein, constantly stressing the dangers of submitting to interrogation techniques. This highlights the increasing threat the PIRA realised interrogations were having against the organisation. Most likely this was a result of experience gained throughout the 1970s and during the Border Campaign when arrest and imprisonment of IRA/PIRA volunteers seriously impacted the operational effectiveness of the respective organizations.

== See also ==
- The Green Book (Muammar Gaddafi)

== Further Information/Sources ==
- A Handbook for Volunteers of the Irish Republican Army, issued by General Headquarters, 1956.
- Minimanual of the Urban Guerrilla by Carlos Marighella
