= Washing Bay =

Bay on Lough Neagh, Northern Ireland

Coordinates: 54.535°N 6.609°W

The Washing Bay is a small bay on the south-west corner of Lough Neagh, in County Tyrone, Northern Ireland. It is in the civil parish of Clonoe, the barony of Dungannon Middle, and the Mid Ulster District Council area.

== Sport ==
- Derrylaughan Kevin Barrys is the local Gaelic Athletic Association club.
