= IRIS Magazine =

- Summer 2007 edition focusing on Operation Harvest
- Editor: Mark Moloney
- Categories: News and current affairs; History; Irish republicanism
- Publisher: Parnell Publications
- First issue: April 1981; 45 years ago
- Final issue: c. 2012; 14 years ago
- Country: Ireland
- Based in: Belfast
- Language: English, Irish

IRIS was an English and Irish language magazine which focuses on Irish republicanism, Irish politics, current affairs, history and foreign affairs. The first issue of the magazine was published in 1981. Its headquarters was in Belfast. It ceased publication c. 2012.

== Name ==
IRIS was named after a republican weekly publication which existed between 1973 and 1980. IRIS is also the Irish language word for journal as well as being the initials of the Irish Republican Information Service.

== History ==
IRIS first appeared in April 1981 and its content focused heavily on The Troubles in Northern Ireland. The magazine was originally intended to be a quarterly news and current affairs publication aimed at foreign readership. The magazine faced considerable difficulties in first two years but appeared regularly between 1982 and 1993. Gerry Adams described the magazine as being "of central importance of discussion, debate and education to the ongoing development of the republican struggle". The magazine ceased publication in 1993 but was relaunched in 2005.

The Sinn Féin book shop continued to sell issues of IRIS until 2012, when it appears to have ceased publication.

== Editors ==
Former editors include:

- 1981–1993 - Unknown
- 2005–2006 - Jim Slaven
- 2006–2009 - Seán Mac Brádaigh
- 2009–2011 - Mícheál Mac Donncha
- 2011–2012 - Mark Moloney
