= Clonoe ambush =

1992 SAS ambush in Northern Ireland

- Part of the Troubles and Operation Banner
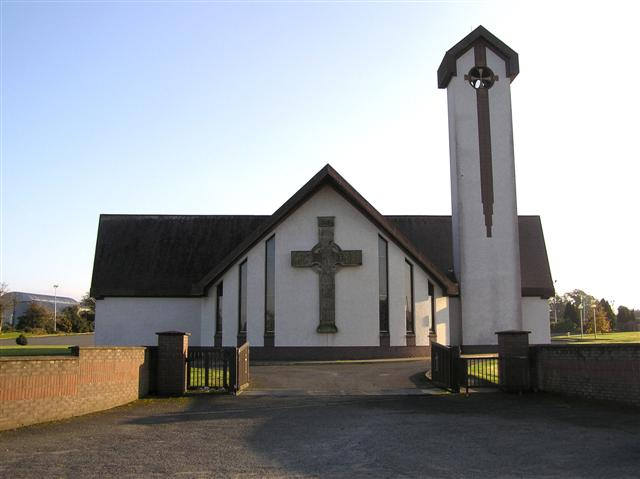
- St Patrick's Roman Catholic Church, Dernagh, near Clonoe
Date	16 February 1992
Location	Clonoe, County Tyrone; Northern Ireland 54°32′51.5″N 6°40′5″W
Result	Most of IRA unit killed

Belligerents
Provisional IRA	British Army
East Tyrone Brigade	Special Air Service

Strength
1 improvised tactical vehicle 6 IRA men At least another 4 involved	Unknown

Casualties and losses
4 killed	1 wounded
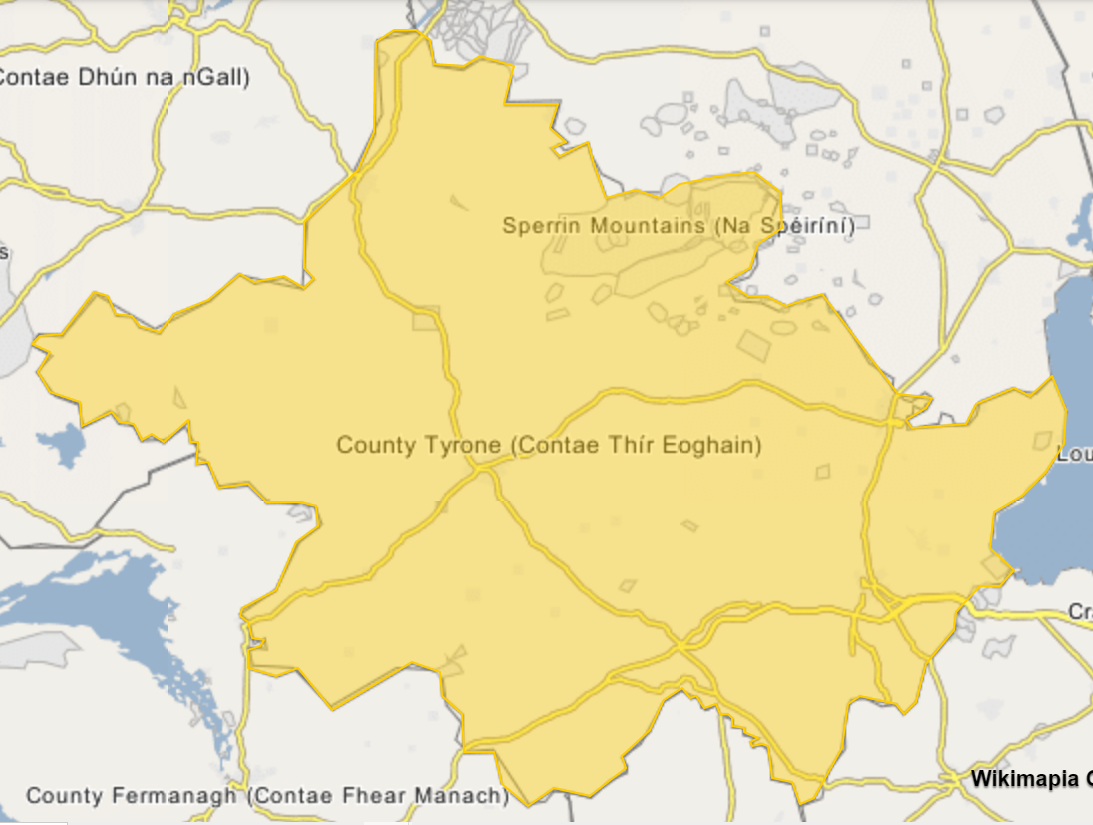
- Location within County Tyrone Clonoe ambush (Northern Ireland)

The Clonoe Ambush was a military engagement between the British Army and the Provisional Irish Republican Army (IRA) during The Troubles in Northern Ireland. On 16 February 1992, an IRA unit that had attacked the Royal Ulster Constabulary (RUC) base in Coalisland, County Tyrone, was ambushed shortly afterwards by the Special Air Service (SAS) in the grounds of a church in the nearby village of Clonoe, resulting in several IRA fatalities.

== Background ==
From 1985 onwards, the IRA in East Tyrone had been at the forefront of a campaign against British state police and army facilities and their personnel. In 1987, an East Tyrone IRA unit was ambushed with eight of its members being killed by the SAS while they were making an attack on a police station in Loughgall, County Armagh. This was the IRA's greatest loss of life in a single incident during The Troubles. Despite these losses, the IRA's campaign continued, with it attacking nearly 100 police and military facilities over the next five years, wrecking thirty three and damaging the remainder to varying degrees. The SAS ambush had no noticeable long-term effect on the level of IRA activity in East Tyrone. In the two years before the Loughgall ambush, the IRA killed seven people in East Tyrone and North Armagh, and eleven in the two years following the ambush.

Three other IRA members – Gerard Harte, Martin Harte and Brian Mullin – had been ambushed and killed by the SAS as they tried to kill an off-duty Ulster Defence Regiment soldier near Carrickmore, County Tyrone. British intelligence identified them as the perpetrators of the Ballygawley bus bombing, which killed eight British soldiers. After that bombing, all troops going on leave or returning from leave were ferried in and out of East Tyrone by helicopter. Another high-profile attack of the East Tyrone Brigade was carried out on 11 January 1990 near Augher, where a Gazelle helicopter was shot down.

On 3 June 1991, three IRA men, Lawrence McNally, Michael "Pete" Ryan and Tony Doris, were killed at the town of Coagh, when a stolen car they were driving in on their way to kill an off-duty Ulster Defence Regiment soldier was ambushed by the Special Air Service. Ryan was the same man who, according to Irish journalist and author Ed Moloney, had led an attack on Derryard checkpoint on the orders of IRA Army Council member 'Slab' Murphy two years earlier.

== Ambush preparations ==
On 15 February 1992, RUC Special Branch received information that the East Tyrone IRA were planning an imminent attack on Coalisland RUC station involving the use of a Soviet-made DShK heavy machine-gun and three AKM assault rifles. The following day, additional intelligence was gathered that the machine-gun to be used in the attack would be mounted on a stolen lorry, and that the active service unit would rendezvous at the car park of Clonoe Chapel to prepare and then return again after the attack to dismantle their weapons and escape to safe houses.

British Special Forces personnel thereafter performed covert reconnaissance of the Coalisland area in advance of planning an operation to arrest the IRA members involved in the forthcoming attack. They decided that due to the urban environment around the RUC station it was not feasible to thwart an attack on the building itself, as well as there being a high risk of civilian casualties in any ensuing gun battle. The use of roadblocks to stop the attackers vehicles was also discounted, as the route they would take was unknown to the authorities. The special forces ground commander eventually decided the best option was to attempt an arrest in the car park of Clonoe Chapel as the active service unit members were getting ready to attack the RUC station.

At around 7:30pm on the night of the attack, twelve British counter terrorist operators armed with Heckler & Koch G3 rifles and a FN MAG machine gun (both in 7.62mm NATO caliber) were posted behind a hedgerow at the southern boundary of the car park of Clonoe Chapel to await the arrival of the IRA members. Back up teams made up of special forces soldiers patrolling the area in unmarked cars were also deployed. At around 9pm, four masked and armed men hijacked a Ford Cargo tipper lorry in Coalisland, and warned its owner not to report the theft to the police until after 11pm. The British soldiers observed a number of vehicles, including a Vauxhall Cavalier, entering and exiting the car park at various times, then heard automatic gun fire coming from the direction of Coalisland and seen tracer bullets in the sky.

== The ambush ==
At 10:30pm during the night of 16 February 1992, a stolen car and lorry carrying multiple IRA attackers drove into the centre of the village of Coalisland and, pulling up at its fortified Royal Ulster Constabulary security base, fired 30 rounds of 12.7mm caliber armour-piercing tracer ammunition into it at close range from a DShK heavy machine-gun that they had mounted on the back of the lorry. The heavy machine gun was fired by IRA member Kevin O'Donnell, the rest of the unit being armed with Romanian AKM assault rifles, one of whom also fired 30 rounds at the barracks. The IRA attackers then drove off at speed up Annagher hill, without any apparent pursuit from the security forces. Whilst making their escape they drove past the home of Tony Doris, an IRA man who had been killed by the British Army the previous year, where they stopped to fire into the air, shouting: "Up the 'RA, that's for Tony Doris!". Witnesses also reported the IRA men waving Irish Tricolours from the back of the lorry.

After this they drove on at speed to the car park of St. Patrick's Roman Catholic Church in the village of Clonoe, two miles away from Coalisland police station, arriving at 10:45pm, where getaway cars were waiting. Immediately on arrival, the IRA attackers were in the process of preparing to abandon the attack vehicles and dismounting the DShk to take with them when they were assailed by a British Army detachment that had been lying in wait for them in the car park's perimeter, primarily composed of soldiers from the Special Air Service, who engaged them with sustained automatic fire. The soldiers would later claim that the headlights of the getaway vehicles had illuminated them behind the hedgerow, and since they had no hard cover to protect them from the heavy machine-gun they had no choice but to engage the IRA team without first shouting a warning or attempting to arrest them. After first laying down a volley of suppressive fire from behind the hedge, the twelve British operators advanced forward in pairs into the carpark towards the lorry, employing a bounding overwatch method of fire and maneuver to cover each other. Approximately 570 rounds were fired by British special forces during the ambush, with zero rounds being fired in return by the IRA members.

Patrick Vincent (20), the driver of the stolen lorry, was shot dead with five bullets whilst still in its cab. Peter Clancy (19) (hit by ten bullets) and Kevin O'Donnell (21) (shot twice) were killed whilst dismounting the DShk on the back of the lorry. Sean O'Farrell (23) was pursued on foot across the church grounds over a distance of 100 yards before being shot dead with five bullets whilst trying to clamber over a fence. Two other IRA men, one of them being Aidan McKeever, who were found sitting in a car in the car park with the intention of acting as getaway drivers, surrendered after being wounded and were taken prisoner. The roof of the church caught fire after a fuel storage tank was hit by a stray round, according to some versions or by flares, according to others. One British soldier was wounded during the confrontation. An IRA statement reported that another active service unit made up of at least four volunteers taking part in the operation at Coalisland "escaped unharmed".

Several witnesses to the ambush later claimed that some of the IRA men tried to surrender to the British Army engaging unit during the ambush, but were summarily executed. Mr Justice Treacy of Northern Ireland's High Court awarded McKeever, the IRA getaway driver, £75,000 in damages in 2011.

=== Internal IRA criticism ===
A local IRA source pointed out areas of incompetence in the attack by the IRA unit involved that led to its destruction:

- The use of a long-range weapon for a short-range shooting. The DShK could be used up to 2,000 metres from the target, and its armour-piercing capabilities at 1,500 metres are still considerable.
- The use of tracer rounds was ill-judged as they easily reveal the firing location of the gun if it is not being fired from a well-hidden position.
- The escape route was chosen at random, with the machine-gun in full sight and the support vehicle flashing its hazard lights.
- The gathering of so many men at the same place after such an attack was another factor in the failure to escape for most of the attacking force.

== Aftermath ==
Crime scene investigators from the Northern Ireland Forensic Science Laboratory examined the scene of the ambush and the route leading to it from the RUC base in Coalisland. A total of 51 spent 7.62mm Soviet cartridge cases (from the AKM rifles) were recovered: 30 from outside the RUC station, 6 from along Annagher Road, and 15 from the bed of the lorry's trailer. An AKM rifle recovered from the lorry had an empty magazine and was unloaded. The other two AKM rifles had a full magazine each and a round in the chamber. All of the AKM rifles had their safety catches set to 'SAFE'. The DShK had 17 live rounds remaining in a link belt, had no round in the chamber and its safety catch was also set to 'SAFE'.

During the funeral services for O'Donnell and O'Farrell in Coalisland, the parish priest criticised the security forces for what happened at Clonoe church, which had resulted in the deaths of the four IRA men. The priest, Fr. MacLarnon, then appealed to the IRA and Sinn Féin to replace "the politics of confrontation with the politics of cooperation". While Francis Molloy, a local Sinn Féin councillor, walked out of the church in protest, leading Sinn Féin politicians Gerry Adams and Martin McGuinness remained in their seats. Due to the Royal Ulster Constabulary having changed its policy regarding Republican funerals after the Milltown Cemetery attack, there were hundreds of RUC officers in full riot gear outside the churches before, during and after the funerals of the four men. This show of force was criticised by Sinn Féin.

This was the last occasion that IRA members were killed in a series of ambushes by the British Army, spearheaded by the Special Air Service, in Northern Ireland. From that point forward, the East Tyrone Brigade, according to a British intelligence officer, shifted to primarily using mortar attacks on security bases. The British Army reacted by increasing patrols in the main urban areas of the region. Growing tension between locals and the British military foot-patrols led to street confrontations with soldiers from the Parachute Regiment three months later.

=== 2025 inquest ===
In 2025, Mr Justice Humphreys of Northern Ireland's High Court ruled that the lethal force used in Clonoe by the British Army was unjustified. He criticised the operation, saying it was not planned and controlled in a way to minimise the need to use lethal force, and that the soldiers' claims that the Provisional IRA members opened fire in the car park were "demonstrably untrue". The ruling was criticised by DUP leader Gavin Robinson.

No evidence was found of any of the IRA weapons having been fired while in the chapel car park. The bodies of O'Donnell, Clancy and O'Farrell all had gunshot wounds to the head, which were later determined due to the bullet trajectories to have been inflicted when the men were laying incapacitated on the ground. Ballistics evidence proved that the three men had all been first shot in the back while attempting to escape. Likewise, Vincent was determined to have been lying down incapacitated in a horizontal position in the cab of the lorry when he was killed.

== See also ==
- Chronology of Provisional Irish Republican Army actions (1990–1999)
