= Jim Lynagh =

IRA member (1956–1987)

- Séamus Ó Laighnigh
- Lynagh mugshot (1973)

Monaghan Urban District Councillor
- In office 1979–1987

Personal details
- Born: James Lynagh; 13 April 1956 Monaghan, County Monaghan, Ireland
- Died: 8 May 1987 (aged 31) Loughgall, County Armagh, Northern Ireland
- Resting place: St Joseph's Cemetery, Monaghan
- Party: Sinn Féin
- Nickname: "The Executioner"

Military service
- Paramilitary: Provisional IRA
- Rank: Officer Commanding
- Unit: East Tyrone Brigade
- Battles/wars: The Troubles

James Lynagh (Irish: Séamus Ó Laighnigh; 13 April 1956 – 8 May 1987) was a member of the East Tyrone Brigade of the Provisional Irish Republican Army (IRA), from Monaghan Town in the Republic of Ireland, who was killed by British special forces whilst attacking an R.U.C. station in North Armagh.

== Background ==
One of twelve children, Lynagh was born and raised on the Tully Estate, a housing estate in the townland of Killygowan on the southern edge of Monaghan Town, County Monaghan, in the Republic of Ireland. He joined the Provisional Irish Republican Army (IRA) in the early 1970s. In December 1973 he was badly injured in a premature bomb explosion, arrested, and spent five years in the Maze Prison. While imprisoned, he studied and became a great admirer of Mao Zedong. After his release from prison in 1979 Lynagh was elected as a Sinn Féin councillor for Monaghan Urban District Council, and held this position when he was killed. At the time of his death, Lynagh had been living in a flat on Dublin Street in Monaghan Town.

== East Tyrone Brigade ==
After his release from prison Lynagh became active in the IRA again, active with the East Tyrone Brigade.He quickly became a unit commander and gradually built up his ruthless reputation. In early 1980, Lynagh (along with Aiden McGurk and Laurence McNally) became one of the first people to be charged with murder under the Criminal Law Jurisdiction Act 1976 in relation to the assassination of a former Ulster Defence Regiment member near Tynan, however judges at Dublin's Special Criminal Court later ruled that the authorities had failed to establish prima facie evidence against the accused and acquitted them of all charges.

After a series of Ulster loyalist attacks against Irish nationalist politicians in late 1980 and early 1981, Lynagh was suspected of involvement in an attack on the Stronge estate near Middletown in County Armagh, where the IRA killed the retired Ulster Unionist Party Stormont speaker, Sir Norman Stronge, and his son James, a Royal Ulster Constabulary (RUC) officer, before burning down their home, Tynan Abbey, and shooting their way out through a police cordon.

Lynagh was known as "The Executioner" by the Royal Ulster Constabulary. He was arrested and interrogated many times by the Garda Síochána in County Monaghan but was never charged. During this period he devised a Maoist military strategy, aimed at escalating the war against the British state in Northern Ireland. The plan envisaged the destruction of police stations and British Army military bases in parts of Northern Ireland to create "liberated" areas that would be thereby rendered under the domination of the IRA. In 1984 he started co-operating with Pádraig McKearney who shared his views. The strategy began materialising with the destruction of an RUC police station in Ballygawley in December 1985 which killed two police officers, and in the attack on RUC Birches barracks in August 1986.

== Death ==
Lynagh was killed by the British Army's Special Air Service on 8 May 1987 during an attack on the isolated rural part-time police station at the small Armagh village of Loughgall, the third such attack that he had taken part in. During the incident the IRA detonated a 200 lb bomb, and attacked the station with automatic weapons, and in the process were ambushed by the British Army which was lying in wait for them, having been forewarned of the IRA operation. All eight of the IRA attacking force were killed in the exchange of fire, the British forces involved incurring no fatalities. The incident subsequently became known as the Loughgall ambush.

Lynagh was buried at St Joseph's Cemetery (Latlurcan Cemetery) in Monaghan Town. During his funeral, as his coffin was carried through the village of Emyvale, Irish Garda Síochána officers were attacked by the crowd of mourners after they pursued three masked members of the colour party who had fired a volley of shots from H&K G3 rifles over his coffin.

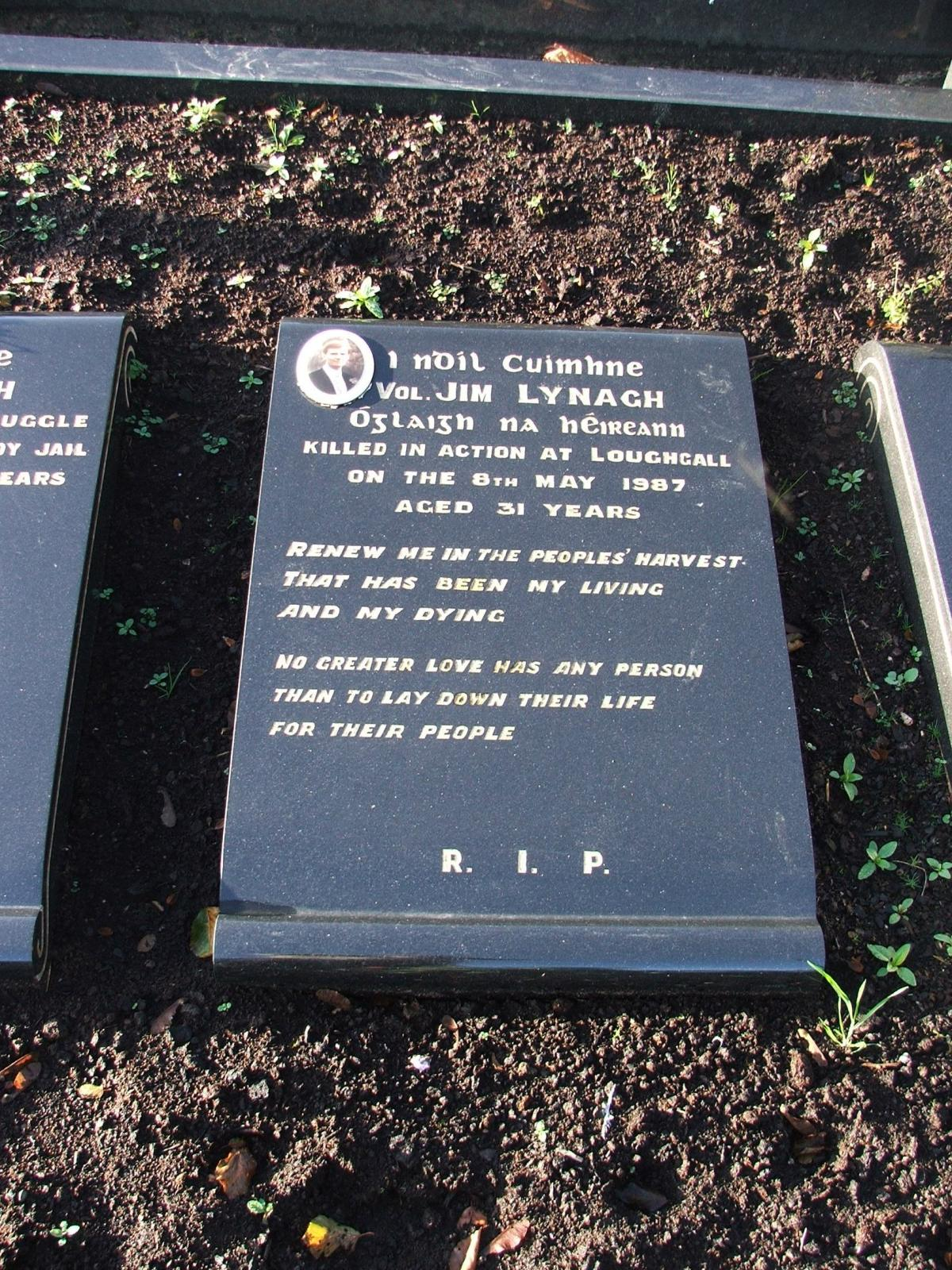
Tablet erected for Jim Lynagh.

== See also ==
- The Troubles in Loughgall
