= Patrick Joseph Kelly =

IRA member

Patrick Kelly
- Born: 19 March 1957; Carrickfergus, County Antrim, Northern Ireland
- Died: 8 May 1987 (aged 30); Loughgall, County Armagh Northern Ireland
- Military career
- Allegiance: Provisional Irish Republican Army
- Service years: c. 1974–1987
- Rank: Officer Commanding
- Unit: East Tyrone Brigade
- Conflicts: The Troubles

Patrick Joseph Kelly (19 March 1957 – 8 May 1987), was an Irish commander of the East Tyrone Brigade of the Provisional Irish Republican Army during the mid-1980s until his death in a Special Air Service ambush at Loughgall, County Armagh in May 1987.

== Background ==
The oldest child in a Roman Catholic family of five, Kelly was born and lived in Carrickfergus until he was 16 before the family returned to live in Dungannon. Patrick Kelly's uncle was the Irish Republican activist and elected official Liam Kelly.

== Paramilitary activity ==
Kelly became a member of the Provisional Irish Republican Army at the beginning of the 1970s and became one of the most experienced IRA men in Tyrone. He was arrested in February 1982 based on testimony from an informant named Patrick McGurk but was released in October 1983 due to lack of evidence, after a trial that lasted fifteen minutes.

In 1985, Kelly became brigade commander in East Tyrone and began developing tactics for attacking isolated Royal Ulster Constabulary (RUC) bases in his area. Under his leadership the East Tyrone Brigade became the most active IRA unit.

In 1986, Kelly attended the IRA Army Convention where the main topic of discussion was the principle of abstentionism. Gerry Adams and others argued that the abstentionist rule should be dropped and the Provisional movement should become involved in constitutional politics. Kelly voted against dropping the rule, and a rift with the majority of the IRA Army Council ensued.

== Loughgall ambush ==
Patrick Kelly was killed by the Special Air Service on 8 May 1987 whilst he was participating in an attack on Loughgall police station, in which seven other IRA men: Pádraig McKearney, Declan Arthurs, Seamus Donnelly, Tony Gormley, Eugene Kelly, Jim Lynagh, and Gerard O'Callaghan also died. Kelly's funeral in Dungannon was one of the largest in Tyrone during the Troubles.

Kelly was buried in Edendork cemetery, two miles from his home in Dungannon.

== See also ==
- The Troubles in Loughgall
