= Pádraig McKearney =

PIRA volunteer (1954–1987)

Pádraig Oliver McKearney (18 December 1954 – 8 May 1987) was a Provisional Irish Republican Army (IRA) paramilitary. He was killed during a British Army ambush at Loughgall, County Armagh in May 1987, aged 32. He had 15 years of service as an IRA Volunteer when he was shot dead at Loughgall, making him one of the most experienced IRA Volunteers ever killed by British forces.

== Background ==
Pádraig McKearney was raised in Moy, County Tyrone, in a staunchly Irish republican family. Both his grandfathers had fought in the Irish Republican Army during the Irish War of Independence, his maternal grandfather in south County Roscommon and his paternal grandfather in east County Tyrone. He was educated at local Catholic schools in Collegeland and Moy, and later went to St Patrick's Academy, Dungannon.

== IRA career ==
He joined the Provisional IRA and was first arrested in 1972 on charges of blowing up the post office in Moy. He spent six weeks on remand, but was released due to insufficient evidence. In December 1973 he was arrested again and later sentenced to seven years for possession of a rifle. He was imprisoned in Long Kesh and later in Magilligan prison. During this time, a younger brother, Seán, also an IRA paramilitary, was killed on 13 May 1974. He was released in 1977 but was sentenced to 14 years in August 1980 after being caught by the British Army with a loaded sten gun along with another IRA member Gerard O'Callaghan. That same year an older brother, Tommy McKearney, who was sentenced to life imprisonment for the murder of an off-duty Ulster Defence Regiment soldier who worked as a postman in 1977, nearly died on hunger strike after refusing food for 53 days. Another brother, Kevin, and an uncle, Jack McKearney, were both murdered by Loyalist paramilitaries in revenge attacks upon the family.

On 25 September 1983 McKearney took part in the Maze Prison escape along with 37 other prisoners. At the beginning of 1984 he rejoined IRA activity in his native East Tyrone with the Provisional IRA East Tyrone Brigade. He advocated the commencement of the "third phase" of the armed struggle, the 'strategic defensive', in which the Royal Ulster Constabulary, Ulster Defence Regiment and British Army would be denied all support in selected areas following repeated attacks on their bases.^{1} In 1985 Patrick Kelly became commander of the Provisional IRA East Tyrone Brigade and it was under his leadership that this strategy was pursued. Remote Royal Ulster Constabulary (RUC) bases were attacked and destroyed, and building contractors who tried to repair them were targeted and sometimes murdered, as occurred with the attack on the Ballygawley police station in December 1985, which killed two policemen, and The Birches police station in August 1986.

== Death ==
McKearney was shot dead by the Special Air Service on 8 May 1987 during an IRA attack that he was taking part in upon Loughgall police station, which also claimed the lives of seven other IRA members. His body was buried at his hometown of Moy.

== Footnotes ==
^1 The "Third Phase" in Provisional IRA thinking represented an escalation of the conflict in Northern Ireland with the eventual aim of using more conventional warfare by taking and holding "liberated zones" along the border. Due to a number of factors, including the loss of experienced activists at Loughgall and the interception of 120 tonnes of Libyan weaponry aboard the Eksund ship, this strategy was never carried out. (See also: Provisional IRA arms importation and Provisional IRA campaign 1969-1997.)

== See also ==
- The Troubles in Loughgall

== Sources ==
- Ed Moloney, Secret History of the IRA
- Derek Dunne, Out of the Maze
- Peter Taylor, Provos The IRA and Sinn Féin
