= Clonoe =

Village in County Tyrone, Northern Ireland

Coordinates: 54.5336°N 6.6723°W

- Location within Northern Ireland
- County: County Tyrone
- Country: Northern Ireland
- Sovereign state: United Kingdom
- Police: Northern Ireland
- Fire: Northern Ireland
- Ambulance: Northern Ireland
- UK Parliament: Mid Ulster
- NI Assembly: Mid Ulster

Clonoe (from Irish Cluain Eo) is a small village and a civil parish in County Tyrone, Northern Ireland. It includes O'Rahilly Park where the Clonoe O'Rahillys Gaelic Athletic Association (GAA) club play their home games. It was the scene of the Clonoe ambush in 1992.

== Notable residents ==
- Michelle O'Neill
- Mickey Mansell

== See also ==
- List of civil parishes of County Tyrone
