= Ballygawley, County Tyrone =

Village in County Tyrone, Northern Ireland

Coordinates: 54.4618°N 7.0280°W

Ballygawley: Irish: Baile Uí Dhálaigh
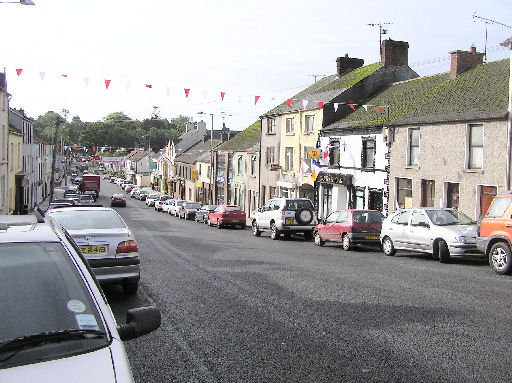
- Main Street

- Location within Northern Ireland
- Population: 976 (2021 Census)
- Irish grid reference: H630574
  - Belfast: 52 mi (84 km)
- District: Mid Ulster
- County: County Tyrone
- Country: Northern Ireland
- Sovereign state: United Kingdom
- Post town: DUNGANNON
- Postcode district: BT71
- Dialling code: 028, +44 28
- UK Parliament: Fermanagh and South Tyrone
- NI Assembly: Fermanagh and South Tyrone

Ballygawley or Ballygawly (from Irish Baile Uí Dhálaigh, meaning 'Ó Dálaigh's town') is a village in County Tyrone, Northern Ireland. It is about 14 miles (20 km) west of Dungannon, near the meeting of the A5 Derry–Dublin and A4 Dungannon–Enniskillen roads.

== Geography ==
An American visitor in 1925 commented on the way the village was laid out: "...Ballygawley, which I found to be a village or settlement on two streets (or possibly on one street which turned at right angles to my left as I stood looking at the buildings when I came in sight of the place). It was a wide street, with excellent cement sidewalks not very wide, and the buildings came up flush with the sidewalks, and there were no alleys, driveways or paths between the buildings."

It is a compact village around the L-shaped Main Street and Church Street, formerly Meeting House Street, with a second cluster of development to the southwest. The main cluster inholds most of the village's facilities; two primary schools, churches and a range of shops and services. The cluster of development to the southwest inholds a secondary school and housing. Ballygawley had a population of 642 at the 2001 census.

== History ==
Ballygawley is also known as "Errigal-Kerogue" or "Errigal-Kieran", supposedly from the dedication of an ancient church to St. Kieran (Ciarán of Clonmacnoise). It was in the barony of Clogher, along the River Blackwater. Some of the remains of the old church were known, and an ancient Franciscan friary, founded by Conn O'Neill, 1st Earl of Tyrone. In the churchyard was a large stone cross, and a holy well.

=== The Troubles ===
For more information see The Troubles in Ballygawley, which includes a list of incidents in Ballygawley during the Troubles resulting in two or more fatalities, as well as:

- Attack on Ballygawley barracks, 1985.
- Ballygawley bus bombing, 1988.

== Development ==
Ballygawley is acquiring extensive development with the major upgrade to the A4 and the building of the new roundabout to accommodate the traffic congestion from the main Aughnacloy road. These road improvements many contractors have been submitting plans for extensive housing developments. The most exciting of all being the redevelopment of Main st leading onto Church Street, with plans for new bars and restaurants. There is speculation of the Stewart Arms hotel being reopened and other developments such as the health spa at 'Grangemount'. There are other developments such as the rebuilding of Loughrans Castle as a historical building to house historical items from the surrounding area. The Ballygawley River is a major tourist attraction supplying the finest of fresh water fishing in Ireland. The original hydro-electric station at the old Dungannon Road is being rebuilt to provide a large amount of the village's energy.

== Events ==
Although having an Irish nationalist majority, Ballygawley is paraded through by the unionist loyal orders without any incident and last held the Orange Orders "Twelfth" celebrations in 2018, and the Royal Black Institutions "Black Saturday" demonstration in 2011.

Outdoor activity centre Todds Leap is located in Ballygawley hosting various events and outdoor activities.

== Transport ==
Ballygawley railway station (on the narrow gauge Clogher Valley Railway) opened on 2 May 1887 but was shut on 1 January 1942.

The village is served by Bus Eireann Expressway Route 32, with service to both Dublin and Letterkenny.

== Education ==
Schools in the area include Richmond Primary School, St. Mary's Primary School and St Ciaran's College.

== Sport ==
Errigal Ciarán GAC is the local Gaelic Athletic Association club.

== Demography ==
=== 19th century population ===
The population of the village decreased during the 19th century:

Year	1841	1851	1861	1871	1881	1891
Population	881	768	680	560	446	397
Houses	166	145	147	126	136	126

=== 2011 census ===
On census day in 2011 (27 March 2011), the usually resident population of Ballygawley Settlement was 711. Of these:

- 22.22% were aged under 16 and 13.22% were aged 65 and over
- 46.55% of the population were male and 53.45% were female
- 80.87% belong to or were brought up in the Catholic religion and 17.02% belong to or were brought up in a 'Protestant and Other Christian (including Christian related)' religion; and
- 15.61% indicated that they had a British national identity, 44.59% had an Irish national identity and 36.43% had a Northern Irish national identity.

== People ==
- Mickey Harte, the Gaelic football manager who led Tyrone to All Ireland success in 2003, 2005 and 2008, was born in Ballygawley in 1952.
- Michaela McAreavey, daughter of Mickey Harte, who was murdered in 2011 whilst on honeymoon in Mauritius.
- Malachy O'Rourke, the footballer and manager, lived in Ballygawley from the early 1990s onwards

== Ballygawley townland ==
Ballygawley townland is situated in the historic barony of Clogher and the civil parish of Errigal Keerogue and covers an area of 123 acres.

The population of the townland declined during the 19th century:

Year	1841	1851	1861	1871	1881	1891
Population	84	73	62	68	49	34
Houses	19	18	19	15	14	11

The townland contains one Scheduled Historic Monument: a Castle (grid ref: H6324 5749).

== See also ==
- List of townlands of County Tyrone

== Bibliography ==
- Ballygawley National School (Tyrone). 1990. Register of Ballygawley National School, 1893–1951. Salt Lake City, Utah: Filmed by the Genealogical Society of Utah. Ballygawley is a town in Errigal Keerogue Parish. The school was under the jurisdiction of the Southern School Board. Microfilm of original records at the Public Record Office, Belfast. Includes indexes.
- Errigal Keerogue. 1837. A Topographical Dictionary of Ireland.
- Geological Survey of Ireland, J. Nolan, and E.T. Hardman. 1877. Sheet 34 Ballygawley. Dublin: Geological Survey of Ireland. Scale 1:63 360. Hand colored map.
- Harris, Mary N.. 2004. MacRory, Joseph. Oxford: Oxford University Press. MacRory, Joseph (bap. 1861, d. 1945), cardinal, was born in Ballygawley, co. Tyrone, where he was baptized on 10 March 1861, one of ten children of Francis MacRory (d. 1867?), a small farmer, and Rose Montague.
- Ingram, Brett. 1970. The Armavigil. Ballygawley: the Author. Produced for the Irish Church Independence Centenary pageant. 61 pages.
- Ingram, Brett. 1960. The Ulstertide. Ireland: s.n. Ulster (Ireland) -- Emigration and immigration.
- KIRKLAND, RICHARD. 2009. "Ballygawley, Ballylynn, Belfast: Writing about Modernity and Settlement in Northern Ireland". The Irish Review. (40/41): 18–32.
- Latimer, W. T. 1900. "Interesting Find at Ballygawley". The Journal of the Royal Society of Antiquaries of Ireland. 10 (4): 368.
- Ordnance Survey of Ireland. 2011. Mid Tyrone 1900. Dunston [u.a.]: Godfrey. Map: English: Surveyed in 1833–34, rev. in 1900 and publ. 1902, printed 1904. Scale: 1:63.360.
- Pringle, Margaret. 1960. History of Pringle family. Salt Lake City, Utah: Filmed by the Genealogical Society of Utah. Margaret Pringle was born in 1836, married a Presbyterian clergyman of Ballygawley, and died 1906.
