= The Birches, County Armagh =

Village in County Armagh, Northern Ireland

Coordinates: 54°29′N 6°33′W

The Birches (Irish: Coill Bheithe) is a small village in northern County Armagh, Northern Ireland. It is 6 miles northwest of Portadown, close to junction 12 on the M1 Motorway and to the southern shore of Lough Neagh. In the 2001 Census it had a population of 150. It is within the Armagh City, Banbridge and Craigavon council area.

The Birches is part of the civil parish of Tartaraghan, and most of the settlement is within the townlands of Ballynarry and Clonmakate. Two parts to the village can be distinguished, that at Robinstown Road, centred on a public housing estate and a school, and that part adjacent to the M1 junction.

== Places of interest ==
- Stonewall Jackson's ancestral site is at Waugh's Farm, The Birches (Jackson also had roots in Coleraine, County Londonderry).

== Education ==
- Birches Primary School

== See also ==
- List of villages in Northern Ireland
- List of towns in Northern Ireland
