= Woolwich bombing =

Woolwich bombing may refer to:

- Kings Arms, Woolwich bombing, 1974
- 1983 Royal Artillery Barracks bombing
