= Timeline of the Irish Republican Army =

This is a timeline of the history of the Irish Republican Army.

Note: Articles prior to 1916 refer to armed nationalist movements that predated and presaged the foundation of the Irish Republican Army in 1913 – organizations such as the Fenian Brotherhood, Clan na Gael and the Irish Republican Brotherhood. All claims to use the title after 1922 (when the Anglo-Irish Treaty ended the War of Independence) are formally disputed, despite widespread usage in practice. There is a further dispute regarding the 1969 split between the "Official" IRA and the (subsequently dominant) splinter groups the Provisional IRA and Irish National Liberation Army, again despite widespread usage in practice.

see also Chronology of the Irish War of Independence 1919-21, Chronology of the Irish Civil War 1922-23, Irish Republican Army (1922–1969), Chronology of Provisional IRA actions 1969-present

- 1900s: 1900 - 1901 - 1902 - 1903 - 1904 - 1905 - 1906 - 1907 - 1908 - 1909
- 1910s: 1910 - 1911 - 1912 - 1913 - 1914 - 1915 - 1916 - 1917 - 1918 - 1919
- 1920s: 1920 - 1921 - 1922 - 1923 - 1924 - 1925 - 1926 - 1927 - 1928 - 1929
- 1930s: 1930 - 1931 - 1932 - 1933 - 1934 - 1935 - 1936 - 1937 - 1938 - 1939
- 1940s: 1940 - 1941 - 1942 - 1943 - 1944 - 1945 - 1946 - 1947 - 1948 - 1949
- 1950s: 1950 - 1951 - 1952 - 1953 - 1954 - 1955 - 1956 - 1957 - 1958 - 1959
- 1960s: 1960 - 1961 - 1962 - 1963 - 1964 - 1965 - 1966 - 1967 - 1968 - 1969
- 1970s: 1970 - 1971 - 1972 - 1973 - 1974 - 1975 - 1976 - 1977 - 1978 - 1979
- 1980s: 1980 - 1981 - 1982 - 1983 - 1984 - 1985 - 1986 - 1987 - 1988 - 1989
- 1990s: 1990 - 1991 - 1992 - 1993 - 1994 - 1995 - 1996 - 1997 - 1998 - 1999
- 2000s: 2000 - 2001 - 2002 - 2003 - 2004 - 2005 - 2006 - 2007 - 2008 - 2009
- 2010s: 2010 - 2011 - 2012 - 2013 - 2014 - 2015 - 2016 - 2017 - 2018 - 2019
- 2020s: 2020
