= 1900 in the Irish Republican Army =

The following notable events occurred during the year 1900 in the Irish Republican Army:

- Due in large part to efforts by the United Irish League, the Nationalist Parties come under the leadership of John Redmond although he would remain in disagreement with William O'Brien over the league's relationship with the party.
- Laurence Ginnell campaigns as a parliamentary candidate for the United Irish League for North Westmeath, however he fails to win.
- The Daughters of Ireland, an early cultural organization promoting the Irish language and culture, is established by Maud Gonne.

== See also ==
- 1900 in Ireland
- Timeline of the Irish Republican Army
