= Chronology of Provisional Irish Republican Army actions (1980–1989) =

This is a chronology of activities by the Provisional Irish Republican Army (IRA) from 1980 to 1989. For actions before and after this period see Chronology of Provisional Irish Republican Army actions.

== 1980 ==
=== January–March ===
- 1 January: The IRA ambushed a Royal Ulster Constabulary (RUC) patrol in Lisnaskea, County Fermanagh. A bomb damaged a shop on Main Street before IRA Volunteers opened fire on responding officers. The RUC returned fire.
- 2 January:
  - An ex-Ulster Defence Regiment (UDR) soldier, Samuel Lundy, was shot dead by the Provisional Irish Republican Army (IRA), at his workplace, Kingsmills, near Bessbrook, County Armagh.
  - A 300 lb land mine was discovered on a road near Crossmaglen, County Armagh, before it could be detonated. The device was later defused by the British Army.
  - A bomb exploded at commercial premises on Main Street, Castledawson, County Londonderry, causing minor damage to a shop.
- 3 January: RUC officer Robert Crilly was shot dead at his workplace, Main Street, Newtownbutler, County Fermanagh, by the IRA.
- 4 January:
  - The IRA ambushed an RUC mobile patrol on the Antrim Road, Belfast, after a hoax drew officers to the area. Around 15 shots were fired. The IRA claimed that one RUC officer was slightly injured.
  - Three bombs exploded at commercial premises in Belfast city centre, causing extensive damage.
  - The IRA opened fire on a UDR patrol near Carland Bridge, County Tyrone. The patrol returned fire.
- 6 January: Three UDR soldiers (James Cochrane, Robert Smyth, Richard Wilson) were killed on mobile patrol at Burren Bridge, near Castlewellan, County Down, by a landmine.
- 12 January: RUC officer David Purse was shot dead when an IRA unit ambushed a foot patrol at the main gate of Seaview football ground, Shore Road, Skegoneill, Belfast.
- 15 January:
  - The IRA detonated a landmine as two unmarked RUC vehicles passed near Forkhill, County Armagh, slightly injuring three RUC officers. The explosion was followed by an exchange of fire.
  - Two bombs in shopping trolleys exploded outside a bank in Waring Street, Belfast.
  - Two bombs exploded at two banks in Belleek, County Fermanagh.
  - A 300 lb car bomb exploded in the centre of Armagh city, causing extensive damage.
  - A large group of IRA members occupied a customs post at Aughnacloy on the Tyrone-Monaghan border, which was then destroyed by a bomb.
  - A bomb exploded outside a shop in Bellaghy, County Londonderry. A bomb also wrecked a shop in Kilrea, County Londonderry.
- 16 January:
  - An IRA unit fired fourteen shots at a British Army foot patrol in the centre of Newry. The ambush was carried out by two IRA Volunteers in a car. British soldiers returned fire, but the Volunteers escaped safely.
  - An IRA unit bombed a business in Abercorn Square, Strabane. A 74-year-old civilian was injured.
- 17 January:
  - An IRA bomb detonated prematurely on a train near Dunmurry, County Antrim. One of the bombers (Kevin Delaney) and two civilians (Mark Cochrane and Max Olorunda) were killed.
  - Three IRA Volunteers bombed a business on Monaghmore Street, Dungannon, County Tyrone, destroying the building.
  - An IRA unit bombed a hotel in Belleek, County Fermanagh.
  - An IRA unit bombed a business in Hill Street, Maghera, County Londonderry.
- 18 January: Prison officer Graham Cox was shot dead by the IRA while driving home from Magilligan Prison, Limavady Road, Stradreagh, near Derry.
- 19 January: The IRA bombed Newry and Mourne District Council Offices at Monaghan Row, Newry.
- 20 January: A bomb exploded at a business in Stewartstown, County Tyrone, destroying the building.
- 26 January: British soldier Errol Pryce was shot dead while on foot patrol by an IRA sniper on Whiterock Road, Ballymurphy, Belfast.
- 29 January: The IRA fired several shots at two British Army vehicles on Culmore Road, Derry.
- 31 January: An IRA unit bombed a business on the Woodstock Road, Belfast.
- 1 February: An IRA unit bombed the Citybus depot on the Falls Road, Belfast, destroying 20 buses.
- 2 February: An IRA unit shot and seriously wounded an off-duty UDR member at Holybrook, near Lisnaskea, County Fermanagh.
- 3 February: A bomb exploded at a business on Strand Road, Derry. An RUC officer was injured.
- 4 February: A bomb exploded at a business in Victoria Street, Belfast.
- 5 February:
  - A UDR soldier (Aubrey Abercrombie) was shot dead by the IRA at his farm in Edenmore, near Kinawley, Fermanagh.
  - An IRA unit bombed a post office in Water Street, Derry.
- 9 February: An IRA unit fired on a British Army foot patrol in Coalisland, County Tyrone, afterward claiming they wounded a soldier.
- 10 February:
  - A bomb exploded at a business on the Cookstown–Pomeroy Road, County Tyrone.
  - A bomb exploded at a furniture shop in Cookstown, County Tyrone.
- 11 February: two RUC officers (Winston Howe and Joseph Rose) were killed and a soldier was badly injured when the IRA detonated an 800 lb (360 kg) landmine on the main Rosslea–Lisnaskea road.
- 12 February: An IRA unit bombed commercial offices in High Street, Belfast.
- 13 February: A bomb exploded at a business in Margaret Square, Newry.
- 15 February:
  - An IRA sniper shot and wounded a British soldier working on a radio mast at Whiterock barracks, West Belfast.
  - A bomb exploded at a business in Waterloo Place, Derry.
  - A bomb exploded at a business on Strand Road, Derry.
- 16 February:
  - a senior British Army officer (Mark Coe) was shot dead by an IRA unit outside his home, Bielefeld, West Germany.
  - An IRA sniper fired on a British Army military police patrol at Duke Street, Derry.
  - An IRA unit exchanged gunfire with an RUC patrol at Galgorm Road, Ballymena, County Antrim.
- 20 February: An IRA sniper fired on a British Army mobile patrol on Asylum Road, Derry.
- 21 February: A bomb exploded at the Ardoyne Citybus depot in Belfast, destroying 20 buses and damaging a further 10.
- 22 February: An IRA unit fired on a British Army mobile patrol on the Monagh Road, Turf Lodge, Belfast.
- 25 February: An IRA sniper fired on a British Army mobile patrol in Twinbrook, Belfast.
- 28 February: An IRA unit shot and seriously wounded a UDR soldier near Belleek, County Fermanagh.
- 1 March:
  - Bombs exploded at the Ulsterbus depot in Newry, County Down, destroying 11 buses and damaging three others.
  - An IRA unit ambushed a British military police patrol in Muenster, West Germany, seriously wounding a British Army corporal.
- 2 March: Bombs exploded at the clubhouse of Dungannon Rugby Club, County Tyrone.
- 3 March: Bombs exploded at businesses on Main Street, Maghera, County Londonderry.
- 5 March: An IRA unit fired five shots at a British Army working party inside Creggan Piggery Ridge barracks, Derry.
- 6 March:
  - A former UDR soldier (Henry Livingstone) was shot dead on his farm at Cortyna, near Tynan, County Armagh.
  - An IRA unit fired on a plain-clothes RUC officer in an unmarked car on Fanad Drive, Creggan, Derry. His car was hit several times.
  - The IRA carried out a bombing attack on a timber yard in Derry.
- 7 March:
  - A remote-controlled car bomb exploded beside a British Army foot patrol of the King's Own Royal Border Regiment in Crossmaglen, County Armagh. Three soldiers were injured, one (Sean Walker) "very seriously". He died two weeks later,
  - The IRA detonated two bombs at a department store in Armagh city, visited ten days earlier by the wife of Secretary of State Humphrey Atkins.
- 8 March: An RUC sergeant was injured in an IRA bomb attack on a shop on Strand Road, Derry.
- 9 March: The IRA planted half a dozen bombs at a factory near Coalisland, County Tyrone. Damage was estimated at more than £5 million.
- 10 March:
  - A British soldier was shot several times but survived, while jogging near a barracks in Osnabrück, West Germany.
  - An IRA unit fired 15 shots at an RUC vehicle entering the RUC station in Coalisland, County Tyrone.
  - The IRA carried out a bombing attack on the a bank at Finaghy Crossroads, Belfast. The explosion started a fire which badly damaged the building.
  - The IRA carried out a bombing attack on a clothing wholesaler in King Street, Belfast, causing extensive damage.
  - The IRA bombed a garage near Omagh, County Tyrone.
- 11 March: An IRA unit fired shots at a British Army radio relay station in Bielefeld, West Germany.
- 15 March: British soldier John Bateman was shot dead by an IRA sniper in Crossmaglen, South Armagh.
- 17 March: The IRA claimed responsibility for shooting and seriously wounding an off-duty UDR soldier near Gransha Hospital, Derry. The INLA also claimed responsibility.
- 22 March: several bombs exploded at the customs post on the Dundalk Road, near Newry. One office was destroyed and other parts of the complex were damaged.
- 25 March: The IRA bombed a golf clubhouse in Armagh city, gutting the building.
- 26 March: An IRA unit detonated a bomb as a British Army Saracen APC passed outside Crossmaglen, County Armagh, critically injuring a soldier.
- 27 March:
  - an IRA unit carried out a double-bomb attack on a bank in Gortin, County Tyrone, destroying the building.
  - an IRA unit fired two shots at an RUC officer guarding the home of a former judge on the Antrim Road, Belfast.

=== April–June ===
- 1 April: IRA member Robert Carr died nine days after being wounded in a premature bomb explosion, Customs Office, Newry, County Down.
- 4 April:
  - RUC officer Bernard Montgomery was shot dead by the IRA at his workplace, Glenbank Industrial Estate, Ligoniel, Belfast.
  - an IRA unit carried out a bomb attack in Donegall Street, Belfast, causing considerable fire damage.
- 9 April:
  - An RUC patrol was ambushed by an IRA unit on Stewartstown Road, Suffolk, Belfast; one officer (Stephen Magill) was shot dead.
  - An IRA unit bombed the Customs House in Newry, County Down, destroying the building by fire.
- 10 April: An IRA unit planted several bombs at a shop at Shipquay Street and Bank Place, Derry.
- 11 April: An off-duty RUC reserve officer, Fred Wilson, was shot dead by the IRA while on his way to work on Franklin Street, Belfast.
- 12 April: A bomb exploded at a store at Merchant's Quay, Newry, County Down.
- 19 April:
  - An IRA unit opened fire with automatic weapons on two RUC vehicles in the Twinbrook area of Belfast.
  - The IRA launched a mortar attack on the RUC station in Newry. One mortar bomb breached the barracks wall, while the attack also caused civilian casualties after the mortars misfired.
- 22 April:
  - An IRA unit bombed the Fir Trees Lodge Hotel on the outskirts of Strabane, County Tyrone, destroying the building by fire.
  - An IRA unit detonated a car bomb outside the Charlemont Hotel in English Street, Armagh, causing extensive damage to the building.
  - An IRA unit detonated a car bomb at the Woodlands Hotel in Lisburn, County Antrim, causing extensive damage.
- 23–24 April:
  - The IRA carried out a series of bomb attacks against shops in Dungannon, County Tyrone.
  - The IRA detonated a bomb outside a business on Sweep Road, Cookstown, County Tyrone.
  - The IRA carried out four bomb attacks against a business in Omagh, County Tyrone, gutting the building.
- 25 April: The IRA shot dead a civilian (Michael Madden) at his home, Lenadoon Avenue, Belfast, as an alleged British informant.
- 27 April: An IRA unit fired two shots at a British Army mobile patrol on High Street, Newry, County Down.
- 28 April: Two bombs at a restaurant were defused by the British Army in Cloghy, near Portaferry, County Down.
- 29 April: The IRA detonated a 400 lb car bomb outside a hotel in Larne, County Antrim, causing extensive damage.
- 30 April:
  - A British Army officer was seriously injured when an IRA booby-trap bomb exploded in his car outside his home in Enniskillen, County Fermanagh.
  - A bomb damaged a railway signal box near Lisburn.
- 2 May:
  - An undercover British Army unit was ambushed by an IRA unit on the Antrim Road, Belfast; in the ensuing gun battle, Captain Herbert Westmacott was killed.
  - A 200 lb booby-trap bomb was detonated by remote control targeting British soldiers and RUC officers, near Crossmaglen, County Armagh. An RUC man was injured.
- 3 May: An IRA unit bombed the cross-border electricity link near Moybane, about two miles south of Crossmaglen, County Armagh. Several explosions toppled a pylon and severed four of the six cables it carried.
- 6 May: The IRA bombed two railway bridges on the Dublin–Belfast railway line in South Armagh. The Kilnasaggart railway bridge was demolished and another bridge about 600 yards away was extensively damaged, severing the rail link.
- 7 May:
  - An IRA unit shot and injured a part-time member of the UDR while driving near Castlederg, County Tyrone.
  - An IRA unit bombed a tyre depot in Foyle Road, Derry, starting a fire which caused extensive damage.
  - The IRA claimed to have shot dead a man employed by the RUC while he was driving near Carrickfergus, County Antrim. However, there were no recorded fatalities on this date.
- 8 May: A bomb destroyed a British Army robot near Kilnasaggart railway bridge, which had been demolished in an earlier IRA attack.
- 9 May:
  - An IRA active service unit planted bombs at an estate agents in Donegall Square East, Belfast city centre.
  - A bomb left on a hijacked bus in Belfast city centre exploded while British Army bomb disposal experts were attempting to defuse it.
- 13 May: An IRA unit engaged British soldiers and RUC officers in a gun battle at Middletown, County Armagh. The IRA claimed to have fired around 400 rounds and British forces returned approximately 300 rounds during the exchange, which lasted around half an hour.
- 14 May: Two bombs exploded at a factory in Coalisland, County Tyrone.
- 15 May: Two bombs were defused at a golf club in Dungannon, County Tyrone.
- 18 May: An IRA unit planted a bomb at Larne RUC barracks, County Antrim. The explosion caused some damage.
- 22 May:
  - The IRA shot and seriously wounded an RUC officer in Tower Street, off the Lower Newtownards Road, Belfast.
- 29 May:
  - Hijacked vehicles, some containing hoax bombs, were used to block major roads in Belfast. Two vehicles containing live bombs exploded at Wellington Place in the city centre and Broadway Road in West Belfast.
  - A 50lb car bomb exploded outside a hotel in Fivemiletown, County Tyrone.
- 30 May:
  - An IRA unit shot and wounded an RUC reservist in an ambush on Springfield Road, Belfast.
  - An IRA sniper operating at long-range shot and wounded a British soldier working on the roof of the new barracks at Crossmaglen, County Armagh.
- 31 May: An IRA unit carried out a punishment shooting on a man in County Donegal they accused of being a witness at a trial which resulted in the sentencing of two IRA members.
- 2 June:
  - An IRA unit planted four bombs at a hotel in Ballycastle, County Antrim. The devices were dealt with by the British Army.
- 4 June:
  - An IRA unit fired eight shots at a lorry driven by a UDR soldier near Cookstown, County Tyrone. The vehicle crashed but the soldier wasn't hit.
  - An IRA unit fired twenty-two shots at a car driven by a UDR soldier near Aughnacloy, County Tyrone. He escaped injury.
- 7 June:
  - A 300 lb land mine was detonated as an RUC mobile patrol passed near Newtownhamilton, County Armagh. Four RUC men were injured, three of whom were hospitalised.
  - A UDR soldier (Richard Latimer) was shot dead by the IRA at his shop, Main Street, Newtownbutler, Fermanagh.
  - An IRA unit engaged British Army troops in a gun battle near Crossmaglen, County Armagh. The exchange lasted around half an hour, with both sides firing approximately 300 rounds.
- 8 June:
  - Two bombs at a hotel defused by the British Army in Coagh, County Tyrone.
  - A British Army bomb disposal officer was seriously injured when a booby-trap device exploded at while he defusing a bomb at a shop in Dungannon, County Tyrone. Earlier, two bombs exploded at another business nearby.
- 8 June: A 400 lb car bomb detonated on Customs House Street, Derry. A British Army bomb disposal officer narrowly escaped injury. The explosion caused extensive damage to offices and businesses in the city centre.
- 10 June: An IRA unit shot and wounded a prison warden as he left his home in the Ballygomartin area of Belfast. The IRA had halted attacks on prison staff following a visit to the Maze Prison by Cardinal Tomás Ó Fiaich in March.
- 28 June: An ex-UDR soldier, William Elliott, was shot dead by the IRA at a cattle market, Ballybay, County Monaghan.

=== July–September ===
- 1 July: IRA volunteer Terence O'Neill was shot dead by the RUC while running away from Whiterock Community Centre, Ballymurphy, Belfast.
- 19 July: An off-duty British soldier, Christopher Watson, was shot dead by the IRA while drinking in the Village Inn, Rosemount, Derry.
- 27 July: British soldier Robert Thompson was killed when the IRA detonated a remote-controlled bomb as a British foot patrol crossed the Moy Bridge, near Aughnacloy, County Tyrone.
- 3 August: An off-duty UDR soldier, William Clarke, was shot dead by an IRA sniper while travelling in his car along laneway, Gortnessy, near Pettigo, County Donegal.
- 9 August: British soldier Brian Brown was killed in an IRA bomb attack on a foot-patrol in Forkill, County Armagh.
- 16 August: A Catholic civilian, Colette Meek, was accidentally shot and killed by the IRA during a sniper attack on Royal Ulster Constabulary (RUC) mobile patrol, Alliance Avenue, Ardoyne, Belfast.
- 4 September: Protestant civilian Ross Hearst was abducted by the IRA outside a friend's home, Silver Stream, near Monaghan. He was found shot dead several hours later at Wards Cross, near Middletown, County Armagh.
- 12 September: RUC officer Wallace Allen, who had been abducted twelve days earlier by the IRA while driving a milk lorry near Newtownhamilton, County Armagh, was found shot dead at Trainor's Bridge, near Newtownhamilton, County Armagh.
- 23 September: An off-duty RUC reservist, Ernest Johnston, was shot dead while driving into the laneway of his home, Lisrace, near Roslea, County Fermanagh.
- 30 September: An ex-Royal Ulster Constabulary officer, Robert Shields, was shot at his workplace, ambulance depot, Royal Victoria Hospital, Falls Road, Belfast.

=== October–December ===
- 10 October: UDR soldier James Hewitt was killed in an IRA booby-trap bomb left under his car, parked at cattle mart, Tandragee Road, Portadown, County Armagh.
- 13 October: Garda Síochána officer Seamus Quaid was shot dead by the IRA during an exchange of gunfire, shortly after stopping a vehicle containing an IRA unit while on Garda mobile patrol at Ballyconnick, near Cleariestown, County Wexford.
- 27 October: seven Irish republican prisoners, including Brendan Hughes, Tommy McKearney and Raymond McCartney, began the 1980 hunger strike.
- 11 November: British soldier Owen McQuade was shot dead by the IRA while sitting in a stationary British Army minibus in the main driveway of Altnagelvin Hospital, Derry.
- 12 November: Catholic civilian Oliver Walsh was killed by a land mine while travelling in his car, Lislea, near Camlough, County Armagh. His car was mistaken for an undercover RUC mobile patrol.
- 14 November: Peter Valente, an IRA operative, was found shot dead as an alleged informer in an entry off Highfield Drive, Highfield, Belfast.
- 26 November: Ulster Defence Regiment soldier Norman Donaldson was shot dead by the IRA while leaving an RUC base in Derrygonnelly, County Fermanagh.
- 6 December: Protestant civilian Heather Pollock was shot in her home during a sniper attack on a Royal Ulster Constabulary (RUC) mobile patrol, Strabane, County Tyrone. She died three weeks later.
- 2 December: the IRA injured five people when it bombed a British Army barracks in London.
- 16 December: IRA prisoner Gerard Tuite, who had been remanded in connection with 1978 bombing offences in London, escaped from Brixton Prison in London, along with two non-republican prisoners (including Jimmy Moody).

== 1981 ==
=== January–February ===
- 1 January: Eugene Simons, a Catholic, was abducted by the IRA somewhere in the Castlewellan area, County Down. His remains were found, partially buried in a bogland, Newtown, near Knockbridge, County Louth, on 15 May 1984. He was allegedly an IRA volunteer, but he may have been a civilian, who had betrayed the whereabouts of bomb-making material.
- 8 January: an IRA incendiary bomb exploded at a RAF base in Uxbridge, West London. The barracks were evacuated before the blast, which was heard 2 miles away. The base was heavily damaged.
- 16 January: a UDR soldier (Ivan Toombs) was shot dead by the IRA at his workplace, Customs Office, Warrenpoint, County Down.
- 20 January: a British soldier (Christopher Shenton) was shot dead by an IRA sniper while manning an observation post overlooking the City Walls, Bogside, Derry. The IRA supergrass Raymond Gilmour was alleged to have taken part in this attack.
- 20 January: Maurice Gilvarry, Irish Republican Army (IRA) volunteer, was found shot dead near Jonesborough, County Armagh, as an alleged informer.
- 21 January: Ulster Unionist Party politician Norman Stronge and his son James (who was an RUC officer) were killed in an IRA gun and grenade attack on their home, Tynan Abbey, near Middletown, County Armagh. The home was largely destroyed and eventually demolished.
- 25 January: a British soldier (Philip Barker) was shot dead by the IRA during an attack on a British Army pedestrian checkpoint at the junction of Berry Street and Church Lane, Belfast.
- 6 February: a British coal ship, Nelly M, was bombed and sunk by an IRA unit while at anchor in Lough Foyle.
- 6 February: an RUC officer on foot patrol (Charles Lewis) was shot dead while standing outside a shop, Balmoral Avenue, Malone, Belfast.
- 10 February: an off-duty UDR soldier (David Montgomery) was shot dead at his workplace, a timber yard, Strand Road, Derry.
- 22 February: Patrick Trainor, a Catholic civilian, was found shot dead on waste ground, off Glen Road, Andersonstown, Belfast, as an alleged informer.

=== March–April ===
- 1 March: The 1981 hunger strike began in the Maze Prison when IRA prisoner Bobby Sands refused food.
- 27 March: an off-duty UDR soldier (John Smith) was shot dead while on his way to work, Cromac Street, Markets, Belfast.
- 2 April: an off-duty RUC officer (Kenneth Acheson) was killed when the IRA detonated a booby trap bomb attached to his car, shortly after leaving Bessbrook Royal Ulster Constabulary (RUC) base, County Armagh.
- 7 April: a masked gunman shot dead Joanna Mathers, who was collecting forms for the 1981 United Kingdom census at Anderson Crescent, Derry. Irish republicans were boycotting the census, which was being held during the 1981 hunger strike. Sinn Féin claimed the shooting was the work of people "frantically attempting to discredit the election campaign of hunger striker Bobby Sands". The RUC said that the gun had been used in two IRA "punishment shootings".
- 10 April: Bobby Sands was narrowly elected Member of Parliament at Westminster for the Northern Ireland constituency of Fermanagh and South Tyrone in a by-election. The moderate nationalist Social Democratic and Labour Party did not run a candidate, which left Sands as the sole nationalist candidate. Sands had been on a hunger strike for Special Category Status for 41 days prior to being elected.
- 28 April: a UDR soldier (Richard McKee) was shot dead by an IRA sniper while travelling in British Army (BA) civilian-type van, Dublin Road, Castlewellan, County Down.

=== May–June ===
- 5 May: Bobby Sands died after 66 days on hunger strike. His death caused riots in many parts of Northern Ireland, and also in Ireland. An estimated 100,000 people attended his funeral.
- 5 May: an IRA volunteer was injured and another arrested in a gun battle in South Armagh. Twelve undercover British soldiers opened fire on a three-man IRA unit which resulted in a gun battle which lasted several minutes. The British troops fired nearly 700 rounds.
- 6 May: a RUC officer (Philip Ellis) was shot dead by an IRA sniper while on patrol in Duncairn Gardens, Belfast.
- 8 May: The IRA claimed responsibility for firing ten mortars at Newtownhamilton British Army/RUC base, County Armagh. Two British soldiers were injured.
- 9 May: a small bomb exploded at an oil terminal in the Shetland Islands, while Queen Elizabeth II was attending a nearby function to mark the opening of the terminal. A boiler was damaged but no-one was injured and the ceremony continued.
- 14 May: a RUC officer (Samuel Vallely) was killed when his patrol vehicle was hit by an IRA rocket on Springfield Road, Belfast. The rocket had been fired through the roof of the vehicle as it was driving along the road.
- 19 May: five British soldiers (John King, Michael Bagshaw, Paul Bulman, Andrew Gavin, and Grenville Winstone) were killed when their Saracen armoured personnel carrier was destroyed by a large IRA landmine planted in a culvert underneath Chancellors Road near Newry, County Armagh. Vehicle fragments and body parts were found over a 300-yard radius.
- 23 May: two British soldiers were injured when a British Army armoured vehicle was hit by a rocket-propelled grenade fired by an IRA unit at Andersonstown, Belfast.
- 25 May: a UDR soldier (Thomas Ritchie) was shot dead by an IRA sniper while on patrol in Gulladuff, near Maghera, County Londonderry.
- 28 May: an off-duty RUC officer (Mervyn Robinson) was shot dead by the IRA outside Wayside Inn, Whitecross, near Bessbrook, County Armagh. On the same day, two IRA volunteers (Charles Maguire and George McBrearty) were killed in an undercover British Army ambush in Derry.
- 31 May: a RUC officer (Colin Dunlop) was shot dead by the IRA while guarding patient at Royal Victoria Hospital, Falls Road, Belfast. That same day, a British soldier (Michael O'Neill) was killed by a booby trap bomb in an abandoned car, Drumalane Road, Newry, County Down.
- 3 June: a Catholic civilian (Joseph Lynn) was killed during a sniper attack on a British Army foot patrol, Central Drive, Creggan, Derry.
- 5 June: an off-duty UDR soldier (Ronald Graham) was shot dead by the IRA, while delivering coal, Lisnaskea, Fermanagh.
- 10 June: eight IRA prisoners being held on remand at Crumlin Road Jail in Belfast escaped after taking prison officers hostage, taking their uniforms and shooting their way out of the prison using three handguns that had been smuggled in.
- 12 June: the IRA mortared Fort Pegasus British Army barracks in Belfast.
- 17 June: an off-duty RUC officer (Christopher Kyle) was shot dead near his home, Beragh, County Tyrone.
- 20 June: an off-duty RUC officer (Neal Quinn) was shot dead by the IRA while in the Bridge Bar, Newry, County Down. That same day, four mortars hit the MacRory Park British Army base in West Belfast, injuring four British soldiers. The IRA claimed responsibility and said it had evacuated a number of homes before the attack.
- 26 June: a Catholic civilian (Vincent Robinson) was shot dead by the IRA at Divis Flats, Belfast as an alleged informer.

=== July–December ===
- 8 July: John Dempsey, a 16 year old member of the Irish Republican Army Youth Section (IRAF), was shot dead by a British Army sniper during an arson attack on a bus depot, Falls Road, Belfast.
- 9 July: a RUC officer was shot and wounded in an IRA gun attack on Springhill Avenue in Belfast.
- 10 July: the IRA carried out a blast-bomb attack on Fort Pegasus British Army barracks in Belfast.
- 13 July: a British soldier was shot and wounded in the arm by an IRA sniper, Springhill, Belfast.
- 16 July: 18 undercover British soldiers who were waiting in ambush position for an expected IRA roadblock were themselves ambushed by a six-man IRA unit near Glasdrumman, South Armagh. The IRA fired over 250 rounds from an M60 machine gun, killing Lance Corporal Gavin Dean and badly wounding another soldier (see Glasdrumman ambush).
- 21 July 1981: John Hazlett, a Protestant civilian, was shot dead while renovating premises, Bank Square, Maghera, County Londonderry. A fellow worker, an off duty UDR member, was the intended target.
- 2 August: two RUC officers (John Smyth and Andrew Wood) were killed when their mobile patrol vehicle struck an IRA landmine, Loughmacrory, near Omagh, County Tyrone. A British soldier lost both legs when his armoured vehicle was hit by a rocket.
- 5 September: an off-duty British soldier (Sohan Virdee) was shot dead by the IRA shortly after being lured to a house in Stranmillis Park, Stranmillis, Belfast.
- 7 September: two RUC officers (Mark Evans and Stuart Montgomery) were killed when their patrol vehicle struck an IRA landmine at Sessadonaghy, near Cappagh, County Tyrone.
- 12 September: an off-duty UDR soldier (Alan Clarke) was killed in an IRA gun attack while walking along Hall Street, Maghera, County Londonderry.
- 14 September: an off-duty RUC officer (John Proctor) was shot dead by the IRA while leaving Magherafelt Hospital, County Londonderry.
- 26 September: an off-duty RUC officer (George Stewart) was shot dead by the IRA while inside the Ann Boal Inn, Killough, County Down.
- 27 September: a Catholic civilian (Anthony Braniff) was found shot in an entry off Odessa Street, Falls, Belfast, as an alleged informer.
- 28 September: a RUC officer (Alexander Beck) was killed in an IRA rocket attack on a British patrol on Glen Road, Andersonstown, Belfast.
- 3 October: the hunger strike was called off, due to pressure from the remaining strikers' families who made it clear they would seek medical intervention to save their sons' lives.
- 5 October: an ex-Ulster Defence Regiment (UDR) officer (Hector Hall) was shot dead by the IRA outside Altnagelvin Hospital, County Londonderry.
- 10 October: a nail-bomb blast at Ebury Bridge Road, Chelsea, London, near Chelsea Barracks killed two people (John Patrick Breslin and Nora Fields) and injured 40, including 23 soldiers, two children, and one guardsman who lost the sight of one eye.
- 17 October: Commandant General Royal Marines, Lieutenant-General Steuart Pringle lost a leg when an IRA car bomb attached to his car exploded outside his home in Dulwich, South London.
- 21 October: an off-duty UDR soldier (Julian Connolly) was shot dead outside his home at the Zoological Gardens, Antrim Road, Bellevue, Belfast.
- 26 October: a bomb exploded at a Wimpy Bar in Oxford Street, London, killing a bomb disposal officer (Kenneth Howorth) trying to defuse it.
- 9 November: an off-duty UDR soldier (Cecil Graham) was shot and wounded by the IRA while leaving relative's home in Lisnaskea, County Fermanagh. Graham died two days later.
- 10 November: the IRA shot dead an ex-UDR officer (Charles Neville) as he left his workplace, Industrial Estate, Loughgall Road, Armagh town.
- 12 November: a RUC officer lost both his legs when an IRA booby-trap bomb exploded underneath his car in Banbridge, County Down.
- 13 November: the home of the Attorney General for England and Wales and Attorney General for Northern Ireland, Sir Michael Havers, Woodhayes Road, Wimbledon, London, was bombed by the IRA. No one was injured as Havers and his family were in Spain at the time of the attack. However, a police constable standing guard outside the home was taken to hospital suffering from shock.
- 14 November: the IRA killed Ulster Unionist Party MP Rev Robert Bradford, at Community Centre, Finaghy, Belfast, along with another man (Kenneth Campbell), who was the caretaker of the premises. Irish Taoiseach Dr Garret FitzGerald, and former Taoiseach and opposition leader Charles Haughey, both condemned the killings in the Dáil Éireann. Social Democratic and Labour Party (SDLP) leader John Hume accused the IRA of waging a campaign of "sectarian genocide".
- 17 November: a UDR soldier (Albert Beacom) and an RUC officer (Silas Lyttle) died from separate IRA attacks. Beacom was shot at his farm, Maguiresbridge, County Fermanagh. Lyttle died two months after being shot outside his shop, Ballygawley, County Tyrone.
- 18 November: an ex-Ulster Defence Regiment soldier (James McClintock) was shot dead by the IRA while on his way home from work, Newbuildings, County Londonderry.
- 19 November: a UDR soldier (John McKeegan) was shot dead by the IRA while delivering wood, Olympic Drive, Ballycolman, Strabane, County Tyrone.
- 28 November: a RUC officer (William Coulter) was killed by a remote controlled bomb hidden behind fencing as he patrolled Unity Flats, Peter's Hill, Belfast.
- Exact date unknown: Danny McIlhone, a Catholic civilian, was abducted by the IRA in Belfast during 1981. His remains eventually found, on general instructions from the IRA, buried in Ballynultagh, near Blessington, County Wicklow, on 8 November 2008.
- 23 December: the IRA launched a Mortar attack on Belleek RUC station in Fermanagh, the attack was launched from a lorry parked in a hotel car park nearby. Some damage was done to the station but there were no serious injuries.

== 1982 ==
- 1 January: a Protestant civilian (Samuel Pollock) was killed by a booby-trap bomb while entering the car of an off-duty UDR soldier's car in Newcastle, County Down.
- 8 January: an off-duty UDR soldier (Steven Carleton) was shot dead while working at petrol station, Antrim Road, Belfast.
- 19 January: John Torbitt, an alleged informant, died three weeks after being shot by the IRA at his home in Lenadoon, Belfast.
- 5 March: Seamus Morgan, an alleged informant, was shot dead by the IRA in Forkill, County Armagh.
- 11 March: a former UDR soldier (Norman Hanna) was shot dead by the IRA outside his workplace in Rathfriland, County Down.
- 15 March: the IRA detonated a large car-bomb on Bridge Street, Banbridge, County Down following a warning to evacuate the area. A Protestant civilian (Alan McCrum, 11) was killed.
- 23 March: a British coal ship, St. Bedan, was bombed and sunk by an IRA unit while at anchor in Lough Foyle.
- 25 March: three British soldiers (Daniel Holland, Nicholas Malakos, and Anthony Rapley) were killed and five other people injured in an IRA gun attack on Crocus Street, off the Springfield Road in West Belfast.
- 28 March: an RUC officer (Norman Duddy) was shot dead by the IRA shortly after leaving church, Patrick Street, off Strand Road, Derry.
- 1 April: two British soldiers (Michael Burbridge and Michael Ward) were killed in an IRA sniper ambush shortly after leaving Rosemount British Army/Royal Ulster Constabulary base, Derry, traveling in a British Army van.
- 2 April: a RUC officer (David Brown) was badly wounded after being shot while travelling to New Barnsley British Army/Royal Ulster Constabulary base, Springfield Crescent, off Springfield Road, West Belfast. He died of his injuries two weeks later, on 16 April.
- 3 April: Patrick Scott, an alleged informant, was found shot dead by the IRA in the Lower Falls area of Belfast.
- 17 April: William Morrison, a Protestant civilian, was shot dead by the IRA at his farm at Middletown, County Armagh.
- 20 April: the IRA launched a massive bombing offensive in Northern Ireland. A bank in Strabane was hit by a 900 kg carbomb; a garage and car showroom in Armagh was destroyed by three firebombs; a car bomb exploded at the Linen Hall in Ballymena; a 900 kg carbomb exploded in Derry and another 900 kg device was detonated in Bessbrook followed by a smaller 40 kg device which detonated in Bessbrook some hours later, and finally another car bombing in Magherafelt which killed two Protestant civilians (Noel McCulloch and Wilbert Kennedy).
- 22 April: Raymond Devlin, an alleged criminal, was shot dead by the IRA at his home in Andersontown, Belfast.
- 27 April: an off-duty UDR soldier (Leslie Hamilton) was shot dead in an IRA gun attack while delivering bread to Long's Supermarket, Lisnagelvin, County Londonderry.
- 30 April: a British soldier (Colin Clifford) was killed when the vehicle in which he was traveling struck an IRA landmine, Meenatully, near Belleek, County Fermanagh.
- 4 May: a RUC officer (Samuel Caskey) was shot dead in an IRA sniper attack on RUC foot patrol, The Diamond, Derry.
- 12 May: an ex-UDR soldier (Thomas Cunningham) was shot dead in Fountain Park, Strabane, County Tyrone
- 11 June: an RUC officer (David Reeves) was killed by an IRA booby trap bomb while searching a garage, Carranbane Walk, Shantallow, County Londonderry.
- 15 June: an off-duty UDR soldier was shot dead by the IRA in Strabane, County Tyrone.
- 18 June: a former RUC officer and current civilian RUC employee (Albert White) was shot dead by the IRA while driving his car in Newry, County Down.
- 28 June: over thirty homes were damaged after the IRA exploded a 1,000 lb (450 kg) carbomb in the Springfield Road area of West Belfast.
- 20 July: the Hyde Park and Regents Park bombings: In Hyde Park, a bomb killed four members (Raymond Bright, Anthony Daly, Simon Tipper, and Vernon Young) of the British Army's Household Cavalry performing ceremonial duties in the park, and seven horses died or had to be put down. Another device exploded underneath a bandstand in Regent's Park, killing seven bandsmen (Graham Barker, John Heritage, Robert Livingstone, John McKnight, George Mesure, Keith Powell and Laurence Smith) from the British Army's Royal Green Jackets as they played music to spectators.
- 20 July: the IRA scored several hits on a British Army helicopter in an attack involving an M60 machine gun near Crossmaglen, County Armagh.
- 27 July: IRA volunteers fired machine-guns and a rocket at two RUC Land Rovers from an occupied house in West Belfast. Four RUC officers were hurt.
- 9 August: there was a half hour gun battle between the IRA and British Army after a suspected bomb at Kilnasaggart Bridge, County Armagh disrupted train services.
- 25 August: an IRA member (Eamon Bradley) was shot dead by the British Army after leaving a pub on Racecourse Road, Derry.
- 27 August: a former UDR soldier (Wilfred McIlveen) was killed by a booby-trap bomb under his car in Milford, County Armagh.
- 28 August: 24 buses were firebombed by the IRA at the Ulsterbus depot in County Armagh.
- 20 September: a British soldier (Martin Jessop) was killed when an IRA unit fired a rocket at his observation post at Springfield Road British Army barracks in Belfast.
- 1 October: a RUC officer (John Eagleson) was shot dead by the IRA while travelling on his motorcycle to work, Drum Manor, near Cookstown, County Tyrone.
- 5 October: an off-duty RUC Reservist (Charles Crother) was shot dead by the IRA at his workplace in Altnagelvin, Derry.
- 14 October: the IRA carried out a bomb attack on a British Army foot-patrol in the Ballymurphy area of Belfast.
- 22 October: an off-duty UDR soldier (Thomas Cochrane) was kidnapped while travelling to work, Glennane, near Markethill, County Armagh. Found shot dead at Lislea, near Camlough, County Armagh, seven days later on 29 October 1982.
- 27 October: three RUC officers (Paul Hamilton, Alan McCloy, and Sean Quinn) were killed in an IRA landmine attack on their armoured patrol vehicle at Oxford Island, near Lurgan, County Armagh.
- 30 October: an IRA rocket hit an armoured vehicle carrying 12 British soldiers and RUC officers on Lower Falls Road, Belfast. No injuries were reported.
- 9 November: a RUC officer (Garry Ewing) and a civilian (Helen Woodhouse) were killed by a booby trap bomb attached to the car in which they were driving, which had been parked outside Lakeland Forum Leisure Centre, Enniskillen, County Fermanagh.
- 10 November: an off-duty UDR soldier (Charles Spence) was shot dead by the IRA shortly after leaving his workplace, the Customs Office, Armagh town.
- 11 November: three IRA volunteers (Sean Burns, Gervaise McKerr, and Eugene Toman) were shot dead in an undercover RUC ambush at a vehicle check point (VCP) at Tullygalley East Road, Craigavon, County Armagh.
- 16 November: the IRA killed UVF leader Lenny Murphy outside his girlfriend's house in Forthriver Park, Belfast. Murphy, who had been responsible for up to 20 sectarian killings which were carried out by his Shankill Butchers gang, was shot over 20 times at close range by two IRA volunteers.
- 27 November: the IRA shot dead a former RUC officer (John Martin) at his garage in Armagh, County Armagh.
- 19 December: an off-duty UDR soldier (Austin Smith) was shot dead by the IRA outside his home, Windmill Avenue, Armagh town.

== 1983 ==
- 6 January: two RUC officers (Eric Brown and Brian Quinn) on patrol were shot dead by the IRA while sitting in a stationary RUC civilian-type car, Bridge Street, Rostrevor, County Down.
- 16 January: William Doyle, a judge, was shot dead by the IRA in Belfast after attending Sunday Mass at St Brigid's Roman Catholic Church, Derryvolgie Avenue, Malone, Belfast. A companion in his car escaped serious injury.
- 18 January: an off-duty RUC officer (John Olphert) was shot dead by the IRA at his supermarket, Nelson Drive, Caw, Derry.
- 27 January: the IRA's West Tyrone Brigade detonated a 300 lb car bomb outside Sion Mills RUC station, nobody was hurt but the station was badly damaged and had its roof blown off. Some nearby buildings were slightly damaged.
- 19 February: a civilian (Alan Price) was shot dead by the IRA while delivering mail, Arney, near Enniskillen, County Fermanagh. The usual postman, an off-duty Ulster Defence Regiment member, was the intended target.
- 20 February: a RUC officer (Edward Magill) was shot dead while standing outside the Warrenpoint Royal Ulster Constabulary base, County Down, by the IRA in a drive-by shooting.
- 21 February: a RUC officer (Gordon Wilson) on foot-patrol was killed by an IRA remote controlled bomb, hidden in derelict building, while on RUC foot patrol, Lower English Street, Armagh town.
- 25 February: an off-duty UDR soldier (Cecil McNeill) was shot dead by the IRA at his workplace, Ballygawley, County Tyrone.
- 2 March: a RUC officer (Lindsay McCormack) was shot dead by an IRA sniper while on foot-patrol, Serpentine Road, Greencastle, Belfast.
- 15 March: an off-duty RUC officer (Frederick Morton) was shot dead during an IRA ambush while driving his bread van, Tandragee Road, Newry, County Down.
- 17 March: the IRA launched a gun and rocket attack on a British mobile patrol in Ballymurphy, Belfast.
- 18 March: a British soldier was badly wounded after his Saracen armoured vehicle was hit with an IRA rocket in Ballymurphy, Belfast. The vehicle was sprayed with machine gun fire before the IRA unit escaped.
- 25 March: Brian Stack, an officer at Portlaoise Prison, was shot in the neck on South Circular Road, Dublin after leaving the National Stadium. He was hospitalised with severe brain damage and died on 29 September 1984.
- 31 March: the IRA carried out a bomb attack on a British patrol in the Falls Road, Falls, Belfast. One British soldier (Gerald Jeffrey) was badly injured and died of his wounds eight days later, on 7 April.
- 9 April: an off-duty British soldier (Richard Biddle) was killed by a booby trap bomb attached to his car in a car park off High Street, Omagh, County Tyrone.
- 13 April: an off-duty British Territorial Army soldier (Trevor Elliott) was shot dead by the IRA at his shop, Keady, County Armagh.
- 12 May: two British soldiers were injured when the IRA attempted to shoot down a Wessex helicopter in South Armagh.
- 16 May: an RUC officer (Gerald Cathcart) was shot dead by the IRA outside his home, Linkview Park, Malone, Belfast.
- 24 May: Andersonstown British Army barracks was devastated when the IRA detonated a massive van-bomb outside the front gate.
- 10 June: a British soldier (Geoffrey Curtis) was killed when the IRA detonated a remote controlled bomb hidden in a lamp-post when a British Army foot patrol passed, Glenalina Road, Ballymurphy, Belfast.
- 22 June: the IRA attempted to shoot down a Wessex helicopter with a battery of Mark 10 mortars over Crossmaglen, County Armagh. The pilot was forced to undertake an evasive manoeuvre, dropping the helicopter's cargo into the street below. Four mortars failed to explode and the rest landed in the vicinity of the base, causing some damage and slightly injuring a British soldier. A subsequent investigation found that if the mortar base plate had been aligned "five to ten degrees" differently the projectiles likely would have hit the helicopter.
- 13 July: four UDR soldiers (Ronald Alexander, Thomas Harron, Oswell Neely, and John Roxborough) were killed in a land mine attack while on mobile patrol, near Ballygawley, County Tyrone.
- 10 August: Fort Pegasus British Army base in Belfast came under heavy machine gun fire from a number of IRA units. On the Whiterock road a British Army land-rover was hit by IRA sniper fire
- 23 August: an off-duty UDR soldier (Ronald Finlay) was shot dead as he left his workplace in Strabane, County Tyrone.
- 24 August: a Protestant shopkeeper (William Young) was shot dead following an altercation with an IRA unit at his shop, Magazine Street, Derry.
- 19 September: Lilly McCollum, a Protestant civilian, died two months after being injured by a booby trap bomb, hidden in outbuilding at her Ulster Defence Regiment member brother's farm, Tullylagen, near Cookstown, County Tyrone. She was injured on 9 July 1983. Two of her grandsons, Reginald and Nigel, both soldiers, would also be killed in the Troubles more than a decade later.
- 20 September: an ex-Ulster Defence Regiment soldier (John Truckle) was killed by a booby trap bomb attached to his car outside his home, Woodside Hill, Portadown, County Armagh.
- 25 September: 38 IRA prisoners took part in the Maze Prison escape. A guard (James Ferris) died of a heart attack after being stabbed during the escape, and six others were injured when shot or stabbed. Half were recaptured in a short period of time, and several others were eventually recaptured. One escapee died while trying to swim to safety. Others were never recaptured, finding haven in the Republic of Ireland or the United States until the cessation of hostilities after which some returned home.
- 6 October: two RUC officers (James Ferguson and William Finlay) were shot dead in an IRA ambush on their foot patrol, Meadowlands, Downpatrick, County Down.
- 10 October: a Catholic civilian (Sean McShane), mistaken for an off-duty RUC officer, was shot dead by the IRA while in bookmaker's shop, Monaghan Street, Newry, County Down.
- 15 October: a British soldier was killed when the IRA detonated a bomb as a British mobile patrol passed in the Creggan area of Derry.
- 24 October: an off-duty UDR soldier (Cyrus Campbell) was shot dead by the IRA while driving car at his farm, Carricklongfield, near Aughnacloy, Tyrone.
- 28 October: a RUC officer (John Hallawell) was shot dead by the IRA in Sheelin Park, Ballymagroarty, Derry.
- 31 October: Three RUC constables were wounded in an ambush carried out by an IRA unit that opened fire on their mobile patrol from a van on Ballymoyer Road, between Whitecross and Newtownhamilton, south County Armagh.
- 4 November: the IRA detonated a time-bomb hidden in the ceiling of a classroom, which exploded during a lecture to Royal Ulster Constabulary members, Ulster Polytechnic, Jordanstown, County Antrim. Two of the RUC officers (Stephen Fyfe and John Martin) giving a lecture at the time died instantly, another (William McDonald) died of his injuries on 12 August 1984.
- 5 November: an off-duty RUC officer (John McFadden) was shot dead by the IRA outside his home, Bamford Park, Rasharkin, County Antrim.
- 7 November: a British soldier (Stephen Taverner) died on this date, two weeks after being injured by a remote controlled bomb while on foot patrol, Crossmaglen, County Armagh.
- 10 November: an off-duty RUC officer (William Fitzpatrick) was shot dead in an IRA gun attack in Ballymartin, County Down.
- 12 November: a RUC officer (Paul Clarke) was killed and several others were injured in an IRA mortar bomb attack on Carrickmore British Army/Royal Ulster Constabulary base, County Tyrone.
- 14 November: Charles Armstrong, a UDR soldier and Ulster Unionist Party councilor, was killed by an IRA booby-trap bomb attached to his car outside the District Council offices in Armagh town.
- 4 December: two IRA volunteers (Colm McGirr and Brian Campbell) were shot dead by the British Army in Coalisland, County Tyrone.
- 7 December: Ulster Unionist Party MLA Edgar Graham was shot dead outside Queen's University Belfast.
- 10 December: an IRA bomb exploded at the Royal Artillery Barracks in London, injuring three people.
- 16 December: an Irish Army soldier (Patrick Kelly) and a Garda officer (Gary Sheehan) were both shot dead during a gun battle with the Irish Republican Army in an attempt to secure the release of businessman Don Tidey, taken hostage by the IRA, near Ballinamore, County Leitrim, Republic of Ireland.
- 17 December: an IRA car bomb exploded in the centre of Omagh, County Tyrone. It caused an estimated £1000,000 worth of damage and left an eight-foot crater. An SDLP councillor claimed it was a "miracle" there were no fatalities; a worker in a shop close to the blast site was caught in debris.
- 17 December: an off-duty UDR soldier (Brown McKeown) was shot dead by the IRA at his shop, Maghera, County Londonderry.
- 17 December: the Harrods bombing in London killed six people including three police officers (Philip Geddes, Jasmine Cochrane-Patrick, Kenneth Salvesen (a US citizen), Sergeant Noel Lane, Constable Jane Arbuthnot and Inspector Stephen Dodd), and injured 75 other people. Constable Jon Gordon survived, but lost both legs and part of a hand in the blast.

== 1984 ==
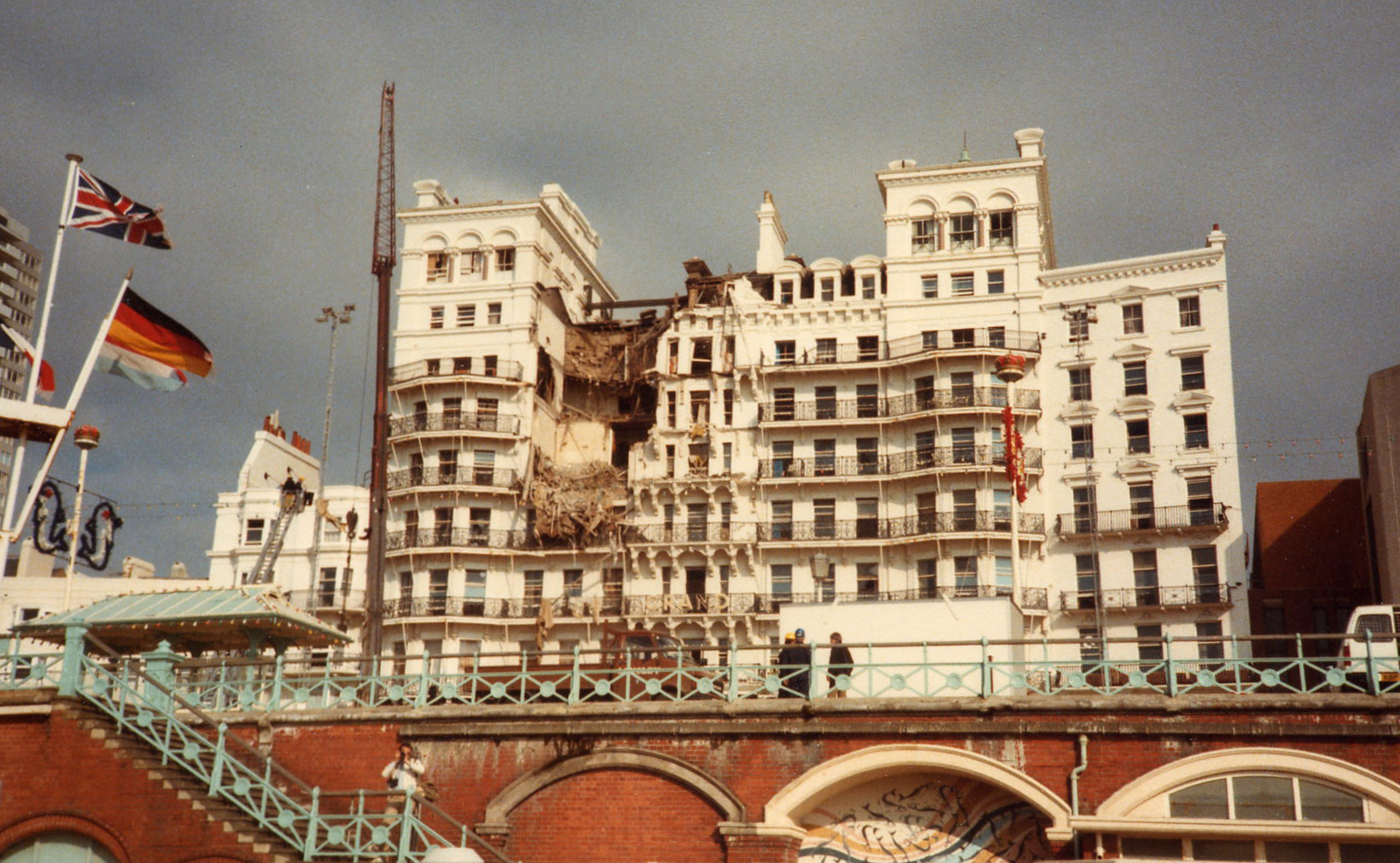
Brighton's Grand Hotel after the October 1984 bombing by the IRA

- 2 January: an off-duty UDR soldier (Robert Elliott) was shot dead outside his home, Lislaird Road, Castlederg, County Tyrone.
- 10 January: an off-duty RUC officer (William Fullerton) was shot dead by an IRA sniper while driving his car along Warrenpoint Road, Newry, County Down.
- 23 January: a bomb targeting a British Army patrol injured one soldier and 3 civilians on Clonard Street, West Belfast.
- 31 January: two RUC officers (William Savage and Thomas Bingham) were killed in an IRA land mine attack on a Royal Ulster Constabulary armoured patrol car, Drumintee Road, near Forkill, County Armagh.
- 10 February: an IRA unit fired a rocket at a British Army Saracen armoured vehicle in Glenalina Park, Belfast. The rocket bounced off the front of the vehicle and landed in a school. There were no injuries.
- 13 February: James Young was shot dead by the IRA as an alleged informer, Blaney Road, near Crossmaglen, County Armagh.
- 20 February: a factory in Armagh City was destroyed by a bomb.
- 25 February: a 1000-pound bomb was left in a culvert near Cookstown, Country Tyrone. The device was later defused.
- 21 February: two IRA volunteers (Henry Hogan and Declan Martin) and a British soldier (Paul Oram) were killed in a gun battle at Dunloy, near Ballymoney, County Antrim.
- 2 March: an off-duty UDR soldier (Thomas Loughlin) was killed by a booby trap bomb attached to his van, outside his home, Castlederg, County Tyrone.
- 3 March: Herbert Burrows was killed by a booby-trap bomb attached to a garage door at his workplace on Alexander Road, Armagh town. The IRA claimed responsibility and said he was a serving member of the UDR, but he is listed as a civilian at CAIN.
- 6 March: William McConnell, then Assistant Governor of the Maze Prison, was shot dead by the IRA outside his home in East Belfast.
- 8 March: an off-duty UDR soldier (David Montgomery) was shot dead by the IRA at his workplace, a petrol station, Airport Road, near Moira, County Down.
- 10 March: RUC officers guarding a Loyalist march in Derry came under fire from a Republican gunman. There were no injuries.
- 13 March: an ex-UDR soldier (Ronald Funston) was shot dead by the IRA at his farm, Lowery, near Pettigoe, County Fermanagh.
- 19 March: a part-time UDR soldier was seriously wounded by two gunmen after being shot at the blood transfusion centre where he worked.
- 27 March: a British soldier (David Ross) was killed by an IRA remote controlled bomb, hidden in a parked van, which detonated when a British Army civilian-type mini bus passed by, near Gransha Hospital, Clooney Road, Derry.
- 8 April: an IRA unit carried out a gun attack on Thomas Travers, then a Resident Magistrate, outside St Brigid's Catholic Church in Belfast after Sunday Mass. Judge Travers was badly injured and his daughter Mary was killed by a ricochet bullet.
- 11 April: a former UDR soldier was badly injured when a bomb exploded underneath his car in Belfast.
- 14 April: a British soldier was badly injured when he was shot in the face by IRA volunteers in an attack in Glasdrumman, South Armagh.
- 16 April: IRA volunteers shot and badly injured a civilian in Derry City. The IRA later apologised, saying the civilian had been mistaken for an undercover British soldier.
- 19 April: a soldier was wounded after being shot on foot patrol in West Belfast.
- 21 April: an IRA unit launched a remote-controlled bomb attack against a British patrol in Foyle Street, Derry City. Three British soldiers were injured and an IRA volunteer (Richard Quigley) was killed by shrapnel from the explosion.
- 23 April: bombers had dropped sweet-jars filled with petrol on two Army Land Rovers in Derry. As the soldiers began fleeing the IRA opened fire, killing one soldier and injuring five.
- 8 May: an off-duty UDR soldier (James Johnstone) was shot dead by the IRA in the car park of his workplace, Drumglass Hospital, Dungannon, County Tyrone.
- 9 May: an off-duty British Army Territorial Army soldier (Trevor May) was killed by an IRA booby trap bomb while travelling in his car shortly after leaving his workplace, Telephone Exchange, Downshire Road, Newry, County Down.
- 12 May: an off-duty UDR soldier (Ivan Hillen) was shot dead by the IRA at his farm in Lismore, near Augher, County Tyrone.
- 16 May: three RUC officers escaped serious injury after their patrol car was hit by a large IRA landmine in County Armagh.
- 18 May: two RUC officers (Trevor Elliott and Neville Gray) were killed when the IRA exploded a landmine as their armoured patrol car traveled in Lislea, near Camlough, County Armagh.
- 18 May: two off-duty British soldiers (Thomas Agar and Robert Huggins) were killed, and another (Peter Gallimore) died 11 days later as a result of his injuries, after the IRA planted a booby trap bomb under their car, outside the Lakeland Forum Leisure Centre, Enniskillen, County Fermanagh.
- 29 May: a British soldier (Stephen Anderson) was killed in an IRA landmine attack, Mounthill, near Crossmaglen, County Armagh. That same day, an IRA bomb on the Whiterock Road in Belfast was defused by the British Army.
- 3 June: a taxi driver and ex-UDR soldier (Hugh Gallagher) was shot dead by the IRA; his body was found in his car, Faccary Road, Loughmacrory, near Omagh, County Tyrone.
- 4 June: an off-duty UDR soldier (David Chambers) was shot dead by an IRA sniper at Dollingstown, near Lurgan, County Down, while motorcycling to his workplace.
- 9 June: an alleged criminal (James Campbell) was shot dead by the IRA inside the Pound Loney Social Club, Conway Street, Lower Falls, Belfast.
- 11 June: a taxi-driver and former UDR soldier was lured and shot dead by the Provisional IRA East Tyrone Brigade off the main Omagh to Cookstown road. RUC detectives believe that the tax-driver died in a burst of automatic fire and his foot jammed on the accelerator, sending the car crashing into a gate post, where his body was found.
- 22 June: a British soldier was badly injured when he was shot in the neck by an IRA sniper on the Whiterock Road in Belfast.
- 2 July: an IRA unit fired an RPG7 rocket at an RUC Land Rover patrol but missed in Ballygawley, County Tyrone.
- 13 July: an IRA volunteer (William Price) was shot dead by the British Army during an attempted incendiary bomb attack on a factory in Ardboe, County Tyrone.
- 14 July: two UDR soldiers (Heather Kerrigan and Norman McKinley), from an eight-member foot patrol, were killed in a 200 lb (91 kg) IRA landmine attack near the border at Second Corgary, near Castlederg, County Tyrone. Detectives believed the bomb was triggered a few hundred yards across the border. Immediately after the explosion, gunmen opened fire on the foot patrol as colleagues radioed for help. The West Tyrone Brigade of the IRA claimed responsibility for the attack.
- 26 July: Brian McNally was found shot dead at Meigh, County Armagh. He was killed by the IRA as an alleged informer.
- 8 August: an IRA volunteer (Brendan Watters), died when a bomb he was handling prematurely detonated inside a house in Barcroft Park, Newry, County Down.
- 10 August: a Garda officer (Francis Hand) was shot dead by the IRA in Drumcree, County Meath during an attempted armed robbery of a post office.
- 12 August: a RUC officer (Malcolm White) was killed in a land mine attack on an RUC mobile patrol, Crockanboy, Greencastle, County Tyrone.
- 7 September: an UDR soldier (Robert Bennett) and a Protestant civilian (Malcolm Cullen) were shot dead at their workplace, a timber yard, Ballygawley Road, Dungannon, County Tyrone.
- 11 September: a police officer was seriously wounded after being shot while driving in Derry.
- 29 September: the fishing vessel Marita Ann was intercepted by the Irish Navy vessels the LÉ Emer and the LÉ Aisling off the south coast of County Kerry en route from Boston with seven tons of explosives, firearms and ammunition, as well as medications, training manuals, and communications equipment on board. The crew were arrested. On 11 December 1984, Martin Ferris and two other members of the Marita Ann crew, including Browne and a United States citizen, John Crawley, were sentenced to ten years imprisonment at Portlaoise Prison.
- 8 October: an ex-Ulster Defence Regiment soldier (Melvin Simpson), was shot dead by the IRA at his workplace, a building site on Ann Street, Dungannon, County Tyrone.
- 12 October: Brighton hotel bombing: a bomb in the Grand Hotel killed five in a failed attempt to assassinate members of the British cabinet. Prime Minister Margaret Thatcher narrowly escaped death. Several others including Margaret Tebbit, wife of Norman Tebbit, were left permanently disabled.
- 19 October: a British soldier (Timothy Utteridge) was shot dead by an IRA sniper while on foot patrol, Norglen Road, Turf Lodge, Belfast.
- 2 December: two IRA volunteers (Antoine MacGiolla Bhrighde and Kieran Fleming) and one SAS member (Alistair Slater) were killed in the Kesh ambush after an attempted IRA bombing, Drumrush, near Kesh, County Fermanagh. Fleming drowned in the Bannagh River, near Kesh, after escaping from the gun battle. His body found in the river on 21 December 1984.
- 6 December: two members of the IRA (Daniel Doherty and William Fleming) were shot dead by undercover British soldiers while travelling on motorcycle in the grounds of Gransha Hospital, off Clooney Road, Derry.
- 16 December: a large bomb destroyed several homes and businesses in Holywood, County Down. No one was injured.
- 17 December: an IRA volunteer (Sean McIlvenna) was killed by the RUC after trying to carry out a bomb attack against a British Army patrol near Blackwatertown, County Armagh.

== 1985 ==
- 11 January: the IRA injured RUC officers in a bomb attack in County Armagh.
- 1 February: the IRA shot dead a UDR soldier (James Graham) in Derrylin, County Fermanagh. He had been driving a bus when an IRA volunteer shot him seven times through the front windscreen. Two other gunmen then entered the bus and shot him a further 24 times at point blank range. Ulster Unionist MP Ken Maginnis stated that this was a "genocide – a conscious effort by the IRA to systematically wipe out Protestant families in the community". The statement referred to the fact that two of Graham's brothers, also UDR soldiers, had been killed by the IRA in 1981.
- 4 February: an RUC officer survived an IRA attack in County Fermanagh.
- 8 February: an IRA landmine failed to injure three RUC officers in County Tyrone.
- 17 February: a prison officer (Patrick Kerr) was shot dead by the IRA as he was leaving Saint Patrick's Cathedral, Armagh town. He was shot three times in the head at point-blank range.
- 21 February: a RUC officer (Francis Murphy) was killed when the IRA ambushed his vehicle at Drumsallen, near Armagh town. Three gunmen attacked the vehicle with machine guns. They had taken over a house on the road and had been lying in wait. The unit fired 36 shots.
- 23 February: Charles Breslin and two other IRA volunteers (Michael Devine and David Devine) were shot dead in a British Army/SAS ambush in Strabane, County Tyrone. Two other IRA volunteers managed to escape. The men were returning weapons to an arms dump when they were shot.
- 23 February: a civilian (Kevin Coyle) from Derry was shot dead by the IRA at Corporation Street, Bogside, as an alleged British informant.
- 28 February: nine RUC officers (including a Chief Inspector) were killed after an IRA unit launched a mortar attack on an RUC base in Newry, County Armagh. 37 people (including civilians) were also injured.
- 28 February: a UDR soldier (Trevor Harkness) was killed by an IRA booby-trap bomb hidden in a telegraph pole in Pomeroy, County Tyrone. Two other UDR soldiers were injured.
- 3 March: an RUC officer (Hugh McCormac) was shot dead by the IRA outside St Gabriel's Roman Catholic Church, Graan, near Enniskillen, County Fermanagh. The officer was exiting his vehicle when he was hit by a number of bullets. As he lay wounded a gunman ran up and fired a number of shots into him at point blank range.
- 12 March: an IRA bomb attack in Newry town centre caused £100,000 worth of damage.
- 23 March: an alleged Garda informant (John Corcoran) was shot dead by the IRA at Ballincollig, County Cork, Republic of Ireland. Sean O'Callaghan, a Garda informant himself, claimed in an interview with a local newspaper that he had shot the man but later retracted this.
- 27 March: a British soldier (Anthony Dacre) was killed in an IRA bomb attack while patrolling Divis Flats, Belfast. The killing was strongly condemned by the Irish government due to the fact that the attack took place in the centre of a heavily populated high rise flat complex.
- 29 March: an RUC reservist (John Bell) was shot dead by the IRA while working in a garage in Church Square, Rathfriland, County Down. Two gunmen approached him and shot him three times at point blank range before escaping.
- 3 April: a Royal Ulster Constabulary officer (Michael Kay) and a British security officer (Kenneth Parry) who worked at the court were both killed when an IRA remote controlled bomb, hidden in a parked car, detonated when a patrol passed outside the Newry courthouse, Downshire Road.
- 12 April: an IRA unit carried out a gun and grenade attack on an RUC Land Rover in the Markets area of Belfast.
- 3 May: the IRA shot dead a former Ulster Special Constabulary officer (William Heenan) at his home in Leitrim, near Castlewellan, County Down. The IRA claimed the man was an RUC reservist and had been seen regularly at roadblocks. However, the RUC denied this and he is listed as a civilian by CAIN.
- 11 May: a bomb intended for the security forces in the Poleglass area of Belfast failed to detonate and sat unattended for nearly two days. The IRA said a fault developed in the remote control mechanism.
- 20 May: four RUC officers (David Baird, Tracy Doak, Stephen Rodgers, and William Wilson) were killed by an IRA remote-controlled bomb in Killeen, County Armagh while serving as part of a police escort for an armoured car transporting £2 million from Dublin to Belfast. The escort had just met the security van on the border when the first armour plated RUC vehicle was hit by a 1,000 lb (450 kg) roadside bomb. The vehicle was completely destroyed.
- 28 May: a civilian (Gary Smith) who had just applied to join the RUC was shot dead by the IRA as he parked his car in Millfield, Belfast.
- 14 June: the IRA wounded an RUC officer in an attack in Newry, County Armagh.
- 14 June: a 1,000 lb (450 kg) IRA bomb exploded in the centre of Belfast causing severe damage.
- 15 June: a RUC officer (Willis Agnew) was shot dead in an IRA gun attack while sitting in a stationary car outside friend's home, Gortin Road, Kilrea, County Londonderry. An IRA volunteer fired through the windscreen with a revolver. The IRA man then opened the driver seat door and beat the officer over the head with the revolver before shooting him again at point blank range.
- 18 June: an undercover RUC officer (William Gilliland) was killed after his patrol vehicle struck an IRA landmine at Coragh Glebe, near Kinawley, County Fermanagh. Another RUC officer was badly injured.
- 23 June: four mortars exploded in Crossmaglen British Army base, although no injuries were reported. The IRA claimed responsibility.
- 2 July: Fort Pegasus British Army base in Belfast was mortared by an IRA unit. The barracks kitchen was hit by an IRA missile and completely destroyed. There were no injuries as it was empty at the time.
- 2 July: the British Army defused a 1,000 lb (450 kg) van bomb in Newry, County Down.
- 5 July: seven people were injured after an IRA van bomb exploded along the border next to the Lifford-Strabane bridge, County Tyrone. An RUC Land Rover was destroyed in the blast.
- 29 July: the IRA exploded a van bomb in Chichester Street in Belfast city centre, slightly injuring an RUC officer and wrecking several buildings including Belfast magistrates court.
- 31 July: the IRA detonated a car bomb in the centre of Ballynahinch, County Down causing extensive damage.
- 2 August: a British soldier was injured in an IRA bomb attack in South Armagh.
- 3 August: four 45 lb (20 kg) mortar bombs were defused outside Newry RUC station, site of the February mortar attack which killed nine officers.
- 6 August: an IRA volunteer (Charles English), was killed during an engagement with an RUC patrol in Derry when a home made rocket launcher jammed and then exploded as he tried to fire it. Another IRA volunteer was injured but managed to escape.
- 7 August: an IRA van bomb destroyed a creamery at Newtownhamilton, County Armagh.
- 7 August: the first of four Libyan shipments of weaponry to the IRA is landed by the trawler Casamara at Clogga Strand, near Wicklow, Republic of Ireland, with 10 tonnes of weaponry consisting of AK-47 rifles, RPG launchers, hand grenades, revolvers and ammunition. Another 14 tonnes were delivered on 2 October.
- 8 August: the IRA bombed a golf club in Ballycastle, County Antrim.
- 20 August: a civilian (Seamus McEvoy) who worked as a contractor to the British Army was shot dead by the IRA at his home Eglinton Road, Donnybrook, Dublin. The man's family owned Roughan Castle and a 300-acre (1.2 km^{2}) estate outside Coalisland. The IRA said he was killed because he supplied building materials to British forces, and claimed he had been given previous warnings.
- 20 August: a van fitted with mortar launchers exploded 100 yards from an RUC base in Newcastle, County Down. The mortars malfunctioned but four people were hurt.
- 22 August: a civilian (Daniel Mallon) was shot dead by the IRA while in Railway Bar, Strabane, County Tyrone. He was mistaken for contractor to the British Army/Royal Ulster Constabulary.
- 22 August: a 500 lb (230 kg) IRA bomb exploded next to an RUC station at Plumbridge, County Tyrone.
- 24 August: a civilian (Kieran Murray) was shot dead by an IRA sniper while travelling in a car along Slate Quarry Road, near Pomeroy, County Tyrone. His vehicle was mistaken for a Royal Ulster Constabulary (RUC) civilian-type car. The IRA admitted responsibility and extended "deepest sympathy to the family and friends of Kieran Murray". The dead man had aided Sinn Féin in local elections.
- 31 August: a RUC officer (Martin Vance) was shot dead by the IRA outside his home, Rocks Chapel Road, Crossgar, County Down. Sinn Féin objected to the decision of Down's district council to adjourn during the man's funeral as a mark of respect. In a statement the Sinn Féin councillors said: "We feel if the council is going to do this sort of thing then they should do it for all those who have lost their lives due to British occupation, and not just a select few."
- 4 September: the IRA launched a mortar attack against the RUC training centre in Enniskillen, County Fermanagh. Of eighteen projectiles fired, nine landed in the depot and two of these scored direct hits on the main depot building. 30 RUC cadets narrowly escaped death due to poor intelligence-gathering by the IRA unit responsible and twenty five people were injured. The cadets were expected to be in bed sleeping, but were instead eating breakfast when the bombs landed.
- 6 September: an RUC vehicle survived an IRA landmine attack near Warrenpoint, County Down.
- 8 September: a married couple (Gerard and Catherine Mahon) were found shot dead in the Turf Lodge area of Belfast. The IRA claimed the couple were British Army agents and responsible for the capture of a 30 lb (14 kg) bomb and the arrests of three INLA members. Ex-members of the British Military reportedly confirmed the two had been recruited by the Special Branch.
- 14 September: the IRA exploded a large car bomb at Market Street, Omagh, causing extensive damage to nearby buildings.
- 22 September: an off-duty British soldier (Martin Patten) was shot six times in the head by the IRA while he was returning from a disco to Ebrington British Army base, Derry, walking along Limavady Road, Waterside. Another soldier escaped uninjured.
- 26 September: the IRA bombed an RUC station at Ballinamallard, County Fermanagh. Eight people were injured.
- 28 September: the IRA bombed an RUC post at Shantallow, County Londonderry. Seven RUC officers were injured.
- 7 October: a civilian (Damien McCrory) was found shot dead by the side of the road, Drumrallagh, Strabane, County Tyrone, shot dead by the IRA, which claimed he was an informant and that he had admitted to working for the police for 13 months while under interrogation. The IRA also claimed McCrory had provided the SAS with intelligence which resulted in the deaths of three IRA volunteers in an ambush earlier that year.
- 7 October: a British army base in the Ballymurphy, West Belfast, was mortared by an IRA unit. The attack caused serious structural damage to the base and blew a large hole in the perimeter.
- 19 October: a 300 lb (140 kg) bomb exploded in the centre of Derry causing £1000,000 worth of damage.
- 15 November: a RUC officer (David Hanson) was killed and another soldier was badly wounded in a land mine attack on a joint British Army/Royal Ulster Constabulary foot patrol which had been deployed by helicopter, Blaney Road, near Crossmaglen, County Armagh.
- 18 November: a UDR soldier (Robert Boyd) was shot dead by the IRA outside his home, Prehen Park, Waterside, Derry.
- 21 November: a German businessman and contractor to the British Army (Kurt Konig) was shot dead outside his home, Gleneagle's, Shantallow, Derry City. He was shot 15 times as he was about to drive to work.
- 24 November: an IRA attempt to break out of Portlaoise Prison, County Laois failed. Gardaí arrested eleven men and firearms were recovered.
- 29 November: a UDR soldier (Gordon Hanna), employed as a contractor to the Royal Air Force, was killed when he triggered an IRA booby-trap bomb attached to his car outside his home, Harbour Drive, Kilkeel, County Down.
- 30 November: Edward Taggart was shot dead by the IRA in the Divis Flats complex in Belfast. The man was shot in the back and both legs. Taggart's family admitted he had been involved in joyriding activities and he had previously been imprisoned for joyriding offences.
- 6 December: a 500 lb (230 kg) IRA bomb heavily damaged an RUC station at Toome, County Antrim.
- 7 December: the IRA launched an assault on the RUC station in Ballygawley, County Tyrone, in which two RUC officers (Reserve Constable William Clements and Constable George Gilliland) were shot dead and the barracks completely destroyed (See:Attack on Ballygawley barracks).
- 9 December: IRA members in a car fired several bursts of automatic gunfire at the RUC base in Castledawson, County Londonderry. There were no reported injuries.
- 11 December: the IRA claimed responsibility for a mortar attack on an RUC base at Tynan, County Armagh in which four RUC officers were injured.
- 19 December: the RUC base in Castlederg, County Tyrone, was wrecked by a shell during a mortar attack carried out by the IRA. Seven people were injured, and about 250 families evacuated.
- 22 December: the IRA's East Tyrone Brigade carried out a mortar attack on Carrickmore's joint RUC & British Army base. Minor damage was caused to the base by a mortar shell and one soldier was injured.

== 1986 ==
- 1 January: two RUC officers (James McCandless and Michael Williams) were killed when the IRA detonated a remote-controlled bomb hidden in a litter bin as their patrol passed on Thomas Street, Armagh town.
- 13 January: the IRA's East Tyrone Brigade launched a second mortar attack on the Carrickmore RUC/British Army base in the space of three weeks, the mortar shell was fired over the roof of a house & landed in the RUC base causing minor damage & injuring a soldier.
- 15 January: an off-duty UDR soldier (Victor Foster) was killed when he triggered an IRA booby trap attached to his car outside his home, Gamble Park, Castlederg, County Tyrone.
- 15 January: a British soldier was injured in a shooting incident in the Lower Falls area of Belfast.
- 22 January: the IRA and British Army exchanged fire at Crossmaglen, County Armagh.
- 22 January: the IRA launched a mortar attack at the UDR base in Dungannon, County Tyrone, injuring two UDR soldiers and damaging the base.
- 1 February: the IRA detonated a bomb at an RUC station in Coalisland, County Tyrone. The building and surrounding houses were heavily damaged.
- 3 February: a UDR soldier (John Earley) was killed when the IRA detonated a remote-controlled bomb hidden in a dry stone wall as a foot patrol passed in Belcoo, County Fermanagh.
- 11 February: an off-duty RUC Detective-Constable (Derek Breen) and a Catholic barman (John McCabe) were killed in an IRA gun attack on the Talk of the Town Bar, Maguiresbridge, County Fermanagh. An IRA bomb exploded at the scene 40 minutes later.
- 17 February: a British soldier was injured in a landmine explosion near Crossmaglen, County Armagh.
- 22 February: an IRA active service unit launched a sniper attack on a Fort George British Army base in Derry. In the gun-battle which followed IRA volunteer Anthony Gough was killed and another IRA volunteer was captured.
- 18 March: a British soldier (David Mulley) was killed and several others wounded when the IRA detonated a booby-trap bomb concealed in a derelict building as a British Army foot patrol passed by in Castlewellan, County Down.
- 26 March: an off duty UDR soldier (Thomas Irwin) was shot dead by the IRA at his workplace near Omagh, County Tyrone. A lone IRA volunteer, not wearing a mask, approached him and shot him a number of times.
- 2 April: the IRA detonated a car bomb in Cappagh, County Tyrone.
- 8 April: a UDR soldier (William Pollock) was killed when he triggered an IRA booby-trap bomb attached to a trailer at his farm, off Ganvaghan Road, near Castlederg, County Tyrone.
- 23 April: an off-duty RUC officer (James Hazlett) was shot dead by the IRA outside his home, Bryansford Road, Newcastle, County Down. IRA volunteers opened fire on him from a wooded area on the opposite side of the road, hitting him a number of times. As he lay wounded they ran across the road and shot him at point blank range in the head.
- 26 April: the Special Air Service (SAS) killed IRA volunteer Séamus McElwaine in Roslea, County Fermanagh. At an inquest held in 1993, McElwaine was found to have been unlawfully killed. He had been shot in the back after being handcuffed. Another IRA volunteer was wounded and arrested.
- 28 April: an IRA bomb derailed a CIÉ goods train travelling from Dundalk to Belfast. The bomb exploded just after the train crossed the border at Kilnasaggart in South Armagh, throwing the middle wagons off the tracks.
- 3 May: a 400–500 lb (180–230 kg) IRA bomb caused extensive damage in Clady, County Tyrone. The car had been hijacked across the border in County Donegal and the driver had been ordered to leave the car beside a British Army checkpoint.
- 7 May: the IRA carried out a grenade attack on Coalisland RUC station, County Tyrone. A restaurant next to the station was damaged.
- 12 May: three British Army bases in West Belfast were targeted in IRA grenade attacks.
- 15 May: a former UDR soldier (Herbert McConville) was shot dead by the IRA while driving his meat delivery vehicle at Kilmorey Street, Newry, County Down, when a motorcycle pulled up alongside and the pillion passenger opened fire, hitting McConville 15 times with low-velocity bullets.
- 17 May: a Protestant civilian (David Wilson) was shot dead at Donaghmore, near Dungannon, County Tyrone while driving his firm's van. More than 30 shots were fired through the windscreen. The IRA claimed the man was a member of the UDR Regiment but they did not claim responsibility for the killing. Later, a caller from the Catholic Reaction Force claimed the CRF were responsible for the killing. Wilson is listed as a civilian at CAIN.
- 20 May: the IRA kidnapped and killed a Catholic civilian (Colm McKevitt) in Killeen, County Armagh after abducted from his sister's home there. The IRA claimed he was a local criminal and had been "given a free hand by the RUC in exchange for information on republicans in the area". The RUC refused to comment on the allegations. The man had reportedly been ordered to leave South Armagh by the IRA in 1979 but later returned.
- 22 May: two RUC officers (David McBride and William Smyth) and a British soldier (Andrew French) were killed by an IRA remote-controlled bomb, hidden in a ditch, which detonated when a joint British Army/Royal Ulster Constabulary foot patrol passed by at Milltown Bridge, near Crossmaglen, County Armagh.
- 25 May: a civilian (Francis "Frank" Hegarty) was found shot dead on the side of Cavan Road, near Castlederg, County Tyrone, as an alleged informer.
- 28 May: a UDR soldier (Brian Brown) and his sniffer dog were killed and another soldier wounded in an IRA bomb attack in Newry Road, Kilkeel, County Down. The soldiers were searching for a bomb which the IRA had claimed they left in the area when the sniffer dog nudged an oil drum which contained a booby trapped mercury tilt switch device.
- 13 June: the IRA detonated a 400 lb (180 kg) bomb at prisoner officers' homes in Limavady, County Londonderry.
- 16 June: a civilian contractor (Terence McKeever) to the British Army was kidnapped by the IRA and found shot dead at Mullaghduff, near Cullyhanna, County Armagh. The man had reportedly been warned previously to cease working for the British Army. He was found with two bullet wounds to his head and one to his neck.
- 18 June: a 500 lb (230 kg) van bomb was detonated outside Cloughmills RUC station in County Antrim. The RUC base was badly damaged and near 50 other buildings in the area were damaged, but there were no injuries.
- 1 July: an off-duty UDR soldier (Robert Hill) was killed by a booby trap bomb attached to his car outside his home, Drumaness, near Ballynahinch, County Down.
- 8 July: a RUC officer (John McVitty) was shot dead by the IRA at his farm, Drumady, near Rosslea, County Fermanagh. At his funeral, the local Church of Ireland minister claimed Protestants in Fermanagh were under siege.
- 9 July: two British soldiers were killed and two others injured when the IRA detonated a large car-bomb as a British Army foot-patrol passed near Crossmaglen, County Armagh.
- 10 July: the oil-rig replenisher Villa landed 14 tonnes of weaponry and explosives smuggled by the IRA from Libya off the Clogga Strand, near Wicklow, by inflatable boats. The same ship repeated the operation in October, this time by landing an 80 tonnes cache which included one tonne of Semtex, reportedly ten SAM-7 missiles, more RPG-7s, AK-47s, and hundreds of thousands of rounds of ammunition.
- 12 July: the IRA kidnapped a member of the Territorial Army and imprisoned him in a house in the Ardoyne area of Belfast. He was freed in a rescue operation by the British Army after suffering a broken jaw and had been bound and blindfolded in preparation for being shot dead.
- 24 July: the IRA carried out a sniper attack in Derry.
- 25 July: an RUC reservist and an English tourist were injured in an IRA gun attack in Ballinamallard, County Fermanagh.
- 26 July: three RUC officers (Charles Allen, Karl Blackbourne, and Peter Kilpatrick) were killed when IRA volunteers opened fire on a stationary armoured patrol car from close range in Newry. The IRA unit fired six shots into the car through an open door. They then threw a grenade into the car although it did not explode as the pin had not been fully pulled out.
- 30 July: a civilian contractor to the British Army (John Kyle) was shot dead by the IRA in McCullagh's Bar, Greencastle, County Tyrone. The following day the IRA claimed they had a complete list of contractors working for the security forces in parts of Tyrone and Fermanagh and they would be killed unless they stopped work immediately. Building contractors withdrew from repair work on Enniskillen RUC training depot.
- 4 August: a British patrol in the Ballymurphy area of Belfast was attacked by an IRA unit using blast-bombs.
- 4 August: an off-duty UDR soldier (Denis Taggart) was shot dead by the IRA outside his home, Battenberg Street, Shankill, Belfast. A two-man IRA unit was seen running up the street towards the man firing. They continued firing as he lay on the ground wounded before making their getaway.
- 5 August: the IRA extended its threat against people working for British security forces to include telephone engineers, cleaners and also fuel, bread and milk suppliers.
- 11 August: an IRA unit from the East Tyrone Brigade destroyed an RUC base at the Birches near Portadown, County Armagh. Before the attack on the Birches took place, a diversionary bomb attack was staged at Pomeroy RUC base to draw security forces away. The unit drove a digger through the perimeter fence with a 200 lb bomb attached to the bucket. Some members of this unit would be killed the next year by the SAS during a similar attack on Loughgall RUC base. See: Attack on RUC Birches barracks
- 15 August: Patrick Murray was shot dead by the IRA on Clonard Street, Lower Falls, Belfast. The IRA claimed he was an informer, who had previously been a member of their organisation and had been paid by the RUC to work as an informer.
- 22 August: the IRA fired mortars at a RUC base in Carrickmore County Tyrone.
- 28 August: Mervyn Bell, a civilian contractor to the British Army, was shot dead by the IRA while sitting in stationary car outside his father's workplace, council depot, Strand Road, Derry. The IRA denied claims that the killing was sectarian, stating: "The man's religion is of no interest to us. Despite previous warnings he continued to work for the UDR, and that was the reason he was targeted."
- 2 September: Gardaí foiled an IRA mortar attack near the border. Special Branch Patrol from Dundalk discovered a van loaded with six large homemade mortars with holes cut in the roof.
- 10 September: The IRA shot dead a man (David McVeigh) in Lurgan. The IRA claimed he had been a member of their organisation but had become an informer in 1982 after he was arrested in connection with the bombing of Lurgan Golf Club.
- 11 September: the IRA launched a gun and rocket attack on RUC headquarters on the Strand Road in Derry.
- 12 September: an IRA bomb planted under a car fatally injured a man in Derry. The intended target was his father, a part-time member of the UDR.
- 14 September: a high-ranking UVF member (John Bingham) was shot dead by the IRA at his home, Ballysillan, Belfast. Two IRA men, armed with a rifle and a revolver, used an axe to smash down his front door before shooting him in both legs. The UVF man managed to make his way to an upstairs bedroom before being shot three more times. The IRA later released a statement saying: "Relying on accurate intelligence reports we were able to pinpoint the whereabouts of UVF murder-gang leader John Bingham, who after a period of intensive activities which resulted in the deaths of five innocent Catholics, had just in the last number of weeks felt safe to return home."
- 14 September: a RUC foot-patrol came under fire from the IRA in West Belfast.
- 14 September: an IRA volunteer (James McKernan) was shot dead by the British Army in Brenda Park, Belfast. He had been fleeing a British Army patrol after planting a booby-trap bomb nearby.
- 6 October: an off-duty UDR soldier (Martin Blaney) was shot dead by the IRA outside his home, Eglish, near Dungannon, County Tyrone.
- 11 October: a RUC officer (Desmond Dobbin) was killed and another officer injured when the IRA mortar bombed New Barnsley British Army base, Springfield Road, West Belfast. The constable was killed when the mortar bomb exploded just above his head. Two civilians were slightly wounded in the attack. The other injured officer was later killed by the IRA in 1990.
- 24 October: a civilian contractor (Kenneth Johnston) to the British Army/RUC was shot dead by the IRA while sitting in his firm's stationary car, Magherafelt, County Londonderry. The IRA claimed the firm had ignored repeated warnings to stop working for the security forces.
- 26 October: an IRA unit fired a mortar at Crossmaglen British Army base in County Armagh.
- 28 October: an IRA unit fired seven mortars at Drummuckavall British Army watchtower in County Armagh. This is the first recorded use of Libyan-supplied Semtex high-explosive. In the aftermath, a red Ford Escort was pursued while escaping across the border towards Thomas "Slab" Murphy's farm by members of the Scots Guards. One of the guards, a Lance Corporal, broke into a shed, where he was confronted by two IRA members. The guard had inadvertently crossed the border. After a brief brawl with the two men, a Gardaí patrol arrived at the scene and rescued/arrested the soldier for being in possession of an illegal firearm. He was taken to a police station at Dundalk but was released six hours later after negotiations between senior RUC and Garda officers.
- 14 November: IRA attack on an RUC base in Newry; the bombs fell short of their target and landed on residential homes. 39 civilians were injured including a four year old Catholic girl. The IRA issued a statement afterwards which read.... "this incident left us open to justified criticism".
- 14 November: A massive IRA bomb containing 500lbs of explosives and 200lbs of metal pieces packed into a 40-gallon drum was left at the side of Corgary Road at Cadtledreg, Co. Tyrone with a command wire leading across the Irish border. The device was safely defused.
- 23 November: six British soldiers were wounded after the IRA launched seven mortars at a British Army barracks in Middletown, County Armagh.
- 27 November: the IRA launched a mortar at Newry RUC base; however, the device overshot its target, landing in a nearby residential area where it wounded more than 30 people (mainly from flying glass). The IRA apologised for the incident.
- 29 December: the IRA claimed responsibility for a bomb that wrecked a pub in St. Mary Street, Newry.
- 12 December: Desmond Caldwell killed at his workplace in Killen, near Castlederg, County Tyrone by a 5lb IRA bomb placed under a milk lorry tanker at Killen Creamery. The IRA knew that the company employed a number of part-time RUCR and UDR members, and overnight on the 11th/12th a bombing team cut the creamery's perimeter fence and planted the bomb beneath the cab of one of the tankers. The bomb detonated the following day at lunchtime when Caldwell turned the ignition key, he died en route to hospital. He was not a member of either the RUC or UDR, and the IRA apologised for his death.
- 16 December: a school bus was hijacked and a 600 lb (270 kg) bomb was loaded on board. The driver was forced to take it to a South Belfast RUC barracks where the bomb exploded twenty minutes later, slightly injuring seven people. The RUC base and an Evangelical Presbyterian church were damaged beyond repair. Several hundred houses and other buildings nearby were also damaged. The IRA claimed responsibility.
- 21 December: the IRA bombed several County Tyrone businesses: the Glenavon House Hotel, Cookstown, The Park, Dungannon and the Kildress Inn, Cookstown.
- 24 December: an IRA bomb from the East Tyrone Brigade was planted in a pub in Ballygawley, County Tyrone, called "Loughran's Bar". A 15-minute warning was given and the whole pub was destroyed. There was no deaths or serious injuries.

== 1987 ==
- 2 January: three mortars were fired from a lorry toward Crossmaglen British Army base. Forty minutes later, a timer launched another three mortars at the base.
- 9 January: An RUC foot patrol was walking through the High Street in the centre of Enniskillen, Co. Fermanagh, when a 10lbs explosive device planted inside a rubbish bin exploded outside Hanna's Toyshop. The device was triggered by an IRA member watching from the Crow's Nest Bar across the street. The patrol, which was a mixture of regular and reserve policemen, was engulfed by the blast and several were injured. 49 year old RUCR officer Ivan Crawford, a father of three, was killed by the explosion.
- 9 January: six mortars were fired from a tractor and trailer at a permanent joint RUC-British Army checkpoint along the main Dublin-Belfast road outside Newry.
- 25 January: the IRA shot and wounded a UDR soldier near Castlecaulfield, County Tyrone.
- 26 January: the IRA shot dead a senior UDR officer and full-time MOD employee (Major George Shaw) outside his home on Coalisland Road, Dungannon, Co. Tyrone. Two concealed IRA members walked over and shot him three times as he left home for work. Another UDR soldier opened fire on the fleeing gunmen as they escaped by hijacking a car.
- 30 January: the IRA detonated several bombs in the centres of Belfast and Lisburn causing extensive damage.
- 31 January: the British Army defused a car bomb left on Springfield Drive, Belfast.
- 31 January: Two armed and masked IRA men planted a bomb in Clancy's Tavern on Main Street in Belleek. The men carried the bomb in a hold-all into the bar and shouted a warning. The bomb exploded a short time later, there were no injuries but the building was badly damaged.
- 13 February: a British soldier was slightly injured in a bomb attack in the Bogside area of Derry. One hundred people were evacuated from the surrounding area after mortar equipment was found in a nearby apartment in a followup operation.
- 14 February: a bomb was left opposite Royal Victoria Hospital, Belfast.
- 21 February: an RUC officer was injured in a gun and rocket attack on the home of a senior judge on the Antrim Road, Belfast. A UDR Humber Pig tried to ram the escaping IRA vehicle and thirty shots were exchanged.
- 24 February: The IRA carried out a mortar attack against Newtownstewart RUC base, County Tyrone, badly damaging the building. A civilian (William Johnston) visiting his daughter nearby died of a heart attack.
- 5 March: a British soldier was wounded by an IRA bomb in Clonard Street, Belfast.
- 6 March: New Barnsley RUC/British Army base in Belfast came under IRA gun attack. Meanwhile, Fort Jericho British Army base, also in Belfast, was mortared by an IRA unit.
- 7 March: a RUC riot squad were shot at by an IRA sniper in the Whiterock area of Belfast.
- 10 March: a RUC officer (Peter Nesbitt) was killed when the IRA detonated a remote controlled bomb at the Ardoyne Shops on the Crumlin Road in Belfast. The RUC had been lured to the area by a hoax phone call claiming an armed robbery was in progress. The IRA had correctly anticipated which doorway the RUC would take cover in and detonated a small booby-trap bomb when they arrived. The IRA claimed his death was retaliation for "RUC brutality at republican funerals".
- 13 March: two bombs exploded at Smithfield Market, Belfast 10 prior to the opening of a revamped facility. Another device exploded behind a shop on the Dublin Road.
- 13 March: two RUC officers were injured in an IRA bomb attack during the funeral of RUC officer Peter Nesbitt at Roselawn Cemetery, Belfast.
- 13 March 1987: John Chambers, a Protestant civilian, was shot dead by the IRA while driving lorry, Killowen, near Rostrevor, County Down. An off-duty UDR member was the intended target.
- 15 March: an IRA bomb exploded at a border post outside Derry.
- 19 March: several mortars were fired from a tractor and trailer at a joint RUC-British Army base at Kinawley, County Fermanagh, causing extensive damage to the main building and slightly injuring a British soldier.
- 19 March: the IRA shot and wounded an off-duty UDR soldier in Cookstown, County Tyrone. He returned fire and escaped the ambush.
- 22 March: an IRA member was fatally wounded in Derry when a weapon he was carrying accidentally discharged.
- 23 March: Leslie Jarvis, a civilian employed at Magilligan Prison, was shot dead by the IRA as he sat in his car in a car park outside Magee College of Further Education, Rock Road, Derry. Three masked gunmen approached the front of the vehicle and fired six shots through the windscreen using a low-velocity rifle. Jarvis was shot in the head and died instantly. The IRA unit was then seen casually walking away.
- 23 March: two RUC officers (John Bennison and Austin Wilson) called to the scene of the murder of Leslie Jarvis, were killed when the IRA detonated a briefcase bomb which exploded, Rock Road, Derry.
- 23 March: 31 people were injured in a car bomb attack at Rheindahlen Military Complex, near Mönchengladbach in Germany.
- 28 March: the IRA detonated three bombs in Dungannon, County Tyrone. A shop and service station was extensively damaged.
- 30 March: a British soldier (Ian O'Connor) was killed in an IRA blast bomb in Divis Flats, West Belfast. The bombs were dropped from the flat complex onto the roof of a passing British Land Rover. One of the bombs fell through a hatch in the vehicle's roof and exploded, killing O'Connor and wounding another soldier. A Sinn Féin member was later charged for his part in the attack. Author Tony Geraghty claims the bombs were actually Mark-6 mortar shells dropped by hand.
- 30 March: the IRA launched a gun and grenade attack on New Barnsley RUC/British Army base in Belfast.
- 3 April: an off-duty UDR soldier (James Oldman, aged 39) was shot dead by the IRA outside his shop, Ederney, County Fermanagh.
- 3 April: an RUC officer (George Shaw) was shot dead by the IRA outside Ballynahinch RUC base, County Down. Two RUC officers were leaving the base when an IRA unit fired on them from the opposite side of the road, killing one officer and wounding another.
- 6 April: the IRA attacked several security forces bases in the Belfast.
- 7 April: two British soldiers were injured in the Beechmount area of Belfast.
- 11 April: two RUC officers (Frederick Armstrong and Robert McLean) were shot dead in an IRA ambush while on foot patrol, Main Street, Portrush, County Antrim.
- 12 April: the IRA shot dead Charles McIlmurray as an alleged informer. His body was found in a van abandoned at the rear of a petrol filling station, Killeen, County Armagh. His hands were tied behind his back and a plastic bag was placed over his face.
- 12 April: the IRA fired several mortars at an RUC base in County Fermanagh.
- 16 April: thirteen mortars were fired at Bessbrook British Army base in County Armagh, injuring two soldiers. According to the IRA report, seven mortar rounds landed inside the base.
- 20 April: a RUC inspector (David Ead) was killed when an IRA unit opened fire on an RUC foot patrol on Central Promenade, Newcastle, County Down.
- 21 April: Harold Henry was shot near his home, The Loup, near Moneymore, County Londonderry. A security contractor to the British Army, he was shot four times in the head by a five-man IRA unit.
- 23 April: An RUC officer (Thomas Cooke) was killed after being shot by the IRA while off-duty in Prehen, County Londonderry. He was leaving a local golf club when he was shot ten times at close range by a two-man IRA unit.
- 25 April: Chief Justice Maurice Gibson and his wife, Cecily, were assassinated when the IRA detonated a roadside bomb as their car passed in Killeen, County Armagh.
- 25 April: an off-duty UDR soldier (William Graham) was shot dead by the IRA at his family's farm, off Gortscraheen Road, near Pomeroy, County Tyrone.
- 28 April: Senior UVF member William "Frenchy" Marchant was shot dead by the IRA in a drive-by shooting on the Shankill Road, West Belfast. He was leaving the offices of the Progressive Unionist Party (PUP) when he was shot a number of times at close range with an Armalite rifle and a handgun. The IRA claimed Marchant had been involved in the killing of IRA volunteer Larry Marley; ITV alleged he was involved in the Dublin bombings of 1974 which killed more 20 civilians.
- 1 May: the IRA carried out a rocket attack on New Barnsley RUC station, Belfast.
- 1 May: a British soldier was injured in an IRA attack in the New Lodge area of Belfast.
- 2 May: an IRA volunteer (Finbarr McKenna) was killed in a premature bomb explosion during an attack on Springfield RUC base in Belfast. A woman nearby was injured.
- 5 May: the IRA bombed a restaurant in Derry.
- 6 May: workers were injured in an IRA attack on the court house in Dungannon, County Tyrone.
- 8 May: Loughgall Ambush: the SAS ambushed volunteers of the Provisional IRA East Tyrone Brigade as they attempted to attack an RUC station in Loughgall, County Armagh. All eight IRA volunteers, along with a civilian (Anthony Hughes) were killed.
- 21 May: an off-duty UDR soldier ( Captain Ivan Anderson) was shot dead by the IRA near his home in Tiroony, near Carrickmore, County Tyrone. He was driving from Sixmilecross Primary School where he was head teacher when his car was hit a number of times by IRA gunfire. He managed to continue driving for several yards before crashing. The officer was chairman of the local branch of the Ulster Unionist Party (UUP).
- 22 May: Charles Watson, Ulster Volunteer Force (UVF) member, was shot dead at his home, Downpatrick Road, Clough, County Down.
- 29 May: an off-duty UDR soldier was shot and injured in Strabane, County Tyrone.
- 29 May: an off-duty UDR soldier was shot and injured but returned fire in a pub in County Tyrone. He had already been attacked in January in Castlecaulfield.
- 2 June: an off-duty RUC officer (Samuel McClean) was shot dead at his parents' farm, Callan, Drumkeen, near Raphoe, County Donegal, by two IRA men using a shotgun and a revolver.
- 4 June: a British soldier (Joseph Leach), standing in the back of a Land Rover, while on mobile patrol, Shaw's Road, Andersonstown, Belfast, was shot dead by an IRA sniper.
- 11 June: a British soldier was shot and injured by an IRA sniper in the New Barnsley area of Belfast.
- 12 June: an off-duty UDR soldier (Joseph McIlwaine) was shot dead by three IRA men, who shot him 12 times at close range with handguns at his workplace, Aberdelgy Golf Club, Lambeg, near Lisburn, County Antrim.
- 15 June: ex-UDR soldier (Nathaniel Cush) was killed by a booby trap bomb attached to his car outside his workplace, Tomb Street, off Corporation Street, Belfast.
- 16 June: two RUC officers were injured in a bomb attack in the Creggan, Derry.
- 23 June: an RUC officer (Robert Guthrie) was shot dead by the IRA while driving his car into the rear entrance of Antrim Road Royal Ulster Constabulary (RUC) base, Belfast.
- 23 June: an off-duty UDR soldier and his mother were both wounded after being shot outside a social event at St Vincent De Paul parochial hall in Ligoniel, Belfast.
- 24 June: a member of the Workers' Party (Thomas Wilson) was kidnapped and found shot dead by the IRA off Rodney Parade, Falls, West Belfast. The IRA claimed the man was an informer and ruled out any feud between themselves and the OIRA, the military wing of the Workers Party.
- 26 June: an off-duty UDR soldier (John Tracey) was shot dead by the IRA on Surrey Street in Belfast. He was shot five times in the head at close range.
- 2 July: a bomb exploded while security forces were clearing area following a bomb alert at a bank in Derry.. Six people including two children and two British soldiers were injured.
- 7 July: a UDA/UFF member (William Reynolds) was shot dead in a pool hall, Ligoniel Road, North Belfast, by a two-man IRA unit which opened fire on him with a submachine-gun and a revolver, hitting him nine times.
- 12 July: a former member of the Royal Air Force (Alan McQuiston) was shot dead by the IRA on Alliance Avenue, Ardoyne, North Belfast. The IRA claimed it had intervened "to end an hour-long attack by loyalists on the area". Locals claimed the man had been attempting to stop youths from throwing stones and bottles into the nearby Catholic area. A 16-year-old was also wounded in the shooting.
- 17 July: an IRA unit launched a drogue bomb (improvised anti-armour grenade) at a British Army Land Rover on the Falls Road. This is the first recorded use of such a weapon by the IRA.
- 19 July: a British soldier was shot dead by an IRA sniper while on foot patrol in Belleek, County Fermanagh. He was providing cover to other members of his unit when he was shot in the head with a single bullet. The RUC claimed the IRA sniper had fired from the southern side of the border, the Gardaí denied this.
- 22 July: two hotels were damaged in separate car bomb attacks in Derry. The IRA claimed the hotels were frequented by members of the security forces.
- 23 July: an off-duty UDR soldier was shot dead by the IRA in the Twinbrook area of Belfast. He was driving along the Stewardstown road when he was shot through the windscreen with seven 7.62mm rounds.
- 27 July: a RUC officer was shot dead by the IRA in his home in Ballymena, County Antrim. The IRA unit used a sledgehammer to break down his door before shooting him ten times with a submachine-gun and a pistol.
- 31 July: two bombs exploded in Belfast, one at a restaurant at Shaw's Bridge the other at the Landsdowne Court Hotel on the Antrim Road. Three men were arrested in Smithfield in possession of explosives.
- 9 August: five RUC officers were injured when their land-rover was hit by an IRA impact-grenade on Dawson Street, Belfast.
- 9 August: an IRA unit threw a blast bomb at an RUC patrol in Derry.
- 10 August: three RUC officers were injured when their mobile patrol was attacked by an IRA unit using impact-grenades on the Ballymurphy Road in Belfast.
- 11 August: the IRA bombed several industrial units on the outskirts of Belfast.
- 16 August: the IRA sent letterbombs to six senior civil servants in London; there were no fatalities.
- 20 August: an IRA bomb completely destroyed a garage in Killean, County Armagh, close to the main border crossing which was closed to traffic due to the

damage caused by the bomb.

- 24 August: an off-duty UDR soldier survived an IRA assassination attempt in West Belfast.
- 26 August: two undercover RUC Special Branch officers were shot dead by the IRA after entering the Liverpool Bar on Donegall Quay, Belfast.
- 30 August: a RUC officer was shot dead by the IRA outside his home in Ballyronan, County Londonderry.
- 3 September: the IRA launched a mortar attack on a British Army base in Whiterock, Belfast.
- 9 September: the IRA shot dead a civilian in North Belfast. The IRA mistook him for an off-duty member of the British Army's UDR Regiment.
- 11 September: a British soldier was seriously injured in a gun attack by an IRA unit on the Springfield Road, Belfast.
- 13 September: security forces sealed off Cookstown Road, Belfast after the IRA warned of 800 lb (360 kg) bomb.
- 17 September: an IRA unit carried out a gun and grenade attack on a RUC patrol in West Belfast.
- 17 September: an off-duty UDR soldier was shot dead by the IRA in the Tigers Bay area of Belfast.
- 20 September: the IRA mortared Springfield Parade RUC Barracks in Belfast.
- 24 September: an off-duty UDR soldier was shot and injured but managed to return fire outside his office in Cookstown, County Tyrone. In the followup operation by security forces two men, one of them wounded, were arrested.
- 24 September: the IRA shot dead a civilian as he drove his car along Kilmorey Street in Newry. The IRA stated that the man was mistaken for an RUC officer and it extended "sincere sympathy" to his family.
- 1 October: a RUC officer was injured in an IRA grenade assault in Pomeroy, County Tyrone.
- 3 October: IRA volunteers from the South Armagh Brigade launched ten mortars at Glassdrummond (Glasdrumman) British Army base. The base was badly damaged but there were no injuries.
- 4 October: the IRA detonated a car bomb outside a commercial centre in North Belfast causing extensive damage.
- 14 October: the IRA fired two rockets at separate RUC bases in Belfast in coordinated attacks in the mid-morning. There were no injuries.
- 18 October: a 3,000 lb (1,400 kg) bomb packed inside slurry spreader was found at a disused barn near Omagh, County Tyrone.
- 21 October: several IRA volunteers in Turf Lodge carried out a punishment shooting against 16‑year-old Francis Finnegan, who they claimed was a joy rider.
- 24 October: the IRA detonated a bomb at a courthouse in Belfast.
- 26 October: a British soldier was injured in an attack on the Springfield Road, West Belfast, when his Saracen armoured vehicle was hit by a drogue-bomb in an IRA attack.
- 27 October: a British soldier was injured when an IRA unit detonated an anti-personnel device close to Mackies Factory in West Belfast.
- 28 October: two IRA volunteers (Eddie McSheffrey and Paddy Derry) were killed when bombs they were transporting exploded prematurely in the Creggan area of Derry.
- 29 October: A British soldier was injured when an IRA unit attacked North Howard Street barracks in Belfast with a grenade launcher.
- 31 October: three RUC officers were injured (one seriously) in an IRA ambush in Strabane, County Tyrone.
- 1 November: in transit to Ireland, the last arms consignment from Libya was intercepted by the French Navy aboard the MV Eksund, along with five crew members, among them bomb-maker Gabriel Cleary. The vessel was found to contain 120 tonnes of weapons, including HMGs, 36 RPGs, 1000 detonators, 20 SAMs, Semtex and 1,000,000 rounds of ammunition.
- 2 November: four RUC officer were injured when the IRA unit launched a grenade at their Land Rover in North Queen Street, North Belfast.
- 8 November: the Remembrance Day bombing at Enniskillen killed 11 civilians and one RUC officer, and injured 63 people. Another bomb had been planted at Tullyhommon Post Office, near Pettigoe, County Fermanagh. A Remembrance Sunday parade (which included many members of the Boys' and Girls' Brigades) had unwittingly gathered near the Tullyhommon bomb. British soldiers and RUC officers had also been there, and the IRA said it triggered the bomb when soldiers were standing beside it. It was defused by security forces and was found to have a command wire leading to a "firing point" across the border. The Tullyhommon bomb had the potential for greater casualties than those at Enniskillen.
- 21 November: the IRA placed three bombs in the Kildress Inn, Cookstown, County Tyrone. The bombs exploded at approximately 7.30 pm destroying the building. A warning was given and there were no injuries.
- 23 November: an IRA unit launched a grenade attack on the security forces in the New Barnsley area of Belfast.
- 25 November: Belfast was paralyzed by a series of hoax bomb alerts. A small bomb was detonated near Donegall Pass. There were no injuries.
- 27 November: the Belfast to Dublin railway was severed when the IRA detonated a 10 lb (4.5 kg)bomb at Finaghy Halt.
- 28 November: two British soldiers were wounded when the IRA launched three mortars at a temporary vehicle check point in south County Armagh.
- 10 December: two British soldiers were badly injured when an IRA unit launched a grenade at a mobile patrol in Bank Place, Derry.
- 16 December: the IRA killed a Catholic civilian (Gerald Doherty) in Tullyally, Derry when one of three devices exploded outside his home. Other residents were injured. The IRA mistakenly believed that members of the security forces lived in the homes. The IRA did not claim responsibility.
- 17 December: the IRA detonated a 200 lb (91 kg) car-bomb outside the home of Judge Donald Murray in Cadogan Park, South Belfast. A warning was given and there were no injuries.
- 21 December: two British soldiers were injured in a gun battle with the IRA in the Bogside area of Derry City. The incident occurred just minutes after the IRA had carried out a punishment shooting on a local youth.
- 22 December: UDA/UFF leader John McMichael was killed when he triggered a 5 lb (2.3 kg) booby trap bomb which had been attached to his car outside his home in Lisburn by an IRA unit.

== 1988 ==
- 4 January: a British soldier was shot and injured by an IRA sniper during an attack on Woodbourne RUC/British Army barracks in Belfast.
- 9 January: the IRA detonated a 500 lb (230 kg) car-bomb outside Belfast Law Courts on Chichester Street. A warning was given and there were no injuries.
- 15 January: a UDR soldier was shot and fatally wounded by the IRA in Coalisland, County Tyrone. Three IRA volunteers had cut holes in a hedge outside his home to make firing positions and as he drove past his car was hit by over 20 rounds fired from two AK-47 assault rifles. He died a day later.
- 23 January: a RUC officer was injured after an RUC patrol came under gun and grenade assault on the Culmore Road.
- 25 January: a RUC officer was killed and others were badly injured after an IRA unit launched two drogue bombs at their armoured patrol in Mulholland Terrace in West Belfast. The RUC said this was the first time an officer had been killed by a "drogue bomb/impact grenade". A British Army bomb disposal officer described the devices as "devastating".
- 26 January: The IRA detonated a 500 lb (230 kg) car-bomb at Dunmurry RUC barracks. The bomb caused extensive damage to the building. Three RUC officers and six civilians were injured in the blast.
- 30 January: an alleged rapist was shot and injured by the IRA in a punishment attack in the Twinbrook area of Belfast.
- 4 February: an IRA active service unit in Derry engaged a joint British army and RUC checkpoint on the Foyle Bridge. Over 70 rounds were fired before the unit withdrew.
- 10 February: an IRA grenade attack on a British army observation post on North Howard Street in West Belfast injured two British soldiers.
- 15 February: a UDR soldier was shot dead by a unit of the IRA's South Down Command at his home in Kilkeel, County Down.
- 19 February: two RUC officers were injured (one seriously) when an IRA active service unit launched a grenade at an RUC armoured car on Main Street in Coalisland.
- 24 February: two UDR soldiers were killed and two injured when an active service unit from the IRA's Belfast Brigade detonated a 250 lb (110 kg) bomb at the Royal Avenue security gate in Belfast. One land rover was ripped apart by the explosion. A second device, intended for the Army response unit, was defused. Both of the dead soldiers were also members of the Orange Order.
- 26 February: an IRA unit launched two mortars at North Howard Street British army base. The mortars exploded in mid-air.
- 28 February: two members of the RUC were injured when the IRA launched two grenades at an RUC patrol in Strabane.
- 29 February: a British soldier and an RUC officer were injured when they triggered an anti-personnel mine which had been planted by the IRA in Andersonstown, Belfast.
- 29 February: two IRA volunteers, Brendan Burns and Brendan Moley of the IRA's South Armagh Brigade died when bombs they were transporting exploded prematurely during a raid on a British army base.
- 3 March: two IRA units attacked Musgrave Street RUC barracks with rocket-propelled grenades and assault rifles. The base was damaged but there were no injuries.
- 6 March: Operation Flavius: Three IRA volunteers, Daniel McCann, Sean Savage and Mairead Farrell, were killed by the SAS in Gibraltar, as they were planning an attack on a public military parade. Although initial reports claimed the three had been shot dead when about to set off a massive car bomb, within 24 hours the Foreign Secretary, Geoffrey Howe, was forced to admit this was not the case. However, a car used by the three was found in Marbella two days after the killings containing 140 lb (64 kg) of Semtex, timed to go off during the changing of the guard.
- 8 March: a British patrol came under heavy fire from an IRA unit at the Poleglass Roundabout in West Belfast.
- 14 March: an IRA volunteer was killed in a gun battle with British forces in Turf Lodge, West Belfast.
- 16 March: Milltown Cemetery attack: At the funeral of the three IRA volunteers killed in Gibraltar, Michael Stone, a member of the Ulster Freedom Fighters (UFF), launched hand grenades during the graveside oration, killing an IRA volunteer (Caoimhin MacBradaigh) and two civilians and injuring over 50 injured; including a 10‑year-old boy who was shot in the back, a 72‑year-old grandmother and a pregnant mother of four who was wounded by shrapnel. MacBradaigh had attempted to disarm Stone.
- 18 March: a Protestant civilian (Gillian Johnston) was shot dead and her fiancé seriously wounded by the IRA while sitting in a car in Tonaghgorm, near Belleek. Over 30 shots were fired into the vehicle. The IRA said the intended target was her brother, who they wrongly claimed was a member of the UDR before subsequently admitting he was not. The IRA later announced that it had disbanded the unit which had carried out the attack.
- 19 March: an IRA unit carried out a blast bomb attack on a British Army patrol in Belfast.
- 19 March: Corporals killings: During the funeral of IRA volunteer Caoimhin MacBradaigh, killed in the cemetery attack by Michael Stone, a car approached the funeral procession at high speed. The car was surrounded by mourners, and two men later identified as corporals in the British Army were overpowered, dragged from the car, stripped and searched, taken to waste ground and shot and stabbed to death by the IRA.
- 19 March: an IRA mortar attack against an RUC station in Belfast was foiled by the security forces.
- 21 March: a RUC officer was killed in an IRA gun attack on a vehicle checkpoint in the Creggan area of Derry. He was shot in the head after an IRA unit fired two bursts of gunfire from a nearby building which they had taken over sometime earlier. A nearby civilian was hit in the leg by a stray bullet.
- 6 April: an UDR soldier was killed when he detonated a booby trap bomb which had been attached to his car by an IRA active service unit in Fermanagh.
- 7 April: a UDR Major and an RUC officer were injured by gunfire during a large IRA operation in Clogher, County Tyrone. IRA units took control of the town before launching simultaneous assaults on RUC and UDR barracks.
- 13 April: Two RUC constables were shot and wounded by the IRA in an ambush at Armagh city.
- 18 April: a civilian who worked as a laborer for the British army was injured when he triggered a booby trap bomb which had been attached to his car by an IRA unit in Ballyronan, County Londonderry.
- 18 April: two British soldiers were injured when an IRA unit detonated a 5 lb (2.3 kg) mine by remote control as a patrol passed in Dungannon. Limited engagement followed, no reports of further injuries on either side.
- 21 April: A worker repairing the roof of Belfast High Court was shot and wounded by the IRA.
- 26 April: a UDR soldier was killed in a gun attack near Moortown, County Tyrone. He was shot at close range by IRA volunteers using assault rifles. After he fell to the ground they fired more shots into him. Another British soldier was killed and two injured when the IRA detonated a remote control bomb in Carrickmore. The British patrol had passed a small shop in the village when the bomb exploded. It is believed the IRA switched a gas cylinder which always sat outside the shop for one packed with40 lb (18 kg) explosives.
- 1 May: three British soldiers, all members of the Royal Air Force, were killed and four others were wounded when the IRA launched separate attacks in the Netherlands. In the first attack an IRA unit opened fire on a car carrying British soldiers near Roermond, killing one and injuring three. In the second attack, two British soldiers were killed when they triggered a booby trap bomb attached to their car in Nieuw-Bergen.
- 6 May: an IRA volunteer (Hugh Hehir) was killed by the Garda Special Branch following a bank raid in County Clare.
- 11 May: Craigavon RUC barracks came under grenade and gun assault from the IRA shortly after 9:20am. The base was damaged but there were no injuries.
- 12 May: a British soldier, of the Royal Pioneer Corps dog unit, and his Labrador dog were killed when they triggered an IRA anti-personnel device on the Castleblaney Road. The IRA had partly hidden a massive landmine at the side of the road so that it would be discovered by the British Army. When the bomb disposal team arrived they defused the device and a follow-up search was carried out. The IRA had placed a pressure plate bomb nearby and it exploded when the soldier stepped on it during the follow-up operation.
- 13 May: two British soldiers were badly wounded when the IRA detonated an anti-personnel mine as their patrol passed on North Howard Street, Belfast.
- 16 May: a UDR soldier was badly injured when a booby trap bomb concealed in a creamery can exploded at Bantry, County Tyrone.
- 19 May: seven RUC officers were injured in an IRA bomb attack during the Balmoral Show in Belfast.
- 24 May: an IRA unit fired four mortars at Cookstown British army base. Three of the mortars landed inside the base but only one exploded.
- 15 June: a high-ranking UVF member (Robert "Squeak" Seymour) was shot dead by the IRA in an alley behind his shop on Woodstock Road in Belfast.
- 15 June: six off-duty British soldiers were killed by an IRA booby-trap bomb attached to their unmarked military van in Market Square, Lisburn. The bomb was made in such a way so as to ensure it exploded only upwards, causing maximum damage to the van, but avoiding spraying surrounding vehicles and incurring collateral damage due to shrapnel.
- 22 June: the IRA shot a man in Derry who they claimed was a member of the UDR, this was denied by the RUC.
- 22 June: a British soldier was wounded in an IRA gun and bomb attack in the Westrock area of Belfast.
- 23 June: a British Army Lynx helicopter was brought down by the IRA near Upper Cashel Lough Upper, South Armagh. The aircraft was engaged by two DShKs machine guns, three M60s and rifles fired from Aughanduff Mountain. There were no reported casualties.
- 4 July: the IRA attacked North Queen Street RUC Station in Belfast but withdrew after being engaged by a heavily armed SAS detachment. The SAS shot dead a passing taxi driver.
- 7 July: two civilians were killed in an IRA bomb attack at the Falls Baths in West Belfast. The IRA released a statement saying that the operation had gone "tragically wrong". The IRA said the bomb was intended for a British foot patrol but had been triggered accidentally. In the follow-up operation a British Army bomb disposal officer was killed when he stepped on a pressure-plate bomb left nearby.
- 7 July: an IRA volunteer was killed when an improvised mortar detonated accidentally during an attack on Pomeroy RUC station.
- 13 July: nine British soldiers were injured when the IRA detonated two bombs at a British military barracks in Duisburg, Germany.
- 23 July: three civilians were killed by an IRA landmine on the main Belfast to Dublin road near Newry. The bomb was intended for High Court Judge Eoin Higgins, who was returning from Dublin Airport. The civilian vehicle was a similar model and had also been returning from Dublin Airport. Along the route it was driving behind an unmarked Garda car. The IRA believed this was a Garda escort and, judging by the car model and the route taken, it was assumed to the Higgins's car.
- 25 July: an IRA volunteer was shot by UVF members wearing RUC uniforms in the Markets area of Belfast.
- 29 July: a British soldier was killed when an IRA landmine exploded as a British foot patrol passed in Cullyhanna. Two RUC officers and two soldiers were also injured.
- 1 August: the first Provisional IRA bomb on the UK mainland in four years was set off by a timer device at the Postal & Courier Depot Royal Engineers (BFPO London) in Inglis Barracks, Mill Hill, North London. The two storey building containing the single men's quarters was completely destroyed. One soldier, Lance Corporal Michael Robbins, was killed. Nine others were injured.
- 2 August: a RUC detective was killed in an IRA under-car booby-trap bomb attack in Sloan Street, Lisburn.
- 2 August: a UDR soldier was shot dead in the carpark of a shopping centre in West Belfast by a two-man IRA unit. the gun used in the killing had been stolen from one of the corporals killed on 19 March.
- 2 August: six part-time soldiers of the UDR were injured when their vehicle was struck by an IRA explosive device outside Dungannon, County Tyrone.
- 3 August: a UDR soldier was killed on his way to work by an IRA unit which had taken over a house in Cookstown, County Tyrone.
- 4 August: two contractors who worked for the RUC were killed when the IRA ambushed their van as it left Belleek barracks. The van was hit by over 100 high velocity bullets.
- 6 August: Three Royal Engineers & a civilian were injured in a blast when the IRA bombed a British Army's Roy Barracks in Düsseldorf, Germany.
- 8 August: a British soldier died three weeks after being shot by an IRA sniper at New Barnsley base in west Belfast.
- 12 August: a British Army Sergeant-Major was shot dead by the IRA in Ostend, Belgium.
- 19 August: three RUC officers were injured in an IRA bomb attack in Lisnaskea, County Fermanagh. They had been lured to a ringing alarm at a petrol station. The Mourne Country Hotel in Newry was also damaged in an explosion.
- 20 August: Ballygawley bus bombing: eight British soldiers were killed and 28 wounded in a landmine attack on their bus, which was travelling between Omagh and Ballygawley. The bomb contained 200 pounds of plastic explosive.
- 22 August: a British Royal Navy officer was killed in an IRA bomb attack in Belfast.
- 24 August: a van bomb detonated adjacent to a house outside Maghera, County Londonderry. Two RUC officers in a passing convoy were injured.
- 24 August: a car bomb was detonated in the centre of Belfast causing an estimated 3 million pounds worth of damage.
- 27 August: the IRA carried out at least forty gun and bomb attacks across Northern Ireland, within a 24‑hour period, in a demonstration of the IRA's military capacity. The attacks occurred amid widespread unrest in nationalist areas in reaction to the extradition of IRA volunteer Robert Russell to Northern Ireland from the Republic:
  - a bomb in a hijacked Royal Mail van exploded outside Belfast City Hall.
  - a van bomb exploded outside Springfield Road RUC Station, Belfast.
  - two bursts of gunfire and two grenades were directed at a joint British Army/RUC checkpoint at Broadway in West Belfast.
  - a grenade was thrown at a British Army patrol in the St. James area of West Belfast. A second grenade was thrown at another patrol nearby and the IRA claimed they injured a soldier.
  - a van bomb was detonated beside a British Army Saracen APC in Donegall Road, West Belfast. The IRA claimed it "caused some injuries".
  - a 20 lb (9.1 kg) landmine was detonated near British soldiers on the Glen Road, West Belfast. The IRA claimed to have injured two soldiers.
  - IRA members opened fire on British soldiers in the Lenadoon area of West Belfast.
  - an IRA sniper fired two shots at a British Army foot patrol in the Beechmount area of West Belfast.
  - eight shots were fired at a British Army patrol in Cavendnish Street, off the Falls Road in West Belfast.
  - twenty-five shots were fired at the British Army observation post on Broadway Tower, West Belfast.
  - a grenade was thrown at a British Army patrol on the Springfield Road, West Belfast.
  - twenty shots were fired at Grosvenor Road RUC Barracks on the edge of Belfast city centre.
  - in four separate attacks, IRA snipers fired single shots at security forces patrols and roadblocks in the adjacent Westrock, Whiterock, Ballymurphy and Springhill areas of West Belfast.
  - IRA members using a belt-fed machine gun fired upwards of one hundred rounds at New Barnsley RUC base, West Belfast.
  - ten shots were fired at the British Army post at the top of Templar House flats in the New Lodge, North Belfast.
  - shortly after midnight, twenty shots were fired at a British army sangar at the Antrim Road/New Lodge Road junction in North Belfast.
  - a two-year old child was grazed by a bullet in an IRA attack on a joint British Army-RUC patrol in Broadway, West Belfast. The IRA denied responsibility, accusing the British Army of "firing indiscriminately" in the area previously and alleging soldiers "immediately opened fire without identifying a specific target" following an earlier IRA grenade attack.
  - a bomb exploded outside a bank on Spencer Road, Derry. One RUC officer was injured. Half an hour later a van bomb exploded on the new Foyle Bridge. There were hoax bombs and hijackings in Derry throughout August 27.
- 30 August: three IRA volunteers (Brian Mullin, and brothers Gerard and Martin Harte) were killed by the SAS near Drumnakilly, County Tyrone, as they attempted to kill an off-duty member of the Ulster Defence Regiment.
- 31 August: 'Good Samaritan bomb': two civilians were killed when an IRA booby trap bomb intended for the security forces exploded in a flat in Creggan, Derry. Another man later died from his injuries.
- 3 September: Crossmaglen British Army base in County Armagh was hit by three mortars.
- 9 September: an Ulster Clubs member was shot dead by the IRA in the Finaghy area of Belfast.
- 12 September the IRA detonated a car bomb at Donegal Square, Belfast. At least six people were injured.
- 12 September: the house of Sir Kenneth Bloomfield, the top civilian servant in Northern Ireland, located at Helen's Bay, County Down, was heavily damaged by two bombs planted by the IRA. Bloomfield, his wife and children were treated for shock.
- 15 September 1991: a British soldier lost sight in one eye after an IRA bomb was detonated by command wire as British security forces set up a vehicle checkpoint near Royal Victoria Hospital, Belfast.
- 17 September: an IRA north Belfast active service unit fired a machine gun at Girdwood barracks on the Antrim Road, hitting a UDR soldier several times but ultimately the soldier lived despite being hitting in the neck and back off the head.
- 17 September: shots were fired at a British army post from the St. James Road area of West Belfast.
- 24 September: IRA mortars primed to fire at Newtownbutler's RUC station were found lead to the village being evacuated. They were destroyed in a controlled explosion by the British Army, damaging the RUC base and civilian property.
- 25 September: an off-duty UDR soldier was shot dead by the IRA at Loughgall street, near Armagh city. The IRA unit fired 47 shots in the attack and the soldier was hit a number of times in the lower body.
- 4 October: a Prison Officer was killed when his car was blown up by an IRA bomb in the Bloomfield area of Belfast.
- 4 October: an IRA car bomb badly damaged the former Midland Hotel in York Road, Belfast.
- 7 October: a British soldier was wounded in an IRA booby-trap bomb attack in Belfast.
- 11 October: a RUC officer was shot dead by the IRA on the Lisburn Road in Belfast. He was looking after his brother's ice cream shop when two men entered and shot him a number of times at close range with .357 Magnums.
- 17 October: a contractor to the British Army was killed in an IRA bomb attack, Dundonald, Belfast.
- 26 October: a RUC officer was shot dead by an IRA sniper in Kinawley, County Fermanagh.
- 26 October: a civilian was killed by a booby-trap bomb attached to his car at his workplace (a postal sorting office) on Tomb Street, Belfast. The IRA claimed responsibility and said it believed he was a member of the UDR.
- 27 October: the RUC recovered a military-model flamethrower hidden in the grounds of an old people's home in Belfast. It was part of the consignment of Libyan arms imported by the IRA.
- 29 October: an IRA unit fired four rockets at the RUC station in Roslea, County Fermanagh. No RUC officers were injured but a woman died of a heart attack as she was being evacuated from her home nearby.
- 10 November: the IRA detonated a car bomb in a Campsie, County Londonderry estate which housed the families of British soldiers. Afterwards the IRA warned that such attacks would continue and British military personnel should move their families out of Northern Ireland.
- 11 November: the IRA claimed it wounded a soldier in Derry but according to the RUC the soldier was accidentally shot by a member of an army foot patrol.
- 20 November: the IRA bombed British Army barracks at North Howard Street, Belfast. Twenty-one houses were damaged and nine Soldiers were injured.
- 21 November: an RUC officer was killed in an IRA attack on a security barrier in Castlederg, County Tyrone.
- 23 November: an IRA bomb detonated outside the RUC base at Benburb, County Tyrone killed a Catholic civilian and his granddaughter.
- 1 December: two people were slightly injured after the IRA detonated a bomb near an army observation post in the centre of Derry.
- 3 December: the IRA launched a mortar attack on a UDR base at Clogher, County Tyrone. Wet conditions forced the IRA unit to fire short of their intended position and all the mortars missed the base.
- 12 December: the IRA carried out a mortar attack on a builder's yard in Magherafelt, County Londonderry.
- 13 December: the British Army defused a 300 lb (140 kg) bomb in Upper Queen Street, Belfast.
- 13 December: the IRA detonated a 200 lb (91 kg) bomb at Fort George British Army base in Derry.
- 13 December: a contractor to the British Army was shot dead by the IRA in Portadown, County Armagh.
- 14 December: a rocket was fired at an RUC Land Rover at a court-house in Newry. Two RUC officers and a civilian were hurt. The IRA claimed responsibility.
- 16 December: a UDR soldier was shot dead by the IRA in Downpatrick, County Down.
- 19 December: a 200 lb (91 kg) car bomb planted in a predominantly Protestant housing estate was defused at Artigavan, near Strabane, County Tyrone.
- 21 December: police in London uncovered a large IRA bomb factory after an IRA member shot an attempted car thief.
- 31 December: the IRA carried out a mortar attack on the British Army base at Cookstown, County Tyrone, at 10 minutes to midnight, hoping to catch the soldiers stationed there off-guard during New Year's Eve celebrations.

== 1989 ==
- 4 January: two RUC officers were injured in an IRA booby-trap bomb attack in the New Barnsley area of Belfast.
- 14 January: a British soldier was slightly injured when a bomb was detonated on the Andersontown Road, Belfast.
- 14 January: a British soldier was injured when a bomb was detonated in Derry.
- 14 January: an RUC patrol foiled an IRA bomb attack on an unmanned RUC station in Crumlin, County Antrim.
- 15 January: a former RUC officer was shot dead by the IRA while parked outside his girlfriend's house in Ballintra, County Donegal. Two IRA volunteers fired into the car through the front windscreen, shooting him 23 times. Shortly after the killing the IRA announced that it had stood down one of its units which operated along the Fermanagh-Donegal border.
- 22 January: a bomb containing 5 lb (2.3 kg) of Semtex and 30 lb (14 kg) of shrapnel was defused by the British Army near Pomeroy, County Tyrone.
- 24 January: the IRA launched a mortar attack on a RUC checkpoint at Kinawley, County Fermanagh.
- 24 January: sixty families were evacuated from their homes as a Semtex bomb was defused by the British army in Cookstown, County Tyrone.
- 25 January: an IRA van bomb detonated outside the city courthouse at Bishop Street causing extensive damage in Derry.
- 28 January: a RUC officer was killed when an IRA unit launched a drogue-bomb at a stationary patrol vehicle in Sion Mills, Tyrone. The device was thrown from the roof of a nearby pub as the car stopped on a routine inquiry. A second officer was badly injured in the attack. As reinforcements arrived a group of about two hundred people who had gathered attacked them with stones and bottles and a single plastic bullet was fired.
- 31 January: a British soldier was killed when an IRA unit detonated a remote control bomb which was hidden in a drainpipe as a British Army foot-patrol passed in the Falls area of Belfast.
- 6 February: an IRA volunteer (James Joseph Connolly) was killed when a bomb he was planting under an RUC officer's car exploded prematurely in Drumquin, near Omagh, County Tyrone.
- 10 February: a Catholic civilian was seriously injured when a bomb exploded under a car outside his home in South Belfast.
- 12 February: an IRA bomb left at a British Army base in Derry was defused.
- 12 February: Pickfords Removals was forced to quit operations in Northern Ireland because of IRA threats.
- 20 February: the IRA bombed the Clive Army barracks at Ternhill, Shropshire, England. One person was injured.
- 22 February: a British soldier was shot dead when a military bus came under gun attack from an IRA unit in the Waterside area of Derry. Lance Corporal Norman Duncan, aged 27, was shot as he drove from Ebrington Barracks in Derry to the nearby Ebrington Primary School to collect the children of British soldiers in a school bus. As the bus stopped at a junction a man jumped out of a nearby car, walked over to the bus and fired 15 shots at Duncan, hitting him six times in the head and abdomen.
- 26 February: a man was shot in the head by the IRA in an alley in the Lenadoon area of Belfast. The man was an estate agent and was accused of being an informer for providing the IRA with safe houses which were bugged by the security forces.
- 27 February: a former RUC officer was killed in an IRA booby trap bomb attack at his home in east Belfast. The IRA also accused the man of being involved with loyalist paramilitaries. The RUC denied this.
- 2 March: an IRA bomb damaged Craigmore Viaduct, exploding just four minutes before a passenger train from Dublin was due to leave nearby Newry Station. A clearance operation had to be mounted and the railway line was closed for six days. It was the eighth bomb on the Belfast-Dublin railway line in three months.
- 4 March: seven members of the security forces were injured in a car bomb explosion at Girdwood Barracks in north Belfast.
- 7 March: the IRA carried out a machine gun attack on a building in Coagh, which they claimed was used by loyalists to plan attacks. Three civilians were killed. The IRA claimed that one of the men killed (Leslie Dallas) was a UVF member but that the other two men had been "caught up in the confusion". The security forces and the UVF denied Dallas had been a UVF member.
- 8 March: two British soldiers were killed and six other badly wounded when their vehicle struck a massive IRA landmine on the Buncrana Road in Derry. The second vehicle in the patrol was completely destroyed.
- 12 March: a 5 lb (2.3 kg) Semtex bomb attached to the underside of the car of an off-duty member of the security forces was defused in County Londonderry.
- 13 March: an off-duty UDR soldier was shot and seriously injured by the IRA as he was walking his dog close to his home at Artigarvan, near Strabane, County Tyrone.
- 14 March: an off-duty UDR soldier was shot dead by the IRA while at his workplace in Dungannon, County Tyrone. It was the fourth attack against the UDR that week.
- 16 March: a senior UVF member was shot dead by the IRA while at his home in the Skegoneill area of Belfast. An IRA unit entered his home and shot him 15 times at close range.
- 20 March: two high-ranking RUC officers (Superintendent Bob Buchanan and Chief Superintendent Harry Breen) were ambushed and killed by the IRA near the Irish border outside Jonesborough, County Armagh. They were shot dead by a six-man unit using four rifles. There were at least 25 strike marks on their unmarked car.
- 29 March: a 500 lb (230 kg) car bomb left outside an office block in the centre of Belfast was defused.
- 2 April: four mortars were fired at Grosvenor RUC station, Belfast. Only one mortar partially exploded in a car park and there were no injuries.
- 3 April: British soldiers sealed off a section of the Falls Road, Belfast following an IRA claim that a bomb was left in derelict house.
- 4 April: IRA volunteer Gerard Casey was shot dead by the UDA/UFF in his Rasharkin home. He was a member of the North Armagh Brigade.
- 6 April: the IRA shot and wounded a former UDR soldier in North Belfast.
- 7 April: a large car bomb exploded in The Mall area of Armagh, County Armagh.
- 12 April: a civilian was killed when the IRA detonated a car-bomb at Warrenpoint RUC barracks. The IRA said one of its members had accidentally triggered a micro-switch device which caused the bomb to explode early. The bomb was meant to go off an hour later after a smoke bomb had detonated first to clear the area.
- 19 April: the IRA bombed the Dublin-Belfast railway line, near Lurgan, County Armagh. Cross-border rail services had only just resumed ten days after two other bomb alerts in south County Armagh.
- 19 April: an IRA unit launched an RPG-7 rocket at British Army vehicles on Lanark Way from the Springfield Road, Belfast. The rocket missed its target and penetrated a building half a mile away.
- 21 April: the IRA shot dead a civilian in his taxi on the Crumlin Road in Belfast. The IRA originally claimed he was a loyalist paramilitary. The attack was planned by Sandy Lynch, a British agent who had penetrated the IRA. He had tipped off the security forces of the attack and an SAS team were lying in wait for the IRA unit. The IRA escaped because they killed the man further up the road than expected. Lynch was later kidnapped by the IRA and was being interrogated in a house in Belfast when he was rescued by the RUC.
- 23 April: the IRA launched a mortar attack on an RUC base at Ballynafeigh on the Ormeau Road, Belfast. None of the projectiles hit their target and instead landed in a residential area surrounding the station. The IRA also exploded a 100 lb (45 kg) bomb targeting security forces clearing the area.
- 24 April: a 400 lb (180 kg) IRA van-bomb failed to explode in the Turf Lodge area of Belfast. Despite a warning from the IRA that there was a primed and unexploded bomb on a main road the RUC refused to close the street and only responded to the incident 13 hours later.
- 4 May: a prison officer was killed by an IRA booby-trap bomb attached to his car at Loughgall, County Armagh.
- 4 May: a British soldier was killed in an IRA landmine attack on a British army foot patrol just outside Crossmaglen, County Armagh. Three other soldiers were wounded. Seamus Mallon (SDLP MP) criticised both the IRA and the British Army for "turning south Armagh into one huge warzone".
- 7 May: four British soldiers were injured when a landmine exploded as their vehicle drove along a road near Camlough, County Armagh. Earlier that same day, five British soldiers were injured when a bomb exploded in a derelict building near Crossmaglen as their vehicle passed.
- 8 May: two UDR soldiers were injured when a roadside bomb exploded as their unmarked van was travelling between Omagh and Augher, County Tyrone. An IRA member was shot nearby by security forces while trying to steal a car. Another escaped.
- 10 May: a British soldier was badly injured losing both his legs and his right eye when the IRA carried out a remote-controlled bomb attack on his patrol on the Falls Road in Belfast.
- 13 May: the IRA launched a mortar attack against a British Army observation post in Glasdrumman, South Armagh. The attack involved the first use of the Mark-12 mortar.
- 15 May: the IRA launched a rocket attack against a joint British Army-RUC base in the Shantallow area of Derry.
- 16 May: two members of the security forces and several civilians were injured in a bomb attack against a joint British Army-RUC patrol in Forfar Street, Belfast. A three-year-old girl suffered a serious shrapnel wound and underwent emergency surgery.
- 2 June: the IRA carried out a gun and rocket attack against a British Army mobile patrol on Donegal Street, Belfast.
- 3 June: the IRA carried out a machine gun on a British Army observation post at Crievekeeran, south Armagh.
- 6 June: a large IRA bomb exploded at the under-construction Castlecourt Centre, Belfast. The RUC had been evacuating the area when it detonated and three women were hurt by flying glass.
- 14 June: a three-year child was injured after an IRA unit fired over 30 shots at British soldiers and RUC officers near the junction of Stewartstown Road and Shaws Road, Belfast.
- 15 June: an IRA bomb has injured seven members of the security forces and two civilians, one a pregnant woman, in West Belfast.
- 19 June: a bomb was left under the car of a building contractor who the IRA alleged worked for the security forces, in Glengormley, Belfast.
- 19 June: a bomb exploded at a British Army base in Osnabrück, Germany. There were no injuries but the explosion caused damage estimated at £75,000.
- 27 June: a RUC officer was killed in an IRA booby trap bomb attack in Strabane, Tyrone.
- 27 June: thirteen people were injured, four seriously by an incendiary bomb explosion in a paint shop the centre of Derry. The bombing occurred an hour after Northern Ireland Secretary Tom King had left the city following an announcement of new jobs for Derry.
- 1 July: an off-duty RUC officer was shot dead by the IRA at his parents' home in Garvagh, County Londonderry.
- 2 July: a British soldier was killed in an IRA booby trap bomb attack outside his home in Hanover, Germany. He was killed when an IRA bomb exploded as he opened the door of his Mercedes car.
- 3 July: a triple IRA bomb attack at Belfast Harbour Airport damaged two aircraft and a control tower.
- 5 July: IRA arson attacks on two County Londonderry quarries at Kilrea and Mascoquin, caused several million pounds worth of damage. The IRA claimed the companies were supplying materials to the security forces but this was denied.
- 7 July: three RUC officers were seriously injured in an IRA landmine attack on their patrol car between Waterfoot and Cushendall in Red Arch Bay, County Antrim. One of the officers died of his wounds 18 days later. An IRA statement claimed the attack "ruined the idea of normality" in the area.
- 15 July: the IRA detonated a 250 lb (110 kg) bomb outside the British Telecom telephone exchange in Belfast city centre. The IRA telephoned in a 20-minute warning to a local radio station. There were no civilian casualties.
- 18 July: the IRA kidnapped and killed a civilian near Dundalk. They claimed he was an informer who had aided the RUC in their arrest of Raymond McCreesh.
- 24 July: an IRA bomb attack injured three British soldiers on the Letterkenny Road, Derry.
- 26 July: the main Belfast-Dublin railway line was closed following an IRA bomb alert near Lurgan. It was at least the twentieth time the IRA had disrupted rail traffic on the route so far that year.
- 29 July: three people were injured after an IRA van bomb demolished a customs post near Newry, County Down.
- 31 July: the IRA detonated a 1,000 lb (450 kg) van bomb at Belfast courts.
- 5 August: a teenager was injured in an IRA mortar attack on Girdwood Barracks in north Belfast.
- 12 August: an IRA bomb wrecked a pub in Derry, just hours before the yearly Apprentice Boys parade.
- 16 August: a 100 lb (45 kg) IRA bomb destroyed a petrol station in Armagh, County Armagh. An IRA statement claimed the garage served the RUC on a daily basis and warned other petrol stations to stop serving the security forces.
- 23 August: British Army defusal experts carried out a controlled explosion on an IRA van bomb left outside an RUC station in Downpatrick, County Down.
- 29 August: a 1,500 lb (680 kg) bomb was discovered by Irish security forces in an advanced stage of preparation near Omeath, County Louth. Gardaí suspected it was to be used in attack at Newry RUC station across the border.
- 2 September: two British soldiers were shot and seriously wounded at a military housing area near Munster, West Germany, in a suspected IRA attack.
- 7 September: a German civilian (Heidi Hazell) was shot dead in West Germany in a stationary car with British licence plates outside the British Army married quarters in Unna. A gunman walked up to the car and shot her 14 times at point-blank range with an AK47. The IRA expressed regret for the death and claimed she had been shot "in the belief that she was a member of the British Army garrison" at nearby Dortmund.
- 11 September: a number of mortars were fired at a Royal Air Force radar station south of Belfast. No injuries were reported.
- 16 September: a British soldier was shot dead by an IRA sniper during an attack on Coalisland British Army base, County Tyrone while he was fixing a radio mast on the roof. His body dangled from a safety line until he was eventually cut down.
- 22 September: eleven Royal Marines were killed and 22 other soldiers injured when the IRA bombed their barracks in Deal, Kent, England.
- 1 October: a 500 lb (230 kg) IRA van bomb badly damaged the RUC base and several homes on the same street in Randalstown, County Antrim.
- 4 October: a civilian was shot dead by the IRA on Cavehill Road, Belfast. The Sunday Tribune reported that he had been killed by mistake, and that a loyalist paramilitary was the intended target. The IRA's Belfast Brigade issued an apology and claimed it had been a case of mistaken identity.
- 8 October: an RUC officer was killed by an IRA booby-trap bomb attached to his car outside his home on Dalboyne Gardens, Lisburn. The officer was a Superintendent and the sub-divisional commander for Newcastle, County Down.
- 9 October: an off-duty Territorial Army soldier (who was also a member of the UVF) was shot dead by the IRA in Kilrea, County Londonderry. He was shot a number of times in the head as he waited for collection by his employer.
- 15 October: an RUC Reserve officer and his wife narrowly escaped injury after a bomb detonated underneath their car in Moy, County Armagh.
- 18 October: a member of Ulster Resistance was shot dead by the IRA at his home near Lurgan, County Armagh. Three IRA volunteers entered his shop, which sold loyalist regalia, and shot him a number of times at close range.
- 20 October: an RUC officer was shot dead during an IRA ambush of an RUC armoured patrol near Newtownhamilton, County Armagh. A soldier was badly wounded, having been shot multiple times. The IRA unit pulled out in front of the RUC vehicle in a lorry and opened fire with a DShK heavy machine-gun. The car was hit 66 times.
- 26 October: IRA members opened fire on the car of an RAF corporal in West Germany. The car had stopped at a petrol station snack bar near RAF Wildenrath and inside it were the corporal, his wife, and their six-month-old daughter. The corporal and his daughter were killed; his wife suffered shock. The IRA expressed regret for the child's death and claimed its members did not know she was in the car.
- 26 October: an IRA unit launched a multiple mortar attack on Crossmaglen British Army base, County Armagh.
- 29 October: the IRA forced a civilian worker to carry a bomb in his car into Carrickmore RUC station, County Tyrone. RUC officers cleared the area and the explosion caused significant damage to the base.
- 3 November: a 1,600 lb (730 kg) van bomb exploded outside an RUC base in Derry. There were no injuries.
- 3 November: several railway lines in Northern Ireland remain closed following bomb alerts which began two days previously. IRA bombs and hoaxes had closed the Belfast-Dublin line on at least eighty occasions since December 1988.
- 4 November: a rocket was fired at an RUC land rover in West Belfast. Two RUC officers and two civilians were hurt.
- 4 November: IRA volunteers disarmed and abandoned a 3lb anti-personnel mine that had been planted at the side of the Gortacladdy Road. The IRA were forced to abandon the mine when the British Army saturated the area.
- 7 November: the IRA bombed the home of the RUC Assistant Chief Constable David Mellor in Drumbo, County Down.
- 14 November: a semtex bomb targeting British Army Lieutenant-General Sir David Ramsbotham was spotted by a painter and defused by police in west London. The IRA team had made a mistake, car the bomb was attached to actually belonged to a neighbour.
- 15 November: a contractor worked for the British army was killed by an IRA bomb underneath his car in Moneymore.
- 17 November: a UDR soldier was shot dead by the IRA outside Drumad British Army base, Armagh town.
- 18 November: three British soldiers were killed as their mobile patrol vehicle passed a derelict cottage which had been booby-trapped by the IRA near Rathfriland, County Down. The bomb contained almost 400 kg of explosive. A fourth soldier was badly wounded.
- 18 November: a British Army staff sergeant lost both legs and his wife was also injured by an IRA bomb planted under the wheel-arch of their car in Colchester, England. He was one of three members of the security forces who foiled a loyalist assassination attempt on Sinn Féin president Gerry Adams in 1984.
- 27 November: two British soldiers were wounded by an IRA bomb in Poleglass, Belfast.
- 27 November: the IRA planted six bombs at Belfast Harbour Airport. Three of them exp'loded, damaging a number of aircraft. The three other devices were defused.
- 28 November: the IRA left a 500 lb (230 kg) bomb in a hijacked tractor outside the RUC station in Belleek, County Fermanagh, following a gun and rocket attack. One rocket struck a house, and the bomb caused widespread damage in the village.
- 1 December: a part-time UDR soldier was shot and injured in an IRA ambush in the Northlands Road area of Derry.
- 4 December: the IRA left two incendiary devices inside a bus depot at Pennyburn, Derry in an attempt to lure security forces into a trap. The incendiary devices and the booby-trap bomb were defused by the British Army.
- 7 December: the IRA detonated a 500 lb (230 kg) van bomb in Lisburn injuring twenty-one people and causing widespread damage to buildings, including a Presbyterian Church.
- 11 December: three British soldiers were slightly injured in a bomb blast, of two bomb explosions in the centre of Derry.
- 13 December: two British soldiers were killed and one wounded during an IRA improvised armoured truck attack on Derryard checkpoint, near Rosslea, County Fermanagh. The attack was the only recorded use of a military flamethrower by the IRA.
- 17 December: the IRA detonated a van bomb along the main Belfast-Dublin road south of Newry, County Down. Armed IRA volunteers were spotted in the vicinity shortly before the bombing.
- 18 December: the IRA planted a 270 kg car bomb in Rathfriland, County Down, outside the homes of members of the British security services. The device only partially exploded, causing moderate damage.
- 22 December: two IRA members were arrested while transporting explosives in Newgale, Wales.

== See also ==
- Timeline of Continuity Irish Republican Army actions
- Timeline of Real Irish Republican Army actions
- Timeline of Irish National Liberation Army actions
- Timeline of Ulster Volunteer Force actions
- Timeline of Ulster Defence Association actions
- Timeline of the Northern Ireland Troubles
- List of attacks on British aircraft during The Troubles
