= 1991 British Army Lynx shootdown =

Helicopter downed by the Provisional IRA over Northern Ireland

1991 British Army Gazelle shootdown
- Part of The Troubles and Operation Banner
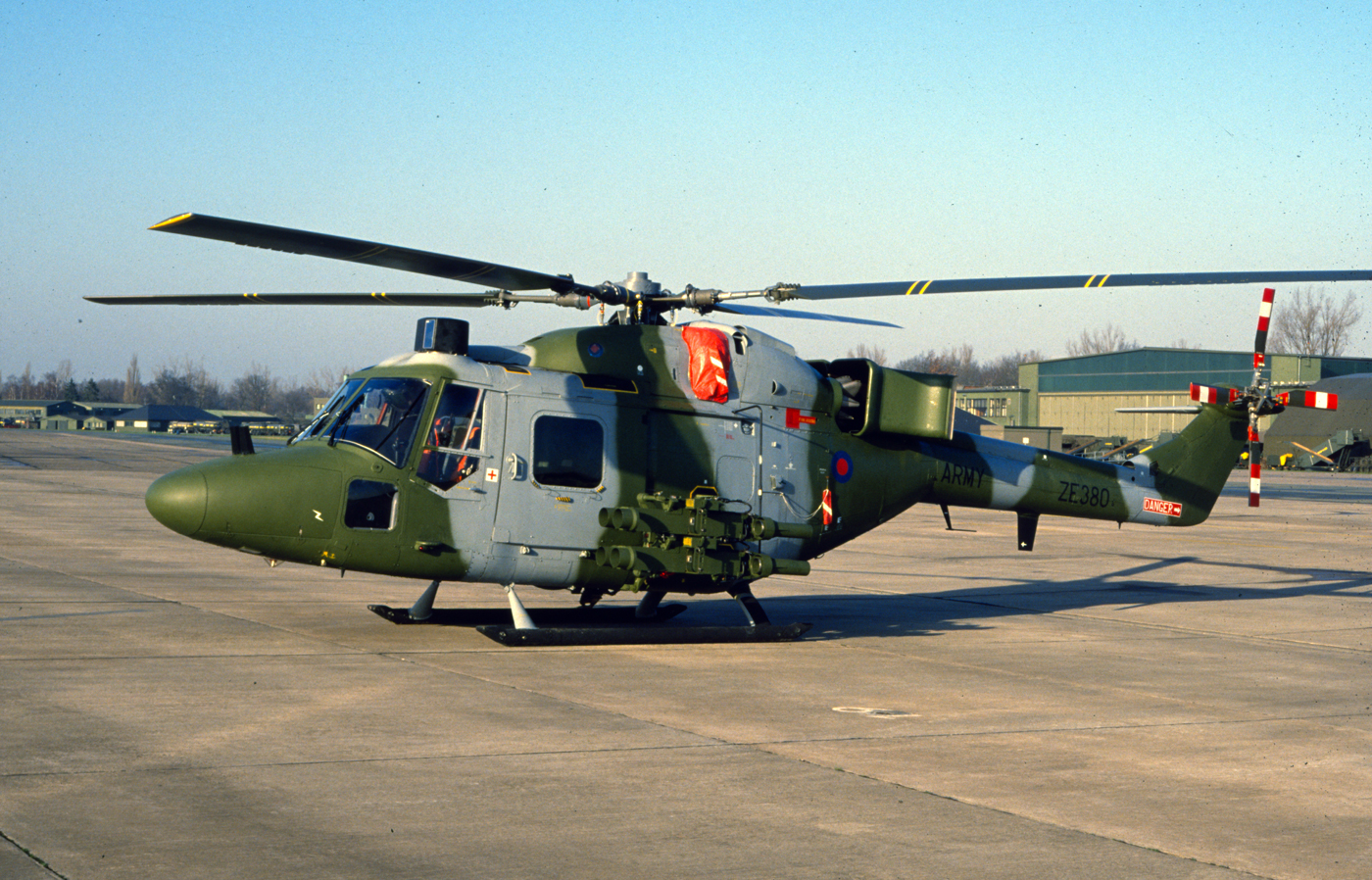
- Lynx ZE380 in 1987

- Location: 54°4′42.09″N 6°36′27.41″W; Crossmaglen, County Armagh, Northern Ireland
- Date: 13 February 1991; 15:18 (GMT)
- Target: British Army helicopter
- Attack type: Shooting
- Deaths: 0
- Injuries: 0
- Perpetrator: Provisional IRA

On 13 February 1991, an Army Air Corps (AAC) Westland Lynx Mk7, serial number ZE380, was shot down by the Provisional Irish Republican Army (IRA) in the vicinity of Crossmaglen, County Armagh, in Northern Ireland. The IRA's South Armagh Brigade ambushed the aircraft while approaching the joint British Army-RUC base in Crossmaglen using automatic rifles, general-purpose machine guns and heavy machine guns. The heavily damaged helicopter was forced to crash-land in an open field; the aircraft and its crew were eventually recovered by British forces.

== Background ==
In 1976 southern County Armagh was declared off-limits by the British Army to routine military vehicle traffic, including patrols, because the danger posed by an IRA landmine attack was considered too great. As a result, all regular military movement and resupply missions to British Army outposts across South Armagh became the responsibility of helicopters alone. This policy was criticised by politicians and British military figures because it left South Armagh under the de facto control of the IRA. This reliance on helicopters made the British security base at Bessbrook Mills, County Armagh, the busiest heliport in Europe, with an average of 600 flights arriving and departing every week.

The helicopter was the British Army's lifeline in the region so making the air corridor untenable had become a key priority for the IRA in South Armagh and other border areas. Most of the large-scale attacks on British Army helicopters carried out by the IRA during The Troubles took place in South Armagh.

In the mid-1980s the Provisional IRA received a consignment (twenty-six total) of Soviet 12.7mm DShK heavy machine guns from Libya, greatly enhancing the organisation's anti-air capability. Libyan leader Muammar Gaddafi also donated forty 7.62 mm FN MAG general-purpose machine guns to the IRA. In June 1988 the IRA in the South Armagh employed the Libyan anti-air weaponry for the first time when they shot down a British Lynx helicopter over Aughanduff Mountain. In February 1990 a British Gazelle helicopter was shot down in a border area between Augher and Derrygorry, County Tyrone, by an IRA active service unit from the East Tyrone Brigade.

== Shootdown incident ==
On 13 February 1991 Lynx helicopter ZE380 was hauling an underslung load from Bessbrook to the joint British Army-RUC base at Crossmaglen. To accommodate the underslung load the pilots had to fly relatively low and were restricted to a maximum speed of 60 knots; internal cargo stowage which needed to be unloaded on the ground left helicopters vulnerable to attack from IRA mortars. A second Lynx helicopter, not carrying any cargo, was assigned to a support role for ZE380. Both aircraft mounted general-purpose machine guns in door mounts. At 15:18 approximately one kilometre north-east of Crossmaglen whilst in the descent at an altitude between five and eight-hundred feet, ZE380 came under automatic fire, including tracer rounds.

The IRA reported that two active service units armed with 12.7mm heavy machine guns at separate positions opened fire on the aircraft. Afterwards the British Army recovered 12.7mm cases, 7.62mm single cases and 7.62 machine gun links from the area surrounding Crossmaglen's health centre. At least one of the DShK heavy machineguns was mounted on a lorry in an improvised armoured firing position which a crewman on ZE380 later said resembled a sangar. Initial reports issued by the Royal Ulster Constabulary (RUC) stated a second firing point beside St Joseph's High School had been identified.

ZE380 was struck by nine rounds in total, seven 12.7mm and two 7.62mm rounds, causing extensive damage to the aircraft and forcing it to land in a field by the Drummill Road near Silverbridge. An internal incident report described the aircraft as having been "shot down". However, despite the damage dealt to the airframe the crew escaped injury. After making an emergency landing the crew established a defensive perimeter; the IRA reported firing at downed aircraft but this account wasn't corroborated by the crew. The second Lynx, undamaged, landed nearby but the crew of ZE380, concerned that locals sympathetic to the IRA might destroy the downed aircraft outright, opted to maintain their position at the site, armed with the GPMG and two compact HK53 carbines. At 17:33 the crew were recovered by an RAF Puma helicopter and later the stricken Lynx was airlifted by a Chinook heavy-lift helicopter to RAF Aldergrove in County Antrim.

The attack, carried out by the IRA from behind Crossmaglen's health centre, was filmed by a Dublin television crew.

== Aftermath ==
A British Army board of inquiry commissioned in the aftermath of the shootdown found that despite the presence of door gunners and a mutually supporting aircraft "the terrorists were not deterred" and that it was "only by a stroke of luck" that the crew weren't killed. The board praised the actions of the crew but noted that current helicopter simulators offered no training in "hostile engagement scenarios" nor was there any training in battle damage assessment in flight. The board also observed that the door gunner's body armour was inadequate, only covering the front of his person. The board recommended that flying of underslung loads into "hostile areas" cease, that a "more effective weapons system" be fitted to aircraft and a study into protection of Lynx vulnerable and vital components be undertaken "as a matter of urgency".

Journalist and author Brendan O'Brien writing on the incident commented:

In security terms, the significant factor was that no RUC or British Army personnel came on the scene for a protracted period of time. This allowed the lorry and car to escape undetected and unhindered, even though the RUC/Army base was within 50 yards. They would have heard the shooting but would not risk further attack on the ground.

== See also ==
- 1978 British Army Gazelle downing
- 1988 British Army Lynx shootdown
- 1990 British Army Gazelle shootdown
- 1994 British Army Lynx shootdown
- Battle of Newry Road
- List of attacks on British aircraft during The Troubles
- Chronology of Provisional Irish Republican Army actions (1990–1991)

== Bibliography ==
- Taylor, Steven (2018). Air War Northern Ireland: Britain's Air Arms and the 'Bandit Country' of South Armagh: Operation Banner, 1969-2007. Barnsley, South Yorkshire: Pen & Sword Aviation. ISBN 9781526721556. OCLC 1058893631.
- Harnden, Toby (2000). 'Bandit Country': The IRA and South Armagh. London: Hodder & Stoughton. ISBN 9780340717370. OCLC 123294763.
