= List of attacks on British aircraft during The Troubles =

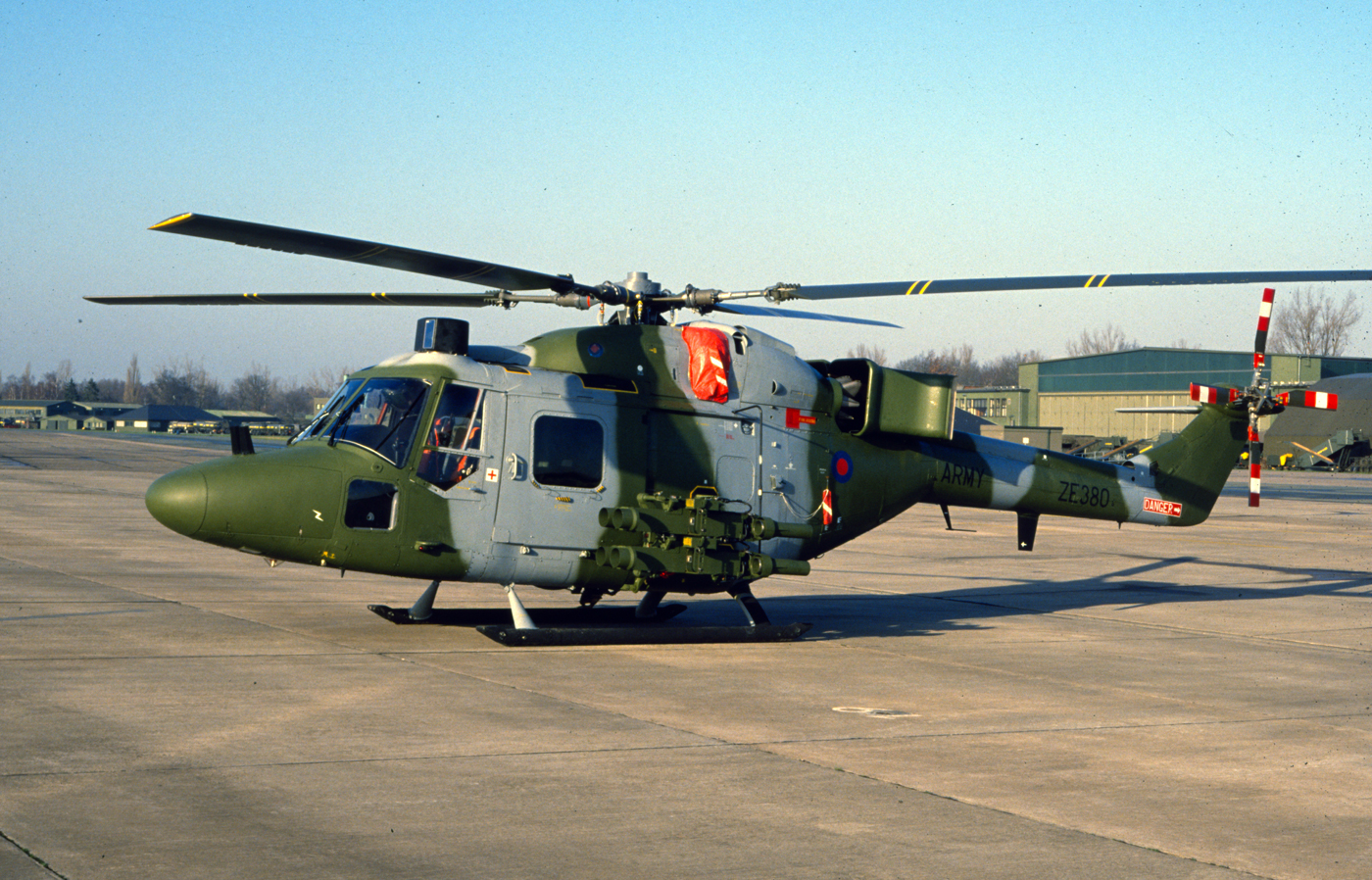
British Army Lynx ZE380 as seen in 1987. This helicopter was shot down by the IRA on 13 February 1991 in South Armagh.

This is a list of attacks on British aircraft, both civilian and military, during The Troubles, an armed conflict that took place in Northern Ireland during the late 20th century, also known internationally as the Northern Ireland Conflict. The page also records instances in which the target were airstrips or helipads. All the incidents listed took place as part of the Provisional IRA armed campaign in Northern Ireland, most of them carried out against British Army Air Corps helicopters. The strategic goal of the IRA was to make the continued deployment of British garrisons in South Armagh and other border areas untenable. Since the mid-1970s, all resupply of these bases had to be conducted by helicopters departing from the heliport at Bessbrook Mills barracks because improvised explosive devices and ambushes severely restricted the British army's ability to move troops and supplies by road. The South Armagh Brigade made the southern area of County Armagh the most dangerous operational area for British helicopters in Northern Ireland.

== 1970-79 ==
- 3 July 1970 - A Sioux helicopter carrying 39th Infantry Brigade commander, Brigadier Peter Hudson, was forced to make an emergency landing in the belief that the rotorcraft had been hit by small arms fire during the Belfast riots that became known as the "Falls curfew".
- 9 October 1970 - A Sioux helicopter searching for militants who had blown up a customs post in County Fermanagh was fired on from across the border in the village of Cloghoge, County Cavan. A single round struck the aircraft's radio.
- 10 August 1971 - A British Army helicopter was hit by a sniper's bullet as it flew over Belfast. The pilot and aircraft were reportedly saved by a "reinforced shell".
- 13 August 1971 - A British Army helicopter was fired upon as it flew over the Bogside area of Derry. There were no reported hits.
- 19 September 1971 - A helicopter supporting an ambushed Royal Ulster Constabulary (RUC) patrol under attack at Forkhill, County Armagh was engaged by IRA members, who fired fifteen to twenty shots before retreating across the border.
- 19 September 1971 - An RAF helicopter flying over Belfast was fired upon.
- 13 October 1971 - A helicopter supporting British Army sappers preparing to sabotage a road at Dungooley, on the Louth-Armagh border, was forced to withdraw after coming under fire from an IRA force 40-strong during an engagement that lasted an hour and in which one British soldier was seriously injured.
- 13 October 1971 - A Sioux helicopter of the 16th/5th The Queen's Royal Lancers supporting sappers preparing to sabotage a road in County Tyrone came under small arms fire from three gunmen at Castlederg, scoring two hits. The pilot was forced to make a precautionary landing six miles away. The helicopter had been hit twice, striking the oil tank.
- 23 October 1971 - A British Army helicopter supporting British soldiers attempting to forcibly prevent civilians from repairing roads cratered the previous day came under automatic fire, as did the soldiers, between the Clonoony salient and Clones, County Monaghan.
- 29 October 1971 - A British military helicopter came under fire while patrolling in the Derry area. Three shots were fired but "no damage was caused".
- 30 October 1971 - A British Army helicopter came under fire near a road that been bombed by the British Army at Teemore, County Fermanagh. British soldiers in the area were also fired upon, and on the same day eight border customs posts were destroyed in bombings.
- 7 November 1971 - A British military helicopter came under fire while flying over the Brandywell area of Derry. Fourteen shots were fired but none hit.
- 8 November 1971 - A British Army helicopter came under fire during an attack on British soldiers who were using a bulldozer to sabotage the road to Kiltyclogher on the Fermanagh side of the border.
- 11 November 1971 - A helicopter was fired on from across the border while landing near Belleek RUC station, County Fermanagh. Four shots were fired at the aircraft but none hit. Soldiers returned fire and reportedly injured a man on the Donegal side of the border.
- 11 November 1971 - A British Army helicopter was fired on from the Flagstaff-Omeath area while flying along the border near Newry, County Armagh. Provisional IRA leader Joe Cahill was addressing a ceremony commemorating the Edentubber martyrs in the vicinity. Twenty-five shots were fired but none hit.
- 17 November 1971 - A British Army helicopter was fired on in Derry, three shots were fired but the aircraft wasn't hit.
- 23 November 1971 - A British Army helicopter was fired on in Derry, fifteen or seventeen shots were fired but there were no reported injuries.
- 29 November 1971 - A British Army helicopter was fired on in the Long Tower area of Derry, three shots were fired but there were no reported injuries.
- 6 December 1971 - A British Army helicopter was fired upon from the Kildrum Gardens area of the Creggan, Derry, during heavy clashes that erupted when a 500-strong British search force attempted to enter the Creggan and Bogside areas.
- 7 December 1971 - A British Army helicopter was fired upon in Derry. A single gunman fired four shots but none hit.
- 10 December 1971 - A helicopter and a Ferret armoured car were fired on while attending a cattle inspection post which had just been bombed near Killeen customs post outside Newry, County Armagh. One soldier was shot; the injury was determined be self-inflicted.
- 13 December 1971 - A British Army helicopter came under fire in the vicinity of the Creggan area of Derry, reportedly eleven shots were fired at the aircraft but no hits were reported.
- 30 December 1971 - A British Army helicopter was fired upon in Derry; the Provisional IRA claimed to have hit and damaged the aircraft but this was denied by the British Army.
- 30 December 1971 - A British Army helicopter responding to the hijacking and burning of a bus at Aghalane Bridge on the Fermanagh-Cavan border was fired upon.
- 13 January 1972 - A Royal Marines Sioux helicopter was fired at and hit in Derry while carrying out a reconnaissance mission. The aircraft flew back to its base and landed safely.
- 9 February 1972 - A helicopter was fired upon shortly after a bomb wrecked a telephone repeater station at a border post at Killean, County Armagh.
- 27 February 1972 - A helicopter was fired upon while hovering over the Creggan Estate in Derry, the British Army reported.
- 19 April 1972 - A helicopter was fired upon while circling near Ballygawley, County Tyrone but there were no reported injuries and the helicopter returned to base safely. A dozen shots were fired.
- 15 June 1972 - A helicopter was fired upon while flying between Belleek and Garrison, County Fermanagh. The militants also detonated a claymore mine but the helicopter was undamaged. The crew returned fire but scored no hits.
- 24 June 1972 - An RAF Sioux helicopter, damaged after an accidental crash-landing, received small arms fire near Dungiven town, County Londonderry, in the course of an IRA bomb and gunfire ambush on the convoy transporting it to RAF Aldergrove. The helicopter pilot was wounded.
- 12 July 1972 - A British Army helicopter came under automatic fire while flying over the Lower Falls area of Belfast but wasn't hit.
- 18 July 1972 - A helicopter came under fire from armed men while flying over the Andersonstown area of Belfast.
- 18 July 1972 - A British Army helicopter came under fire while flying over Bangor, County Down; four shots were fired from the River Road area. The crew escaped injury and the airframe was undamaged.
- 19 July 1972 - A British Army helicopter came under "heavy sniper fire" north of Strabane, County Tyrone, according to a Provisional IRA statement.
- 31 July 1972 - A Westland Scout helicopter carrying a battalion commander was fired upon while flying above the Creggan, Derry during Operation Motorman. It was serving as an airborne command post to coordinate ground operations.
- 10 August 1972 - A Sioux helicopter was fired at and forced to pull out while responding to an IRA attack on a British Army permanent checkpoint in Crossmaglen.
- 18 October 1971 - A British Army helicopter of the 16th/5th The Queen's Royal Lancers came under fire in two separate incidents within an hour while flying along the border at Laghtfoggy, near Castlederg, County Tyrone.
- 25 October 1972 - A British Army helicopter ferrying wounded soldiers to Musgrave Park Hospital, Belfast was fired upon. Other helicopters in the vicinity were also fired upon and subsequently withdrawn from the area.
- 25 October 1972 - A British Army helicopter providing observation support for an Argyll and Sutherland Highlanders patrol under fire was shot at along the border with County Louth.
- 2 November 1972 - A Scout helicopter was fired at by seven IRA members at Moybane near Crossmaglen. Soldiers onboard returned fire with their issued rifles. Neither side scored any hits.
- 14 December 1972 - A Sioux helicopter conducting a reconnaissance mission was fired at by several IRA members armed with M1 Garand rifles near Crossmaglen. Six rounds hit the helicopter slightly injuring an observer and causing damage to the aircraft. The pilot was forced to make an emergency landing at Crossmaglen base. The pilot also reported that a rocket exploded in front of the aircraft, almost certainly fired from an RPG-7 anti-tank rocket launcher.
- 15 December 1972 - A Sioux helicopter came under fire from militants operating from the Drumarg Estate in Armagh town. Six shots were fired at the aircraft, but none hit.
- 12 January 1973 - A British Army helicopter was fired at in the Millbrook Bridge area along the Donegal-Derry border. A British Army patrol investigating the shooting was also fired upon and a gun battle ensued.
- 4 February 1973 - A British Army helicopter was fired at but wasn't hit while carrying out a routine patrol at Newtownbutler, County Fermanagh.
- 8 March 1973 - A British Army helicopter came under fire while hovering over Strabane, County Tyrone.
- 20 March 1973 - A British Army helicopter received several shots in the vicinity of Aughnacloy and Clogher in County Tyrone.
- 21 July 1973 - A British Army helicopter investigating an explosion which destroyed a disused house near Clady, County Tyrone, came under fire from County Donegal.
- 25 October 1973 - A British Army helicopter was fired at but reported no hits at Newtownhamilton, County Armagh.
- 15 November 1973 - A helicopter avoided being hit by an RPG-7 rocket while searching for an IRA unit responsible for a large-scale gun and bomb assault on the joint British Army/RUC base in Keady, County Armagh, where an IRA member, Micheal McVerry, had been killed.
- 17 February 1974 - An Army Air Corps helicopter came under fire at Gortoral Bridge, County Fermanagh, but there were no reported casualties.
- 7 March 1974 - A British Army helicopter was fired upon by a lone gunman with a rifle while flying near Pomeroy, County Tyrone.
- 8 March 1974 - A helicopter was fired on during an eighty-minute long engagement between British soldiers and gunmen across the border near Middletown, County Armagh.
- 6 April 1974 - A Sioux helicopter received over one hundred rounds, several of which hit the helicopter, while flying low over on border patrol near Crossmaglen.
- 19 June 1974 - A British Army helicopter taking off from a base in the Creggan area of Derry was believed to be the target of five shots fired in the Carrickgreagh Gardens area.
- 23 July 1974 - A 2 pounds (0.91 kg) gelignite bomb was found aboard a British Airways flight from Aldergrove Airport, near Belfast, to London, following a telephoned warning. The flight made an emergency landing at Manchester Airport. The IRA claimed it had planted the bomb "to prove it could breach airport security", and that it had not been set to explode.
- 3 September 1974 - An Air Army Corps Scout helicopter, carrying a four-man strong Royal Marines team landed in Ballsmill, just 200 meters from the border and not far from Silverbridge . Four IRA members had set up an ambush at an abandoned building and fired 79 shots at the aircraft. The marines returned fire, but the militants fled in car to the border. The Scout was hit eight times, but the pilot managed to fly it back to Forkhill.
- 8 September 1974 - A British Army helicopter came under fire while flying above the Creggan area of Derry following a large-scale arrest operation in the city. None of the shots hit.
- 22 September 1974 - A British Army helicopter came under "heavy" rifle and machine gun fire while conducting a reconnaissance flight along the Tyrone-Monaghan border near Clogher and was forced to land in a field. The British Army denied local reports that two soldiers were injured. An IRA statement said the 3rd Battalion of the East Tyrone Brigade was responsible.
- 6 December 1974 - A British Army helicopter came under "heavy" machine gun fire near the Louth-Armagh border. There were no reported injuries.
- 18 January 1975 - A British Army helicopter was fired on near Strabane.
- 14 December 1975 - A Scout helicopter was fired on and hit twice while flying south-west of Crossmaglen, forcing the pilot to make a precautionary landing.
- 31 January 1976 - A Scout helicopter came under fire from a position close to Kilnasaggart Bridge, near Jonesborough, County Armagh. The aircraft was hit three times but there were no injuries.
- 8 March 1976 - The IRA launched 14 mortar bombs at Aldergrove Airport (now Belfast International Airport) in County Antrim from a battery hidden in a sand lorry. Four projectiles exploded in the car park wrecking several vehicles and another hit the arrivals hut. The airport had been evacuated following an IRA warning.
- 15 April 1976 - An RAF Wessex helicopter ferrying a number of paratroopers from Bessbrook to Crossmaglen was hit and badly damaged by automatic fire and an anti-tank RPG-7 rocket while in the process of landing on destination. The pilot, Mike Johnston, performed an emergency landing on a football pitch next to the barracks and wheeled the helicopter within the grounds of the base. Although seriously damaged, RAF pilot David Morgan flew the crippled machine back to Bessbrook on a single engine. The Wessex endured several weeks of repairs before returning to service.
- June 1976 - The Official IRA reported firing on a helicopter of the British Army's Royal Scots Regiment in the Newry area. They claimed to have struck the aircraft and that were there no known casualties.
- 20 December 1976 - A British Army helicopter came under automatic fire and was hit by a single round while patrolling in the Drummuckavall border area of County Armagh. No mechanical damage was inflicted and the aircraft landed in Crossmaglen.
- 4 October 1977 - An RAF Wessex helicopter was hit by an IRA sniper in Jonesborough, in South Armagh. A single shot hit and shattered the helicopter's windscreen, forcing the pilot to land in an open field.
- 17 February 1978 - An Army Air Corps Gazelle helicopter carrying Green Jackets Lieutenant Colonel Ian Corden-Lloyd crashed near the site of an ongoing engagement between a British army patrol and an IRA active service unit. The pilot attempted an evasive manoeuver while under heavy fire from an M60 machine gun, but lost control of the machine and hit the ground. The Lieutenant Colonel was killed and a captain and the pilot seriously wounded.
- 21 September 1978 - An IRA bomb attack on Eglinton airfield, County Londonderry, destroyed four civilian planes, two hangars and the terminal building.
- 3 March 1979 - An Army Air Corps Gazelle was lured into an ambush near Glassdrumman, South Armagh, by an IRA unit setting up a bogus mortar attack in order to get the helicopter into a "killing zone", The IRA team used M60 machine guns and hit the machine nine times. The Gazelle was heavily damaged, and both the pilot and a Grenadier Guards Major were wounded. In spite of his injuries, the pilot flew the battered helicopter back to Crossmaglen base.
- 11 July 1979 - An RAF helicopter was hit by rifle fire after landing a joint RUC-British Army patrol at Lough Ross on the Armagh, Monaghan border. Fire was returned and they believed they scored a hit on an armed IRA man, one of three, who escaped across the border.
- 27 August 1979 - An RAF Wessex helicopter was damaged by the explosion of an IRA bomb while evacuating casualties during the Warrenpoint Ambush.
- 10 September 1979 - An Army Air Corps Gazelle helicopter was hit by rifle fire as it flew along the border near Cullaville, County Armagh. The radio was damaged and a small electrical fire started but the pilot and passengers reached Crossmaglen barracks unharmed.
- 13 November 1979 - An Army Air Corps Beaver reconnaissance fixed-wing plane was hit five times by small arms fire while collecting photographic evidence from an IRA checkpoint near Crossmaglen. A Wessex helicopter flying above the Beaver was unable to intervene.

== 1980-89 ==
- 7 May 1981 - An Army Air Corps Gazelle was hit by machine gun fire near Crossmaglen as it flew across the main Derry-Dublin road where IRA members were hijacking and torching vehicles following the death of IRA prisoner Bobby Sands. The pilot managed to return to base at Crossmaglen barracks.
- 20 July 1982 - An RAF Wessex was hit nine times over Croslieve mountain, west of Forkhill, by rounds fired from six different positions with automatic rifles, M60 and a .50 Browning machine gun, allegedly recovered by the IRA from an Allied aircraft that crashed on Lough Neagh during World War II.
- 9 August 1982 - An RAF Wessex was hit by small arms fire near Jonesborough, County Armagh and the master air loadmaster received a minor shrapnel injury.
- 12 May 1983 - The same RAF Wessex targeted on 20 July 1982 was engaged once again by an IRA unit while carrying a team of seven Royal Marines over Aughanduff Mountain, near Silverbridge, with the same weapons used in the previous incident. The IRA unit attacked the Wessex from six firing points, spending 274 rounds. The helicopter was hit 23 times on its fuselage and main rotor blades, and suffered damage to the port engine, the hydraulics and fuel tanks. Two soldiers were injured, one seriously.
- 22 June 1983 - An RAF Wessex received fire from an IRA Mark-10 mortar battery while approaching Crossmaglen barracks. The helicopter dropped its sling-lifted cargo into the street during the evasive manoeuver. The rotorcraft flew away unscathed, but a watchtower was damaged and a soldier wounded.
- 30 December 1983 - A British Army helicopter came under fire after intercepting armed raiders trying to hold up a Securicor cash-in-transit van at Creggan Bridge near Crossmaglen. The gunmen were forced to flee in their vehicle and escaped across the border.
- 21 April 1985 - A British Army helicopter came under fire from the IRA at Glasdrummond in South Armagh. There were no reported injuries.
- 24 May 1985 - An RAF Wessex was hit by sustained machine gun fire as it flew over Crossmaglen from a pair of .50 Browning machine guns and an M60 machine gun mounted in the back of a lorry, concealed beneath a tarpaulin until immediately before firing. The Wessex diverted to Bessbrook and a soldier at Crossmaglen base opened fire; the IRA members continued to fire as they escaped across the border. Rounds struck the airframe but there were no reported injuries.
- 23 June 1985 - An RAF Wessex came under mortar fire as it landed at Crossmaglen base. Three of four projectiles fired exploded near the helicopter smashing its windows but according to a British Army spokesman there were no injuries and the aircraft flew to the British base at Bessbrook. The spokesman claimed the mortars operated on a timing device and the helicopter's presence was coincidental.
- 18 November 1986 - A helicopter came under mortar fire as it took off from the joint British Army-RUC base at Forkhill, County Armagh. The helicopter, believed to be the target, escaped undamaged but the three (six according to the IRA) projectiles caused superficial damage to the fortified base. The firing point was the nearby Mccreesh Park estate.
- 23 June 1988 - An Army Air Corps Lynx, flown by a Royal Navy pilot, was shot down over Aughanduff Mountain by an IRA unit armed with three 7.62mm FN MAG general-purpose machine guns, two 12.7mm DShK heavy machine guns and assorted rifles. The pilot crash-landed the aircraft in an open field near Cashel Lough Upper. One British serviceman was wounded. The IRA claimed their volunteers, armed with machine guns and an RPG-7 rocket launcher, quickly moved to the vicinity of the crash site but withdrew after failing to find the wreckage.
- 3 July 1989 - Two civilian aircraft and the control tower of Belfast Harbour Airport were damaged by the explosion of three IRA bombs.
- 27 November 1989 - A Short 360 civilian aircraft was destroyed by the IRA in yet another bomb attack on Belfast Harbour Airport.
- 13 December 1989 - An RAF Wessex supporting a counter-attack launched by a platoon of the King Own Scottish Borderers (KOSB) regiment was forced to take evasive action after coming under hostile fire from an IRA unit which had stormed Derryard checkpoint, County Fermanagh, using an improvised armoured truck.

== 1990-98 ==
- 11 February 1990 - An Army Air Corps Gazelle was shot down over a border area between Augher and Derrygorry, County Tyrone, by an IRA active service unit from the East Tyrone Brigade. The helicopter received fire from two heavy machine guns and three automatic rifles. Three soldiers on board were wounded.
- 20 February 1990 - A Wessex helicopter spotted several IRA masked members carrying heavy weapons in a van and a car near Newtownhamilton, South Armagh. During the ensuing long chase, the IRA unit split, discarded arms and ammunition and changed vehicles at least eight times, in some cases by hijacking them. Three IRA volunteers in a Toyota Corolla were initially arrested by a party of three soldiers and two RUC officers who landed from the helicopter in Silverbridge. A crowd of 40 civilians quickly surrounded the security forces and attacked them with stones, allowing the escape of the IRA men. A number of automatic weapons were recovered in the aftermath by the RUC, among them two light machine guns.
- 25 September 1990 - An Army Air Corps Lynx was fired at with a DShK and two light machine guns mounted on a 4x4 pick up truck by IRA members while approaching Crossmaglen base to drop rations. One soldier on the ground was slightly wounded.
- 27 October 1990 - Two helicopters came under heavy machine gun fire near Corragunt along the Fermanagh-Monaghan border, according to an IRA statement. The RUC denied any attack occurred or any helicopters were hit.
- 31 January 1991 - An RAF Wessex, taking off from the British Army base at Forkhill, South Armagh, and carrying a number of soldiers, received a stream of up to 89 rounds from a heavy machine gun and a general purpose machine gun. The helicopter disengaged successfully after being hit by one bullet.
- 13 February 1991 - An Army Air Corps Lynx was shot down near Silverbridge after taking fire from the IRA while approaching Crossmaglen base. The helicopter, struck by seven 12.7mm and two 7.62mm rounds, jettisoned the supplies it was lifting before crash-landing. The door gunner did not return fire and the crew established a defensive perimeter around the downed aircraft while awaiting rescue. In the aftermath a Ministry of Defence report recommended that helicopters be fitted with "more effective weapons system" and extra armour for vital components as a matter of urgency, noting that it was only "by a stroke of luck" that the crew weren't killed or seriously injured.
- 15 February 1991 - An Army Air Corps Lynx helicopter that was extracting soldiers from the Duke of Edinburgh's Royal Regiment after a border patrol from St Angelo Barracks, Trory, County Fermanagh, became the target of automatic weapons on two different occasions; one while approaching the landing zone and the second when searching for the IRA firing position. The attack, claimed by the East Tyrone Brigade, took place south of Clogher, in County Tyrone. More than 360 rounds were fired from across the border. The helicopter was forced to abort the landing and return to base.
- 3 June 1991 -The British Army helicopter base at St Angelo in Enniskillen was the target of a botched IRA six-mortar round attack. Most of the bombs exploded inside the tubes, and an adjacent sawmill was heavily damaged. The IRA statement claims that the barracks itself sustained minor damage.
- 19 July 1991 - An RAF Wessex became the target of an IRA SA-7 surface-to-air missile near Kinawley in County Fermanagh. The missile failed to lock onto the helicopter and exploded on the ground. The IRA claimed they had fired an RPG-7.
- 2 August 1991 - An RAF Puma landing troops was targeted at Newtownhamilton barracks, South Armagh, by what author Chris Ryder describes as three "radio controlled warheads", whose explosions around the landing area forced the pilot to lift off. The next day, ordnance disposal teams found that the missiles were Mark-12 horizontal mortars, fired from a garage in the town center.
- 16 March 1992 - Two Army Air Corps Lynx were fired at by an IRA unit from the South Fermanagh Brigade armed with heavy machine guns near Rosslea, County Fermanagh. More than 1,000 rounds were spent.
- 29 May 1992 - An RAF Wessex dropped off soldiers of the Parachute Regiment near Cappagh, County Tyrone, where they spotted three individuals handling a GPMG stolen during unrest in Coalisland eleven days earlier. reportly foiling an IRA plot to attack a helicopter. One member of the three-man ASU was arrested by the RUC after fleeing in a car pursued by the Wessex. Republican politician Bernardette McAliskey suggested that the recovery of the machine gun was actually staged by the security forces as a publicity stunt. At the same time, it was revealed that during a "secret helicopter spy mission" in mid May an infra-red torch had fallen from a chopper on an area between Dungannon and Moy. The valuable item, used as an image intensifier, was the only one in the British Army inventory in Northern Ireland.
- 12 August 1992 - An RAF Wessex received fire from an AK-47 assault rifle at Strabane, County Tyrone, during a hot pursuit after a Green Jackets patrol was harassed with sniper fire. The IRA unit responsible for the attacks, fleeing the scene on a Ford Sierra, was engaged by soldiers manning a checkpoint, and one of its members was wounded. The militants' getaway was tracked by the helicopter, which led to the capture of the injured man.
- 8 January 1993 - An Army Air Corps Lynx was engaged with machine-gun fire at Mullan Bridge, Kinawley, County Fermanagh, while responding to an IRA mortar attack on a British army outpost. The Lynx door-gunner returned fire with a general purpose machine gun and hit a farm compound on the Republic's side of the border.
- 11 June 1993 - An RAF Puma had a narrow escape when a barrack buster Mark-15 mortar was fired at the helipad of the Army/RUC base at Crossmaglen shortly after take-off.
- 23 September 1993 - Four Army Air Corps Lynx were involved in a running gun battle with five IRA armed trucks after assault rifles and heavy machine guns were fired from the vehicles at an RAF Puma helicopter taking off from Crossmaglen barracks with the 3rd Infantry Brigade Commander on board. The Puma and a Lynx were hit and damaged. The engagement became known as the "Battle of Newry Road".
- 12 December 1993 - An Army Air Corps Lynx received automatic rifle fire (the IRA's report stated they used "heavy weapons") from members of the East Tyrone Brigade over the surroundings of Fivemiletown, County Tyrone, while searching for the perpetrators of an IRA ambush on an undercover RUC mobile patrol in the town, where two RUC constables from RUC Clogher base were killed. No hits were scored, but the IRA unit slipped away.
- 8-13 March 1994: The IRA launched a string of three Mark-10 mortar attacks in five days on Heathrow airport. In all, 12 mortar rounds were fired; none of them exploded, but the third attack forced to close down operations at Heathrow and Gatwick airports for two hours.
- 19 March 1994 - An Army Air Corps Lynx was shot down and destroyed by an IRA Mark-15 mortar round while landing at Crossmaglen helipad. Three soldiers and an RUC constable were wounded. Author Toby Harnden describes this action as the most successful attack on a helicopter by the IRA during the Troubles.
- 12 July 1994 - An RAF Puma was shot down over Newtownhamilton, County Armagh, by an IRA Mark-15 mortar round while carrying 11 soldiers and one RUC constable. The helicopter crashed on a football pitch. Only minor injuries were reported. The Puma sustained Category 3 or Category 4 damage on the RAF scale.
- 12 July 1997: In what is believed to have been the last action carried out by the South Armagh Brigade during the Troubles, a Mark-15 barrack buster mortar round exploded on waste ground beside Newtownhamilton base helipad, some 40 yards (37 m) from the barracks fence.

== See also ==
- List of chronologies of Provisional Irish Republican Army actions
- List of weapons used by the Provisional Irish Republican Army
- Improvised tactical vehicles of the Provisional IRA

== Bibliography ==
- Harnden, Toby (2000). Bandit Country: The IRA and South Armagh. Hodder & Stoughton. ISBN 0-340-71736-X
