= 1990 British Army Gazelle shootdown =

Helicopter downed by the Provisional IRA over Northern Ireland

- Part of The Troubles and Operation Banner
- British Army personnel inspecting the Gazelle's wreckage

- Location: 54°24′48″N 7°03′30″W between Augher and Derrygorry, Republic of Ireland–United Kingdom border
- Date: 11 February 1990; 16:30 (GMT)
- Target: British Army helicopter
- Attack type: Shooting
- Deaths: 0
- Injuries: 3 soldiers
- Perpetrators: Provisional IRA; East Tyrone Brigade

On 11 February 1990, an active service unit of the Provisional IRA East Tyrone Brigade shot down a British Army Gazelle helicopter (serial number ZB687) along the border between Northern Ireland and the Republic of Ireland. It took place between Augher in County Tyrone and Derrygorry in County Monaghan. The helicopter was hit several times by heavy machine-gun fire and crash-landed on an open field, injuring three members of its crew of four.

== Background ==
Since early December 1989, the British Army had been on alert in and around County Tyrone after a credible threat was made by a suspected member of the IRA about an imminent attack. On 13 December, a major assault took place when an IRA team, riding on an improvised armoured truck, raided a permanent vehicle checkpoint guarded by members of the King's Own Scottish Borderers (KOSB) regiment near Derryard, County Fermanagh, a few yards from the border with the Republic. Two soldiers were killed in an attack that involved the use of machine guns, rocket-propelled grenades and a flamethrower. While British officials focused on members of the IRA from County Monaghan, in the Republic, supported by others from Clogher, County Tyrone, author Ed Moloney asserts that the culprit was a flying column made up of IRA volunteers from different brigades, commanded by the East Tyrone Brigade's Michael "Pete" Ryan, who himself was shot dead in 1991 in the Coagh ambush. The execution of hit-and-run raids by the IRA was "professional" and "calculating", according to British military sources.

== Shootdown incident ==
On 11 February 1990, a patrol of the King's Own Scottish Borderers was sent to investigate a suspicious column of vehicles close to the border with the support of an unarmed Gazelle helicopter from the 656 Squadron, Army Air Corps. The motorcade was actually a diversionary manoeuvre set up by the East Tyrone Brigade to lure the troops into an ambush. As usual during the KOSB tour in Northern Ireland, the soldiers would be backed up by a helicopter. The main mission of the helicopters was to airlift patrols to different locations during a single day. Another key role was to scan the terrain for potential enemy ambushes and to block the IRA getaway by landing reinforcements on their escape route. It was never determined whether the Provisionals had previously planned the shooting of the Gazelle or the helicopter became a target of opportunity.

At 16:30, a local witness heard 50 to 60 shots fired, then she saw the helicopter skimming over an open field just north of the border, near Derrygorry, in the Republic. The Gazelle, serial number ZB687, was hit by several rounds and lost oil pressure. The crew were forced to crash-land the machine, which broke up on impact. The RUC and British Army sealed off the scene as an investigation was mounted. The official report confirmed that the Gazelle had been on a reconnaissance flight. Three crew members were wounded in the crash, one of them a sergeant major from the KOSB, who suffered spinal injuries. None of the injured was hit by gunfire. Another crewmember survived unscathed. The incident was covered by an ITN news report, which shows the helicopter wreckage being examined by Army technicians. The remains were kept under armed guard for further forensic analysis for several days before being removed from the field.

The Provisional IRA claimed in a statement that they had fired 300 rounds at the aircraft from two heavy machine-guns and three automatic rifles. Some sources have speculated whether the machine-guns were either Soviet-designed DShKs, part of the Libyan shipments to the IRA in the 1980s, or American M60s. The Gazelle was eventually written off. It was the first helicopter brought down in Northern Ireland by hostile fire since June 1988, when a Lynx was brought down in South Armagh.

== Aftermath ==
The Gazelle shootdown raised fears that the Provisional IRA could have in mind another high-profile action before the end of the KOSB tour.

After this and other attacks on security forces along the border in 1990, especially against permanent vehicle checkpoints, the troops were issued with .50 Browning machine guns and M203 grenade launchers. By 1992, the use of long-range weapons by the Provisionals, like mortars and heavy machine-guns, had forced the British Army to build its main checkpoints along the border one to five miles within Northern Ireland to avoid assaults launched from inside the Republic.

From 1990 until the first Provisional IRA ceasefire in 1994, there were several IRA actions involving heavy weapons in the border areas of Tyrone and Fermanagh, not far from the site where the Gazelle crashed, at least four of them involving British Army helicopters. on 15 February 1991, a Lynx came under machine gun fire while extracting British troops a few miles south of Clogher, in County Tyrone. More than 360 rounds were fired from across the border. The helicopter was forced to abort the landing and return to base. On 19 July 1991, the crew of a Wessex successfully dodged a surface-to-air missile at Kinawley, County Fermanagh. On 15 March 1992, a Provisional IRA unit fired more than 1,000 rounds at two helicopters from across the border near Roslea, County Fermanagh. In 1993, two helicopters were fired at in different circumstances, one of them with heavy machine guns on 8 January at Kinawley after a mortar attack on a British Army outpost, and the other with automatic rifles on 12 December near Fivemiletown, County Tyrone, after an ambush where two RUC officers from Clogher barracks were killed.

== See also ==
- 1978 British Army Gazelle downing
- 1988 British Army Lynx shootdown
- 1991 British Army Lynx shootdown
- 1994 British Army Lynx shootdown
- Battle of Newry Road
- Chronology of Provisional Irish Republican Army actions (1990–99)
- List of attacks on British aircraft during The Troubles
