= 1978 British Army Gazelle downing =

Helicopter downing incident

- Part of the Troubles and Operation Banner
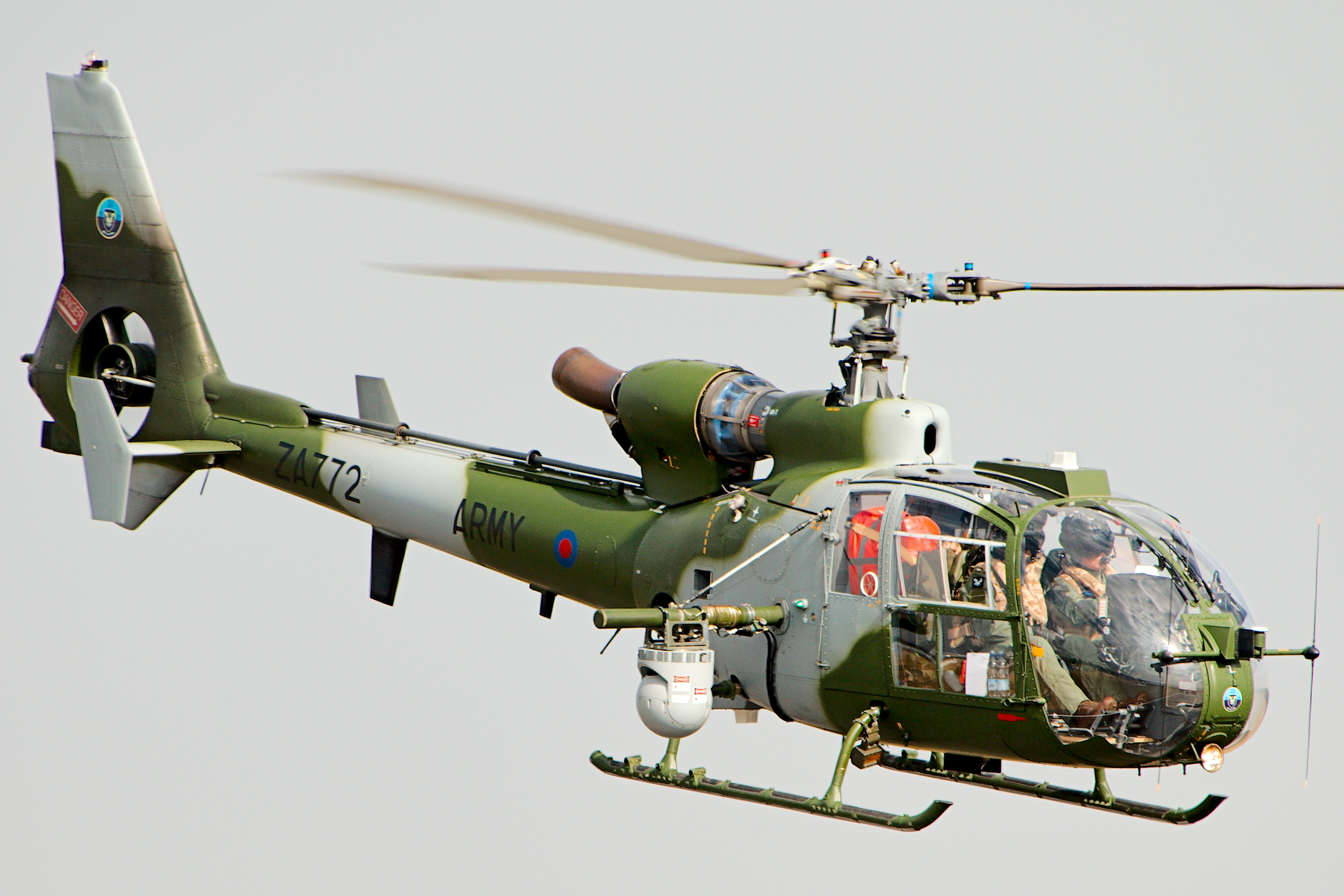
- A British Army Gazelle helicopter
Date	17 February 1978
Location	Jonesborough, southern County Armagh 54°5′10.15″N 6°21′59.12″W
Result	IRA victory

Belligerents
Provisional IRA	United Kingdom • British Army

Commanders and leaders
Unknown	Lt.Col Ian Corden-Lloyd †

Strength
1 active service unit	1 Army section 2 helicopters

Casualties and losses
Unknown	1 killed 2 wounded 1 helicopter lost
- Location within Northern Ireland

On 17 February 1978, a British Army Gazelle helicopter, serial number XX404, went down near Jonesborough, County Armagh, Northern Ireland, after being fired at by a Provisional IRA unit from the South Armagh Brigade. The IRA unit was involved at the time in a gun battle with a Green Jackets observation post deployed in the area, and the helicopter was sent in to support the ground troops. The helicopter crashed after the pilot lost control of the aircraft whilst evading ground fire.

Lieutenant-Colonel Ian Douglas Corden-Lloyd, 2nd Battalion Green Jackets commanding officer, died in the crash. The incident was overshadowed in the press by the La Mon restaurant bombing, which took place just hours later near Belfast.

== Background ==
By early 1978, the British Army forces involved in Operation Banner had recently replaced their ageing Bell H-13 Sioux helicopters for the more versatile Aérospatiale Gazelles. The introduction of the new machines increased the area covered on a reconnaissance sortie as well as the improved time spent in airborne missions. In the same period, the Provisional IRA received its first consignment of M60 machine guns from the Middle East, which were displayed by masked volunteers during a Bloody Sunday commemoration in Derry. Airborne operations were crucial for the British presence along the border, especially in south County Armagh, where the level of IRA activity meant that every supply and soldier had to be ferried in and out of their bases by helicopter since 1975.

The Royal Green Jackets had been in South Armagh since December 1977, and had already seen some action. Just a few days after arrival, two mortar rounds hit the C Company base at Forkhill, injuring a number of soldiers. In the aftermath of the attack, two Royal Ulster Constabulary (RUC) officers were wounded by a booby-trap while recovering the lorry where the mortar tubes were mounted. Two days later, a patrol near the border suffered a bomb and gun attack, leaving the commanding sergeant with severe head wounds. The sergeant was picked up from the scene by helicopter. He was later invalided from the British Army as a result of his injuries.

== Shooting and crash ==
On 17 January 1978, a Green Jackets observation post near the village of Jonesborough began to receive fire from the "March Wall", which drew parallel with the Irish border to the east, along the Dromad woods. The soldiers returned fire, but the short distance to the border and the open ground prevented them from advancing.

The Commanding Officer, Lieutenant Colonel Ian Corden-Lloyd, along with Captain Philip Schofield and Sergeant Ives flew from the battalion base at Bessbrook Mill to assess the situation and provide information to the troops. They were escorted by a Scout helicopter with an Airborne Reaction Force (ARF), comprising a medic and three soldiers from the 2nd Bn Light Infantry. While hovering over the scene of the engagement, the Gazelle received a barrage of 7.62 mm tracer rounds. The pilot lost control of the aircraft during a turn at high speed to avoid the stream of fire. The Gazelle (serial number XX404) hit a wall and crashed on a field, about 2 km from Jonesborough. According to the crew and passengers of the Scout, the Gazelle hit the ground twice after losing power, with its rotor blades hitting the soil following the second impact, and then cartwheeled across the field. The Scout landed the ARF still under IRA fire. The soldiers rushed to the wrecked helicopter, some 100 metres away from the site of the initial crash.

Corden-Lloyd was killed and the other two passengers were wounded. The machine came to rest on its right side with the pilot trapped inside the wreckage, but he survived thanks to his helmet. The IRA later claimed they had shot at the helicopter with an M60 machine gun. The IRA unit vanished into the Dromad woods to the Republic of Ireland. Some Gardaí witnessed the attack from the other side of the border.

== Aftermath ==
The gun battle and the shooting down of the Gazelle was displaced from the headlines by the deaths of twelve civilians in the La Mon restaurant bombing on the same day, some of whom were burned to death. The British Army downplayed the IRA's claim as published by An Phoblacht, that the helicopter was shot down, on the basis that no hits were found on the wreckage, but finally they acknowledged that the IRA action had caused the crash.

The death of Corden-Lloyd, a former Special Air Service officer, was deeply regretted by the British Army, who regarded him as promising. He was awarded a posthumous mention in despatches "in recognition of gallant and distinguished service in Northern Ireland". In 1973, Irish republicans had accused Corden-Lloyd and his subordinates of brutality against Belfast Catholics during an earlier tour of the Green Jackets in 1971, at the time of Operation Demetrius.

== See also ==
- 1990 British Army Gazelle shootdown
- 1988 British Army Lynx shootdown
- 1994 British Army Lynx shootdown
- Battle of Newry Road
- 1993 Fivemiletown ambush
- Chronology of Provisional Irish Republican Army actions (1970–79)
- List of attacks on British aircraft during The Troubles
- Provisional IRA South Armagh Brigade
