= 1988 British Army Lynx shootdown =

IRA helicopter shootdown in Northern Ireland

- Part of the Troubles
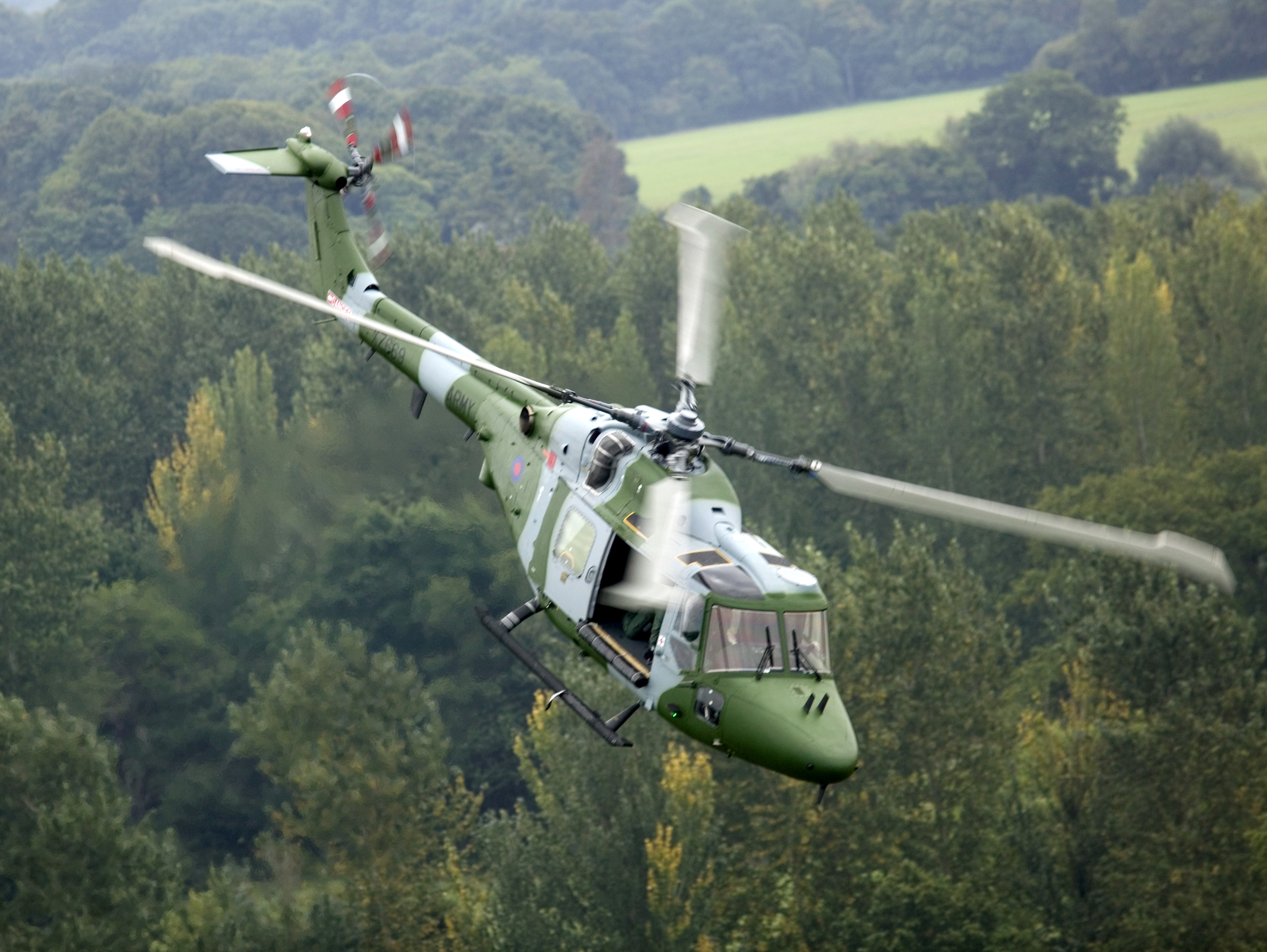
- A British Army Lynx helicopter

- Location: 54°7′45.6″N 6°31′14.9″W; Aughanduff, County Armagh, Northern Ireland
- Date: 23 June 1988; 12:55 (GMT)
- Target: British Army helicopter
- Attack type: Shooting
- Deaths: 0
- Injuries: 1
- Perpetrator: Provisional IRA

On 23 June 1988, an Army Air Corps (AAC) Westland Lynx, serial number XZ664, was shot down by the Provisional Irish Republican Army (IRA) near Aughanduff Mountain, County Armagh, in Northern Ireland. A unit of the IRA's South Armagh Brigade fired at the British Army helicopter using automatic rifles and heavy machine guns. The disabled helicopter was forced to crash-land in an open field; the aircraft and its crew were eventually recovered by British forces.

== Background ==
Since 1976, after a relentless series of roadside bombings and ambushes on military convoys, the British Army declared the area of South Armagh, roughly below a line stretching from Newtownhamilton to Newry, out of limits for military vehicles. Some exceptions were made, such as undercover civilian-type vehicles or, in certain occasions when heavy equipment or materials should be transported, lorries had to move through a series of checkpoints to reach their destination safely. Therefore, all military movement and resupply missions across South Armagh had to be carried out by helicopter. This decision bore criticism from both politicians and military officers, since this gave the IRA de facto control of South Armagh. This situation made the British security base at Bessbrook Mills, County Armagh, the busiest heliport in Europe, with an average of 600 flights in and out per week.

Due to this heavy reliance on air supply, the shooting down of helicopters had become a high priority for the IRA in this and other border regions. Most of the attacks on British Army helicopters carried out by the IRA during The Troubles took place in South Armagh.

In October 1979, the AAC in Northern Ireland replaced the Scout with the more versatile Lynx AH1.

== The attack ==
On 23 June 1988, Army Air Corps Lynx helicopter XZ664 departed from the British barracks at Crossmaglen toward its base at Bessbrook Mill. The pilot was Royal Navy Lieutenant David Richardson, attached to the Army Air Corps 665 sq. Meanwhile, a 12-man strong IRA unit, hidden in the slopes of Aughanduff Mountain and armed with two DShK heavy machine guns, three M60 machine guns and AK-47 assault rifles waited for the Lynx, aware of the route usually taken by the helicopters coming in from Crossmaglen.

At 12:55, some five kilometres from Silverbridge, as they approached the 234-metre high hill where the IRA men had taken positions, the aircraft was hit by 15 armour-piercing and incendiary rounds on its fuselage and rotors, and got into a spin. Control cables were cut, and one of the engines shut-down. The pilot made a hard landing in an open field near Cashel Lough Upper, in which one member of the crew was injured.

The IRA team, armed with machine guns and an anti-tank rocket launcher, searched for the crash site to finish the helicopter and its crew off, but they were unable to find it. The area was eventually secured by British Army patrols, and by the arrival of another Lynx carrying on an Airborne Reaction Force (ARF). The badly damaged Lynx was lifted off by a Royal Air Force Chinook helicopter. The incident marked the first time the IRA used the DShK heavy-machine guns smuggled from Libya against British forces.

== Aftermath ==
The DShKs and their armour-piercing ammunition became the weapon of choice for the South Armagh IRA in later attacks. On 20 October 1989 an IRA team mounted two heavy machine guns on the back of a lorry. This time the target was an unmarked civilian-type, armour-plated Ford Sierra driven by two uncovered RUC constables from Bessbrook Mills to Belleeks, which was riddled with more than 70 rounds and exploded in flames. One of the constables was killed, while the other had a narrow escape. The machine guns are thought to be the same employed in the shooting down of Lynx XZ664.

By June 1989, Secretary of State for Northern Ireland Tom King admitted that a number of counter-measures had been taken by the Ministry of Defence (MoD) to deal with the increasing threat of the IRA's use of heavy machine-guns. Kevlar panels were fitted to the helicopters bellies, and the rotorcraft were ordered to fly in pairs over border areas to assure mutual assistance. Army Air Corps pilots carried MP5 machine pistols after the incident.

In spite of these security steps, sources reported a number of heavy machine-guns attacks against helicopters on the following years, in South Armagh and elsewhere. A Gazelle (serial number ZB687) was shot down by members of the Provisional IRA East Tyrone Brigade on 11 February 1990 between Augher and Derrygorry. On 13 February 1991, Lynx ZE380 was heavily damaged and brought down near Crossmaglen by an IRA unit using one DShK heavy machine gun and two GPMG machine guns. The crew were rescued unscathed by another helicopter. On 15 March 1992, an IRA unit fired more than 1,000 machine gun rounds at two Lynx helicopters from across the border near Rosslea, County Fermanagh. A protracted shoot-out between Lynx helicopters and armed IRA trucks, all of them mounting DShKs, occurred along Newry Road, east of Crossmaglen, on 23 September 1993. On 12 December 1993, after a successful ambush on an RUC patrol in Fivemiletown, an East Tyrone Brigade unit made good its escape by firing at a Lynx helicopter involved in a follow-up operation.

Lynx XZ664 returned to service, but suffered a failure of the tail-rotor while flying near RAF Leeming in February 2001 and rolled over; this time the machine sustained enough damage to be written off.

== See also ==
- Chronology of Provisional Irish Republican Army actions (1980–89)
- 1991 British Army Lynx shootdown
- List of attacks on British aircraft during The Troubles
