= Battle of Newry Road =

1993 IRA attack in Northern Ireland

- Part of the Troubles and Operation Banner
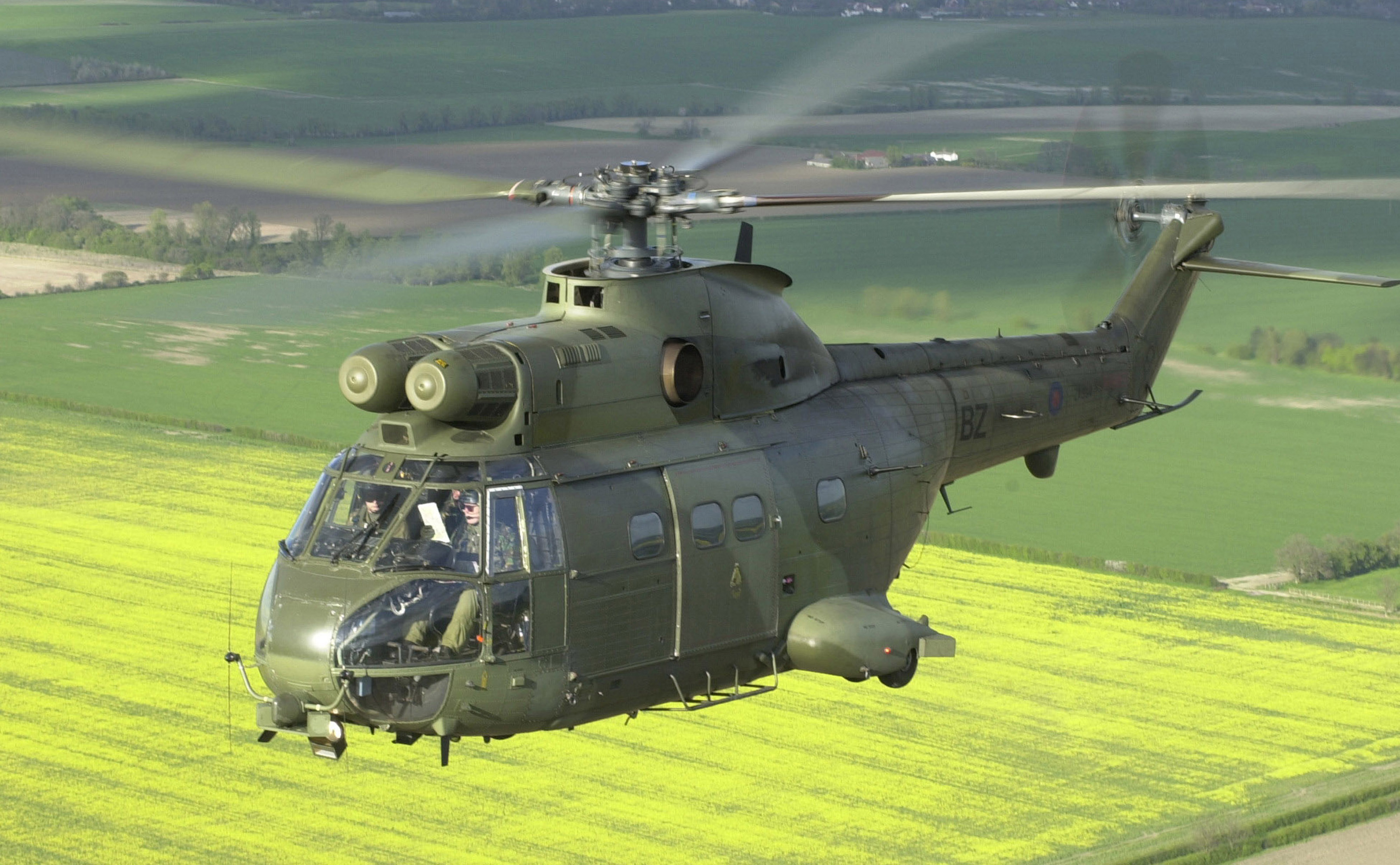
- RAF Puma helicopter
Date	23 September 1993
Location	East of Crossmaglen, County Armagh 54°5′5″N 6°35′28″W
Result	Inconclusive

Belligerents
Provisional IRA; • South Armagh Brigade	United Kingdom; • British Army

Strength
5 Improvised tactical vehicles	5 helicopters; 16 soldiers

Casualties and losses
1 heavy machine gun; 2 light machine guns; 1 assault rifle	2 helicopters damaged
- Location within Northern Ireland

The Battle of Newry Road was a running gun battle between British Army helicopters and Provisional Irish Republican Army (IRA) armed trucks, fought along the lanes east of Crossmaglen, County Armagh, on 23 September 1993. The engagement began when an IRA motorized team from the South Armagh Brigade attempted to ambush three helicopters lifting off from the British Army base at Crossmaglen, one of them carrying the 3rd Infantry Brigade Commander.

== Previous actions (1974–1993) ==
According to British Army reports, the IRA carried out 23 attacks on helicopters in south County Armagh during the Troubles. Until the early 1990s, when the Westland Lynx were fitted with heavy machine guns, all British helicopters in Northern Ireland flew unarmed.

Following two attacks with rifles and a rocket-propelled grenade (RPG) in 1974 and 1976, the introduction by the South Armagh Brigade of M60 machine guns increased its firepower. In February 1978, in the follow-up of a shooting between British troops and IRA members, a Gazelle helicopter crashed when its pilot attempted to avoid machine-gun fire, killing a Royal Green Jackets Lieutenant Colonel on board, Ian Corden-Lloyd. A year later, a Scout helicopter was hit nine times while flying over Glassdrumman. A Grenadier Guards Major was wounded, but the pilot managed to land the machine safely.

One Gazelle was damaged in January 1980 and another in May 1981, both near the village of Cullaville. In another incident, an RAF Wessex was hit nine times over Croslieve mountain, west of Forkhill, in 1982, by rounds fired from an M60 and a .50 Browning machine gun, allegedly recovered by the IRA from an Allied aircraft that crashed on Lough Neagh during World War II. The same weapons were fired at the same Wessex (serial number XR506) flying over Aughanduff Mountain in May 1983. This time, the machine was hit by 23 rounds and received severe damage.

The Libyan shipments of weapons for the IRA in the mid-1980s included 18 DShKs 12.7 mm machine guns, which further enhanced the anti-aircraft capabilities of the South Armagh Brigade. These weapons were used for the first time against a British Army helicopter in June 1988, when an Army Air Corps Lynx was hit by 15 rounds and brought down by an IRA unit near Cashel Lough Upper.

Another incident occurred on 20 February 1990, when an IRA team composed of at least 20 volunteers attempted to attack a helicopter at Newtownhamilton, but their efforts were thwarted when a van, a car, and several masked men manning a light machine gun were spotted by an RAF Wessex on a reconnaissance mission. After a hot pursuit in which some vehicles and some IRA volunteers escaped, three of the men were tracked to Silverbridge, where the Wessex landed three soldiers and two Royal Ulster Constabulary constables. The men were arrested, but the security patrol was suddenly overwhelmed by a stone-throwing crowd of 40 residents, who forcibly released the suspects. One of the men arrested was Jim Martin, who had recently been part of a scheme to smuggle surface-to-air missiles from the United States. He was still at large and living in the area at the time of the signing of the Good Friday Agreement. In later searches in the area, security forces recovered two AK-47 and a Heckler & Koch rifle and two light machine guns. The AK-47s had been used in the 1989 Jonesborough ambush, and the killing of Chief Superintendent Harry Breen and Superintendent Bob Buchanan in 1989.

On 13 February 1991 a Lynx helicopter was severely damaged and brought down near Crossmaglen by an IRA unit using a heavy machine gun and two GPMG machine guns. The machine was hit by eight DShK rounds and two GPMG rounds, and eventually crash-landed near Silverbridge. The crew were rescued unhurt by a second Lynx.

On 11 June 1993, the South Armagh Brigade attempted to shoot down a Puma helicopter taking off from the Crossmaglen base with an improvised mortar. The barrack buster, fired from the back of a local baker's delivery van, exploded on the helipad shortly after the pilot had managed to take off. Two Lynx helicopters escorting the Puma failed to prevent the attack. The IRA action was carried out to coincide with a one-day visit to Northern Ireland by Queen Elizabeth.

== The battle ==
On 23 September 1993, approximately at 2:00 pm, members of the IRA's South Armagh Brigade deployed five armed trucks in different positions around the Crossmaglen barracks. The targets were a troop-carrying RAF Puma helicopter lifting off from Crossmaglen's helipad and its escort of two British Army Lynx. On board the Puma was the 3rd Infantry Brigade Commander, who was paying a visit to different bases in a farewell trip to the soldiers at the end of their operational tour. Author Toby Harnden states that the IRA used two DShK heavy machine guns and three light machine guns and opened fire from near St. Patrick's Church and the community centre. Staff Sergeant Shaun Wyatt, commander of one of the two Lynx initially under attack, identified two firing positions, one of them from a 4x4 vehicle. The IRA version is that they fired from a wooded area, and that their firepower became diminished when a number of weapons jammed. They claimed that the helicopters were in the process of landing when the shooting began. The IRA report also lists RPGs among the weapons used in this action.

The Puma was hit by a heavy 12.7 mm round almost immediately and climbed away, while the two escorts, Lynx 1 and Lynx 2, were also targeted from another firing point. Two other escorts, Lynx 5 and Lynx 7, came to support their colleagues. Lynx 2 avoided being hit by heading to the north at low level. Some sources claim that the Puma was hit several times. The IRA acknowledge that the helicopters manoeuvred away from the stream of bullets directed at them and that they were joined by the other two helicopters. Two of the trucks headed east along Newry Road and a 12-mile chase ensued, amid a fierce exchange of gunfire; one of the helicopters was hit and forced to disengage, according to republican sources. Harnden says that, besides the Puma, one of the Lynx was also damaged in the action.

The British helicopters initially spotted two trucks and one supporting car, but they lost track of the smaller vehicle, while one of the trucks turned off into a farmyard. Lynx 2 rejoined the battle by engaging the retreating trucks from the south. The aircraft tried to fire upon the truck's convoy twice, but the machine gun jammed in the first occasion and another Lynx crossed the line of fire in the second. The IRA claim that the helicopters fired 'indiscriminately' against civilian property and cars with 'rockets and machine gun fire'. The remainder lorry stopped in the main street of a village near Crossmaglen, and a number of men transferred weapons to a Transit van. At this point Lynx 1, which had come back to base to muster troops, landed eight soldiers from the 1st Battalion, Duke of Edinburgh's Royal Regiment, who engaged the van with small arms fire. Three masked men got out unscathed from the vehicle and hid in a bungalow. They later slipped away in another car, but the soldiers were powerless to intervene since the individuals were not carrying weapons and the officer in charge of the operation was not sure whether the men were the same ones who had driven the van. Other troops were delivered by Lynx 2 near the farm where the other truck had been concealed, only to find that the vehicle and its occupants had vanished.

The helicopters fired 200 rounds, while the IRA report put the number of rounds spent in the whole engagement in the thousands. The action lasted for 10 to 30 minutes, and was assessed by the British Army as the most intense gun battle ever in South Armagh. The authorities recovered a DShK, two light machine guns and an AK-47. There were no casualties on either side, and all the IRA volunteers got away.

== Aftermath ==
According to author Nick Van Der Bijl, the Gardaí found two IRA trucks on the southern side of the border. Six months later, on 20 March and 12 July 1994, the IRA in South Armagh managed to shoot down one British Army Lynx and one RAF Puma with home-made mortars.

After the incident, the British Army improved armour protection for their helicopter crews in Northern Ireland, as well as the machine gun mountings and sightings. There were plans to purchase a Skyship 600 Airship in the role of flying command post to improve co-ordination from a safe height. Within days of the gunbattle, Royal Navy Sea King helicopters were deployed to the west of the country to release Army Air Corps and RAF helicopters to boost South Armagh's effort. On 26 April 1994, Staff Sergeant Shaun Wyatt, commander of Lynx 2, was awarded the Distinguished Flying Cross (DFC) for his deeds during the battle. The medal won by Staff Sergeant Wyatt was sold at Bosleys auction house for more than £100,000 in June 2011.

== See also ==
- Chronology of Provisional Irish Republican Army actions (1990–1999)
- List of attacks on British aircraft during The Troubles
- 1991 British Army Lynx shootdown
- 1993 Fivemiletown ambush
- Improvised tactical vehicles of the Provisional IRA
