= Improvised tactical vehicles of the Provisional IRA =

List of armed vehicles used by the Provisional IRA

A tractor mounting an IRA improvised mobile mortar launcher welded to the rear forks after an attack on the British Army barracks at Crossmaglen, 4 February 1993

Throughout the protracted conflict in Northern Ireland (1960s-1998), the Provisional IRA developed a series of improvised mortars to attack British Army and Royal Ulster Constabulary (RUC) security bases. The organisation also purchased both light and heavy machine guns in order to hamper the British Army supply of border bases by helicopter. The IRA fitted vehicles, specially vans and trucks, with both types of weapons. Vans, trucks and tractors were modified to transport concealed improvised mortars to a launch area near the intended target and fire them, while light and heavy trucks were employed as firing platforms mounting machine guns, particularly M60s and DShKs. Improvised armoured vehicles and heavy equipment were also used to penetrate the perimeter of fortified security bases. The IRA vehicles were often disguised as belonging to civilian companies or even government agencies.

== Technicals ==
Both pick-up and heavy flatbed trucks mounting automatic weapons, known in military jargon as technicals or non-standard tactical vehicles (NSTV), were involved in a number of machine gun attacks on helicopters and security bases in Northern Ireland. The IRA called them "mobile gun platforms". The South Armagh Brigade made of these armed trucks their weapon of choice.

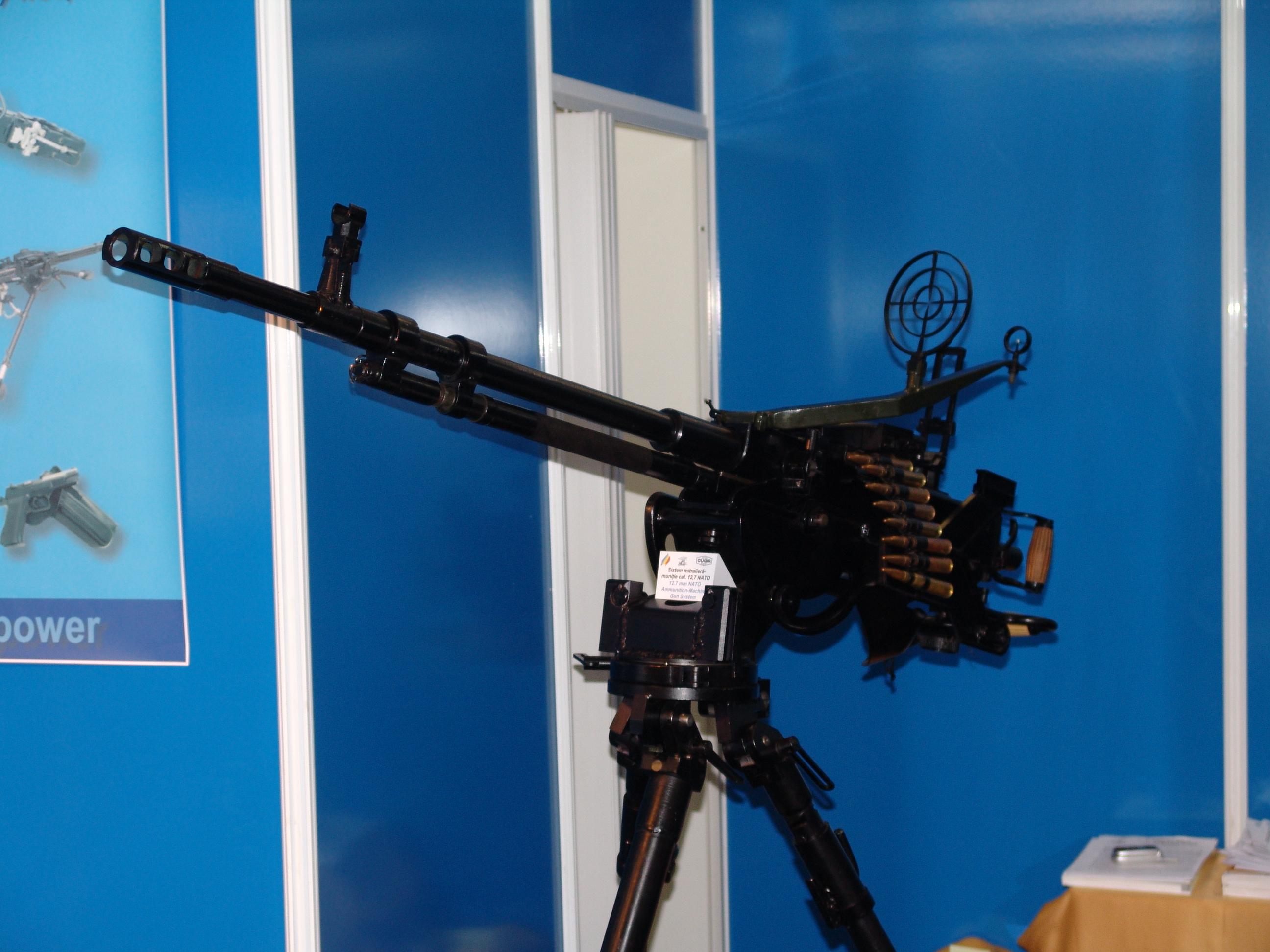
DShK heavy machine gun

On 25 September 1990, a pick-up truck mounting two light machine guns and one heavy DShK machine gun engaged an Army Air Corps Lynx helicopter approaching Crossmaglen barracks on a resupply mission. The helicopter flew back to its base, but one soldier on the ground was wounded. Another pick-up became the mobile platform for a heavy machine gun attack on a Royal Air Force (RAF) Wessex carrying troops in Forkhill, on 31 January 1991. An 89-round stream was fired at the helicopter, which was hit by a single bullet.

On 2 March 1991 it was the turn of another Lynx to come under fire over Crossmaglen from a machine gun mounted on the back of a pick-up truck in an improvised armoured turret, supported by IRA volunteers with automatic rifles. There was no immediate reaction from British security forces although the joint RUC/Army base was just 50 yards away. The shooting was filmed by an RTÉ television crew who happened to be outside Crossmaglen's Health Centre. A September 1993 attack on a Puma helicopter ferrying the British Army's 3rd Brigade commander, which resulted in a running gun battle between armed flatbed trucks and Lynx helicopters, known as the Battle of Newry Road, saw the South Armagh IRA employing at least one armed 4x4 pick-up truck in the shooting and one van in the getaway operation.

Vans' boxes were likewise adapted to mount concealed heavy machine guns and automatic weapons to engage personnel, other vehicles and security compounds. On 21 December 1978, a South Armagh Brigade van carrying an M60 machine gun protected with sandbags, an armour plate, and supported by other armed militants on foot, fired on a British Army patrol in Crossmaglen, killing three soldiers. A Toyota Hiace was used to ambush an RUC mobile patrol on Ballymoyer Road, between Whitecross and Newtownhamilton, on 31 October 1983. Three RUC constables were wounded in the shooting. On 11 March 1994 an Isuzu van hijacked in Ballyshannon, County Donegal, was equipped with improvised armour plates and sandbag protection and armed with two heavy machine guns. Nine civilians were held hostage in the owner's house. The improvised fighting vehicle crossed the border at lunchtime and made an incursion into Belleek, County Fermanagh, to engage British troops, but had to withdraw after failing to find its target. A couple of months later, on 27 May 1994, a Ford Transit van fitted in the same way with automatic weapons and driven by five members of the East Tyrone Brigade launched a late night raid on a British Army permanent checkpoint manned by eight soldiers at Aughnacloy, opening up harassing fire on the military facilities. The soldiers returned fire. The improvised tactical vehicle eventually fled to the border.

Vans were also used to transport heavily armed IRA members to the site of a planned action, like in the occasion of the Loughgall ambush, on 8 May 1987, where eight IRA volunteers were killed by the Special Air Service (SAS) while on board a blue Toyota Hiace, or in the assassination of Shankill Butchers' leader Lennie Murphy on 16 November 1982, when the killers emerged from the back doors of a Morris Marina they managed to drive to the Belfast Protestant area of Glencairn. Vans were involved in two other SAS ambushes, both of them in 1984. On 18 October, an SAS team attempted to stop a van carrying IRA members they were checking near Dungannon with unmarked cars; the vehicle sneaked out from the roadblock. In the subsequent shoot-out, a bystander was hit by a stray SAS bullet and killed. A hot pursuit followed, but the IRA unit got away. Two months later, on 1 December, two unmarked civilian-type cars surrounded a stationary van with IRA members on the process of planting a bomb. The IRA unit realised they were caught and opened fire on one of the SAS teams, killing one soldier. The IRA men attempted to run away through a field on foot, but one of them was shot and killed while still on the vehicle. Another drowned in a nearby river and other two made good their escape. A press report suggests that the East Tyrone Brigade shot down a British Army Gazelle near Clogher on 11 January 1990 using heavy machine guns transported on vehicles, which were spotted by the helicopter just minutes before the attack. On 10 June 1997, just weeks before the final Provisional IRA ceasefire, an undercover British Army unit on a parked van received small arms fire from IRA volunteers from the Derry Brigade riding on another van on Foyle Road in Derry. No injuries were reported.

In 1993 the IRA examined attacking the headquarters of the loyalist paramilitary Ulster Defence Association (UDA) on the Shankill Road with a DShK heavy machine gun mounted to a lorry, raking the building with 12.7mm rounds during a meeting of the organisation's leadership. The odds of the IRA members involved being killed or captured by British security forces while escaping the scene was deemed too high and instead the IRA attempted a bomb attack which ended in disaster for the organisation.

== Improvised armoured vehicles ==
Improvised armoured vehicles were also occasionally produced by the IRA. On 13 December 1989, an IRA flying column used an improvised armoured truck to storm a British Army checkpoint at Derryard, County Fermanagh, manned by members of the King's Own Scottish Borderers (KOSB). The vehicle, a Bedford TL, armoured with reinforced sides, metal plates protecting the flatbed, sandbags and a crash bar, and mounting two heavy DShK machine guns and an LPO-50 flamethrower, was also transformed to transport a dozen men armed with AK-47 rifles, hand grenades and RPGs. The armoured vehicle smashed backwards through the gates of the compound, allowing the IRA volunteers to dismount and break inside the base, supported by the weapons of the improvised armoured carrier. Two British soldiers were killed in action. In spite of the fierce exchange of fire, the British Army did not claim officially any hits, though at least five shots seems to have struck the truck's rear. A van bomb left by the assailants at the checkpoint only exploded partially. Despite a counter-attack by a patrol of the KOSB assisted by an RAF Wessex, the heavy vehicle fled to the border, where it was disarmed, booby-trapped and abandoned by its crew. The unarmed helicopter received fire from the armoured truck and was forced to disengage. The British troops in Northern Ireland were equipped with Luchaire 40 mm anti-tank grenades after the assault.

In July 1991, the IRA planned a similar attack on a vehicular checkpoint, this time by delivering a 1,000 lb (450 kg) bomb in the trailer of an articulated lorry. The cab unit had been cladded in improvised armour and the hydraulics had been modified to allow the driver to quickly disengage the trailer and activate a short timer for the bomb. The plan, to tow the bomb into a border checkpoint and abandon the payload before driving away, was foiled when the Gardaí confiscated the vehicle in Lifford, County Donegal.

At least one car, a Mazda 626 wagon, used as a mobile platform for snipers in South Armagh in sixteen occasions from 1992 to 1997, was fitted with a metal plate to protect the shooter, hidden in the modified trunk, from return fire. Author Toby Harnden listed another sniper vehicles like vans and jeeps armoured in the same guise. British soldiers fired back on at least two occasions, both of them without consequences. British soldiers fired on the sniper on 17 March 1993 in the environs of Forkhill, after a successful attack in which a Royal Scots soldier was killed. The other engagement took place at a British army mobile checkpoint near Newtownhamilton, on 31 July 1993.

Mounting turrets were built in several cases on technicals to shelter DShk heavy machine guns and their operators. In other incidents involving armed vans, the gunners were protected with sandbags and armour plates.

Heavy equipment was sometimes employed by the IRA as improvised assault vehicles to tear down fences, walls and even observation posts. In 1972, a British Army watchtower at a timber yard in Belfast was torn apart by the bucket of an IRA excavator. There was no reaction and no casualties among the British troops. On 11 July 1972 there was another attempt to destroy a military outpost with a bulldozer at Lenadoon, Belfast, during the Battle of Lenadoon. The machine carried a bomb in its bucket. An IRA volunteer crashed the heavy tracked vehicle into the observation post supported by small arms fire, but the device failed to explode properly.

The most notable use of these vehicles was between 1986 and 1987 by the Lynagh unit of the East Tyrone Brigade, when diggers broke through the perimeter fences of the RUC barracks at The Birches and Loughgall, driven by IRA volunteer Declan Arthurs, who had experience in handling excavators in his family farm since his teen years. The machines carried huge bombs on their buckets in both occasions, and although the security bases were devastated by the explosions, the IRA unit was immediately ambushed and wiped out after the attack in Loughgall; eight of its members, among them Lynagh and Arthurs, were shot and killed by an SAS team.

The South Armagh Brigade build up their attack on the Cloghoge checkpoint in May 1992 by lifting a Renault Master van converted into an improvised locomotive from the road to the railway with a stolen JCB tracked digger. The heavy machine was previously used to smash through the railway stone wall and pile up stones and wooden planks to construct a ramp to line up the van bomb with the rail tracks.

Some days later, on 7 May 1992, according to an IRA report, the South Fermanagh Brigade used a tractor in County Tyrone to plant a bomb beside an unprotected wall of the RUC base at Fivemiletown. The tractor was driven through a hedge and a garden before delivering the 1,000 pounds (450 kg) explosive device. The base was heavily damaged by the huge blast, as well as surrounding residential areas. Ten civilians were injured. A British Army sergeant was killed by one of his company's soldiers while providing a security detail in the aftermath of the attack, in a blue-to-blue incident.

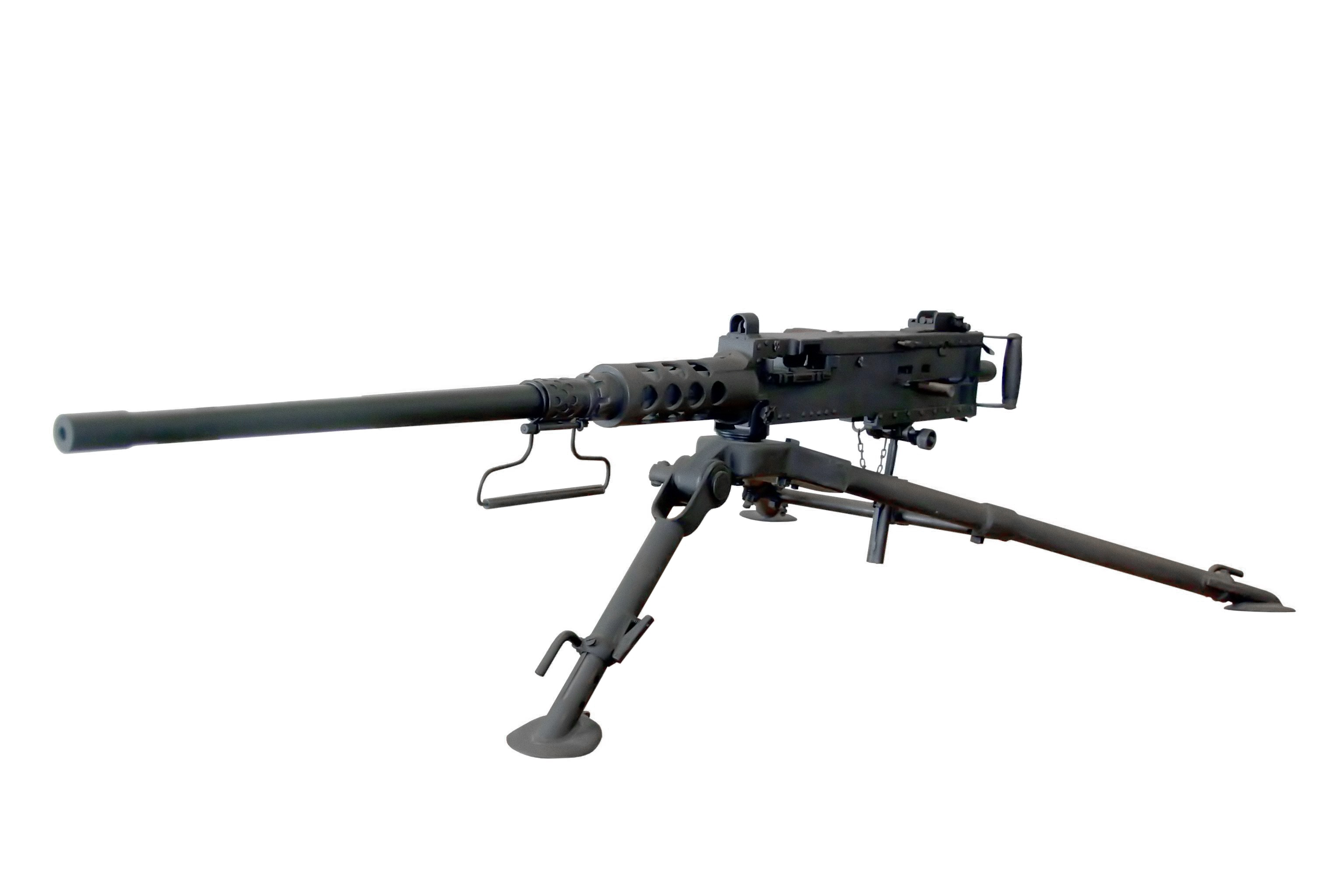
M2 Browning

Armed heavy trucks were used to attack security bases as well. On 6 June 1979, the IRA launched an assault using a hijacked tipper lorry on the headquarters of the 10th Battalion of the Ulster Defence Regiment (UDR) in the Malone area of Belfast. The lorry halted at the perimeter fence of the base and IRA members in the rear lobbed an explosive device before spraying a portacabin with automatic fire. They also fired upon the company office. Three soldiers were injured and Private Alexander Gore was rendered unconscious, later succumbing to his injuries. Another grenade had been thrown but failed to detonate and was later defused by the British Army. An off-duty RUC officer fired two shots at the vehicle as it escaped seemingly to no effect, and the IRA team also fired at RUC officers at the Tate's Avenue bridge, who were forced to abandon their patrol car and take cover. The lorry was later found abandoned in the Andersonstown area of Belfast. On 24 May 1985, a truck with two .50 Browning machine gun mounted on its back hit an RAF Wessex over Crossmaglen barracks. At the least one of the .50 Browning machine guns was allegedly recovered by the IRA from an Allied aircraft that crashed on Lough Neagh during World War II. The helicopter was struck three times, The engagement ended with an exchange of fire between a military sentry in the base and the armed truck as it was driven away towards the border. A rocket and gun attack was carried out from a dump truck on an RUC outpost at Waterloo Park on 30 November 1990, in Belfast, where two constables were wounded, and the ill-fated shooting on Coalisland security base by two East Tyrone Brigade units, one of them decimated in a Special Air Service (SAS) ambush during the getaway, involved a truck mounting a 12.7mm machine gun. Flatbed trucks mounting machine guns were the main players in the above mentioned running firefight known as the Battle of Newry Road, one of the longest shoot outs between the IRA and British helicopters that took place on 23 September 1993 in South Armagh.

Armed heavy trucks also engaged security forces' vehicles. On 20 October 1989 heavy machine gun fire from a flatbed truck destroyed an armour-plated Ford Sierra with two RUC undercover constables on board, between Bessbrook and Belleeks, in South Armagh. One constable was killed as the Sierra blew out in flames. A similar incident occurred on 15 July 1994, when the East Tyrone Brigade set up an ambush on the Dungannon-Ballygawley road at Killeeshil crossroads using a heavy dump truck carrying a number of volunteers armed with automatic weapons. The plan was to attack an RUC mobile patrol travelling through the main road, based upon intelligence collected by another unit checking the patrols' movements west of Dungannon. At midday, an RUC armour-plated Vauxhall Cavallier was spotted coming from the west. The truck overtook the civilian-type patrol vehicle, which was riddled with gunfire. Incidentally, Clones' Sinn Féin councillor Pat Treanor was under custody in the rear of the car.

The RUC had arrested him some hours before in Fermanagh, while showing cross-border roads closed by the British Army to two Swedish journalists. The armour plated Cavallier received hits on its roof and sides. Three constables were wounded, one of them seriously. One of the constables returned fire, but scored no hits. Pat Treanor received an injury on his hand. A female motorist riding on a passing-by car was also injured when her vehicle was hit by the RUC patrol car. The truck was driven away by the IRA unit through the lanes off the main road and abandoned before the arrival of the British Army to the scene.

== Mobile mortar launchers ==
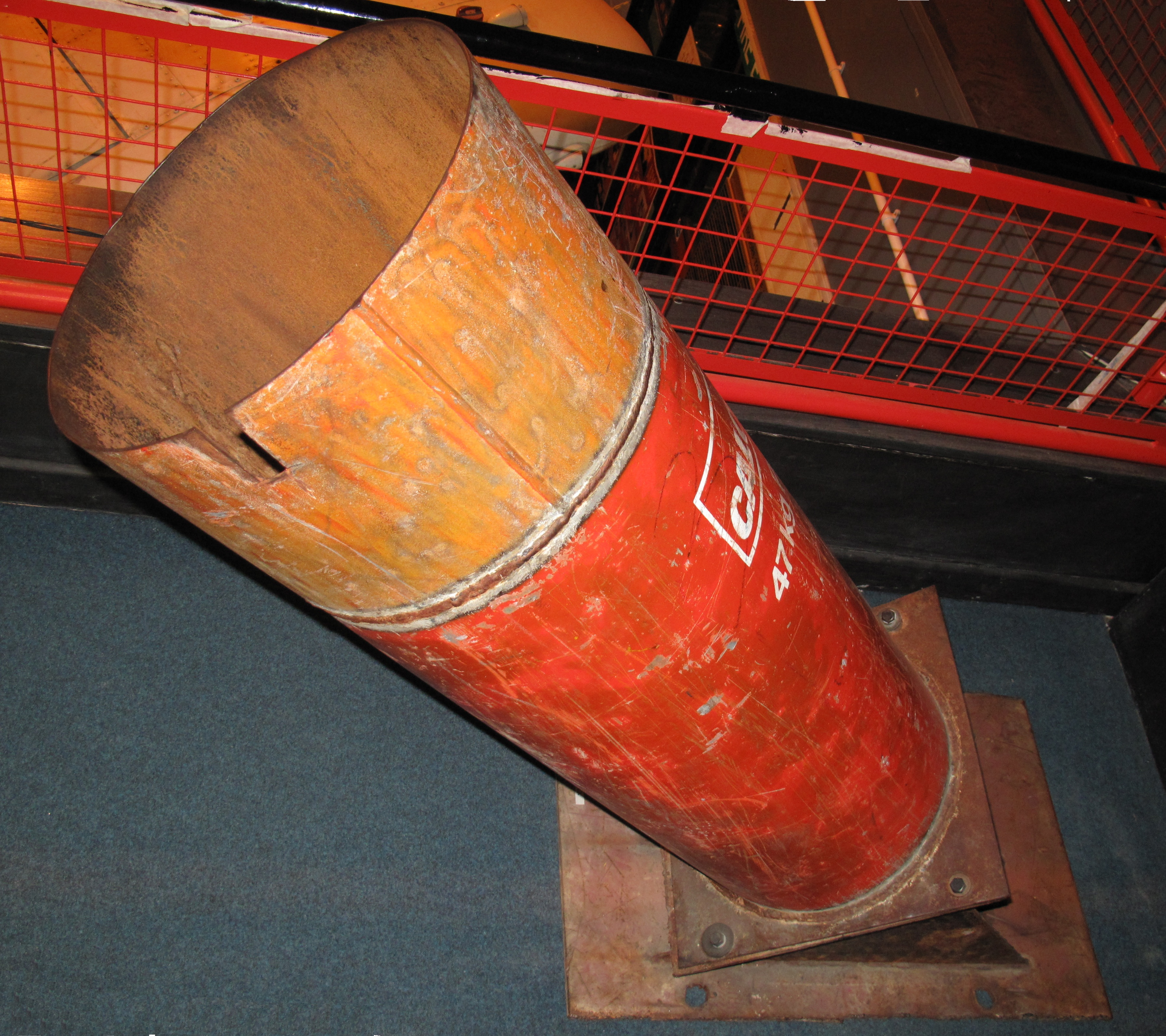
IRA barrack-buster mortar.

In a report on a June 1994 Mark-15 single mortar attack on the RUC/Army barracks at Pomeroy by the East Tyrone Brigade, the IRA described a modified Range Rover driven from Turnabarson townland through an area heavily patrolled by the RUC and the British Army to carry out the operation as a "mobile mortar launcher". The Mark-15 or "barrack buster" was the heaviest mortar developed by the Provisional IRA. Transit vans were more commonly employed to fire light mortars like the Mark-6 or Mark-10. A number of tubes were strapped together and welded to the floor of the back of the van. A panel of the van's roof was cut away and covered over as a "hatch" to be open when the mortar bombs were launched. These improvised launchers were used in some "spectacular" incidents in Britain, such as the mortar attack on Downing street in February 1991 and the first attack on Heathrow airport in March 1994. On 28 June 1996 three Mark-15 mortar bombs were launched from the trailer of an open Ford Transit van on Quebec Barracks at Osnabrück Garrison near Osnabrück, Germany, causing severe damage. Another variant of the mobile mortar launcher, described in an April 1994 RUC statement, was the "drive-by" launcher. A short-range Mark-15 mortar, fairly heavier than usual, was adapted to be fired from a moving van while passing by the intended target, instead of being launched by timer from a stationary vehicle, as was habitual. The East Tyrone Brigade gave details of this tactics when reporting a mortar attack from a travelling van on the RUC barracks at Beragh, on 21 February 1994. The base suffered "major structural damage". The van, a yellow Austin Maestro, had been bought by an IRA volunteer to a mechanic from Merchantstown Road, Omagh. A Suzuki jeep was fitted with a barrack buster by the South Armagh Brigade to attack the RUC barracks at Bessbrook on 1 March 1993, causing widespread damage. A 260 pounds (120 kg) version of the Mark-15 was launched from another jeep on 29 March 1994 at the local RUC barracks in Newtownbutler, County Fermanagh. The South Fermanagh Brigade claimed responsibility. The device failed to explode and was eventually defused. Some months later, on 3 August 1994, another jeep was used by the IRA in South Armagh to launch a barrack buster at Newtownhamilton barracks, where three British soldiers were wounded.

The Mark-15 was carried to the firing point on a trailer or a hydraulic hoist pulled by a tractor in several attacks. The mortar was usually concealed in straw bales. Sometimes the mortar was welded on the tractor's rear forks, like in the shooting down of a Lynx helicopter over Crossmaglen barracks on 19 March 1994 by the South Armagh Brigade. Some weeks later, on 9 April 1994 at midday, a barrack-buster mortar was transported and fired by a tractor once again, this time on the British Army border checkpoint at Aughnacloy, County Tyrone. The heavy projectile landed without exploding at the rear of the base, near Coronation Park housing estate, forcing its evacuation. According to other sources, the device actually exploded but caused little damage. The East Tyrone Brigade report on the attack says that they took over the area between the checkpoint and the border, set a roadblock, selected a firing point some 400 yards from the target, drove the tractor in and issued a 30-minute warning. On 12 July 1994, a second helicopter, an RAF Puma carrying troops was hit and forced to crash-land on a football pitch at Newtownhamilton by the explosion of another tractor-launched Mark-15. A truck was used instead as firing platform in a deadly Mark-15 attack on Keady RUC/Army barracks in South Armagh on 8 March 1993, when a civilian contractor to the British Army was killed and several other personnel wounded. A cattle truck, which the IRA classify as a "mobile multiple mortar launcher", was equipped to carry ten mortar tubes arranged in staggered rows on its back. The IRA's South Down Brigade used the heavy vehicle to fire ten mortar rounds at the British Army Barracks near Kilkeel, County Down. The mortars are described as Mark-15 by author Roger Davies.

The IRA also employed trucks as mobile mortar launchers for Mark-10 mortars, as in the attack carried out on an RAF Wessex on 22 June 1983 over Crossmaglen. The helicopter flew away after jettisoning its cargo, and the base suffered some damage. One soldier was wounded. Vans also acted like firing platforms against helicopters. as showed on the shelling of Crossmaglen base helipad on 11 June 1993 with a Mark-15 mortar, just seconds after an RAF Puma take off. The vehicle was painted in the colours and displayed the logo of a local baker's delivery. A Ford D truck with nine mortar tubes bolted on sneaked its way from Crossmaglen through the streets of Newry to the firing point on the early evening of 28 February 1985. A single Mark-10 mortar bomb hit a portcabin in the local RUC base, killing nine constables, in what became the deadliest mortar shelling during the conflict. On 29 July 1994, two mortars launched from another truck hit the security complex in Newry again, this time wounding three soldiers, three RUC constables and 38 civilians.

The IRA reported that in at least two occasions, the Derry Brigade used different vehicles as vectors to launch horizontal mortar attacks. On 5 May 1992, a van, modified to mount a Mark-12 mortar on the cab, was driven right up to the observation post at Rousemount barracks. The mortar bomb caused structural damage to the base, and blast damage to eight houses in Creggan Road. Two soldiers and a civilian were wounded. One year later, the brigade adapted a Ford Sierra's roof rack to carry on a horizontal mortar launcher on a military vehicle. On 20 October 1993, around Fort George British Army barracks, on the west bank of the river Foyle in Derry, the mobile launcher was driven to the firing point, from where a passing heavy armoured vehicle was ambushed. The IRA claimed that the round struck home, and several RUC constables received injuries. According to IRA sources, a previous East Tyrone Brigade "directional horizontal mortar" attack on an RUC armoured patrol car, to be carried out from an undisclosed type of vehicle, was abandoned when the device failed to activate in Omagh, on 11 July 1992. A more conventional attack on the RUC barracks at Grosvenor Road, Belfast, involved an IRA volunteer firing a rocket launcher from the open sunroof of a Lada Samara on 28 June 1994.

By 1991, posters warning troops and civilians of the threat of IRA improvised mobile mortar launchers were hanged on the walls of military facilities in Northern Ireland and across the United Kingdom.

== Directional car and railway bombs ==
In addition to the conventional, stationary car bombs and their widely condemned variant, the proxy bomb, the IRA improvised unmanned and remote controlled vehicles to deliver large explosive devices on specific targets, On 3 September 1991, an IRA unit, after hijacking a number of tractors to block roads and taking hostages, forced one of them to drive a tractor carrying a trailer with a 3,600 kilograms (7,900 lb) bomb towards a hill overlooking a British Army checkpoint near Rosslea, County Fermanagh, and then let the vehicle to roll down toward the facilities. The attack failed when the tractor overturned not far from its target due to the explosive device weight. Another botched IRA bomb attack, this time using a remotely operated tractor occurred on 4 August 1993, when the vehicle, which also carried a dummy driver made of straw, swerved out of the road on its way to a British Army checkpoint in South Armagh. The IRA had carried out a similar attack in South Armagh on 3 May 1989, when a tractor with a dummy driver towing a 900 kilograms (2,000 lb) bomb in a trailer was left running with its throttle engaged and pointed in the direction of a British Army observation post at Glassdrummond. The tractor reportedly veered off course and was detonated short of the British Army position. The action was part of a wave of bomb attacks carried out by the IRA in the South Armagh area that week, one of which killed a British soldier, Corporal Stephen McGonigle.

On 31 May 1991, an unmanned Mercedes truck loaded with a 1,100 kilograms (2,400 lb) explosive device was rolled down on a hill's slope aimed at an Ulster Defence Regiment (UDR) base at Glenanne, County Armagh. Three UDR soldiers were killed and the barracks utterly shattered by the explosion. On the first hours of 1 May 1992, with the assistance of a tracked digger, as mentioned above, a 2,200 pounds (1,000 kg) railway bomb was remotely delivered by the South Armagh Brigade through an improvised locomotive, made of a dark-painted Renault Master van fitted with a railway wheelset. The target was a British Army checkpoint besides the Dublin-Belfast railroad at Cloghoge, south of Newry. The explosives were set off by a mile-long wire attached to the bodywork. The base was obliterated. A British soldier was killed in action and 23 others wounded in different degrees as a result.

== Improvised self-propelled flamethrowers ==
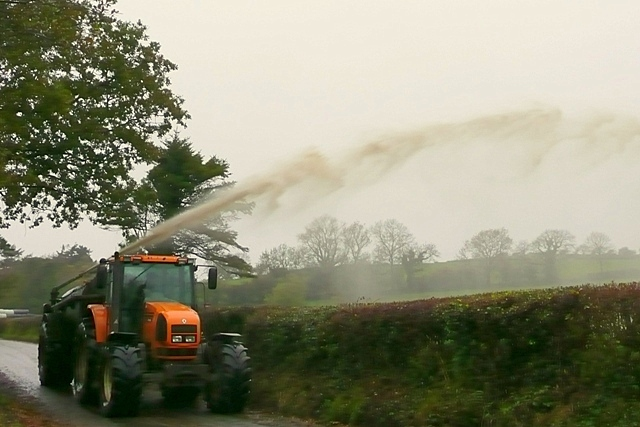
Slurry-spreader tractor, similar to those used by the IRA as improvised flamethrowers to engage fortified positions

On 4 March 1990, a ten-man IRA unit launched an incendiary assault on the RUC station at Stewartstown, County Tyrone, using an improvised flamethrower consisting of a manure-spreader towed by a tractor to spray 600 imperial gallons (2,700 L) of a petrol/diesel mix to set the security base on fire, and supported by rifles and an RPG-7 rocket launcher.

On 12 December 1992 a tractor towing a manure-spreader was once again involved in a similar IRA operation. This time the improvised flamethrower was aimed at Borucki sangar, a fortified British army observation post alongside Crossmaglen town square. The slurry pit pumped fuel oil to the sangar, at the time manned by members of the Scots Guards, and set it on fire. No injuries were reported.

On 12 November 1993 a second improvised flamethrower attack was carried out on the same target, once more time by a tractor dragging a manure spreader, which sprayed the bunker with 1,100 imperial gallons (5,000 L) of petrol. Borucki sangar was then engulfed during seven minutes by a 9 metres (30 ft) tall fireball triggered by a small explosive device. The four Grenadier Guards inside the bunker had to be rescued by a Saxon armoured vehicle.

The improvised flamethrowers employed by the IRA during the Troubles had precedent in the Irish War of Independence. On the early morning of 9 May 1920 a large group of IRA members (reportedly three hundred-strong) launched an attack on the fortified Royal Irish Constabulary (RIC) barracks in Newtownhamilton, County Armagh. The attack opened with a volley of bombs lobbed onto the roof of the barracks followed by intense gunfire. The attackers then bored into the building from an adjoining pub and bombed it with gelignite. The assault lasted four hours and ended when the IRA used potato sprayers to douse the barracks in petrol and paraffin igniting a fire which completely destroyed the building. The RIC officers retreated shortly before it collapsed; there were no reported fatalities during the entire engagement on either side.

== Support teams ==
The improvised tactical vehicles, particularly the mobile mortar launchers, the directional vehicle bombs and the self-propelled flamethrowers, were often escorted by a support car, which would usually lead the armed vehicles to their target, and made sure the IRA unit escaped . Armed IRA volunteers on foot also played a key role in these operations, by taking over and securing the firing area in several mortar, directional bomb, and flamethrower attacks. In some cases, the supporting units set up roadblocks on the approaches to the firing point to secure the zone or opened fire on the target just before the main action.

== See also ==
- Technical (vehicle)
- Improvised vehicle armour
- Gun truck
- South Armagh Brigade
- East Tyrone Brigade
- List of attacks on British aircraft during The Troubles
- Barrack buster
- Provisional IRA arms importation
- List of weapons used by the Provisional Irish Republican Army
