= List of weapons used by the Provisional Irish Republican Army =

The following is a list of weapons used by the Provisional Irish Republican Army (IRA) during the Troubles.

== Sources ==
During the initial phase of the Troubles (1969–1972), the Provisional IRA was poorly equipped and primarily used weapons from World War II. Beginning in the 1970s, the Provisional IRA began importing modern weapons from the United States, Libyan leader Colonel Muammar Gaddafi, and arms dealers in mainland Europe, the Middle East, and elsewhere.

== Firearms ==
=== Handguns ===
Model	Image	Caliber	Type	Origin	Details
Browning Hi-Power		9×19mm Parabellum	Pistol	Belgium	
Luger P08		9×19mm Parabellum	Pistol	German Empire	
Mauser C96		9×25mm Mauser	Pistol	German Empire	
Webley Revolver		.455 Webley	Revolver	United Kingdom	
M1911		.45 ACP	Pistol	United States	Known to be used in some quantities from 1969 to 1998.
Taurus PT92		9×19mm Parabellum	Pistol	Brazil; Libya	Smuggled from Libya.
Glock 17		9×19mm Parabellum	Pistol	Austria	Several smuggled from the US following the IRA's 1994 ceasefire.

=== Rifles ===
Model	Image	Caliber	Type	Origin	Details
Martini–Henry		.577/450 Martini–Henry	Martini falling-block	United Kingdom	In IRA inventory at the outset of The Troubles.
Lee–Enfield		.303 British	Bolt action rifle	United Kingdom	In IRA arsenal from the outset of the Troubles. Continued limited usage by the IRA into the late 1970s. Loaded .303 rifles found by Irish security forces at an IRA training camp in Kilkelly, County Mayo, as late as 1985; Lee-Enfield reportedly still in active use in sniper role in late 1980s.
Gewehr 98		7.92×57mm Mauser	Bolt action rifle	German Empire	
M1 carbine		.30 Carbine	Semi-automatic Carbine	United States	
M1 Garand		.30-06 Springfield	Semi-automatic rifle	United States	Imported to Ireland in large numbers from 1970 onwards. Still in widespread general use in early 1980s.
AR-15		5.56×45mm NATO	Semi-automatic rifle	United States	Smuggled to Ireland by the Harrison Network.
AR-180		5.56×45mm NATO	Semi-automatic rifle	United States	Semi-Automatic variant of the AR-18.
L1A1 Self-Loading Rifle		7.62×51mm NATO	Battle rifle	United Kingdom	Rifles taken from the British Army.
FN FAL		7.62×51mm NATO	Battle rifle	Belgium	
SKS/ Type 56		7.62×39mm	Semi-automatic rifle	Soviet Union; China	Rifles used were of Chinese manufacture and had been originally supplied to the Palestine Liberation Organization.
Remington Model 742		.30-06 Springfield, .308 Winchester	Semi-automatic rifle	United States	Remington Model 742 and various other civilian hunting rifles.
Ruger Mini-14		5.56×45mm NATO	Semi-automatic rifle	United States	
Preetz Model 65		.22 Long Rifle	Semi-automatic rifle	West Germany	Several smuggled from continental Europe in 1974.
Valmet M62/S		7.62×39mm	Semi-automatic rifle	Finland	Example found by British soldier in possession of a woman in the Ardoyne area of Belfast in 1976. Serial number traced rifle to Harrison Network.
Gewehr 43		7.92×57mm Mauser	Semi-automatic rifle	Nazi Germany	Example found by Irish security forces at Buncrana in County Donegal in 1976, serial number traced to Harrison Network. Example also demonstrated at an IRA training camp in 1983.
Beretta BM 59		7.62×51mm NATO	Semi-automatic rifle	Italy	
FN Model 1949		7×57mm Mauser	Semi-automatic rifle	Belgium	Surplus Venezuelan contract rifles.
M14		7.62×51mm NATO	Battle rifle	United States	Smuggled to Ireland by the Harrison Network, seized upon arrival.
M1A		7.62×51mm NATO	Semi-automatic rifle	United States	
Stgw. 57		7.5×55mm Swiss	Battle rifle	Switzerland	Rifle found in IRA safehouse and bomb factory in Liverpool, England in 1975. Example also appeared in IRA arms shipment from the United States in the early 1980s.
Heckler & Koch G3		7.62×51mm NATO	Battle rifle	West Germany	Several traced to batch of 100 stolen from Norwegian Reserve base near Oslo in May 1984. Already reportedly in IRA inventory as early as 1981 and used in attacks.

=== Assault rifles ===
Model	Image	Caliber	Type	Origin	Details
M16		5.56×45mm NATO	Assault rifle	United States	Smuggled to Ireland by the Harrison Network.
AK-47		7.62×39mm	Assault rifle	Soviet Union; Libya	Small numbers reported in IRA inventory by 1976. Several attempts at importing from the Middle East and United States foiled in 1970s. Used in attacks and at training camps from at least 1983. Romanian AKMs provided by Libyan leader Muammar Gaddafi 1985–1986. Libya also supplied AKM rifles of East German manufacture. 1,000 rifles seized by French security forces aboard the Libyan arms freighter Eksund in 1987. IRA believed to still have approximately 650 AK-47/AKM rifles in inventory in 1992.
Vz. 58		7.62×39mm	Assault rifle	Czechoslovak Socialist Republic; Libya	Large haul of vz.58 rifles found in intercepted Libyan arms shipments in 1970s. Vz. 58 reportedly acquired by IRA later and used in incident in which an Irish Army soldier and Garda officer were killed at Derrada Wood, Ballinamore, County Leitrim in December 1983. Six rifles found in a car stopped at permanent British Army checkpoint on the main Dublin-Road in 1988, Libyan connection suspected. Example found in a hidden IRA arms dump in Newry, County Down, in 1989. Weapons described as "Czech versions" of the AK-47/AKM were reportedly part of mid-1980s arms shipments from Libya.
SIG SG 540		5.56×45mm NATO	Assault rifle	Switzerland	Used in Derry in 1984, reportedly taken from an INLA arms cache.
CAR-15 Commando		5.56×45mm NATO	Assault rifle	United States	
FN CAL		5.56×45mm NATO	Assault rifle	Belgium	Used by the South Armagh Brigade from at least 1983. FN CAL rifle used in killing of IPLO member in Newry in 1991 linked to 1985 attacks on British Army helicopters in South Armagh. The IRA reported using "Cal semi-automatic rifles" in an attack in north Antrim in 1985 and in Belfast in 1987.
FN FNC		5.56×45mm NATO	Assault rifle	Belgium	First documented in IRA armoury in early 1985 notably before some regular militaries who had ordered the FNC. Widespread usage with forty examples recovered by British security forces by 1991.
PM md. 63		7.62×39mm	Assault rifle	Romania; Libya	Romanian variant of Russian AK-47 and AKM. Provided by Libyan leader Muammar Gaddafi. AIM models used.
AK-74		5.45×39mm	Assault rifle	Soviet Union; Libya	A 5.45×39mm round was extracted from a British soldier shot in an IRA ambush in August 1992 in County Tyrone. Security sources suspected the IRA had acquired AK-74 rifles in the former Soviet bloc, or it was part of an earlier Libyan shipment.
AN-94		5.45×39mm	Assault rifle	Russia	Reportedly, the IRA purchased at least 20 examples in late 2001.

=== Sniper rifles ===
Model	Image	Caliber	Type	Origin	Details
Barrett M82		.50 BMG	Anti-materiel rifle	United States	Used during the South Armagh Sniper campaign.
Barrett M90		.50 BMG	Anti-materiel rifle	United States	Used during the South Armagh Sniper campaign.
Tejas rifle		.50 BMG	Anti-materiel rifle	United States	Bolt-action .50 BMG rifle manufactured by former Barret employee Ron Freshour of Texas. Dubbed the "Tejas rifle" by security forces and media after being seized in Belfast with "Tejas" found engraved on stock.
V-94		12.7×108mm	Anti-materiel rifle	Russia	Intelligence reports suggested the IRA had imported weapons from Estonia following their 1994 ceasefire, including the V-94 12.7mm sniper rifle.
Dragunov		7.62×54mmR	Designated marksman rifle	Soviet Union	1993 newspaper report alleged IRA was in possession of the rifle. Attempt to smuggle Dragunov rifles from the US in late 1990s foiled by the FBI.
Ruger M77		.308 Winchester	Sniper rifle	United States	
FN Model 30-11		7.62×51mm NATO	Sniper rifle	Belgium	Recovered by British security forces from an IRA arms haul in West Belfast in 1992.

=== Submachine guns ===
Model	Image	Caliber	Type	Origin	Details
Thompson		.45 ACP	Submachine Gun	United States	Used from the outset of the Troubles, including some from the IRA in the 1920s and also the later simplified M1 model. Less common by the late 1970s but reportedly still seeing usage in early 1980s.
Sten		9×19mm Parabellum	Submachine Gun	United Kingdom	
M3		.45 ACP	Submachine Gun	United States	Regular and suppressed versions.
MP-40		9×19mm Parabellum	Submachine Gun	Nazi Germany	
Carl Gustaf m/45		9×19mm Parabellum	Submachine Gun	Sweden	Several examples with Swedish Army markings captured from the IRA in Belfast in the early 1970s. Large quantities of ammunition also seized, manufactured in and likely imported from Europe. Reportedly, some weapons also stolen from the Irish Army.
United Defense M42		9×19mm Parabellum	Submachine Gun	United States	Given to the IRA by Greek Cypriot group EOKA.
Sterling		9×19mm Parabellum	Submachine Gun	United Kingdom	
F1		9×19mm Parabellum	Submachine Gun	Australia	Single gun stolen from the Australian Army in Adelaide in 1972. Recovered from safehouse of Belfast IRA commander Brendan Hughes in 1974.
Sa vz. 23		7.62×25mm Tokarev	Submachine gun	Czechoslovak Socialist Republic	
Vigneron		9×19mm Parabellum	Submachine gun	Belgium	
Uzi		9×19mm Parabellum	Submachine Gun	Israel	
MAC-10		.45 ACP	Submachine Gun	United States	Seized from the Harrison Network by the FBI in 1981.
Beretta M12		9×19mm Parabellum	Submachine Gun	Italy	
Škorpion vz. 61		.32 ACP	Submachine Gun	Czechoslovak Socialist Republic; Libya	Several seized aboard the Libyan arms freighter Eksund in 1987, reportedly fitted with silencers. Separately, examples confiscated from the INLA and IPLO in late 1980s and early 1990s.

=== Machine guns ===
Model	Image	Caliber	Type	Origin	Details
Vickers machine gun		.303 British	Medium machine gun	United Kingdom	Stolen along with other firearms (including Bren guns) during raid on Fórsa Cosanta Áitiúil (FCA) barracks in Midleton, County Cork, in February 1970.
Lewis gun		.303 British	Light machine gun	United Kingdom	One used intensively by the IRA in the Ballymurphy area of Belfast in 1972, captured by British Army in February 1977. Another Lewis gun was found in an IRA arms dump outside Kildare in January 1990.
Besa machine gun		7.92×57mm Mauser	Medium machine gun	United Kingdom	Four Besa machine guns found in IRA arms dump outside Kildare in January 1990.
Bren gun		.303 British	Light machine gun	United Kingdom	Widespread usage in 1970s. Still in IRA arsenal as of 2005, according to IICD chairman General John de Chastelain.
M1919 Browning		.30-06 Springfield	Medium machine gun	United States	
FN FALO		7.62×51mm NATO	Squad automatic weapon	Belgium	
M60		7.62×51mm NATO	General-purpose machine gun	United States	Six M60s and forty-six M16s stolen in raid on National Guard armoury in Danvers, Massachusetts in August 1976 by the Irish and Italian mafias and purchased by the Harrison Network. Five M60s arrived in Ireland in late 1977, sixth delayed to 1979. Two more M60s seized by police in large weapons shipment at Dublin port in 1979.
MG3		7.62×51mm NATO	General-purpose machine gun	West Germany	Stolen from the Norwegian Army in 1984, security sources theorised an unknown quantity of MG3s were smuggled to Ireland in the late 1980s/early 1990s. Example recovered from an IRA unit arrested in County Donegal in September 1992.
FN MAG		7.62×51mm NATO	General-purpose machine gun	Belgium; Libya	The IRA imported forty MAGs from Libya in the 1980s. British licensed-built L7 version captured from a British Army unit in Tyrone in 1992.
M2 Browning		.50 BMG	Heavy machine gun	United States	First publicly displayed by the IRA in 1977. IRA believed to have smuggled at least two examples into Ireland and used in several attacks on British helicopters in the 1980s. Example found with ammunition by security forces in IRA arms dump in West Belfast in 1986.
DShK		12.7×108mm	Heavy machine gun	Soviet Union; Libya	Security forces estimated the IRA imported twenty-six DShK machine guns from Libya in 1980s.

=== Shotguns ===
Model	Image	Caliber	Type	Origin	Details
Franchi SPAS-12		12-gauge	Combat shotgun	Italy	Example recovered by British security forces after the Loughgall ambush in 1987. Examples recovered from an IRA arms bunker near Strabane in 1988 and an IRA arms dump in north County Donegal in 1989 Example recovered near Letterkenny in 1992 by Gardaí from an IRA unit captured while preparing for a large-scale attack. Examples were also found in an arms hide in Belfast in 1990 and in a large arms dump at an IRA base in north London in 1990. According to former senior IRA member and British informer Declan Casey, the IRA's West Tyrone Brigade favoured the SPAS-12 for close-range attacks.
Homemade Shotgun		12-gauge	Single-shot	Ireland	

== Explosives ==
Model	Image	Type	Origin	Details
IED		Improvised explosive device	Ireland	The IRA employed ANFO, Gelignite, Goma-2 and Semtex.
Petrol bomb		Incendiary device	Ireland	
Mk 2		Hand Grenade	United States	
M67 grenade		Hand Grenade	United States	Examples discovered in a large hidden arms bunker under a farm outhouse in Gormanston, County Meath in 1991.
F-1 grenade		Hand Grenade	Soviet Union; Libya	Used in IRA attacks in early 1980s. At least 600 F1 grenades were seized aboard the freighter Eksund in 1987.
RGD-5		Hand Grenade	Soviet Union	Two RGD-5 grenades thrown at a British Army patrol in IRA attack in Belfast in 1989.

== Grenade launchers ==
Model	Image	Cartridge	Type	Origin	Details
M79		40×46mm grenade	Grenade launcher	United States	A single example discovered in a large hidden arms bunker under a farm outhouse in Gormanston, County Meath in 1991. In 1981 the Harrison Network was trying to acquire 40 mm grenades suitable for an M79 grenade launcher, according to FBI testimony.
Improvised Projected Grenade		unknown, 40 ounces (1.1 kg) Semtex and TNT	Improvised launcher	Ireland	First appeared in 1985. Heavy recoil left bruising on operator's shoulder. Succeeded by the Projected Recoilless Improvised Grenade.

== Anti-tank weapons ==
Model	Image	Caliber	Type	Origin	Details
Boys Anti-tank Rifle		.55 Boys	Anti-tank rifle	United Kingdom	Two examples recovered, one in Belfast in late 1971 and another in Derry following Operation Motorman in 1972. Derry rifle linked to attack on British Army Saracen APC. 55 rounds found in hidden IRA arms dump in County Donegal in early 1974.
Solothurn S-18/1000		20×138mmB	Anti-tank rifle	Switzerland	In August 1971 the search of a farmhouse outside Cookstown, County Tyrone, by the British Army and RUC uncovered IRA training literature, including a manual for a "Solothurn 20mm anti-tank rifle." IRA unit employed a Solothurn 20mm anti-tank rifle in a battle with the British Army along the County Louth border in January 1972, later captured by Gardaí. Solothurn S-18/1000 seized at New York home of IRA gun runner George Harrison in June 1981. Crate of 20×138mmB Solothurn ammunition found in IRA arms dump outside Kildare in 1990.
M20 "Super Bazooka"		3.5 in (88.9 mm)	Rocket launcher	United States	Several imported from the United States in the late 1950s but first employed by the IRA in late 1971, in Belfast. Supplanted by the RPG-7.
RPG-7		40mm (launcher only, warhead diameter varies)	Rocket-propelled grenade	Soviet Union; Libya	25 launchers and 496 warheads smuggled to Ireland from Libya in late 1972 and further shipments from Libya in 1985–1987. Attempted import from Lebanon intercepted in Antwerp in 1977. First used in 1972, with nearly two hundred attacks involving the RPG-7 recorded by 1981. The IRA was believed to still have upwards of 40 launchers in inventory in 1992.
Pansarvärnsgevär m/42		20×180mm R	Recoilless rifle/Anti-tank rifle	Sweden	Fired on at least three occasions in Belfast in 1983. Example discovered in an IRA arms dump in County Cavan in March 1988.
M40 recoilless rifle		105mm	Recoilless rifle	United States	Several seized during the capture of Libyan arms aboard the freighter Eksund in 1987.
Improvised Anti-Armour Grenade (IAAG) or ‘drogue bomb’		Unknown	Anti-tank grenade	Ireland	Anti-armour grenade manufactured by the IRA. First appeared in late 1987. Design resembled a WW1-era German hand grenade, with a tin can filled with Semtex with a handle and a parachute device. Parachute ensured a copper cone attached to the top was the first point of contact, facilitating a shaped charge effect.
Projected Recoilless Improvised Grenade		unknown, 1-pound (0.45 kg) tin can filled with 600g of Semtex formed into a shaped charge	Improvised launcher	Ireland	First appeared in 1991. Design, including a counter-balance mechanism, believed to have been inspired by the Armbrust launcher.
Raufoss Mk 211		.50 BMG	Multi-purpose armor-piercing projectile	United States	Several smuggled from the United States in the late 1990s.

== Anti-aircraft weapons ==
Model	Image	Diameter	Type	Origin	Details
9K32 Strela-2		72mm	Man-portable air-defense system	Soviet Union; Libya	Designated SA-7 Grail by NATO. Most shipments of Grails to Northern Ireland seized in 1987. Some later sold to ETA.

== Flamethrowers ==
Model	Image	Type	Origin	Details
M2		Flamethrower	United States	Single example seized at New York home of IRA gun runner George Harrison in June 1981.
LPO-50		Flamethrower	Soviet Union; Libya	IRA acquired ten flamethrowers from Libya in the 1980s. Used in assault on border base in County Fermanagh in 1989. LPO-50 found in Belfast by security forces before it could be used in late 1988, example also discovered in Derry in 1989 and in County Meath in 1994.
Self-propelled flamethrower		Improvised flamethrower	Ireland	Improvised flamethrower using a liquid manure spreader filled with fuel mix. Employed in a number of attacks on British Army fortifications in the early 1990s.

== Mortars ==
Model	Image	Caliber	Type	Origin	Details
Barrack buster		360mm	Improvised mortar	Ireland	"Barrack buster" most powerful of a series of IRA home-made mortars from early 1970s onwards. British military analysts assessed the conventional-style bipod and baseplate 60mm "Mark 6" model in 1993 as "extremely well-made and may easily be mistaken for military models."
M-37		82mm	Infantry mortar	Soviet Union; Libya	Several (reportedly 12) seized aboard the Libyan arms freighter Eksund in 1987. The consignment also included mortar rounds of Chinese manufacture.

== See also ==
- Improvised tactical vehicles of the Provisional IRA
- List of weapons used by the Irish National Liberation Army

== Bibliography ==
- French, Laurence Armand (2018). The History of Policing America: From Militias and Military to the Law Enforcement of Today. Lanham, Maryland, USA: Rowman & Littlefield Publishers. ISBN 978-1538102039.
- Holtom, Paul; James, Paul; Patmore, Connor, From the IRA to ISIS: Exploring terrorist access to the UK's illicit firearms market (PDF), p. 369
