= List of weapons used by the Irish National Liberation Army =

List of weapons used by the Irish National Liberation Army during The Troubles (1969–1997).

== Sources ==
Obtaining arms was one of the greatest difficulties faced by the INLA in its early years. Their Marxism made them beyond help from Catholic Irish-America, who had traditionally been a lifeline for funds and weapons for Irish republicans engaged in armed struggle. At a time when the Provisional IRA seemed replete with Armalites, the INLA was mainly armed with shotguns, which the rank and file wryly took to calling "Costello-ites" after their leader. The INLA's main source of arms early on was from sympathizers in the Middle East, from where they imported a contingent of AK-pattern rifles in 1978 and later much larger shipments of arms via a French contact.

== Small arms ==
Model	Image	Caliber	Type	Origin	Details
Pistols
PA63		9×18mm Makarov	Pistol	Hungarian People's Republic	
Walther PPK		9×17mm Short (.380 ACP)	Pistol	Germany	Stolen from an off-duty Royal Irish Regiment soldier's car in Dublin in 1994.
Rifles
Lee–Enfield		.303 British	Bolt action rifle	United Kingdom	Used in a sniper attack as late as 1989.
M1 Garand		.30-06 Springfield	Semi-automatic rifle	United States	
Ruger Mini-14		5.56×45mm NATO	Semi-automatic rifle	United States	
SKS		7.62×39mm	Semi-automatic rifle	Soviet Union	
Springfield Armory M1A		7.62×51mm NATO	Semi-automatic rifle	United States	
Assault rifles
AK-47		7.62×39mm	Assault rifle	Soviet Union	
M16		5.56×45mm NATO	Assault rifle	United States	
CAR-15 Commando		5.56×45mm NATO	Assault rifle	United States	Imported around 1985.
Sig 540		5.56×45mm NATO	Assault Rifle	Switzerland	Reportedly taken from an INLA arms cache by the IRA in 1984. Also reported in the possession of the INLA in Newry in 1986. "Swiss-made automatic weapon" reportedly used in attack on UDR soldier in Armagh in 1987.
RK 62		.223 Remington/5.56×45mm NATO	Assault rifle	Finland	Several smuggled into Ireland in late 1984 and used in several INLA attacks, including abortive assassination attempt targeting Ian Paisley. A single example seen at INLA funeral in 2019. Possible civilian version with long barrel and different muzzle brake, chambered in .223/5.56.
Submachine guns
M3 submachine gun		.45 ACP	Submachine Gun	United States	
Sterling submachine gun		9×19mm Parabellum	Submachine Gun	United Kingdom	
Uzi		9×19mm Parabellum	Submachine Gun	Israel	
Škorpion vz. 61		9×19mm Parabellum	Submachine Gun	Czechoslovak Socialist Republic	
MP5		9×19mm Parabellum	Submachine Gun	West Germany	Stolen from a Royal Ulster Constabulary vehicle in May 2000.
