= Ian Corden-Lloyd =

British Army officer (1938–1978)

Iain Corden-Lloyd
- Born: 27 May 1938; Durban, South Africa
- Died: 17 February 1978 (aged 39); Jonesborough, County Armagh, Northern Ireland
- Military career
- Allegiance: United Kingdom
- Branch: British Army
- Service years: 1958–1978
- Rank: Lieutenant Colonel
- Service number: P/457134
- Commands: 2nd Battalion, Royal Green Jackets
- Conflicts: Indonesia–Malaysia confrontation The Troubles: Operation Demetrius; Operation Banner; 1978 British Army Gazelle shootdown †
- Awards: Officer of the Order of the British Empire; Military Cross; Mentioned in Despatches

Lieutenant Colonel Iain Douglas Corden-Lloyd, OBE, MC (27 May 1938 – 17 February 1978) was a British Army officer and one of the highest ranking soldiers to be killed in action during the Troubles in Northern Ireland.

== Military career ==
Corden-Lloyd was commissioned into the 10th Princess Mary's Own Gurkha Rifles, later transferring to the Royal Green Jackets. He was subsequently seconded to the Special Air Service (SAS). In 1964, while serving in the 10th Princess Mary's Gurkha Rifles in Borneo, Corden-Lloyd was accused of involvement in the torture of an elderly Dayak civilian, on the basis of a Scottish missionary's report. Two soldiers were court-martialled but were not punished after claiming they had been acting under Corden-Lloyd's orders.

In 1971, Corden-Lloyd took part in Operation Demetrius. He was awarded the Military Cross for distinguished service in Northern Ireland in 1972, although at the time the details of his action were not published for security reasons. He became commanding officer of the 2nd Battalion, Royal Green Jackets in 1976. That same year he was invested as an Officer of the Order of the British Empire.

=== Death ===
Corden-Lloyd's battalion was deployed to Northern Ireland in December 1977, at a time when hostilities in the province were at their peak. A few days after their arrival, his troops suffered their first casualties and regular engagements with the Provisional IRA continued over the following weeks. On 17 February, a Green Jackets observation post deployed around the village of Jonesborough began to take heavy fire from the "March Wall", which drew parallel to the border with Ireland to the east, along the Dromad woods. The soldiers returned fire, but the short distance to the border and the open ground prevented them from advancing.

Corden-Lloyd, as commanding officer, along with Captain Philip Schofield and Sergeant Ives flew in a Gazelle helicopter from the base at Bessbrook Mill to assess the situation and provide information to the troops. While flying low and fast over the scene of the engagement, the aircraft came under fire from the IRA. The pilot executed a torque turn and, in so doing, stalled his tail fenestron fan rotor and lost control of the aircraft. The helicopter crashed into the field bordered by the March Wall, around 700 metres from Jonesborough. Corden-Lloyd was killed instantly, while the other two passengers were seriously wounded.

The crash of a British Army helicopter and the death of such a high-ranking officer was used as propaganda by the Provisional IRA, which published a report of the action in An Phoblacht. Corden-Lloyd had been accused by republicans of brutality against Catholic civilians during the Green Jackets tour of 1971. Corden-Lloyd was awarded a posthumous mention in despatches by the British government, "in recognition of gallant and distinguished service in Northern Ireland".

== Personal life ==
Married with three sons at the time of his death, Corden-Lloyd is interred in Magdalen Hill Cemetery, Winchester.
