= 1994 British Army Lynx shootdown =

IRA helicopter shootdown in Northern Ireland

- Part of the Troubles
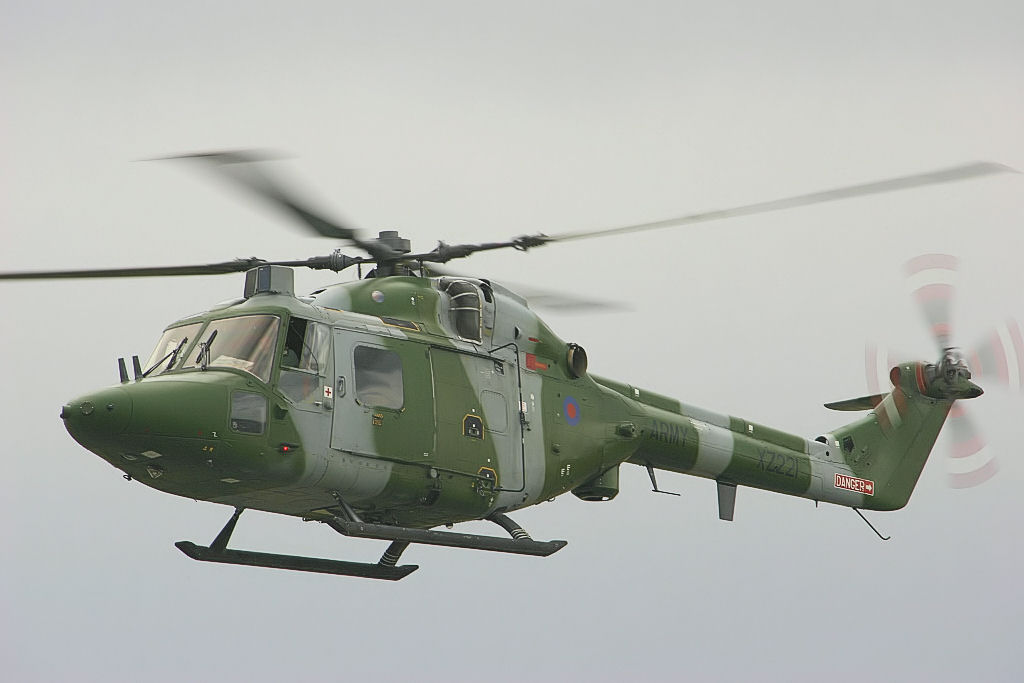
- A British Army Lynx helicopter

- Location: 54°4′33.5″N 6°36′32″W; Crossmaglen, County Armagh, Northern Ireland
- Date: 19 March 1994; 20:27 (GMT)
- Target: British Army base
- Attack type: Mortar
- Injuries: 4
- Perpetrator: Provisional IRA

On 19 March 1994, a British Army Lynx helicopter was shot down by the Provisional Irish Republican Army (IRA) in Northern Ireland. A unit of the IRA's South Armagh Brigade fired a heavy improvised mortar at the British Army base in Crossmaglen, County Armagh. The mortar round hit and shot down the helicopter, serial number ZD275, while it was hovering over the helipad. Three British soldiers and a Royal Ulster Constabulary (RUC) member were wounded.

== Background ==
Since the 1970s, the IRA developed a series of home-made mortars. The goal was to produce devices to be used as "stand-off" weapons, capable of being launched from safe ranges upon police or military outposts and easy to conceal on dead-ground. The development by the provisionals of the Mark 10 mortar multiple-launched mortar led the IRA South Armagh Brigade to conceive the idea of using this type of weapon to engage helicopters as they were hovering over border bases. On 22 June 1983, the IRA attempted to shoot down a Wessex helicopter with a battery of Mark 10 improvised mortars over Crossmaglen, County Armagh. The pilot was forced to undertake an evasive manoeuvre, dropping the helicopter's cargo into the street below. Four mortars failed to explode and the rest landed in the vicinity of the base, causing some damage and slightly injuring a British soldier. A subsequent investigation found that if the mortar base plate had been aligned "five to ten degrees" differently the projectiles likely would have hit the helicopter.

The different improvised mortar designs evolved in 1992 into the Mark 15 mortar, widely known as the "barrack buster". The mortar shell consisted of a one metre long metal propane cylinder with a diameter of 36 cm that contained around 70 kg of home-made explosives and with a range between 75 and 275 m. The cylinder was an adaptation of a commercial 'Kosangas' gas cylinder for heating and cooking gas used in rural areas in Ireland. The first use of the "barrack buster" took place on 7 December 1992 against a joint RUC/British Army base in Ballygawley, County Tyrone. On 11 June 1993, there was a previous IRA bid to shoot down a Puma helicopter taking off from the Crossmaglen base with a Mark 15 mortar. The barrack buster, fired from the back of a local baker's delivery van, exploded on the helipad shortly after the pilot had managed to take off. Two Lynx helicopters escorting the Puma were unable to prevent the attack. The IRA action was carried out to coincide with a one-day visit to Northern Ireland by Queen Elizabeth.

== The attack ==
IRA barrack buster mortar showing base plate and detonator wires

On the evening of 19 March 1994, a Lynx helicopter, serial number ZD275, was in the process of landing at the large British Army base in Crossmaglen. Meanwhile, an IRA unit had mounted a Mark 15 mortar on a tractor, concealed behind bales of hay. The tractor was parked 150 yards (140 m) from the intended target, on waste ground. At 20:27, there was a sudden blackout across Crossmaglen's square and at the same time, a single mortar shell was lobbed into the barracks. The IRA had used the mains for the collapsing circuit of the firing pack, turning off the street's power supply and allowing the mortar's own battery to trigger the launcher. When the Lynx was hovering 100 feet (30 m) over the helipad, the mortar round hit the aircraft on the tail's boom, which was severed from the fuselage. The machine spun out of control, but the pilot was able to crash-land the Lynx inside the base. A Grenadier Guards' patrol spotted the resulting huge orange fireball from a mile away. Three members of the crew managed to get out with minor injuries, but a member of the Royal Ulster Constabulary was trapped inside the blazing wreckage. The constable was rescued just before the fuel tanks and the ammunition started to explode.

Author Toby Harnden described the incident as the most successful IRA operation against a helicopter in the course of the Troubles.

== Aftermath ==
After the incident, the IRA and Sinn Féin were criticised by the Social Democratic and Labour Party Member of the Parliament for the area Seamus Mallon, who said:

God knows how many people could have been killed. When you realise this mortar was lobbed over a number of houses it brings home the enormity of the danger so many people faced. Yet again you have Sinn Féin talking peace in the morning and carrying out these murderous attacks through the IRA in the evening.

John Fee, a local SDLP councillor who described the attack as "an act of lunacy", was later severely beaten by three men, one of them hooded and wearing military-style gear, outside his home. The IRA denied responsibility. Fee was admitted to hospital with broken legs, broken ribs and head injuries.

Corporal Robert Tomlinson of the Royal Military Police was awarded the Queen's Commendation for Valuable Service for his part in coming to the aid of the wounded constable and organising his medical evacuation.

Corporal Wayne Cuckson of the Royal Logistic Corps was awarded the Queen's Gallantry Medal for dragging the wounded constable out of the crashed aircraft. Cuckson, who reached the rank of Warrant Officer Class Two, died on 6 April 2011 in a crash while driving his motorcycle between Abingdon and Oxford.

There was a second mortar attack on a British military helicopter on 12 July 1994, at Newtownhamilton, when an RAF Puma carrying 11 soldiers and an RUC constable crash-landed on a soccer pitch after its tail was hit by shrapnel from a near-miss by another Mark 15 mortar launched from a tractor. The helicopter was lifting off from the local military base. No serious injuries were reported. The Puma, serial number XW225, sustained Category 3 or Category 4 damage on the RAF scale. After returning to service, the machine was definitively written off and scrapped after suffering another, this time deadly, crash-landing in Germany on 15 February 1997.

The downing of two helicopters by mortar fire, along with the increasing sniper activity of the IRA, was both a morale and military blow to the British forces in south County Armagh.

== See also ==
- Chronology of Provisional Irish Republican Army actions (1990–99)
- List of attacks on British aircraft during The Troubles
- Improvised tactical vehicles of the Provisional IRA
