= Silverbridge, County Armagh =

Village in County Armagh, Northern Ireland

Coordinates: 54.110°N 6.523°W

Silverbridge: Irish: Béal Átha an Airgid
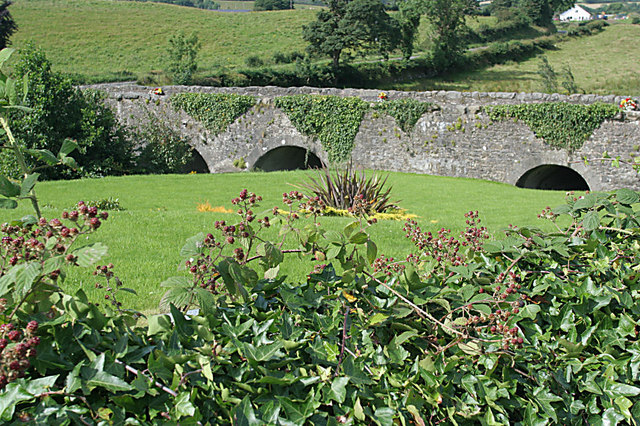
- Bridge over the Cully Water

- Location within Northern Ireland
- Population: 112 (2011)
- District: Newry & Mourne
- County: County Armagh
- Country: Northern Ireland
- Sovereign state: United Kingdom
- Post town: NEWRY
- Postcode district: BT35
- Dialling code: 028, +44 28
- UK Parliament: Newry & Armagh
- NI Assembly: Newry & Armagh

Silverbridge is a small village in the townland of Legmoylin in County Armagh, Northern Ireland. It is within the Newry and Mourne District Council area. In the 2011 Census it had a recorded population of 112. The local GAA club is Silverbridge Harps GFC, which plays football at Senior level in county competitions. The area was historically called Belanargit (from Béal Átha an Airgid meaning "ford mouth of the silver").

== History ==
Silverbridge, along with the rest of South Armagh, would have been transferred to the Irish Free State had the recommendations of the Irish Boundary Commission been enacted in 1925.

On 19 December 1975, during The Troubles, an Ulster Volunteer Force (UVF) attack on Donnelly's Bar & Filling Station resulted in the deaths of Trevor Bracknell, Patrick Donnelly, and Michael Donnelly.

== Sources ==
- NI Neighbourhood Information System

== See also ==
- List of villages in Northern Ireland
- List of towns in Northern Ireland
