= List of Provisional IRA ambushes =

This is a list of ambushes carried out by the Provisional Irish Republican Army (PIRA; latterly IRA without "Provisional") during the Troubles. Most targeted "Crown Forces" within Northern Ireland.

Ambush	Date	Target	IRA strength	Government strength	IRA losses	Government losses
Dungiven landmine and gun attack	24 June 1972	British Army	1 ASU	1 Army Convoy	None	3 British soldiers killed 7 wounded 1 vehicle destroyed 1 vehicle damaged
Drummuckavall ambush	22 November 1975	British Army	12 volunteers	1 infantry section	None	3 British soldiers killed 1 wounded
Garryhinch ambush	16 October 1976	Garda Síochána			None	1 Garda killed 4 wounded
1978 Crossmaglen ambush	21 December 1978	British Army	4–5 volunteers 1 technical	8 soldiers	None	3 British soldiers killed
Warrenpoint ambush	27 August 1979	British Army	1 active service unit (ASU)	50 soldiers	None	18 British soldiers killed 1 vehicle destroyed 1 British Army Wessex helicopter damaged
Dungannon land mine attack	16 December 1979	British Army	1 ASU	1 mobile patrol	None	4 British soldiers killed 1 vehicle destroyed
Glasdrumman ambush	17 July 1981	British Army	~7 volunteers	18 soldiers	None	1 British soldier killed 1 wounded
1989 Jonesborough ambush	20 March 1989	Royal Ulster Constabulary (RUC)	6 volunteers	2 constables (Harry Breen and Bob Buchanan)	None	Breen and Buchanan were both killed
Operation Conservation	6 May 1990	British Army	1 ASU	1 Infantry section	None	1 British soldier killed
1990 Lough Neagh ambush	10 November 1990	RUC	1 ASU	2 constables (Thomas Taylor and David Murphy); Later joined by 1 former Ulster Defence Regiment (UDR) soldier (Norman Kendall) and 1 civilian (Keith Dowey)	None	4 killed
Mullacreevie ambush	1 March 1991	British Army (UDR)	1 ASU	1 mobile patrol	None	2 British soldiers killed 2 wounded 1 vehicle destroyed
1992 Cappagh ambush	12 May 1992	British Army	1 ASU	British Army foot patrol	None	1 British soldier lost his legs
1993 Fivemiletown ambush	12 December 1993	RUC; British Army	2 ASUs	1 mobile patrol 1 helicopter (follow-up operation)	None	2 constables killed 1 vehicle disabled 1 British Army Lynx helicopter fired at in the follow-up operation
Killeeshil ambush	15 July 1994	RUC	1 ASU; 1 technical	1 mobile patrol	None	3 constables wounded 2 civilians wounded 1 vehicle disabled
