= Ballygawley bus bombing =

1988 attack in Northern Ireland

- Part of the Troubles
- Location: 54°30′13″N 7°10′02″W; A5 motorway near Ballygawley, County Tyrone, Northern Ireland
- Date: 20 August 1988; 12:30 a.m.
- Target: British Army personnel
- Attack type: Roadside bomb
- Deaths: 8 soldiers
- Injuries: 28 soldiers
- Perpetrator: Provisional IRA

On 20 August 1988, a roadside bomb attack was carried out by the Provisional Irish Republican Army (IRA) on a bus carrying British soldiers in Northern Ireland. It occurred in the townland of Curr near Ballygawley, County Tyrone. The attack killed eight soldiers and wounded 28. In the wake of the bombing, the British Army began ferrying its troops in and out of County Tyrone by helicopter.

== Background ==
The Irish Times reported that "This stretch of road has been a favourite ambush spot for successive generations of IRA men since the 1920s". The Provisional IRA had been attacking British Army patrols and convoys with roadside bombs regularly since the beginning of the Troubles in the early 1970s. Most of these attacks took place in rural parts of Northern Ireland; especially eastern and southern County Tyrone (where the IRA's Tyrone Brigade was active) and southern County Armagh (heartland of the South Armagh Brigade). In August 1979, the IRA ambushed a British Army convoy with two large roadside bombs near Warrenpoint, killing eighteen soldiers. This was the deadliest attack on the British Army in Northern Ireland during the Troubles. In December 1979, four more British soldiers were killed on Ballygawley Road in the Dungannon land mine attack. In May 1981, five British soldiers were killed when their Saracen APC was ripped apart by a roadside bomb at Altnaveigh, County Armagh. In July 1983, four UDR soldiers were killed when their vehicle struck an IRA landmine near Ballygawley, County Tyrone. In December 1985, the Tyrone IRA launched an assault on the police barracks in Ballygawley, shooting dead two officers and destroying the barracks with a bomb.

In June 1988, six off-duty British soldiers were killed when an IRA bomb exploded underneath their van in Lisburn. It had been attached to the van as they were taking part in a charity marathon.

== Attack ==
On the night of 19/20 August 1988, an unmarked 52-seater bus was transporting 36 soldiers of The Light Infantry from RAF Aldergrove to a military base near Omagh. The soldiers, who came from England, had just finished 18 months of a two-year tour of duty in Northern Ireland and were returning to the base after a short holiday.

As it was driving along the main road from Ballygawley to Omagh, at about 12:30AM, IRA members remotely detonated a roadside bomb containing 200 pounds (91 kg) of Semtex. According to police, the bomb had been planted in a vehicle by the roadside and had been detonated by command wire from 330 yards (300 m) away. A statement by one of the survivors claims instead that the roadside bomb was made of "two fertilizer bags filled with semtex". The blast hurled the bus 30 metres down the road and threw the soldiers into neighbouring hedges and fields. It left a crater 6 feet (1.8 m) deep and scattered body parts and twisted metal over a wide area. Witnesses described finding dead, dying and wounded soldiers strewn on the road and caught in the wreckage of the bus. Others were walking around, "stunned". Some of the first to arrive on the scene and offer help were loyalist bandsmen of the Omagh Protestant Boy's Band returning from a parade in Portadown, who had also been travelling in buses.

Eight of the soldiers were killed and the remaining 28 were wounded. The soldiers killed were: Jayson Burfitt (aged 19), Richard Greener (aged 21), Mark Norsworthy (aged 18), Stephen Wilkinson (aged 18), Jason Winter (aged 19), Blair Bishop (aged 19), Alexander Lewis (aged 18) and Peter Bullock (aged 21). This was the single biggest loss of life for the British Army from an IRA attack in Northern Ireland since the Warrenpoint ambush in 1979, although eleven off-duty British soldiers had been killed in the Droppin Well bombing in 1982, carried out by the Irish National Liberation Army (INLA). An account from one of the survivors was published in Ken Wharton's book A Long Long War: Voices from the British Army in Northern Ireland, 1969–98.

An inquest into the attack was told that the road was usually off-limits to military vehicles, due to the threat from the IRA. The driver of the bus, who was also a soldier, claimed he had been directed on to the road by diversion signs. The inquest heard that signs had not been placed by the police or the roads service. The IRA denied placing any signs and said that military buses often used the road. The mother of one of those killed accused the British military of negligence and claimed it was "trying to conceal the truth".

== Aftermath ==
Shortly thereafter, the Provisional IRA issued a statement claiming responsibility. It said that the attack had been carried out by its Tyrone Brigade and added: "We will not lay down our arms until the peace of a British disengagement from Ireland is granted to our nation". The security forces suspected that an informer may have told the IRA of the bus's route and the time it would pass a specific spot. After the attack the British military decided to start ferrying their troops to and from East Tyrone by helicopter to avoid any future attacks like this.

Tom King, then British Government's Northern Ireland Secretary, said there was "some evidence" that the explosives used were part of a consignment from Libya (see Provisional IRA arms importation). He also stated that the possibility of reintroducing internment was "under review". Libyan weaponry enabled the IRA to mount some of its biggest operations during its campaign. The Ballygawley bus bombing is believed to have been one of these attacks. One former IRA member later suggested that Semtex explosive was not crucial to the outcome of the attack; "we were having plenty of success without Semtex... at Ballygawley we "only" got eight, but it was a bus of about fifty-six. If we'd used a fertiliser bomb, the whole bus would have been destroyed.

On 30 August 1988, three IRA members were ambushed and killed by the Special Air Service (SAS) at Drumnakilly, County Tyrone. According to author Nick Van der Bijl the men—Gerard Harte, Martin Harte and Brian Mullin—were identified by British intelligence as the perpetrators of the bombing. Peter Taylor, instead, says that only Mullin was suspected, and that plans for the SAS operation were already underway at the time of the IRA attack.

Two months after the attack, the British Government introduced the broadcasting ban. It meant that the voices of Sinn Féin and IRA members were not allowed to be broadcast on television or radio. The Ballygawley bus bombing is believed to have influenced the Government's decision to introduce the ban.

According to state papers declassified in 2019, the attack sparked "panic" in the British Government, and tension between the RUC and the British Army over whose fault it was for the security lapse. British Prime Minister Margaret Thatcher warned RUC chief, John Hermon, that she would no longer send British troops over "in waves to be killed".

== See also ==
- 1993 Fivemiletown ambush
- Chronology of Provisional Irish Republican Army actions (1980–1989)
- M62 coach bombing
- Teebane bombing
- The Troubles in Ballygawley
