= Mullacreevie ambush =

1991 IRA attack in Northern Ireland

Mullaghcreevie ambush
- Part of the Troubles and Operation Banner
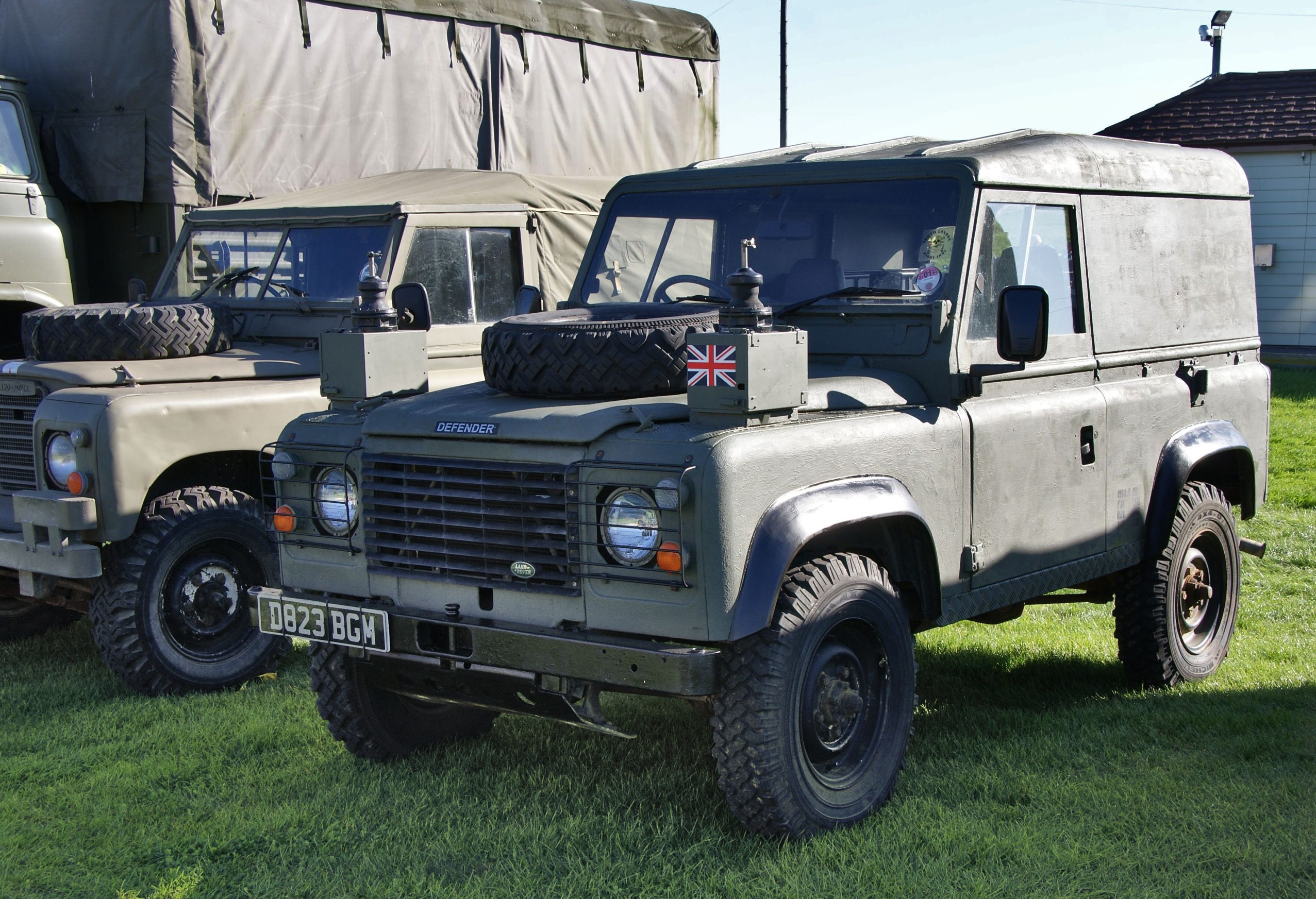
- A British Army Land Rover Defender
Date	1 March 1991
Location	Mullacreevie, Armagh City 54°20′39.36″N 6°40′12.10″W
Result	IRA victory: Mobile patrol out of action

Belligerents
Provisional IRA	United Kingdom • British Army (UDR)

Strength
1 active service unit	1 mobile patrol

Casualties and losses
None	2 soldiers killed 2 wounded 1 vehicle destroyed
- Location within Northern Ireland

The Mullacreevie ambush took place on 1 March 1991, when a mobile patrol of the Ulster Defence Regiment composed of two Land Rover vehicles was attacked with an improvised horizontal mortar by a Provisional IRA active service unit from the North Armagh Brigade while passing near Mullacreevie housing estate, on the west side of Armagh City. One member of the UDR was killed instantly when the leading Land Rover was hit, while another died of wounds two days later. Two other soldiers were maimed for life.

== IRA improvised horizontal mortars ==
According to author Tony Geraghty, British authorities learnt of the first horizontal mortar produced by the Provisional IRA, the Mark 12, in 1985. The weapon was recovered after an incident in which three IRA volunteers were killed by security forces. The launcher suffered from the limitation of a heavy recoil, which made the handling of the device difficult. One British intelligence report say that while the launcher was quite crude, the grenade was made of "a number of components which require a high standard of machine manufacturing." The projectile had a warhead of 40 ounces (1.1 kg) of semtex and TNT. It was used basically as a standoff weapon, in which the grenade was lofted over the security bases' fences or against armoured vehicles. The mortar had an effective range of 70 yards, within which it could pierce an armour plate or destroy a sangar.

Later in the conflict the IRA developed the Mark 16, a new version with improved armour-piercing capabilities, usually referred to as a "projected recoilless improvised grenade".

== The ambush ==
On the evening of 1 March 1991, a two-vehicle mobile patrol belonging to the 2nd Battalion, Ulster Defence Regiment was approaching the western outskirts of Armagh city on Killylea road. When driving along Mullacreevie housing estate, the two Land Rovers were held by temporary traffic lights at roadworks. Unknown to them, an IRA unit from the North Armagh Brigade had set a Mark 12 launcher on a hump of earth in the front garden of a house besides the lights. After the incident, IRA sources described the device as a "directional missile".

When the first Land Rover pulled off after the lights turned green, the mortar 's improvised grenade was fired by command-wire from the backyard of the house by IRA members concealed behind a digger. The projectile hit the coachwork, blowing away both sides and the roof of the military vehicle. Witnesses reported that the Land Rover was "ripped apart". The soldiers inside were immediately assisted by fellow UDR members, who helped to drag the wounded out of the shattered wreckage.

Private Paul Sutcliffe, a 32-year-old Englishman who had served for four years with the Duke of Wellington's Regiment before becoming a UDR soldier in 1989, died on the spot. The driver, Private Roger Love, a 20-year-old from Portadown, succumbed to his injuries three days later. Two other servicemen were maimed by the explosion. One of them suffered severe chest wounds, and lost the use of one arm; the other had a leg amputated below the knee.

The ambush at Mullacreevie was the first time that a Mark 12 mortar was used successfully.

== Aftermath ==
Roger Love's family donated the deceased soldier's kidneys after they authorized the medical staff to disconnect the life-supporting machine. A UDR party attended Paul Sutcliffe's funeral at his hometown of Barrowford, Lancashire, the only UDR military funeral held outside Northern Ireland. His ashes were scattered in the Mourne Mountains.

Another horizontal mortar attack on a UDR mobile patrol took place on 6 November, when Private Michael Boxall was killed in Bellaghy after the Land Rover he was riding on was hit by a Mark 12 grenade. A fellow soldier lost one eye in the attack. Incidentally, constable Erik Clarke, another Englishmen who had also served in the British Army in Northern Ireland from 1973 to 1978, was killed that year by the same kind of weapon while riding on a combined Royal Ulster Constabulary (RUC) – British Army mobile patrol in an early Mark 12 attack. The incident took place on 17 September at Swatragh, County Londonderry. Clarke had married a local woman and later joined the RUC.

The Mark 12 mortar was used by the IRA until 1993, when it was superseded by the Mark 16. The Mark 16 was fired on eleven occasions by the IRA from late 1993 to early 1994.

== See also ==
- Chronology of Provisional Irish Republican Actions (1990–1999)
- Attack on UDR Clogher barracks
- Ballygawley land mine attack
- 1990 Downpatrick roadside bomb
- 1993 Fivemiletown ambush
