= Forkhill beer keg bombing =

1975 IRA bomb attack

- Part of the Troubles
- Location: Tullydonnell, near Forkhill, County Armagh, Northern Ireland
- Date: 17 July 1975
- Weapon: Improvised explosive device
- Deaths: 4 British soldiers
- Injuries: 1
- Perpetrators: Provisional IRA; South Armagh Brigade

On 17 July 1975 the South Armagh Brigade of the Provisional Irish Republican Army (IRA) detonated an improvised bomb inside a beer keg when it was being investigated by British Army soldiers. Four soldiers were killed and another seriously injured. This was the first major breach in the truce negotiated by the IRA and British government in February 1975. The attack took place in Forkhill, County Armagh. It was one of many such attacks by the IRA in the 1970s.

== Attack ==
On 17 July 1975, Major Peter Willis, the Green Howards company commander in Crossmaglen was accompanied by three British soldiers, all of whom were bomb disposal experts. They were investigating a milk churn at Cortreasla Bridge in Tullydonnell. They walked through a gap in a hedge beside a signpost. As they did so, a 70 lb (32 kg) bomb that had been packed into a beer keg and buried in the ground, was detonated by command wire from about 400 yd (370 m) away. Four soldiers were killed outright with another injured by shrapnel.

The soldiers killed were Major Peter Willis (37), Edward Garside (34), Robert McCarter (33) and Calvert Brown (25). They were the first British soldiers to be killed by the IRA since the February truce.

== Aftermath ==
The IRA claimed in a statement that the attack had been retaliation for the killing of two IRA members. British Secretary of State for Northern Ireland, Merlyn Rees, condemned those responsible for the killings.

IRA member Pat Thompson was convicted of the attack in March 1976. Thompson signed a statement saying that the Crossmaglen IRA unit planned and carried out the attack. Thompson maintains, however, that he was forced to sign the statement after receiving beatings and threats to his family. Thompson was not released until 1991, serving 15 years.

== See also ==
- Chronology of Provisional Irish Republican Army actions (1970–1979)
- Ballygawley land mine attack
- Altnaveigh landmine attack
- Dungannon land mine attack
