= Dungiven landmine and gun attack =

IRA attack near Dungiven in 1972

- Part of the Troubles and Operation Banner
Date	24 June 1972
Location	Crabarkey near Dungiven, County Londonderry, Northern Ireland 54°55′40.8″N 6°55′30″W
Result	Successful IRA Operation

Belligerents
Provisional IRA	United Kingdom British Army

Commanders and leaders
Unknown	Sergeant Stuart Reid †

Strength
	1 army convoy

Casualties and losses
None	3 killed 7 wounded 1 vehicle destroyed 1 vehicle damaged
- Location within Northern Ireland

On 24 June 1972, in the rural townland of Crabarkey near Dungiven, the Provisional IRA detonated an improvised land mine, killing three British Army soldiers in a Land Rover. It was one of many such landmine attacks by the IRA in rural areas in the 1970s.

== Attack ==
The attack occurred in the early morning of 24 June 1972 at Crabarkey, on the main A6 Belfast to Derry road just outside Dungiven. An army Land Rover was escorting a lorry that was transporting a crippled helicopter, damaged in a crash landing, toward RAF Aldergrove in County Antrim. The bomb was packed into two milk churns that weighed a total of 120 pounds (54 kg). IRA volunteers hiding about 200 yards away detonated the land mine by command wire as the convoy passed, catching seven soldiers in the blast, killing three and injuring four. Immediately after the blast, an IRA unit opened fire on the lorry that had been following the Land Rover, wounding three more soldiers including a helicopter pilot. The three soldiers killed in the blast were Lance-Corporal David Moon (24) of No. 664 Squadron AAC, Private Christopher Stevenson (24) of the Parachute Regiment and Sergeant Stuart Reid (28) of the Royal Electrical and Mechanical Engineers.

== Aftermath ==
Malachy Bernard O'Kane, a farmer, was convicted of the attack and was ordered to serve at least 25 years of a life term. A year after he was sentenced, his mother and his two brothers attempted to help him escape from Magilligan Prison. One brother was to disguise himself as Malachy and switch places. All three were caught and sentenced to 18 months imprisonment, the mother's sentence being suspended. O'Kane was given a five-year sentence, to run concurrently with his life term. O'Kane was later released from prison and unsuccessfully ran as a Sinn Féin candidate in the 1997 UK general election but was successful in gaining a seat on Limavady Council the same year in the 1997 local election.

=== Previous and later land mine attacks ===
This was not the first or last land mine attack by the IRA that resulted in the deaths of multiple British soldiers in 1972.

- On the 10 February 1972 two soldiers were killed in Cullyhanna, south County Armagh on a mobile patrol.
- On the 2 June two British soldiers were killed while on foot patrol near Rosslea, County Fermanagh.
- On the 16 July 1972 two British soldiers were killed by a land mine while travelling in their Armoured Personnel Carrier in Carran near Crossmaglen, County Armagh.
- On the 7 August 1972 two British soldiers were killed by a land mine while on mobile patrol in Forfey near Lisnaskea, County Fermanagh.
- On the 10 September 1972 three British soldiers were killed in a land mine attack while travelling near Dungannon, County Tyrone in their Armoured Personnel Carrier.

In total 16 British soldiers were killed from land mine attacks in 1972.

Land mine & culvert bomb attacks would become a key feature of IRA attacks against the British Army & RUC throughout the 1970s, with the mines becoming increasingly more powerful. The vast majority of the land mine attacks occurred in rural areas where there was less chance of civilians being hurt, like west Fermanagh, south Armagh & east Tyrone the most devastating attack being the Warrenpoint Ambush, in August 1979 in which 18 soldiers were killed and at least 20 injured.

== See also ==
- Forkhill beer keg bombing
- Warrenpoint ambush
- Dungannon land mine attack
- Altnaveigh landmine attack
