= List of Irish Republican Army ambushes =

For lists of Irish Republican Army ambushes, see:

- List of IRA ambushes of the Irish War of Independence (1919–1921)
- List of Provisional IRA ambushes (1970–1998)
- The following articles include ambushes by other Irish Republican Army organisations:
  - Northern campaign (Irish Republican Army) (1942–1944)
  - Border campaign (Irish Republican Army) (1956–1962)
  - Articles in Category:Timelines of the Troubles (Northern Ireland) (from 1970)
