= Downpatrick landmine attack =

1990 roadside bombing in County Down, Northern Ireland by the IRA

- Part of the Troubles
- Downpatrick landmine attack (Northern Ireland)
- Location: 54°19′19.2″N 5°42′10.8″W; Ballydugan Road, Downpatrick, County Down, Northern Ireland
- Date: 9 April 1990
- Target: Ulster Defence Regiment
- Attack type: Improvised land mine
- Deaths: 4 soldiers
- Injuries: 4 soldiers, 1 civilian
- Perpetrator: Provisional IRA

On 9 April 1990, the South Down Brigade of the Provisional Irish Republican Army (IRA) detonated a massive improvised land mine under a British Army convoy outside Downpatrick, County Down, Northern Ireland. Four soldiers of the Ulster Defence Regiment (UDR) were killed, the regiment's greatest loss of life since 1983.

== Background ==
The Provisional IRA had been attacking British Army patrols and convoys with landmines and roadside bombs since the beginning of its campaign in the early 1970s. The deadliest attack was the Warrenpoint ambush of August 1979, when 18 soldiers were killed by two large roadside bombs near Warrenpoint, County Down. In July 1983, four soldiers of the local Ulster Defence Regiment (UDR) were killed when their vehicle struck an IRA landmine near Ballygawley, County Tyrone. It was the UDR's biggest loss of life up until then.

== Attack ==
On the morning of 9 April 1990, two UDR armoured Land Rovers were travelling from Ballykinler Barracks to Downpatrick. An IRA unit had planted a 1,000-pound (450 kg) improvised landmine in a culvert under the Ballydugan Road, just outside the town. The unit waited in woodland overlooking the road, about 350 ft (110 m) away. As the Land Rovers drove over the culvert, the IRA detonated the bomb by command wire. The huge blast blew the vehicle into a field and gouged a large crater in the road, 50 ft (15 m) wide and 15 ft (5 m) deep. A witness described "a scene of utter carnage". Four soldiers were killed: Michael Adams (23), John Birch (28), John Bradley (25), and Steven Smart (23). It was the biggest loss of life suffered by the UDR since the 1983 Ballygawley landmine attack. The soldiers in the other Land Rover suffered severe shock and were airlifted to hospital. Police said a civilian driver also suffered shock and another received cuts and bruises.

== Aftermath ==
The bombers escaped on a motorcycle which had been stolen in Newry a week earlier, and was later found abandoned in the Flying Horse Estate in Downpatrick. The IRA issued a statement saying the attack was carried out by members of its South Down Brigade.

British Prime Minister, Margaret Thatcher, said on BBC radio: You take these murders of these four people today alongside those decisions in the Supreme Court of the Republic not to extradite those accused of violent crime - and one is very, very depressed. Charles Haughey, the Taoiseach of the Republic of Ireland, condemned the attack as an "atrocity".

A 23 year-old man was later sentenced to 15 years in prison for the attack. He had driven a scout car for the bombers when it was planted the day before the attack.

== See also ==
- Dungiven landmine and gun attack
- Dungannon land mine attack
- Ballygawley land mine attack
- Improvised explosive device
