= Narrow Water Castle =

16th-century tower house in Northern Ireland

Coordinates: 54.1148°N 6.2828°W

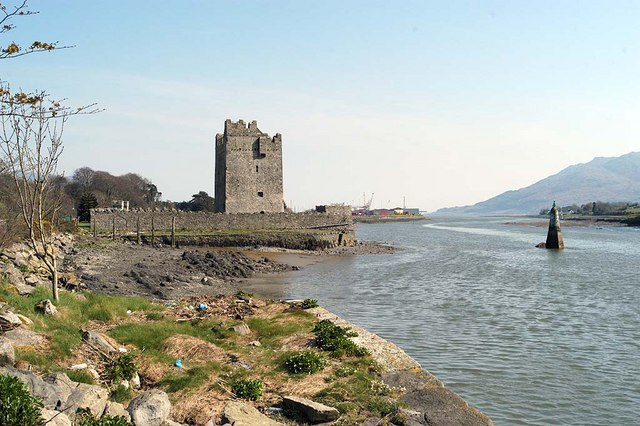
Narrow Water Castle, looking south (the road is to the left of the picture)

Narrow Water Castle (Irish: Caisleán an Chaoil; Ulster-Scots: Narra Wattèr Castle), also known locally as Narrow Water Keep, is a 16th-century tower house and bawn near Warrenpoint in Northern Ireland. It was occupied by the Hall family from the 17th until the 19th century, when they built a large Elizabethan revival-style mansion, also known as Narrow Water Castle, within the same townland.

The tower house is beside the A2 road and on the County Down bank of the Clanrye (Newry) River, which enters Carlingford Lough 1 mile (1.6 km) to the south. It is a historic monument in state care, within Newry and Mourne District Council district, in the townland of Narrow Water. The 16th-century tower house (keep) was given into state care in 1956. The 19th-century mansion remains a private residence of the Hall family.

== History ==
=== Medieval keep and tower house ===
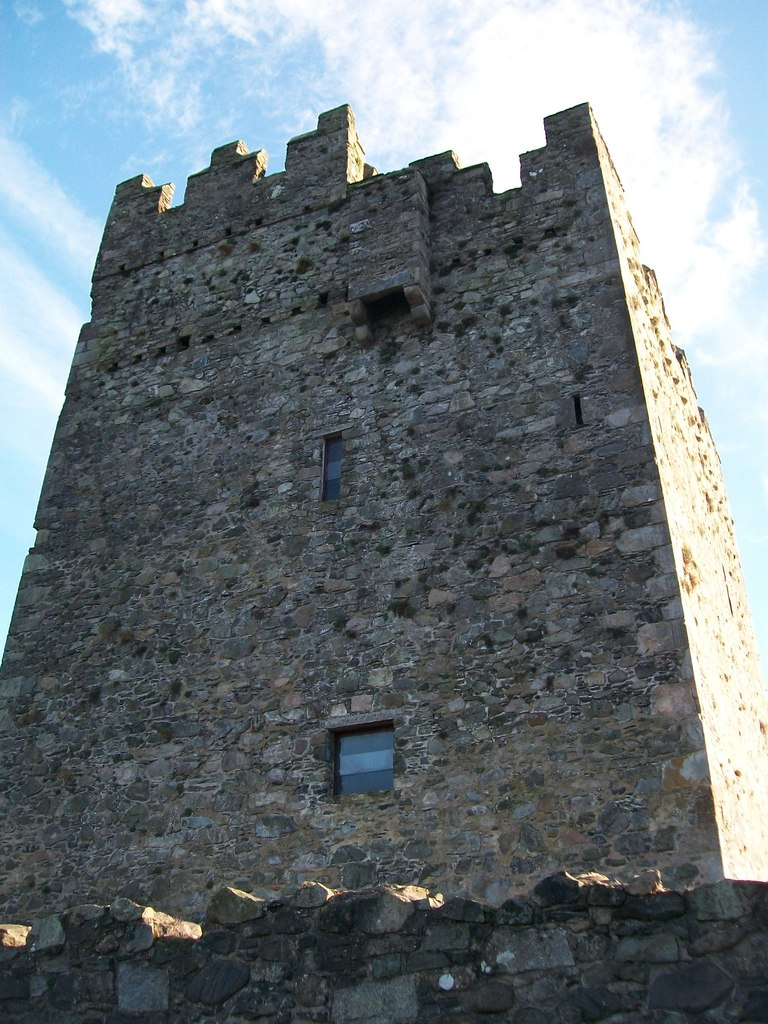
Western facade of the tower house (keep) at Narrow Water

Originally the site of a 13th century Norman keep (associated with Hugh de Lacy, 1st Earl of Ulster), a replacement tower house and bawn was built at Narrow Water (by the Magennis family) in the 16th century. The replacement structure, built in the 1560s, was a typical example of the tower houses built throughout Ireland at the time. This kind of building, often rectangular in plan and three or more storeys high, comprised a series of superimposed chambers, with stairs, closets and latrines built within the walls (which are 1.5 metres or five feet thick in places).

In the second half of the 16th century, following the Cromwellian conquest of Ireland, the castle and its lands were confiscated and granted to Joseph Deane. The castle, which was damaged and captured during the Irish Rebellion of 1641, was sold to the Hall family in the 1670s. It was occupied by the Hall family until they built a new mansion nearby in the early 19th century.

=== 19th-century mansion ===
View of the manor house (mansion) at Narrow Water from across the river

The Hall family, who had lived in the area since the late 17th century, commenced construction of an "Elizabethan revival style" mansion on the Narrow Water estate lands in 1816. The new house, also known as Narrow Water Castle, was designed by the architect Thomas Duff and completed in 1836. While occasionally opened to visitors by appointment, it remains a private home of the Hall family.

=== 20th and 21st centuries ===
On 27 August 1979, 18 British Army soldiers were killed by the Provisional IRA in an ambush near Narrow Water Castle. It was the greatest single loss of life for the British Army during the Troubles.

As of mid-2026, a bridge was under construction near the castle. While, in July 2013, Louth County Council announced that the projected costs were prohibitive and the project was not progressed at that stage, by 2023, Taoiseach Leo Varadkar committed to examining the feasibility of co-funding the project. Initial development work on the "Narrow Water Bridge" commenced in June 2024. As of April 2026, the bridge was reportedly "expected to be completed by the end of 2027".

== See also ==
- List of castles in Northern Ireland
