= Altnaveigh landmine attack =

1981 IRA attack in Northern Ireland

- Part of the Troubles and Operation Banner
- Location: 54°31′42″N 7°12′39″W; Chancellors Road, Altnaveigh, County Armagh, Northern Ireland
- Date: 19 May 1981
- Target: British Army soldiers
- Attack type: Land mine
- Deaths: 5 British soldiers
- Perpetrator: Provisional IRA

In the Altnaveigh landmine attack of 19 May 1981, five British soldiers were killed and their armoured vehicle destroyed by a Provisional IRA landmine at Altnaveigh, a rural area outside Newry in County Armagh, Northern Ireland. The landmine was detonated remotely when the vehicle passed over it. The attack happened during a period of heightened tension over the 1981 Irish hunger strike.

== Background ==
Since 1970, the IRA had been waging a guerrilla campaign against the British security forces in Northern Ireland. This campaign was particularly intense in the rural south of County Armagh, which borders the Republic of Ireland. The IRA's South Armagh Brigade regularly launched attacks on British Army and Royal Ulster Constabulary (RUC) patrols. In April 1979, four RUC officers were killed and their armoured vehicle destroyed by a roadside bomb in Bessbrook. Later that year, 18 British soldiers were killed by roadside bombs in the Warrenpoint ambush, the deadliest attack on British troops during the conflict.

In March 1981, IRA prisoners began a hunger strike in a bid to have political status reinstated. One of the hunger strikers, Raymond McCreesh, was from Camlough in south County Armagh, the attack occurred two days before McCreesh died on the strike on 21 May 1981. There were mass protests and an increase in IRA activity during the strike.

== Attack ==
On 19 May, two British Army Saracen armoured vehicles were travelling along Chancellors Road in the rural area of Altnaveigh, west of Newry. The IRA had planted a 1,000-pound (450 kg) landmine in a culvert underneath the road. When the second vehicle passed the spot, the landmine was detonated by radio remote control. The blast destroyed the vehicle, hurled its wrecked engine over the nearby Belfast–Dublin railway line, and left a large crater in the road.

The five soldiers in the vehicle were killed outright. They were Paul Bulman (19), Michael Bagshaw (25), Andrew Gavin (19), John King (20) and Grenville Winstone (27). All belonged to the Royal Green Jackets, except driver Paul Bulman of the Royal Corps of Transport. It was the deadliest attack on the British Army since the Warrenpoint ambush.

The security forces sealed off the area around the wrecked vehicle and spent several hours searching for possible further bombs before removing the bodies. Helicopters and a spotter plane scoured the countryside for the IRA unit involved.

The IRA's South Armagh Brigade claimed responsibility for the attack. It said: "British soldiers should realize that the English public and the English politicians do not give a damn about their lives. You are fighting a war which you cannot win". It is believed the attack was meant to mark the ongoing hunger strike of Raymond McCreesh, from nearby Camlough. McCreesh died on hunger strike two days later.

== See also ==
- Chronology of Provisional Irish Republican Army actions (1980–1989)
- Dungannon land mine attack
- Ballygawley land mine attack
- Ballygawley bus bombing
- 1990 Downpatrick roadside bomb
