= Ambush at Drumnakilly =

Ambush

Drumnakilly ambush
- Part of the Troubles and Operation Banner
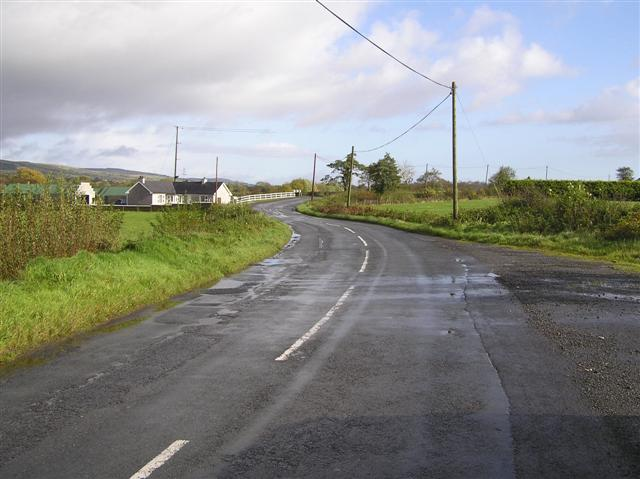
- Drumnakilly, close to where the ambush occurred
Date	30 August 1988
Location	Drumnakilly, County Tyrone; Northern Ireland 54°36′14″N 7°10′08″W
Result	British victory

Belligerents
Provisional IRA	United Kingdom • British Army (SAS)

Commanders and leaders
Gerard Harte	Unknown

Strength
3 volunteers	12 soldiers

Casualties and losses
3 killed	None
- Location of the ambush

The ambush at Drumnakilly was a military confrontation that took place at Drumnakilly in County Tyrone, Northern Ireland on 30 August 1988 during The Troubles, when a detachment of the Provisional IRA (IRA) was ambushed by the British Army.

== Background ==
The ambush occurred ten days after the IRA's East Tyrone Brigade carried out an attack with the Ballygawley bus bombing in Tyrone, which inflicted 36 casualties upon the British Army, including 8 dead.

== The ambush ==
During the late afternoon of 30 August 1988 a three-man active service unit from the Provisional IRA's East Tyrone Brigade consisting of brothers Gerard (29 years old) and Martin Harte (23), and their brother-in-law Brian Mullan (26), attempted to kill an off-duty member of the Ulster Defence Regiment, which IRA intelligence had previously identified for targeting from the regular route, timetable and vehicle of his civilian occupation as the driver of a delivery lorry.

The IRA team drove in a hijacked car to the scene of the planned attack along the Omagh to Carrickmore road near Drumnakilly, looking for the delivery lorry with its distinctive commercial livery travelling along its usual route at that time, wearing boiler suits, balaclavas and armed with two AK-47 rifles and an old MK British Webley revolver. They found the lorry pulled up along the road's 10 miles length, with a man they took to be their target, who appeared to be replacing a flat tyre. As they drove towards him they were suddenly attacked by a British Army detachment of soldiers from the Special Air Service Regiment, which opened automatic fire upon their vehicle from concealed positions about the roadside, killing all three IRA men. Local residents reported hearing several bursts of sustained gun fire during the incident, followed by single shots. Sixteen bullets were subsequently found to have been fired from the IRA weapons in the engagement, with 220 fired from the British Army's weapons. A subsequent coroner's inquest in 1993 failed to establish with certainty which side had opened fire first.

This was the worst loss of life the IRA suffered in Northern Ireland since the Loughgall Ambush a year earlier in May 1987 when an eight-man IRA unit was ambushed and destroyed in similar circumstances.

== Irish Republican songs about the incident ==
Two commemorative songs were written about the incident, one recorded by the Irish Republican folk music group "The Irish Brigade", and another by Gerry Cunningham to commemorate the deaths of the three IRA men involved (which has been adopted by Ógra Shinn Féin at their annual commemoration).
