= Killeeshil ambush =

IRA ambush in County Tyrone, Northern Ireland

- Part of the Troubles and Operation Banner
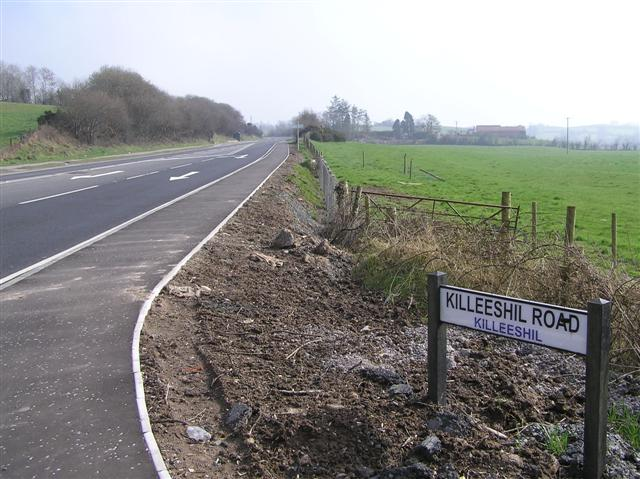
- Killeeshil crossroads, the site of the ambush
Date	15 July 1994
Location	Killeeshil, County Tyrone 54°29′22″N 6°56′20″W
Result	IRA victory

Belligerents
Provisional IRA • East Tyrone Brigade	United Kingdom • RUC

Strength
1 active service unit 1 technical vehicle	1 mobile patrol

Casualties and losses
None	3 wounded 1 vehicle disabled
- 2 civilians wounded
- Location within Northern Ireland

The Killeeshil ambush took place on 15 July 1994, when an armour plated vehicle of the Royal Ulster Constabulary (RUC) was intercepted by a tipper lorry driven by a Provisional IRA active service unit from the East Tyrone Brigade and riddled with automatic rifle fire while travelling on the Dungannon Road at Killeeshil crossroads, in southern County Tyrone, Northern Ireland. Three members of the RUC were wounded, as well as a Sinn Féin councillor from Clones, Republic of Ireland, who by chance had been arrested earlier at the Irish border and was being transferred to Belfast. An elderly female motorist was also wounded. The action occurred a few weeks before the IRA ceasefire of August 1994.

== Background ==
Expectations regarding a Provisional IRA permanent ceasefire were high by mid-1994; that decision would have the potential of moving the political process forward, which could lead to an everlasting peace in the region. The situation on the ground, however, revealed that the IRA was in a state of “high alert”, quizzing the experts on whether the IRA was bracing for a new phase in their military campaign or preparing to end the game from a position of force. The mood was dampened not only by the continuing cycle of violence, but also by the prevalent skepticism among republicans, especially those from Sinn Féin, the political wing of the IRA. The Downing Street Declaration had proved to be incapable of convincing the IRA to stop violence. In east and south County Tyrone meanwhile, the IRA East Tyrone Brigade, after taking heavy casualties in the previous years, was compelled since 1992 to change tactics, relying mostly on barrack buster mortar attacks on British security bases in the region. There were also a number of shootings on security facilities such as at Dungannon (June 1992), Omagh (December 1992), Killymeal (May 1993) or Aughnacloy (May 1994) as well as on RUC/British Army patrols in Cookstown (June 1992) and Pomeroy (August 1992). The most notable of these incidents was a double ambush that took place in Fivemiletown on 12 December 1993, when two RUC constables were killed and a British Army Lynx helicopter shot at in the aftermath.

== Previous incident: Pat Treanor’s arrest ==
On 15 July 1994, Pat Treanor, a farmer and Sinn Féin councillor for Clones, a town near the Irish border between County Monaghan and County Fermanagh, was showing a cross-border road blocked with concrete bollards by the British Army to two Swedish journalists when he was arrested by the RUC. Republican sources claim that Treanor and his guests were caught by a party of three British soldiers and an RUC officer at Lackey Bridge, a border crossing point, approximately at 10:30 p.m. Treanor was taken in custody to Belfast to be questioned about terrorist offenses, while the Swedish journalists were escorted back to the southern side of the border by British troops. The journalists, a reporter and a cameraman, waited for Treanor in vain, and were eventually scared away by British soldiers training their weapons on them.

== IRA ambush ==
Unaware of Treanor's arrest, an IRA team had been in the meantime lurking at Killeeshil crossroads since 8:30 a.m., waiting for information from other units placed along Dungannon Road about any RUC mobile patrol travelling from Ballygawley to Dungannon. The militants held a nearby house overlooking the route for five hours to use it as a base for their attack. Some 15 hours earlier, the IRA had hijacked a tipper lorry at Sixmilecross and adapted it to be use as a technical to ambush a security forces vehicle. Right after midday, the lorry was moved to the roadside of Dungannon Road. Once the RUC vehicle, an armour plated Vauxhall Cavalier, was identified, the lorry overtook the car, while at least two masked IRA men, shielded by the tipper body, opened up with automatic rifles. Up to 20 shots were fired at the RUC vehicle, hitting the Cavalier on the sides and the roof. One of the constables fired back, but scored no hits. One constable was wounded in the back, another in the side and a third in an arm. Pat Treanor was injured in a hand. The driver of the RUC car lost control, and it smashed into a civilian vehicle; a female motorist in her fifties was hurt in her shoulders. The incident also involved other three civilian vehicles; a coach with 50 Scottish tourists aboard, heading for the ferry at Larne, a car driven by two Dutch tourists and another belonging to a locally resident Chinese citizen. All of them were struck by bullets and splinters during the shootout, but there were no further injuries. The IRA men got away unscathed on the tipper lorry. A British Army patrol arrived to the scene shortly after.

== Aftermath ==
The shootout at Killeeshil increased the pessimism and uncertainty about the chances of an IRA ceasefire. The IRA ambush was described as “indiscriminate, foolhardy and mad” by local SDLP councillor Anthony McGonnell, who stressed that “It was an absolute miracle that nobody was murdered”. Two of the RUC constables wounded in the incident were airlifted to Musgrave Park Hospital in Belfast, while the remainder injured were taken to the South Tyrone Hospital at Dungannon. The lorry was abandoned by the IRA unit in a hilly area a few miles away. An RUC statement reports that an improvised grenade launcher and a grenade were found in the follow-up operation. Pat Treanor was released from custody on 21 July 1994, and, on 31 August, he was granted a U.S. visa along with veteran IRA leader Joe Cahill. The same day, a Provisional IRA "permanent" ceasefire came into force at 12:00 p.m.

== See also ==
- 1993 Fivemiletown ambush
- 1990 Lough Neagh ambush
- Chronology of Provisional Irish Republican Army actions (1992–1999)
- Improvised tactical vehicles of the Provisional IRA
