= Drumnakilly =

Village in County Tyrone, Northern Ireland

Coordinates: 54°36′14″N 7°10′08″W

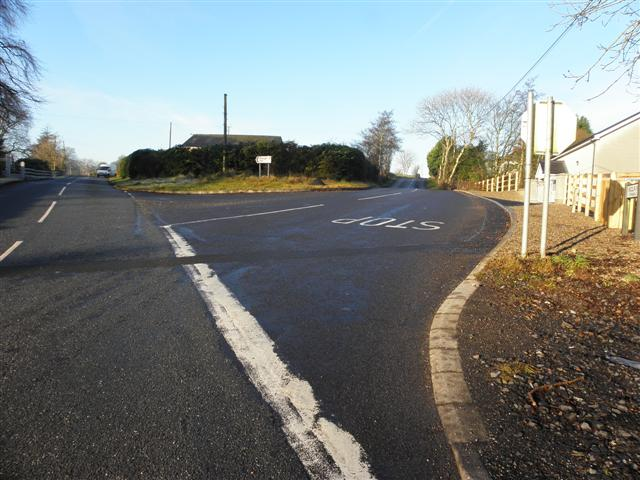
Junction of the main roads in Drumnakilly

Drumnakilly (Irish: Droim na Coille, "Ridge of the Wood").) is a small village and townland between Carrickmore and Omagh in County Tyrone, Northern Ireland. In the 2001 Census it had a population of 114 people. The townland is situated in the historic barony of Strabane Upper and the civil parish of Termonmaguirk and covers an area of 1,352 acres. It lies within the Omagh District Council area.

== History ==
=== The Troubles ===
On 30 August 1988 a Provisional Irish Republican Army (PIRA) detachment was ambushed by the British Army in Drumnakilly whilst attempting to kill an off-duty member of the Ulster Defence Regiment, leading to the deaths of the IRA members.

== Demography ==
The population of the townland declined during the 19th century:

Year	1841	1851	1861	1871	1881	1891
Population	541	415	370	368	381	301
Houses	91	66	62	62	70	61

== See also ==
- List of townlands of County Tyrone
