= Ken Wharton (writer) =

English writer

Ken Wharton (born 21 June 1950) is an English writer and former British soldier who has written a series of non-fictional books on the conflict in Northern Ireland known as the Troubles. The books are based on first-hand accounts by soldiers of all ranks who served in the Operation Banner campaign as well as Wharton's own personal experiences from his two tours of Northern Ireland.

== Early life and military career ==
Born in Leeds, Yorkshire, Wharton, having left school at 15, joined the British Army in 1967 aged 17. He later served in the Royal Green Jackets regiment. He left the army in 1973. Upon leaving the military, he enrolled at the University of Warwick where he studied politics.

== Writing career ==
Wharton's first book A Long Long War: Voices From the British Army in Northern Ireland, 1969–1998 was published in April 2008. Receiving favourable reviews from critics and described as "compelling", Wharton's books feature narratives of ambushes, bombings and shootings that, according to a journalist from The Express, "capture the brutality of the conflict". Wharton conducted interviews with veterans to recount the personal stories which are told from the British soldier's perspective of the military campaign which was the longest the British Army ever waged, and saw the loss of over 700 personnel. Wharton has identified over 1,300 military men and women who died in or as a consequence of the Troubles.

Wharton's decision to write the collection of books stems in part from his anger at what he perceives to be the poor treatment meted out to his former comrades as a "forgotten army" and an overwhelming desire to tell their stories. He was told by Helion Books (publishers for most of his works) that he was one of the company's authors.

== Family ==
A father of seven, Wharton currently resides in Australia.

== Bibliography ==
- A Long Long War: Voices from the British Army in Northern Ireland, 1969–1998. Helion and Company. (2008)
- Bullets, Bombs and Cups of Tea: Further Voices of the British Army in Northern Ireland, 1969–98. Helion and Company. (2009)
- Bloody Belfast: An Oral History of the British Army's War Against the IRA. The History Press. (2010)
- The Bloodiest Year 1972: British Soldiers in Northern Ireland, in their Own Words. The History Press. (2011)
- Sir, They're Taking the Kids Indoors: The British Army in Northern Ireland, 1973–74. Helion and Company. (2012)
- Wasted Years, Wasted Lives: Vol 1 The Troubles 1975–77. Helion and Company (2013)
- Wasted Years, Wasted Lives: Vol 2 The Troubles 1978–79. Helion and Company (2014)
- Northern Ireland: An Agony Continued. The British Army and the Troubles 1980–83. Helion and Company (2015)
- Another Bloody Chapter in an Endless Civil War Volume 1. Northern Ireland and the Troubles 1984–87. Helion and Company (2016)
- Another Bloody Chapter in an Endless Civil War Volume 2. Northern Ireland and the Troubles 1988–90. Helion and Company (2018)
- Torn Apart: 50 Years of the Troubles, 1969-2019. The History Press (2018/2019)
- Blood and Broken Glass: the troubles and the countdown to peace: 1991-93. Helion Books (2019)
- To a Dark Place: Experiences from Survivors of the Troubles. The History Press (2022)
