= List of IRA ambushes of the Irish War of Independence =

This is a list of ambushes carried out by the Irish Republican Army against "Crown Forces" during the Irish War of Independence (1919–1921).

Ambush	Date	Target	IRA strength	British strength	IRA losses	British losses
Soloheadbeg ambush	21 January 1919	Royal Irish Constabulary (RIC)	10 volunteers	2 constables (James McDonnell and Patrick O'Connell)	None	McDonnell and O'Connell were both killed
Holywell Ambush	2 August 1920	British Army	20 volunteers	12–20 soldiers	1 wounded	3–10 wounded
Rineen ambush	22 September 1920	RIC; British Army	50 volunteers	10 lorries of British troops	2 wounded	6 killed 7 wounded
Tooreen ambush	22 October 1920	British Army	30 volunteers	2 lorries of British troops	None	3 killed 4 wounded 6 captured
Piltown Cross ambush	1 November 1920	RIC	N/A	20 constables	N/A	2 killed 6 wounded
Kilmichael Ambush	28 November 1920	Auxiliary Division (ADRIC)	36 volunteers	18 constables	3 killed	16 killed 1 wounded
Pickardstown ambush	6 January 1921	RIC (Black and Tans); British Army	50 volunteers	40 personnel	2 killed 2 wounded	2 wounded
Clonfin ambush	2 February 1921	ADRIC	21 volunteers	19 constables	None	4 killed 8 wounded
Dromkeen ambush	3 February 1921	RIC	40–50 volunteers	13 police constables	1 wounded	11 killed
Upton train ambush	15 February 1921	British Army	13 volunteers	50 soldiers	3 killed 2 wounded	6 wounded
Coolavokig ambush	25 February 1921	ADRIC	62 volunteers	70 constables	None	3 killed
Sheemore ambush	4 March 1921	British Army; RIC	7 volunteers	Unknown	None	1 killed 6 wounded
Clonbanin ambush	5 March 1921	British Army	100 volunteers	40 soldiers	None	13 killed 4–15 wounded
Burgery ambush	18–19 March 1921	RIC	20 volunteers	14, later 50 constables	2 killed	2 killed 2 captured
Crossbarry Ambush	19 March 1921	British Army; ADRIC	104 volunteers	1,200 soldiers 120 Auxiliaries	3-6 killed	10 killed 5 wounded
Headford Ambush	21 March 1921	British Army	32 volunteers	30 soldiers	2 killed	9 killed (British sources); 25 killed (IRA sources)
Scramoge ambush	23 March 1921	British Army; RIC	39	9	None	4 killed 2 captured later killed
Tourmakeady ambush	3 May 1921	RIC (Black and Tans); British Army	60 volunteers	120 constables 600 soldiers	1 killed 1 wounded	4 killed 1 wounded
Kilmeena ambush	19 May 1921	RIC (Black and Tans)	41 volunteers	20–30 constables	4 killed 7 wounded	3 killed
Carrowkennedy ambush	2 June 1921	RIC (Black and Tans)	45–50	23	None	8 killed 16 captured
Rathcoole ambush	16 June 1921	ADRIC	140	25	None	2 killed 14 wounded

== Bibliography ==
- Hart, Peter, ed. (2009). Rebel Cork's Fighting Story, 1916–21: Told by the Men Who Made It. Mercier Press. ISBN 978-1-85635-644-2.
- Kautt, William H. (2010). Ambushes and Armour: The Irish Rebellion 1919–1921. Dublin: Irish Academic Press. ISBN 978-0-7165-3025-1.
- O'Brien, Paddy (2009). O'Reilly, Terence (ed.). Our Struggle for Independence: Eye-witness Accounts from the Pages of 'An Cosantóir'. Mercier Press. ISBN 978-1-85635-614-5.
- O'Brien, Paul (2017). Havoc: The Auxiliaries in Ireland's War of Independence. Cork: The Collins Press. ISBN 978-1-84889-306-1.
- O'Halpin, Eunan; Ó Corráin, Daithí (2020). The Dead of the Irish Revolution. Yale University Press. ISBN 978-0-300-25747-2.
