= Ballygawley land mine attack =

1983 IRA attack in Northern Ireland

- Part of the Troubles and Operation Banner
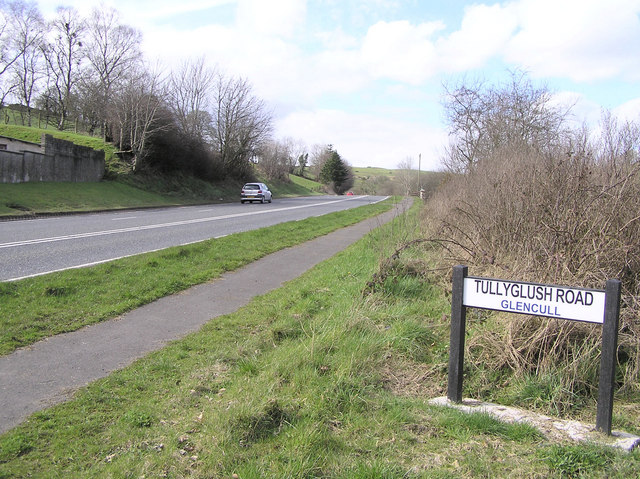
- The approximate site of the attack (2006)

- Location: 54°31′42″N 7°12′39″W; Near Ballygawley, County Tyrone, Northern Ireland
- Date: 13 July 1983
- Target: Ulster Defence Regiment personnel
- Attack type: Improvised land mine
- Deaths: 4 soldiers
- Perpetrator: Provisional IRA

In the Ballygawley land mine attack of 13 July 1983, four soldiers of the British Army's Ulster Defence Regiment (UDR) were killed by a Provisional Irish Republican Army (IRA) land mine near Ballygawley in County Tyrone, Northern Ireland. The soldiers were travelling in a convoy of armoured vehicles when the land mine was detonated remotely.

== Background ==
Since 1970, the IRA had been waging a guerrilla campaign against the British security forces in Northern Ireland. The IRA's East Tyrone Brigade was particularly active. The Irish Times reported: "This stretch of road has been a favourite ambush spot for successive generations of IRA men since the 1920s. [...] In March 1973 a British Army lieutenant was killed when his armoured car was blown up by a similar 500 lb landmine along the same road". In February 1983 the IRA shot dead an off-duty UDR soldier in Ballygawley.

== Attack ==
On the morning of 13 July 1983, soldiers of the 6th Battalion UDR were travelling in a convoy of five armoured Land Rovers from St Lucia Barracks, Omagh to Ballykinler Barracks for a training exercise. As the convoy was about to begin the long descent down Ballymacilroy Hill into Ballygawley, a 600-pound (270 kg) land mine exploded under the last vehicle. It had been planted in a culvert underneath the road and detonated remotely. The blast threw the vehicle into the air and gouged a large crater in the road. Three soldiers were killed outright and a fourth died later in hospital. The soldiers killed were Ronald Alexander (19), Thomas Harron (25), John Roxborough (19), and Oswell Neely (20), all Protestants from Northern Ireland.

Two men received life sentences for the attack and for the killing of RUC officer Paul Clarke in Carrickmore four months later. In 1988, the IRA killed eight British soldiers in a bomb attack along the same road, in the Ballygawley bus bombing.

== See also ==
- Chronology of Provisional Irish Republican Army actions (1980–1989)
- Dungannon land mine attack
- Altnaveigh landmine attack
- Warrenpoint ambush
- Ballygawley bus bombing
- 1990 Downpatrick roadside bomb
