= 1993 Fivemiletown ambush =

IRA ambush in County Tyrone, Northern Ireland

- Part of the Troubles and Operation Banner
- A British soldier watching the scene of the ambush
Date	12 December 1993
Location	Fivemiletown, County Tyrone; Northern Ireland 54°22′39.62″N 7°19′00″W
Result	IRA victory

Belligerents
Provisional IRA • East Tyrone Brigade	United Kingdom • RUC • British Army

Strength
2 active service units	1 RUC mobile patrol 1 British Army helicopter

Casualties and losses
None	2 constables killed
- Location within Northern Ireland

On 12 December 1993, a unit of the Provisional Irish Republican Army's (IRA) East Tyrone Brigade ambushed a two-men unmarked mobile patrol of the RUC in Fivemiletown, County Tyrone. Two constables (Andrew Beacom and Ernest Smith) were shot and killed instantly. A military helicopter was also fired at by a second IRA unit in the aftermath of the incident, during a follow-up operation launched in the surroundings of the town by both the British Army and the RUC. A number of suspects were questioned, but the perpetrators escaped. The action occurred just three days before the Downing Street Declaration.

== Previous incidents in the region ==
Fivemiletown lies in the western edge of the Clogher Valley, near the border between County Fermanagh and County Tyrone. No deaths directly related with paramilitary activity had occurred there during The Troubles before the 1993 IRA shootings, though there were a number of incidents in the region in the previous months.

On 7 May 1992, members of the IRA South Fermanagh Brigade detonated a 1,000 pounds (450 kg) bomb delivered by a tractor after crossing through a hedge outside the local RUC part-time barracks. The huge explosion left ten civilians wounded, and caused widespread damage to the surrounding property. The security base itself was heavily damaged, and the blast was heard from 30 miles away. According to a later IRA statement, the destruction of the security base compelled the British forces to organise their patrols from the nearby RUC barracks at Clogher, allowing the East Tyrone Brigade to study their pattern and carry out the 1993 ambush on Fivemiletown's main street.

A secondary incident occurred some hours later, on 9 May, when a British soldier killed his company's sergeant major in a blue-on-blue shooting at the same place, while taking part in a security detail around the wrecked facilities.

On 20 January 1993 the RUC base in Clogher was hit and severely damaged by a Mark-15 “barrack-buster” mortar bomb launched by the IRA's East Tyrone Brigade. A number of constables received minor injuries.

== IRA ambush and search operation ==
Constable Andrew Beacom and Reserve Constable Ernest Smith were patrolling Fivemiletown's Main Street in a civilian-type, unmarked Renault 21 in the early hours of 12 December 1993. Both men were part of the RUC Operational Support Unit, which surveilled the border along with the British Army. The constables were based at Clogher RUC barracks.

The IRA reported that two active service units from the East Tyrone Brigade had taken up positions in the centre of Fivemiletown and identified the RUC unmarked vehicle before the ambush.

At 1:30 am, up to the junction of Main Street and Coneen Street, at least two IRA volunteers, opened fire from both sides of the road with automatic weapons, hitting the vehicle with more than 20 rounds. Beacom and Smith died on the spot. Constable Beacom lived in Fivemiletown, just a hundred metres from the site of the ambush, where his wife owned a restaurant. She was one of the first persons to arrive to the scene of the shooting. Smith resided with his family at Augher.

According to a colleague in the Operational Support Unit, himself a reserve constable deployed at Linaskea and a former UDR soldier, their deaths “hit the unit very hard”. The men were appreciated for their in-depth knowledge of the area.

A “major” follow-up security operation was mounted between Fivemiletown and the border with the Republic of Ireland, supported by airborne troops and RUC reinforcements, in an attempt to block the attackers' getaway.

Approximately an hour after the ambush, an Army Air Corps Lynx helicopter came upon a number of IRA volunteers in the search area, just a few miles from the site of the shooting, but the aircraft became the target of automatic rifle fire and was forced to disengage. Though the helicopter wasn't hit, the assailants broke contact successfully. The IRA East Tyrone Brigade report claims that the attack on the Lynx was carried out by a second active service unit, which set up a firing position on the predicted path of the British helicopters carrying reinforcements into Fivemiletown after the initial shooting. A number of people was arrested and questioned about the killings, but the perpetrators managed to slip away.

== Aftermath ==
The shootings were widely condemned. RUC Chief Constable Sir Hugh Annesley said that “At a time when the whole community is looking toward peace, the Provisional IRA has yet again shown they have absolutely nothing to offer but deaths and suffering. ”

Presbyterian Moderator Rev. Andrew Rodgers called on the governments to break any contact with Sinn Féin and other “men of blood in both sections of the community.”

A former IRA member cited instead the answer of an IRA volunteer in the area when questioned by him about the futility of the actions at Fivemiletown. He replied that “The war must go on”.

The ambush and killing of the two constables at Fivemiletown was mentioned by Member of Parliament Ken Maginnis and Prime Minister John Major during the latter's speech to the House of Commons right after the joint Downing Street Declaration with Albert Reynolds, the Irish Taoiseach, that set the basis of the Northern Ireland peace process, on 15 December 1993, just three days after the attack.

== See also ==
- Killeeshil ambush
- 1990 Lough Neagh ambush
- Chronology of Provisional Irish Republican Army actions (1992–1999)
- List of Irish republican ambushes
- List of attacks on British aircraft during The Troubles
