= Dungannon land mine attack =

1979 action by the Provisional IRA

- Part of the Troubles and Operation Banner
Date	16 December 1979
Location	Near Dungannon, County Tyrone, Northern Ireland 54.50°N 6.77°W
Result	Provisional IRA victory

Belligerents
Provisional IRA	British Army

Units involved
East Tyrone Brigade	16th Regiment Royal Artillery

Strength
Unknown	1 mobile patrol

Casualties and losses
None	4 killed, 1 vehicle destroyed
- Location within Northern Ireland

In the Dungannon land mine attack of 16 December 1979, the Provisional Irish Republican Army (IRA) ambushed two British Army Land Rovers with an improvised land mine outside Dungannon, County Tyrone, Northern Ireland. Four British soldiers were killed in the attack.

== Background ==
Since the beginning of its campaign in 1970, the Provisional IRA had carried out many improvised landmine and roadside bomb attacks on British forces in the region. In September 1972, three British soldiers were killed when their armoured vehicle was blown up by an IRA land mine at Sanaghanroe, near Dungannon. In March 1974, two IRA members were killed on the Aughnacloy Road near Dungannon when the landmine they were planting exploded prematurely.

On 27 August 1979, the IRA killed 18 British soldiers with roadside bombs in the Warrenpoint ambush in south County Down; the deadliest attack on British troops during the conflict.

== Attack ==
On 16 December 1979, two armoured British Army Land Rovers were driving along Ballygawley Road, about two miles outside Dungannon. A unit of the IRA had planted a 600–1,000-pound (270–450 kg) improvised landmine in a culvert under the road at Glenadush. When the second vehicle reached the culvert, the landmine was detonated by remote control. It blew the vehicle into the air and killed four soldiers from the Royal Regiment of Artillery outright: William Beck (23), Keith Richards (22), Simon Evans (19), and Allan Ayrton (23).

== See also ==
- Chronology of Provisional Irish Republican Army actions (1970–79)
- Ballygawley bus bombing
- Ballygawley land mine attack
- Altnaveigh landmine attack
- 1990 Downpatrick roadside bomb
