= 1990 Lough Neagh ambush =

Killing of four men by the Provisional IRA

- Part of The Troubles and Operation Banner
- Scene of the shooting, 11 November 1990

- Location: 54°30′19.3″N 6°20′28.64″W; Castor Bay near Morrows Point, Lough Neagh, County Armagh, Northern Ireland
- Date: 10 November 1990; 7:30-8:00AM (GMT)
- Target: Off-duty RUC officers
- Attack type: Shooting
- Deaths: 2 Royal Ulster Constabulary officers 1 former UDR soldier 1 civilian
- Injuries: 0
- Perpetrator: Provisional IRA

The 1990 Lough Neagh ambush was a gun attack carried out by the Provisional IRA on 10 November 1990 at Castor Bay, near Morrows Point, Lough Neagh, County Armagh, Northern Ireland targeting members of the security forces involved in a waterfowl hunting trip with other two men at the time. An active service unit of the IRA's North Armagh Brigade shot dead a Royal Ulster Constabulary (RUC) Inspector, an RUC Reservist, a former Ulster Defence Regiment (UDR) soldier and one civilian. Some members of the wildfowling party struggled with their attackers, and one of the constables returned fire before being killed.

== Background ==
On 7 September 1990 UDR soldier Colin McCullough was shot dead by the IRA while in the company of his girlfriend at Oxford Island on the shore of Lough Neagh in the same area as the 10 November ambush. On 6 October, in a revenge attack, the "Protestant Action Force" (a cover name for the Ulster Volunteer Force) shot dead Catholic man Denis Carville at the same location, also while sitting in his car with his girlfriend.

== Shooting ==
At 7:30 AM on 10 November 1990, the four men left home for Castor Bay on the shore of Lough Neagh for a wildfowling trip. Their early morning hunting excursions to the Department of the Environment-managed waterworks compound were routine and all of the men lived in the Lurgan and Waringstown areas. It is believed the IRA team were waiting for the group inside the compound and ambushed them shortly following their arrival.

The victims were David Murphy, an RUC Special Branch Inspector; Thomas Taylor, a part-time RUC Reservist; Norman Kendall, an electrician and former UDR soldier; and Keith Dowey, an employee with the Department of the Environment water service and father of two young children.

According to a 2000 report, the goal of the IRA unit, apparently members of the North Armagh Brigade led by the late Patsy Haughian, was only to abduct and interrogate Murphy about collusion between the RUC and loyalist militants, but things went wrong when Kendall and Dowey arrived to the scene in a car. Dowey, the driver, was shot and killed instantly, but there is evidence that Kendall put up some resistance before being slain. Taylor produced his personal weapon and shot at the assailants, but was cut down by a hail of fire. Murphy struggled and managed to avoid being bundled into the vehicle, but was eventually killed by Haughian. After the hunting party failed to appear at lunch time the alarm was raised; it was initially feared they had been kidnapped but four bodies were accounted for. The gunmen escaped in one of the victim's cars which was later found partially burnt out at Brownlow Terrace, Lurgan. The IRA unit then hid in a house on the shores of the lake before returning to Lurgan the morning after.

== Aftermath ==
The attack was widely condemned by politicians in Northern Ireland and the Republic of Ireland. Unionist politicians called for tougher security measures; local Ulster Unionist MP David Trimble criticised Secretary of State Peter Brooke for ruling out the introduction of internment without trial in response to the incident and other killings in the preceding weeks and linked the attack to a landmark speech given by Brooke the previous day signalling to the Provisional IRA and Sinn Féin that Britain had no "selfish strategic or economic interest" in Northern Ireland. RUC Chief Constable Hugh Annesley visited the scene of the shootings and described the attack as "repulsive, futile and cowardly murder" and said "it is important to say yet again that the terrorists have no mandate from either Protestant or Catholic, north or south of the Irish border for such atrocities."

Social Democratic and Labour Party representative Bríd Rodgers categorised the killings as part of an ongoing cycle of so-called "tit-for-tat" murders and urged anyone with information to contact the police. A message was read at Mass in Lurgan following the attack from the Bishop of Dromore and local priests warning Catholics to take precautions for their safety because of the risk of revenge attacks by Loyalists.

The alleged leader of the IRA squad, Patsy Haughian, died of cancer at age 38 in October 2000. He was never formally accused of the killings.

== See also ==
- Chronology of Provisional Irish Republican Army actions (1990–99)
- 1989 Jonesborough ambush
- 1993 Fivemiletown ambush
