= Warrenpoint ambush =

1979 IRA attack on British forces

- Part of The Troubles and Operation Banner
- A British Army vehicle destroyed in the ambush. The hills of the Cooley Peninsula in County Louth can be seen in the background, behind Narrow Water Castle.
Date	27 August 1979
Location	Narrow Water Castle near Warrenpoint, County Down, Northern Ireland 54°06′42″N 06°16′45″W
Result	Provisional IRA victory; Deadliest attack on the British Army by the Provisional IRA

Belligerents
United Kingdom	Provisional IRA

Commanders and leaders
Lt Col David Blair †; Maj. Peter Fursman †	Brendan Burns

Units involved
British Army	South Armagh Brigade

Strength
50 soldiers	Unknown

Casualties and losses
18 killed; Over 20 wounded; 1 RAF Wessex helicopter damaged	None
- Civilian: 1 killed, 1 wounded by British Army gunfire
- Location within Northern Ireland

On 27 August 1979, the South Armagh Brigade of the Provisional Irish Republican Army (Provisional IRA) ambushed a British Army convoy with two large roadside bombs at Narrow Water Castle outside Warrenpoint, Northern Ireland. The first bomb was aimed at the convoy itself, and the second targeted the incoming reinforcements and the command point set up to deal with the incident. Provisional IRA volunteers hidden in nearby woodland also allegedly fired on the troops, who returned fire. The Narrow Water Castle is on the banks of the Newry River, which marks the border between Northern Ireland and the Republic of Ireland.

Eighteen British soldiers were killed and over twenty were seriously injured, making it the deadliest attack on the British Army during the Troubles. A British civilian was also killed and an Irish civilian wounded, both by British soldiers firing across the border after the first blast. The attack happened on the same day that the Provisional IRA assassinated Lord Louis Mountbatten, a retired British statesman and close relative of the British royal family.

== Ambush ==
The ambush took place on the A2 road at Narrow Water Castle, just outside Warrenpoint, in the south of County Down in Northern Ireland. The road and castle are on the northern bank of the Newry River (also known as the Clanrye River), which marks the border between Northern Ireland and the Republic of Ireland. The Republic's side of the river, the Cooley Peninsula in County Louth, was an ideal spot from which to launch an ambush: it was thickly wooded, which gave cover to the ambushers, and the river border prevented British forces giving chase.

=== First explosion ===
On the afternoon of 27 August, a British Army convoy of one Land Rover and two four-tonne vehicles—carrying soldiers of the 2nd Battalion, Parachute Regiment—was driving from Ballykinler Barracks to Newry. The British Army were aware of the dangers of using the stretch of road along the Newry River and often declared it out of bounds. However, they would sometimes use it to avoid setting a pattern. At 16:40, as the convoy was driving past Narrow Water Castle, an 800-pound (360 kg) fertiliser bomb, hidden among strawbales on a parked flatbed trailer, was detonated by remote control by Provisional IRA members watching from across the border in County Louth. The explosion caught the last lorry in the convoy, hurling it on its side and instantly killing six paratroopers, whose bodies were scattered across the road. There were only two survivors amongst the soldiers travelling in the vehicle; they both received serious injuries. The lorry's driver, Anthony Wood, was one of those killed. All that remained of Wood's body was his pelvis, welded to the seat by the fierce heat of the blast.

According to the soldiers, immediately after the blast they were targeted by rifle fire from the woods on the Cooley Peninsula on the other side of the border, and this view was supported by two part-time firefighters assisting the wounded, who were "sure they had been fired on from the Omeath side of the water". Shortly afterwards, two Provisional IRA members were arrested by the Garda Síochána (the Republic of Ireland's police force) and suspected of being behind the ambush, were found to have traces of gunsmoke residue on their hands and on the motorbike they were riding. The Provisional IRA's first statement on the incident, however, denied that any shots had been fired at the troops, and according to Royal Ulster Constabulary (RUC) researchers, the soldiers might have mistaken the sound of ammunition cooking off for enemy gunfire. Nevertheless, at the official inquiry the soldiers declared, on oath, that they had been fired on.

The surviving paratroopers radioed for urgent assistance, and reinforcements were dispatched to the scene by road. A rapid reaction unit was sent by Gazelle helicopter, consisting of Lieutenant-Colonel David Blair, commanding officer of the Queen's Own Highlanders, his signaller Lance Corporal Victor MacLeod, and several army medics. Another helicopter, a Westland Wessex, landed to pick up the wounded. Colonel Blair assumed command upon arriving at the site.

=== Shooting of Hudson cousins ===
William Hudson, a 29-year-old from London, was killed by the British Army and his cousin Barry Hudson, a 25-year-old native of Dingle, was wounded when shots were fired across the Newry River into the Republic of Ireland about 3 km from the village of Omeath, County Louth.

The pair were partners in 'Hudson Amusements' and had been operating their amusements in Omeath for the duration of the Omeath Gala. When the first explosion was heard across the Lough, the pair went down to the shore to see what was unfolding. The pair made their way to Narrow Water on the southern side of the border to get a better view of what was happening on the northern side. Barry Hudson was shot in the arm and as he fell to the ground he saw his cousin, who was the son of a coachman at Buckingham Palace, fall to the ground, shot in the head. He died almost immediately.

=== Second explosion ===
The IRA had been studying how the British Army behaved after a bombing and correctly predicted that they would set up an incident command point at the stone gateway on the other side of the road. At 17:12, thirty-two minutes after the first explosion, another 800-pound (360 kg) bomb hidden in milk pails exploded at the gateway, destroying it and hurling lumps of granite through the air. It detonated as the Wessex helicopter was taking off carrying wounded soldiers. The helicopter was damaged by the blast but did not crash.

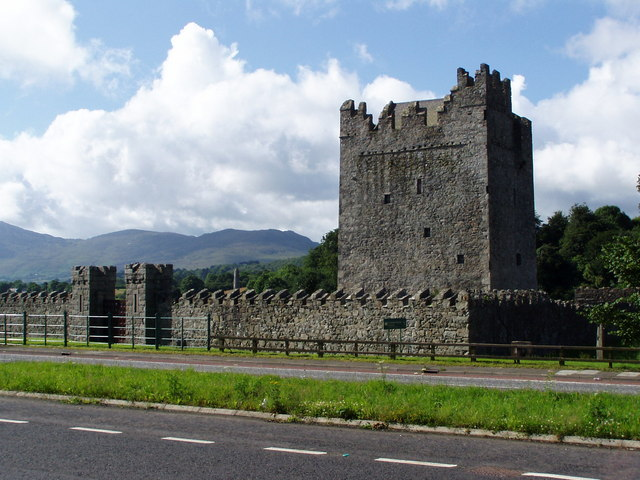
Narrow Water Castle c. 2007

The second explosion killed twelve soldiers: ten from the Parachute Regiment and two from the Queen's Own Highlanders. Lt. Colonel Blair was the second lieutenant colonel to be killed in the Troubles up until then, following Lt. Colonel Corden-Lloyd of the 2nd Battalion Royal Green Jackets in 1978. Only one of Colonel Blair's epaulettes remained to identify him as his body had been destroyed in the blast. The epaulette was taken from the scene by Brigadier David Thorne to a security briefing with prime minister Margaret Thatcher to "illustrate the human factor" of the attack. Mike Jackson, then a major in the Parachute Regiment, was at the scene soon after the second explosion and later described seeing human remains scattered over the road, in the water and hanging from the trees. He was asked to identify the face of his friend, Major Peter Fursman, still recognisable after it had been ripped from his head by the explosion and recovered from the water by divers from the Royal Engineers.

Press photographer Peter Molloy, who arrived at the scene after the first explosion, came close to being shot by an angry paratrooper who saw him taking photographs of the dead and dying instead of offering to help the wounded. The soldier was tackled by his comrades. Molloy said, "I was shouted at and called all sorts of things but I understood why. I had trespassed on the worst day of these fellas' lives and taken pictures of it."

== Aftermath ==
The Warrenpoint ambush was the deadliest attack on the British Army during the Troubles and the Parachute Regiment's biggest loss since World War II, with sixteen paratroopers killed. General Sir James Glover, Commander of British forces in Northern Ireland, later said it was "arguably the most successful and certainly one of the best planned IRA attacks of the whole campaign". The ambush happened on the same day that Lord Mountbatten, a prominent relative and close confidant of the British royal family, was assassinated by an IRA bomb aboard his boat at Mullaghmore, along with three others.

Republicans portrayed the attack as retaliation for Bloody Sunday in 1972 when the Parachute Regiment shot dead 13 unarmed civilians during a protest march in Derry. Graffiti appeared in republican areas declaring "13 gone and not forgotten, we got 18 and Mountbatten". The day after the Mountbatten and Warrenpoint attacks, the Ulster Volunteer Force retaliated by shooting dead John Patrick Hardy (43), a Catholic civilian, at his home in Belfast's New Lodge estate. Hardy was allegedly targeted due to the mistaken belief that he was an IRA member.

Very shortly after the ambush, Provisional IRA volunteers Brendan Burns and Joe Brennan were arrested by the Gardaí. They were stopped while riding a motorbike on a road opposite Narrow Water Castle. They were later released on bail due to lack of evidence. Burns died in 1988 when a bomb he was handling exploded prematurely. In 1998, former Provisional IRA member Eamon Collins claimed that Burns had been one of those who carried out the Warrenpoint ambush. No one has ever been criminally charged.

According to Toby Harnden, the attack "drove a wedge" between the British Army and the RUC. Lieutenant-General Sir Timothy Creasey, General Officer Commanding Northern Ireland, suggested to Margaret Thatcher that internment should be brought back and that liaison with the Gardaí should be left in the hands of the military. Sir Kenneth Newman, the RUC Chief Constable, claimed instead that the British Army practice, since 1975, of supplying their garrisons in South County Armagh by helicopter gave too much freedom of movement to the Provisional IRA. One result was the appointment of Sir Maurice Oldfield to a new position of Coordinator of Security Intelligence in Northern Ireland. His role was to coordinate intelligence between the military, MI5 and the RUC. Another was the expansion of the RUC by 1,000 members. Tim Pat Coogan asserts that the deaths of the 18 soldiers hastened the move towards Ulsterisation.

Soldiers killed at the Warrenpoint ambush on 27 August 1979
Rank	Age	Name	Unit
Lieutenant-Colonel	40	David Blair	The Queen's Own Highlanders
Major	35	Peter Fursman	2nd Battalion, Parachute Regiment
Lance Corporal	24	Victor MacLeod	The Queen's Own Highlanders
Lance Corporal	25	Christopher G. Ireland	2nd Battalion, Parachute Regiment
Sergeant	31	Ian A. Rogers	2nd Battalion, Parachute Regiment
Sergeant	33	Walter Beard	2nd Battalion, Parachute Regiment
Private	18	Jeffrey Jones	2nd Battalion, Parachute Regiment
Private	18	Gary I. Barnes	2nd Battalion, Parachute Regiment
Private	19	Anthony Wood	2nd Battalion, Parachute Regiment
Private	22	John Giles	2nd Battalion, Parachute Regiment
Private	26	Leonard Jones	2nd Battalion, Parachute Regiment
Private	18	Robert Jones	2nd Battalion, Parachute Regiment
Private	23	Donald Blair	2nd Battalion, Parachute Regiment
Private	24	Nicholas Andrew	2nd Battalion, Parachute Regiment
Private	20	Raymond Dunn	2nd Battalion, Parachute Regiment
Private	18	Michael Woods	2nd Battalion, Parachute Regiment
Private	23	Thomas Vance	2nd Battalion, Parachute Regiment
Private	23	Robert England	2nd Battalion, Parachute Regiment

Lieutenant-Colonel Blair is remembered on a memorial at Radley College, Oxfordshire.
