= Killing of Majella O'Hare =

Irish schoolgirl shot by a British Paratrooper

Majella O'Hare
- Born: 23 April 1964; Ballymoyer, County Armagh, Northern Ireland
- Died: 14 August 1976 (aged 12); Whitecross, County Armagh, Northern Ireland
- Cause of death: Gunshot wounds
- Known for: Being killed by a British soldier

Majella O'Hare (23 April 1964 – 14 August 1976) was a 12-year-old schoolgirl who was shot in the back by a British paratrooper, Pvt. Michael Williams, while walking to morning confessions in Whitecross, County Armagh, Northern Ireland, in August 1976.

== Background ==
Majella O'Hare was born on 23 April 1964 in Ballymoyer, County Armagh to Mary and James “Jim” O'Hare, who was a groundsman at a local school. She was the youngest of five children, her siblings were Marie, Annie, Margarita "Mags" and Michael O'Hare.

== Killing ==
In the months leading up to her death on 4 January 1976, three members of the Reavey family were murdered at their home in Whitecross by the Ulster Volunteer Force in the Reavey and O'Dowd killings. The next day members of the Provisional Irish Republican Army murdered ten protestant civilians in Kingsmill a village near Whitecross in the Kingsmill massacre.

On 14 August 1976, Majella O'Hare, along with some friends, were on their way to confession at St. Malachy's church in Whitecross. At 11:53 a.m. just after the group passed a security checkpoint, a paratrooper of the 3rd Battalion, Parachute Regiment, Pvt. Michael Williams fired four or five times, hitting her twice in the back just above the waist with a general-purpose machine gun, from around 20 to 30 yards (18 to 27 m) away. Williams claimed he spotted a gunman in a nearby hedge and that he had shouted a warning before shooting.

Majella's father Jim (56) and her brother Michael O'Hare (25) were allegedly harassed by the paratroopers while they were attempting to give aid to Majella. As Jim ran down the road a paratrooper told him to “Stay where you are, mate.” Jim ignored the paratrooper then picked up Majella and cradled her in his arms. He was speaking with a paratrooper applying field dressings who told him to “Shut up.” Jim told him that this was his daughter, but paratrooper replied “I don’t give two fucks who she is, take your fucking hands off her.” Then Alice Campbell, a local nurse, who had heard someone shouting that a little girl had been shot said, “Let me down to her.” A paratrooper shouted at her to “Stay where you are.” She ignored him and got a jacket from one of Majella’s friends and wrapped it around her. Campbell would later say that the paratroopers were very aggressive. Alice Campbell later Devlin was in a nearby graveyard putting flowers on the grave of her late fiancé, John Reavey who was killed earlier that year in January, along with two other members of his family.

After a little while a helicopter came to airlift Majella. Majella was thrown in on her injured side and her father Jim was also then shoved into the helicopter with Majella. Jim would perform CPR on Majella but was allegedly forced to stop. The helicopter landed at Daisy Hill Hospital in Newry, and she was pronounced dead on arrival, having died in the helicopter on the way there.

== Trial ==
Williams was initially charged with murder by the Royal Ulster Constabulary, but this was later reduced to the lesser charge of manslaughter. In 1977, during his trial, Williams claimed in his defence that a IRA sniper had shot at him, and that Majella had been caught in the cross fire, although there was no evidence to corroborate this claim, and the RUC said they didn’t believe there was an IRA presence at the time. Nevertheless, he was acquitted of manslaughter by the judge, Maurice Gibson, sitting alone without a jury in a Diplock court. In 1987 Gibson was later assassinated in a car bombing.

== Legacy ==
One of Majella O'Hare’s friends who was present at the shooting Caroline Murphy who was 8 at the time of the shooting wrote a poem shortly after O'Hare’s death. The poem read,

On an August morn of '76

The sun shone bright and gay,

We planned how best to spend the days

On the beach at Gyles Quay.

As we shipped along towards the Church

Our little sins to tell,

A shot rang out from a British gun,

To the ground Majella fell.

The little children screamed in fright,

Her father ran in haste,

But the colour faded from her cheeks

And the blood poured from her waist.

The 'Hell' came and carried her

High into the sky,

All I could do was watch and cry:

"Why, dear God, Why?'

A flower-decked altar marks the spot,

Along the road today,

Where her broken-hearted parents

Brother and sisters kneel to pray.

They pray to God to give them strength

To bear their heavy cross

And keep alive within their hearts

The loving girl they lost.

No more T'il hear Majella call:

"Caroline, coming to play."

Or go for walks with Prince and Breck.

Down the road or up the Brae.

But I know she is an Angel fair

In God's Kingdom in the sky

And hope she prays that all her friends

Will join her bye and bye.

She wouldn't change her place for mine

Or the richest man by far,

For she has seen

Our Lady's face

Brighter than a star

In September 1976 two priests, Fr. Denis Faul and Fr. Raymond Murra published a book titled Majella O'Hare, which documented many of the details of O'Hare’s killing.

On 28 March 2011 Owen Patterson the then secretary of Northern Ireland issued an apology to the O'Hare family for the killing of Majella. Owen Patterson issued the apology by letter to O'Hare’s mother Mary, the letter read, “I apologise for Majella's death and offer you my heartfelt sympathy. Although many years have passed, I have no doubt that your grief and that of your family has not diminished … both the initial investigation by the RUC and the more recent review have concluded that it was unlikely that there was a gunman in the area when the soldier involved opened fire and struck Majella, as he claimed. The soldier's actions resulted in the loss of a young and innocent life, causing sorrow and anguish for those who knew and loved Majella. On behalf of the Army and the Government, I am profoundly sorry that this tragic incident should have happened.” The letter was signed by Liam Fox who was the then Defence Secretary of the Ministry of Defence.

Majella's parents Jim died in 1994 at around 74 years old, and her mother Mary died on 13 May 2019, she was in her 90s, and her funeral was on 16 May 2019. Labour MP, Conor McGinn, who was also a family friend of the O'Hares, gave a statement shortly after her death “I am so sorry to hear about the death of Mrs Mary O'Hare from Whitecross. She was a woman of kindness, integrity and most of all a great family friend. Mrs O'Hare and her family suffered the awful injustice of her daughter Majella’s killing; she was 12 years old when a soldier shot her in the back while she was on her way to the local church. I was proud to play a small part in getting the Government to apologise for the wrong inflicted on Mrs O'Hare and her family. I also want to pay tribute to another Whitecross man Eugene Reavey, who still seeks justice for his three brothers who were killed by the Glennane gang. The Reaveys deserve the truth and I will support them in seeking it. The Reavey and O'Hare families never strayed from the path of dignity, faith and compassion. I cannot adequately articulate how much admiration I have for them. To Mrs O'Hare’s son Michael – my good friend – and the wider family, I can faithfully say that ‘Ma’ was what I call a ‘quiet leader’.”
