= Robert McConnell (loyalist) =

Ulster loyalist paramilitary

- Robert McConnell
- Born: Robert William McConnell c. 1944; Northern Ireland
- Died: 5 April 1976 (aged 31–32); Tullyvallen, Newtownhamilton, County Armagh
- Military career
- Allegiance: Ulster Defence Regiment; Ulster Volunteer Force (allegedly)
- Rank: Corporal
- Units: 2nd Battalion UDR; Mid-Ulster Brigade
- Conflict: The Troubles

Robert William McConnell (c. 1944 – 5 April 1976), was an Ulster loyalist paramilitary who allegedly carried out or was an accomplice to a number of sectarian attacks and killings, although he never faced any charges or convictions. McConnell served part-time as a corporal in the 2nd Battalion Ulster Defence Regiment (UDR), and was a suspected member of the Ulster Volunteer Force (UVF).

In 1993, Yorkshire Television broadcast a programme The Hidden Hand: the Forgotten Massacre, and the narrator named McConnell as a member of one of the two UVF bomb teams that perpetrated three car bomb attacks in Dublin on 17 May 1974, which killed 26 people. The programme also linked him to British military intelligence and Captain Robert Nairac, stating that McConnell and key figures from the bombing unit were controlled before and after the bombings by Nairac. RUC Special Patrol Group (SPG) officer John Weir alleged that McConnell had been part of the UVF unit that shot leading Provisional IRA man John Francis Green to death in January 1975. Weir also alleged that McConnell had been one of the gunmen in the Reavey family shootings, as well as having had a key role in the bomb and gun attack against Donnelly's Bar the previous month. These were part of a series of sectarian attacks and killings that were carried out by the group of loyalist extremists known as the Glenanne gang, of which McConnell was a member. This gang comprised rogue elements of the Royal Ulster Constabulary (RUC), the SPG, Ulster Defence Regiment (UDR), and the UVF's Mid-Ulster Brigade, which from 1975 to the early 1990s was commanded by Robin "the Jackal" Jackson. Jackson was also implicated by the Hidden Hand in the Dublin and Monaghan bombings, and he was reportedly involved in the Green assassination.

McConnell was shot to death outside his home by the IRA. Weir maintained in his affidavit that was published in the Barron Report (which was the findings of the official investigation into the 1974 car bombings commissioned by Irish Supreme Court Justice Henry Barron), that McConnell had been set up by British military intelligence. According to Weir, whose information came from a republican informer, now deceased, military intelligence passed on vital information about McConnell to the IRA, who then ordered his killing.

== Bombings and shootings ==
=== Glenanne gang and Dublin car bombings ===
McConnell was born in Northern Ireland in about 1944 and grew up in a Church of Ireland family. He later served as a part-time member of the 2nd Battalion UDR, holding the rank of corporal. This battalion, due to its location and patrol territory in the hazardous South Armagh area known as "bandit country", suffered the highest casualty rate of the entire regiment. The Ulster Defence Regiment (UDR) was the largest infantry regiment in the British Army.

Members of extremist groupings such as the UVF managed to join the UDR despite the vetting process. Their purpose in doing so was to obtain weapons, training and intelligence. Vetting procedures were carried out jointly by Army Intelligence and the RUC's Special Branch and if no intelligence was found to suggest unsuitability individuals were passed for recruitment and would remain as soldiers until the commanding officer was provided with intelligence enabling him to remove soldiers with paramilitary links or sympathies. In the regimental history of the UDR the author commented on men like McConnell and (referring to another individual) suggested that, "he may have regarded himself as a true blue loyalist but had so little understanding of the meaning of loyalty that he would betray his regiment and his comrades....."

He was also a member of the Orange Order's Cladybeg Faith Defenders LOL (Loyal orange lodge) 305b, Newtownhamilton District, and a Sir Knight in the Guiding Star Royal Black Preceptory No.1133; he held the office of Preceptory Lecturer at the time of his death. The Orange Order and Royal Black Preceptory are both Protestant fraternal societies. McConnell attended St. John's Church of Ireland in Newtownhamilton, where he was also a church worker.

At some time prior to 1974, he allegedly joined the UVF's Mid-Ulster Brigade which was led by Billy Hanna until the latter's fatal shooting on 27 July 1975, when the suspected gunman, Robin Jackson, assumed command. According to journalist Toby Harnden, McConnell "was a very senior member in the UVF". The Mid-Ulster Brigade was part of the Glenanne gang, the group of loyalist extremists and rogue members of the security forces who operated from a farm in Glenanne, County Armagh which was owned by RUC reserve officer James Mitchell. The farm was used as a UVF arms dump and bomb-making site. The gang carried out their sectarian attacks against the Catholic nationalist and republican community primarily in the County Armagh and Mid-Ulster area, but also ventured south on several occasions when they hit targets in the Republic. The 1993 Yorkshire Television programme The Hidden Hand: the Forgotten Massacre named McConnell along with UVF brigadier Billy Hanna, Harris Boyle, and "the Jackal" as having planned and carried out the 1974 Dublin car bombings. Three cars containing explosives detonated minutes apart from one another during Friday evening rush hour in the city centre that left 26 people dead and close to 300 wounded. No warnings had been given before the bombs went off; they had been so well constructed that one hundred per cent of each bomb exploded upon detonation. The narrator added that McConnell was controlled before and after the bombings by Military Intelligence Liaison officer Robert Nairac of 14th Intelligence Company. John Weir confirmed that he worked with the Special Air Service and the "intelligence boys". A former friend of McConnell's claimed that British soldiers "used to call at Robert's house for him after he had finished his normal duties and he often crossed the border with them". Former British soldier and psychological warfare operative Major Colin Wallace said he was told in 1974 that McConnell, along with Robin Jackson, was an RUC Special Branch agent. This allegation was confirmed in a letter written by Wallace to a colleague dated 14 August 1975.

=== John Francis Green killing ===
McConnell is named by Weir to have been involved in a gun and bomb attack against a pub in Crossmaglen in November 1974, resulting in the fatal injury of Thomas McNamee. Weir also alleged that he was one of the accomplices in the killing of high-ranking IRA member John Francis Green outside Castleblaney in the Irish Republic on 10 January 1975. Green was shot six times in the head at close range by a group of gunmen who had burst through the front door of the "safe" house where he was staying; the UVF later claimed responsibility for the attack in the June 1975 edition of their journal Combat. Weir claimed that Robert Nairac also took part in Green's shooting with the following statement:

The men who did that shooting were Robert McConnell, Robin Jackson, and I would be almost certain, Harris Boyle who was killed in the Miami attack. What I am absolutely certain of is that Robert McConnell, Robert McConnell knew that area really, really well. Robin Jackson was with him. I was later told that Nairac was with them. I was told by...a UVF man, he was very close to Jackson and operated with him. Jackson told [him] that Nairac was with them.

=== Altnamachin and Silverbridge attacks ===
On 24 August 1975, McConnell was alleged by Weir to have been part of a UVF group that ambushed two Gaelic football supporters at a bogus vehicle checkpoint set up in the Cortamlet Road at the townland of Altnamachin, near Tullyvallen close to the Irish Republic border. At about 11.30 pm, Colm McCartney (aged 22) from Derry and Sean Farmer (aged 32), from Armagh, were returning home from the Derry versus Dublin All-Ireland semi-final football match at Croke Park in Dublin when the group stopped the car they were travelling in. Upon their discovery that the two men inside were Catholics, the UVF gunmen ordered them out of the car and a short distance away turned their guns on Farmer, killing him instantly. McCartney attempted to escape on foot, but his pursuers caught up with him and he was also fatally gunned down. McCartney and Farmer had been shot four times and six times respectively. McConnell was wearing his British Army uniform at the time the attack occurred. A local resident who had been in the vicinity walking his dog saw the stopped vehicle; he then heard the sounds of gunfire, someone running along the road, a male voice shouting "stop, stop", which was then followed by "wild screaming" and another series of gunshots. He also saw another car drive away from the scene afterwards. Less than an hour before the shootings, a three-man RUC patrol in an unmarked car had been stopped by the same UVF unit after one soldier had waved a red torch in a circular motion indicating that it was a military vehicle checkpoint. Another soldier was lying in a ditch with a rifle. The RUC immediately suspected that it was a bogus checkpoint despite the men having worn full military combat uniforms. After the RUC men were passed through the checkpoint, they requested by radio, clarification as to whether there were any authorised regular Army or UDR checkpoints in the area that night, and received the confirmation that there were none. Although the RUC patrol reported the unauthorised checkpoint to the Army and requested their help in investigating the incident, no action had been taken. The killings were claimed by the Protestant Action Force, one of the cover names used by the Glenanne gang. The fake vehicle checkpoint manned UVF men in full British Army uniform was the same modus operandi which the UVF had employed when they waylaid the Miami Showband—a popular Irish cabaret band—the previous month at Buskhill, County Down; however, McConnell was not implicated in that incident.

On 19 December 1975, a car pulled up outside Donnelly's Bar in Silverbridge, County Armagh. Members of the Glenanne gang got out and launched a bomb and machine-gun attack against the pub's patrons, hitting those inside as well as outside the premises. A total of three people were killed, including the proprietor's 14-year-old son, Michael, who was struck in the head by flying shrapnel after one of the gang tossed a bomb inside the pub's interior, shouting: "Happy Christmas, you Fenian bastards". Six other people were seriously injured, including a woman who was shot in the head. Weir named McConnell as having carried out the attack together with RUC SPG Officer Laurence McClure, and several other men. The Pat Finucane Centre commissioned an international panel of inquiry to investigate allegations of collusion between loyalist paramilitaries and the security forces regarding a series of sectarian attacks against the Catholic nationalist and republican community. This panel, headed by Professor Douglass Cassel of Northwestern University School of Law, stated in its report that James Mitchell's housekeeper, Sarah Elizabeth "Lily" Shields, who had provided the gang's getaway car, named McConnell as having been one of the perpetrators. McClure, the driver of the getaway car—a blue Lada—confirmed this. He and Shields had played the part of a "courting couple" inside the car as the attack was being carried out by the other gang members. McClure and Shields were later charged with withholding information in relation to the pub killings. According to Anne Cadwallader in her book Lethal Allies British Collusion in Ireland Shields later admitted to the RUC that she had been McConnell's girlfriend since 1971. Following the attack, McConnell and some of the others then regrouped at the Glenanne farm. James Mitchell later stated that McConnell had been a visitor to his farmhouse that same evening before and after the Silverbridge incident. McClure claimed that he encountered McConnell several days afterwards, and McConnell had allegedly said to McClure: "That was a good job the other night", which McClure had understood to have been an allusion to Silverbridge. The gang claimed the attack using another of their cover names, the Red Hand Commandos. According to Weir's affidavit, the pub was specifically chosen in retaliation for the killing of an RUC reserve constable who it was believed had been detained at Donnelly's Bar subsequent to his kidnapping by the IRA.

=== Reavey family shootings ===
The Glenanne gang carried out a co-ordinated attack against two Catholic families on 4 January 1976 which left a total of five men dead, and one injured. Robert McConnell purportedly led the first masked UVF unit at Whitecross, County Armagh. The gunmen entered the Reavey home by the key which had been accidentally left in the door and opened fire on three brothers who watching television at the time, killing John and Brian outright, and wounding another, Anthony. The other members of the large family had previously gone out leaving the three brothers on their own. The getaway car on this occasion had been driven by James Mitchell with Lily Shields having accompanied him. Twenty minutes later at Ballydougan, another group led by Robin Jackson broke into the O'Dowd home killing three family members. Before succumbing to a brain hemorrhage shortly afterwards on 30 January, 17-year-old Anthony Reavey had given a description of the leading gunman which was said to have fit that of McConnell. The man Anthony Reavey had described was 5"11, aged about 25 or 26, wearing a black woollen balaclava hood, green anorak, and dark trousers; he was carrying a submachine gun. Ballistics tests show that the Sterling submachine gun used in the Reavey shootings was the same as that used in the Donnelly's Bar attack at Silverbridge.

The Reavey and O'Dowd killings provoked the South Armagh Republican Action Force to retaliate the following evening by shooting ten Protestant workmen to death after ambushing their minibus outside Kingsmill. The Glenanne gang had decided to avenge this attack by killing at least 30 schoolchildren and their teacher at St Lawrence O'Toole Primary School in Belleeks. It was suggested that the gang member who proposed the idea was a UDR officer with ties to British Military Intelligence who was later shot dead by the IRA. McConnell's name, however, was not mentioned in this context. The plan was aborted at the last minute by the UVF's Brigade Staff (Belfast leadership), who deemed it "morally unacceptable" and feared such an attack against small children would lead to a civil war.

McConnell was later accused by Weir of planting a car bomb that blew up outside the Three Star Inn, a pub in Castleblaney's main street on 7 March 1976, killing one civilian Patrick Mone and injuring others on 7th Match 1976. The bomb was placed in a car next to that of Mr Mone's and was not intended for him. The explosives used had been stored at the Glenanne farm.

== Death ==
McConnell was shot dead by the IRA, who waylaid him in his garden outside his home in Tullyvallen, near Newtownhamilton on 5 April 1976. In November 1977, IRA volunteer Anthony McCooey was convicted of two counts of murder in respect of McConnell and another UDR soldier, Joseph McCullouch, who was stabbed and had his throat cut with a bayonet whilst visiting his farm in Tullyvallen. McCooey was also convicted of driving the gunmen to the Tullyvallen Orange Hall on 1 September 1975 where five civilians were shot dead. The attack was claimed by the South Armagh Republican Action Force, a cover name for the Provisional IRA.

According to author and journalist Joe Tiernan, the hitman in McConnell's killing was Peter Cleary, a Staff Officer in the 1st Battalion of the IRA's South Armagh Brigade. The three-man IRA unit hid in the bushes and when McConnell appeared, Cleary shot him twice in the head. Cleary himself was killed by the SAS 10 days later. McConnell was 32 years old and off-duty at the time of his death. His funeral was attended by NIO representatives of the Secretary of State for Northern Ireland, Merlyn Rees, the UDR's Commander Mervyn McCord and Colonel Commandant John Anderson. At the service, McConnell was summed up as a man who worked "ceaselessly for peace".

Statements made by Weir in his affidavit allege that McConnell had been set up by British Military Intelligence. Packy Reel, a (now deceased) Republican informer from Dorsey, County Armagh, told Weir that Captain Nairac had apprised him of McConnell's involvement in the Donnelly Bar attack. McConnell had been subsequently executed by the IRA after they received confidential information about him from Intelligence who, through Captain Nairac, had attempted to infiltrate the IRA. Tiernan suggested that after Robin Jackson, McConnell was one of the Glenanne gang's leading assassins in 1975 and early 1976, having been directly responsible for many sectarian attacks in South Armagh as well as counties Monaghan and Louth.

McConnell's nephew Brian, who joined Families Acting for Innocent Relatives (FAIR), a Markethill-based group set up to represent the Protestant and Unionist victims of republican violence, claimed that his uncle served as a liaison between the UVF and British security forces. FAIR has attracted much criticism due to its listing Robert McConnell as an "innocent" victim of republican violence in light of the multiple sectarian killings he allegedly carried out.

== Bibliography ==
- Potter, John Furniss. A Testimony to Courage – the Regimental History of the Ulster Defence Regiment 1969 – 1992, Pen & Sword Books Ltd, 2001, ISBN 0-85052-819-4
- Ryder, Chris. The Ulster Defence Regiment: An Instrument of Peace?, 1991 ISBN 0-413-64800-1
