= Peter Cleary =

Irish republican (1950–1976)

- Peter Cleary, taken on an unknown date
- Born: Peter Joseph Cleary; 18 September 1950; Northern Ireland
- Died: 15 April 1976 (aged 25); Forkhill, County Armagh
- Military career
- Allegiance: Provisional Irish Republican Army
- Rank: Staff Officer
- Unit: 1st Battalion South Armagh Brigade
- Conflict: The Troubles

Peter Joseph Cleary (18 September 1950 – 15 April 1976) was an Irish republican and a leading member of the 1st Battalion of the Provisional Irish Republican Army (IRA)'s South Armagh Brigade. He held the rank of Staff Officer and served as the unit's treasurer. He was implicated by journalist and author Joe Tiernan in the killing of Ulster Defence Regiment (UDR) corporal and alleged Ulster Volunteer Force (UVF) member Robert McConnell. Ten days after McConnell's killing, Cleary was shot dead by the Special Air Service (SAS) after being arrested at the home of his girlfriend outside Forkhill. He was the first person in Northern Ireland to be killed by the SAS, following the admission of their deployment there in January 1976. According to the SAS, he was shot after attempting to take the rifle from the officer who was guarding him in a bid to escape.

== Life and career ==
Cleary was born on 18 September 1950 in Northern Ireland, the second eldest of the 13 children of Hugh and Mary Cleary. He was brought up in the Roman Catholic religion, and according to author Tony Geraghty he was originally from Newry; although David McKittrick's book Lost Lives states he had lived in Magee Terrace, Belleeks, County Armagh. At some stage after the Troubles broke out in 1968, Cleary joined the 1st Battalion of the South Armagh Brigade of the Provisional IRA. He served as the unit's treasurer and held the rank of Staff Officer. He made his living as a scrap metal dealer.

Author and journalist Joe Tiernan claims that Cleary was part of the three-man IRA unit that ambushed and killed part-time Ulster Defence Regiment (UDR) corporal Robert McConnell in the garden of his home at Tullyvallen, near Newtownhamilton. Cleary and his team hid in the bushes and when McConnell appeared, Cleary shot him twice in the head, killing him. McConnell had allegedly been a member of both the UVF Mid-Ulster Brigade and the Glenanne gang, both of which carried out sectarian killings. In 1993 Yorkshire Television aired a programme, The Hidden Hand: The Forgotten Massacre, which implicated McConnell in the 1974 Dublin car bombings. The narrator also claimed McConnell was an Intelligence Corps agent with links to Captain Robert Nairac. RUC Special Patrol Group officer John Weir affirmed this in an affidavit and named McConnell as the perpetrator of a series of sectarian attacks. He also alleged that McConnell had been set up by the Intelligence Corps who passed on confidential information about McConnell to the IRA, through Nairac, in an attempt to infiltrate the organisation. Upon receiving this information, the IRA ordered the execution of McConnell.

== Killing ==
Cleary was on the run, living in the Republic of Ireland; however on 15 April 1976 (ten days after the McConnell shooting), he returned secretly to Northern Ireland where he was promptly arrested at the home of his pregnant girlfriend outside Forkhill. He was seized by an SAS team who had been watching the house from observation positions as part of a week-long surveillance job and taken to a field to await transport by a military helicopter, as travelling by road was deemed too risky for British military personnel. On the previous 31 March at 9:30am a group of Scots soldiers and SAS men had raided the Cleary family home in Magee Terrace, Belleeks. In their account of Cleary's killing, the SAS claimed that while four of the men were holding lanterns guiding the aircraft to a landing in the dark, the young officer (who was allegedly on his maiden SAS operation) left to guard Cleary was forced to shoot him twice after the latter made an attempt to wrest the officer's rifle from him in a bid to escape. Cleary, although gravely wounded, was still alive, and an NCO then took the rifle from the officer who had shot him, and killed him with a final, third shot to "end his misery". Before returning the weapon to its owner, he wiped away his fingerprints. An inquest into the killing was held nine months later. A witness who had been inside the house from where Cleary was arrested testified that immediately after the soldiers had taken Cleary away he heard somebody crying over the ditch, then a single shot. Three of the SAS team attended the inquest, a statement was read on behalf of the officer (using the nom de Guerre "Soldier A") who first shot Cleary. The statement defended his actions by describing Cleary as "heavier and stronger" than him, as well as a "notorious killer"; "Soldier A" went on to say

as he lurched at me my instincts as an SAS soldier took over. I released the safety catch on my weapon and started shooting. There was no chance to warn Cleary. I went on firing until the danger to me was over.

An open verdict was returned by the inquest.

Author Mike Ryan claimed in his book Secret Operations of the SAS that Cleary had actually managed to escape and was shot by the pursuing soldiers who had ordered him to stop as he tried to make his way to the Republic of Ireland border. Cleary received three shots to the chest.

Peter Cleary was the first person killed by the SAS since they were deployed to Northern Ireland in full force in January 1976 by order of British Prime Minister Harold Wilson in the wake of the Kingsmill massacre; although there had been an SAS presence in the province prior to then, having had a proxy intelligence role through the 14th Intelligence Company, and their sub-unit 4 Field Survey Troop.

John Weir claimed in his affidavit that Robert Nairac's cover had been blown when he was recognised at the SAS shooting of Peter Cleary, the implication being that Nairac had been present when the incident took place.

On 17 April 1976 the Cork Examiner described Cleary's killing as "an act of utter folly".
