= Hillcrest Bar bombing =

Bomb attack by the UVF in 1976

- Part of The Troubles
- Location: Donaghmore Road, Dungannon, County Tyrone, Northern Ireland, United Kingdom
- Date: 17 March 1976; 8:20 PM
- Attack type: Car bomb
- Deaths: 4
- Injuries: 50
- Perpetrator: Ulster Volunteer Force (Mid-Ulster Brigade)

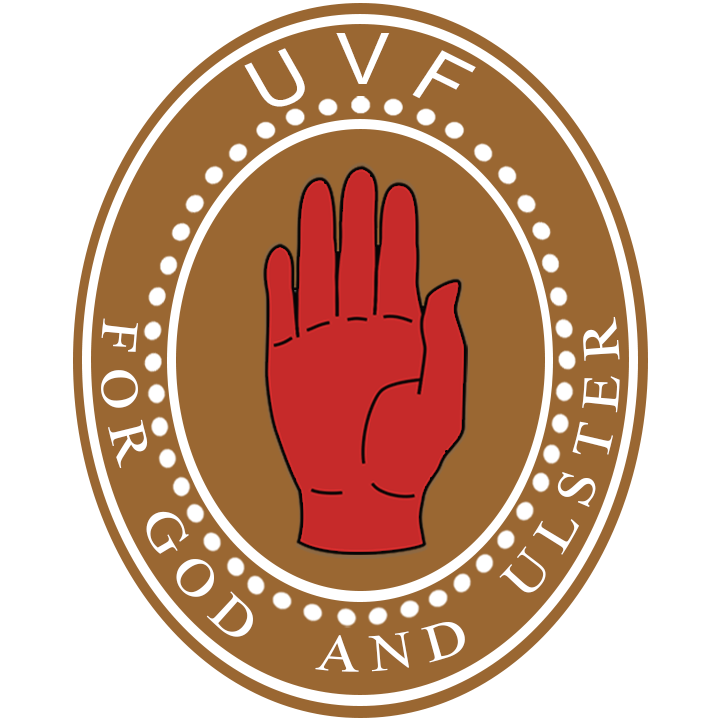
A graphic of the Ulster Volunteer Force emblem

The Hillcrest Bar bombing, also known as the "Saint Patrick's Day bombing", took place on 17 March 1976 in Dungannon, County Tyrone, Northern Ireland. The Ulster Volunteer Force (UVF), a loyalist paramilitary group, detonated a car bomb outside a pub crowded with people celebrating Saint Patrick's Day. Four Catholic civilians were killed by the blast—including two 13-year-old boys standing outside—and almost 50 people were injured, some severely.

In December 1980, UVF member Garnet James Busby confessed to having been one of the bombers and was sentenced to life in prison. The UVF unit responsible was the Mid-Ulster Brigade, which at the time was led by Robin Jackson. The attack is one of many linked to the Glenanne gang, a loose association of loyalist militants and rogue members of the Northern Ireland security forces, who carried out a series of attacks against the Catholic/Irish nationalist community in the area during the 1970s.

== Situation in Northern Ireland ==
By the mid-1970s, the conflict in Northern Ireland, known as the Troubles, showed no signs of abating. The Provisional Irish Republican Army (IRA) intensified its bombing campaign to drive British forces out, and began targeting English cities. The main loyalist paramilitary groups—the UVF and Ulster Defence Association (UDA)—responded with random attacks on the local Catholic population, which in turn led to IRA reprisals against Protestants.

During 1975 the IRA was officially on ceasefire. Loyalists believed the ceasefire was part of a secret deal between the British Government and IRA which would mean a British withdrawal from Northern Ireland. According to journalist Peter Taylor, the vicious tit-for-tat violence between the IRA and loyalists made 1975 one of the "bloodiest years of the conflict".

In Belfast, the loyalist Shankill Butchers gang, led by Lenny Murphy, began an 18-month killing spree designed to strike terror into the Catholic community, who they believed were giving succour to the IRA. The gang would drive around Catholic areas in a black taxi and kidnap random Catholic passersby, then torture and hack them to death. However, most tit-for-tat attacks were bombings and shootings targeting pubs, or roadside ambushes, as in the case of the Miami Showband massacre. This saw three members of the popular Irish cabaret band shot dead at a fake military checkpoint by UVF gunmen in British Army uniforms. Two of those convicted were Ulster Defence Regiment (UDR) soldiers. Investigations established that UVF Mid-Ulster Brigade commander Robin Jackson was the organizer and main gunman in the July 1975 ambush. Described as "the most notorious Loyalist paramilitary in Northern Ireland", it was also revealed that he was a Royal Ulster Constabulary (RUC) Special Branch agent. A further 50 paramilitary attacks have been linked to Jackson, including the 1974 Dublin and Monaghan bombings, which killed 33 people.

In January 1976, the UVF killed six members of two Catholic families in a co-ordinated attack. The following evening, IRA members (using the covername "Republican Action Force") retaliated by shooting eleven Protestant men after ordering them out of a minibus. Only one survived. Loyalists sought revenge, and members of the UVF Mid-Ulster Brigade planned to attack a nearby Catholic primary school. The operation was aborted by the UVF leadership on the grounds that it was "morally unacceptable", would provoke a terrible response from the IRA and could spark civil war.

Harold Wilson announced on 16 March 1976 that he was resigning as British Prime Minister. That same day, the British Army defused a 200-pound IRA bomb left outside a garage in Dungannon.

== The bombing ==
The Hillcrest Bar (now McAleer's) on Dungannon's Donaghmore Road, was a pub frequented by Catholics and was jointly owned by a Catholic and a Protestant. An incendiary device had been planted inside the premises the year before. On the evening of 17 March 1976, the pub was packed with revelers celebrating Saint Patrick's Day. There was also a disco for young people being held in a school across the road.

According to writer and former British soldier Ken Wharton, a loyalist attack had been anticipated in Northern Ireland as 'Catholic pubs' would be packed with people enjoying the Irish holiday. On the same day in East Belfast, Catholic teacher John Donnelly had been drinking in the Cregagh Inn on Woodstock Road. When one of his former students identified him as a Catholic, UDA members who happened to be in the pub forced him outside (in full view of the customers) and stabbed him to death behind the building.

That evening, UVF members parked a green Austin-Healey 1100 car outside the Hillcrest Bar. It had been stolen in Armagh nine days earlier. At 8.20 pm, the time bomb hidden in the car exploded. The blast killed three people outright and fatally wounded another. Almost 50 people were injured, nine of them severely. The force of the blast blew out all the pub's windows and rained debris on the footpath outside. The pub manager, who had been upstairs when the bomb detonated, said "everything just simply erupted around us. There was no warning".

One of those killed was Joseph Kelly (57), who had been inside the pub. Two 13-year-old boys, James McCaughey and Patrick Barnard, were in the street near the car bomb when it went off; James was mutilated beyond recognition and Patrick would die of his horrific injuries in hospital the following day. The boys were on their way to a disco at a school across the road. Andrew Small (62) was walking past with his wife and was also killed in the blast. All of the victims were Catholic civilians with no links to republican paramilitary groups. The getaway car used by the bombers had been stolen in Portadown. It was found burnt out a mile from the bomb site.

=== Responsibility ===
The 17 March bombing is one of the attacks that the Pat Finucane Centre (PFC) has attributed to the Glenanne gang. This was a loose alliance of loyalist militants (in particular the UVF Mid-Ulster Brigade) and rogue members of the Northern Ireland security forces: the Royal Ulster Constabulary (RUC) and the British Army's Ulster Defence Regiment (UDR). The group carried out a series of attacks against Catholics/Irish nationalists in the area during the 1970s. The PFC requested that Professor Douglass Cassel (formerly of Northwestern University School of Law in Chicago) convene an international inquiry to investigate allegations of collusion between loyalists and the security forces in sectarian killings. This international team concluded in their 2006 report that the Hillcrest Bar bombing was one of the attacks perpetrated by the Glenanne gang.

In December 1980, Dungannon UVF member Garnet James Busby confessed to having been part of the bombing unit. He also confessed to other attacks, including another Dungannon pub bombing, and the double murder of married couple Peter and Jane McKearney at Listamlet, Moy, County Tyrone in 1975. (The couple was mistakenly believed by loyalists to be related or even the parents of PIRA volunteer Margaret McKearney, but were, in fact, unrelated.) Although Busby named three other men involved in the Hillcrest Bar bombing he was the only one convicted. At his trial, an RUC inspector told the court that the same UVF group had carried out the Miami Showband killings. In 1981 Garnet Busby received six life sentences for the murders of the McKearneys, Joseph Kelly, Andrew Small, James McCaughey and Patrick Barnard. He was sent to the Maze Prison.

== See also ==
- Greysteel massacre
- Loughinisland massacre
- McGurk's Bar bombing
- Timeline of Ulster Volunteer Force actions

== Bibliography ==
- Llywelyn, Morgan 1999: A Novel of the Celtic Tiger and the Search For Peace, pp. 190–91
- Taylor, Peter (1999). Loyalists. London: Bloomsbury Plc. ISBN 978-1-57500-047-3
- The Cassel Report, 2006
- Wharton, Ken (2013). Wasted Years, Wasted Lives, Volume 1: The British Army in Northern Ireland, 1975-1977. UK: Helion & Company ISBN 978-1-910777-41-1
