= James Mitchell (loyalist) =

Ulster loyalist (1920–2008)

James Mitchell (1920 – May 2008) was an Ulster loyalist and Royal Ulster Constabulary (RUC) Reserve officer who provided a base and storage depot for the Glenanne gang at his farm at Glenanne, near Mountnorris, County Armagh, during the Troubles. The gang, which contained over 40 known members, included soldiers of the British Army's Ulster Defence Regiment (UDR), officers of the RUC, the Mid-Ulster Brigade of the illegal paramilitary Ulster Volunteer Force (UVF) and some Ulster Defence Association (UDA) members.

The Barron Report states that Billy Hanna, leader of the UVF Mid-Ulster Brigade, asked Mitchell for permission to use his farm as a UVF arms dump and bomb-making site. Information that loyalist paramilitaries were regularly meeting at the farm appeared on British Intelligence Corps documents from late 1972.

Before the Troubles Mitchell had been a member of the B Specials. He joined the RUC Reserve in September 1974, and was stationed at nearby Markethill. He was described as having been a "religious man".

Mitchell and his female housekeeper, Lily Shields, both denied knowledge that the farm was used for illicit paramilitary activity. They also denied partaking in any UVF attacks, although Shields later admitted her "involvement in certain events" to the RUC. In an affidavit, John Weir affirmed that the farmhouse was used as a base for UVF operations that included the Dublin and Monaghan bombings. Weir also stated that on one occasion an RUC constable gave him two weapons to store at the Glenanne farm:

He then offered me the two sub-machine guns because he knew about my connection to Loyalist paramilitaries. I accepted them and took them to Mitchell's farmhouse.

Weir named Mitchell as a UVF member who regularly participated in paramilitary activities. Weir claimed that Mitchell admitted being involved in the Dublin and Monaghan bombings, and went on to claim that on one occasion he had seen Mitchell mixing home-made ammonium nitrate and fuel oil explosive in the farmyard. Mitchell is named by Joe Tiernan as having personally made the bombs for Dublin and Monaghan along with John Irvine, a local UDR captain and friend of Mitchell, whom Tiernan states stole the gelignite used from local quarries over a period of several months.

According to Sean McPhilemy, Mitchell's farm was also used to launch a car bomb attack outside the Step Inn Bar in Clontibret, County Monaghan. McPhilemy states that the August 1976 bombing, which killed two civilians, was planned by Mitchell, Weir, Irvine (whom McPhilemy calls Irwin) and a number of unidentified loyalist paramilitaries. No charges have been brought in relation to the attack. McPhilemy further claims that Mitchell directly conspired with Robin Jackson to carry out two gun attacks on Catholic family homes in Gilford and Whitecross, County Armagh on 4 January 1976, resulting in the killings of three members of the O'Dowd family and three from the Reavey family respectively.

Mitchell left the RUC on 1 July 1977 for "personal reasons". He was convicted for possession of weapons found on his land after an RUC raid in December 1978 and received a one-year suspended sentence.

Mitchell died, aged 88, in May 2008 at Daisy Hill Hospital, Newry. He was buried in Tullyvallen.
