= Glenanne barracks bombing =

1991 IRA attack in Northern Ireland

- Part of the Troubles
- Part of the UDR barracks after the attack

- Location: 54°14′14.54″N 6°30′17.42″W; Near Mountnorris, County Armagh, Northern Ireland
- Date: 31 May 1991; 23:30 (UTC)
- Attack type: Bombing, gunfire
- Weapon: Truck bomb
- Deaths: 3 soldiers
- Injuries: 10 soldiers 4 civilians
- Perpetrator: Provisional IRA

The Glenanne barracks bombing was a large truck bomb attack carried out by the Provisional IRA against a British Army (Ulster Defence Regiment) base at Glenanne, near Mountnorris, County Armagh. The driverless lorry was rolled down a hill at the rear of the barracks and crashed through the perimeter fence. The bombing took place on 31 May 1991 and left three soldiers dead and 14 people wounded, four of them civilians.

== Background ==
The bombing took place at a time when the Northern Ireland Office arranged multi-party talks (known as the Brooke/Mayhew talks) on the future of Northern Ireland. Sinn Féin members were not invited to attend because of their links with the IRA, which prevented them from being recognised as a 'constitutional' party. The talks ended in failure soon after.

Built in 1972, the barracks housed two companies of the 2nd Battalion of the Ulster Defence Regiment (UDR). Seen as an outpost, it sat on the dividing line between a Protestant area and a Catholic area. Although the military barracks itself had not been attacked by the IRA before, seven UDR soldiers from the base had already been killed during The Troubles.

== The bombing ==
At 11:30 PM 2,500 lb (1,100 kg) of a new type of home made explosive developed by Rose Dugdale and Jim Monaghan on a driverless truck was rolled down a hill at the rear of the barracks and crashed through the perimeter fence. According to a witness, a UDR lance corporal who alerted the base, the truck was a Mercedes, and a Toyota Hiace van carrying at least two men acted as a support vehicle. The men were seen outside the parked van, masked and armed one with a handgun, the other with a submachine gun. This same witness alerted the base believing the IRA team were about to carry out a mortar attack, and debris thrown up on the roof by the lorry as it plunged down the hill was misinterpreted by some inside the base as a mortar projectile. Automatic fire was heard by other witnesses just before the main blast. A Reuters report claims that IRA members triggered the bomb by firing upon the driverless vehicle. It was later determined that the lorry had been stolen the day before in Kingscourt, County Cavan, in the Republic of Ireland.

The blast left a crater 200 ft (61 m) deep and threw debris and shrapnel as far as 300 yards (270 m). The explosion could be heard over 30 miles (48 km) away, as far as Dundalk. This was the biggest bomb detonated by the IRA until then. Most of the UDR base was destroyed by the blast and the fire that followed. At first, a massive mortar attack was suspected. Some livestock were killed and windows broken around the nearby Mossfield housing as a result of the explosion. The cars parked outside the base were obliterated. Ceilings were brought down and the local primary school was also damaged. A UDR sergeant present, who was duty officer (and whose wife was also a member of the UDR attending a social event on base) recalled the immediate aftermath of the explosion:

I stood up, and I saw that the reinforced wall had come down. The bench of the guardroom stopped it. The guard commander was lying there with reinforced concrete up to his chest, and he said, 'Fuck me. I thought I was going to lose my life.' I could see that his whole chest was trapped under this slab of concrete. The place was a mass of rubble. There was a big raging fire that was creeping towards him. It was only a matter of feet from him. The oil tank at the back of the building had ruptured and was just a big ball of fire. I put my arms under his armpits and pulled him out. I went to see if there was anybody hurt up the stairs. I waded through the rubble and couldn't see the stairs. There was a mass of twisted wire. The stairs had gone.

The barracks was usually manned by eight soldiers, but at the time there were 40 people in the complex, attending a social event. Three UDR soldiers – Lance corporal Robert Crozier (46), Private Sydney Hamilton (44) and Private Paul Blakely (30) – were killed and ten were wounded. Two of the men who were killed were caught by the explosion when they came out to investigate after a sentry gave the alarm; a third died inside the base. Four civilians were also wounded. The Provisional IRA claimed responsibility two days later.

Author Kevin Toolis lists the destruction of Glenanne UDR barracks in County Armagh as part of the cycle of violence and tit-for-tat killings in neighbouring County Tyrone. The IRA would later claim that the death of three of its men in the town of Coagh was an SAS retaliation for the Glenanne bombing.

The base was never rebuilt. It had outlived its operational usefulness and a decision had already been taken to close it down. The decision not to rebuild the compound raised some controversy among unionists. A memorial stone was erected by the main entrance road with the names of the UDR soldiers killed over the years while serving in Glenanne.

== Bibliography ==
- Geraghty, Tony: The Irish War. Johns Hopkins University Press, 2000. ISBN 0-8018-6456-9
- Potter, John: A Testimony to Courage – The Regimental History of the Ulster Defence Regiment 1969 – 1992. Pen & Sword Books Ltd, 2001. ISBN 0-85052-819-4
