= Ballydugan =

Townland in County Armagh, Northern Ireland

Coordinates: 54°24′49″N 6°21′32″W

Ballydugan or Ballydougan (from Irish Baile Uí Dhúgáin 'Ó Dúgáin's townland') is a townland in County Armagh, Northern Ireland. It lies on the County Armagh–County Down border, between Lurgan and Gilford. Ballydougan is within the Armagh City, Banbridge and Craigavon Borough Council area.

== The Troubles ==
The Mid-Ulster brigade of the Ulster Volunteer Force killed three Catholics in Ballydugan on 4 January 1976 as well as another three Catholics (three brothers) in Whitecross the same day. The Kingsmill massacre by the South Armagh Republican Action Force left 10 Protestant men dead the following day.

== Bloomvale House ==
Bloomvale House has had craftspeople living and working in it since 1785 and is currently the home of Ballydougan pottery ().
