= Kingsmill massacre =

1976 sectarian massacre during The Troubles in Northern Ireland

- Part of the Troubles
- The bullet-riddled minibus which the workmen were lined up against and shot

- Location: 54°12′55.7″N 06°27′03.1″W; Kingsmill, County Armagh; Northern Ireland
- Date: 5 January 1976; 50 years ago c. 17:30 (UTC)
- Attack type: Mass shooting
- Weapons: AR-15, AR-18, M1 rifle, M1 Carbine
- Deaths: 10
- Injuries: 1
- Perpetrator: Members of the Provisional IRA using the covername "South Armagh Republican Action Force"
- Motive: Anti-Protestantism

On 5 January 1976, near the village of Whitecross in south County Armagh, Northern Ireland, gunmen stopped a minibus carrying eleven Protestant workmen, lined them up alongside it and shot them. Only one victim survived, despite having been shot 18 times. A Catholic man on the minibus was allowed to go free. A group calling itself the South Armagh Republican Action Force claimed responsibility. It said the shooting was retaliation for a string of attacks on Catholic civilians in the area by Loyalists, particularly the killing of six Catholics the night before. The Kingsmill massacre was the climax of a string of tit-for-tat killings in the area during the mid-1970s, and was one of the deadliest mass shootings of the Troubles.

A 2011 report by the Historical Enquiries Team (HET) found that members of the Provisional IRA carried out the attack, despite the organisation being on ceasefire. The HET report said that the men were targeted because they were Protestants and that, although it was a response to the night before, it had been planned. The weapons used were linked to 110 other attacks.

Following the massacre, the British government declared County Armagh to be a "Special Emergency Area" and hundreds of extra troops and police were deployed in the area. It also announced that the Special Air Service (SAS) was being moved into South Armagh. This was the first time that SAS presence in Northern Ireland was officially acknowledged.

== Background ==
On 10 February 1975, the Provisional IRA and the British government entered a truce and restarted negotiations. The IRA agreed to halt attacks on the security forces, and the security forces mostly ended their raids and searches. However, there were dissenters on both sides. Some Provisionals wanted no part of the truce, while British commanders resented being told to stop their operations against the IRA just when they claimed to have had the Provisionals on the run. The security forces boosted their intelligence offensive during the truce and thoroughly infiltrated the IRA.

Sectarian killings rose during the truce, which officially lasted until February 1976. Loyalists feared they were about to be forsaken by the government and forced into a united Ireland. Protestant paramilitaries, hoping to provoke the IRA into retaliation and end the truce, stepped up their attacks on Catholic civilians, murdering 120 in 1975. Some IRA units concentrated on tackling loyalists. The fall-off in regular operations caused unruliness within the IRA, and some members, with or without permission from higher up, engaged in tit-for-tat killings. (Note: Irish National Liberation Army (INLA) members, and current or former members of the Official IRA, were also involved.) According to a police intelligence report, the Provisional IRA leadership reprimanded its South Armagh Brigade for carrying out sectarian killings.

Between the beginning of the truce on 10 February 1975 and the Kingsmill massacre, loyalist paramilitaries killed 35 Catholic civilians in County Armagh or on its borders. In the same period, republican paramilitaries killed 16 Protestant civilians and 17 members of the security forces in the same area. Many of the loyalist attacks have been linked to the Glenanne gang, a secret alliance of loyalist militants, British soldiers from the Ulster Defence Regiment (UDR), and police officers from the Royal Ulster Constabulary (RUC). A former member said they wanted to provoke a civil war, believing that when civil war erupted, they could then "crush the other side".

On 31 July 1975, loyalists shot five members of an Irish pop band at Buskhill, killing three. Like the Kingsmill massacre, the band's minibus had been stopped at a fake military checkpoint by gunmen in army uniform. Loyalists carried out two similar attacks over the following month.

On 1 September, gunmen burst into Tullyvallan Orange Hall and shot dead five Protestant civilians, all members of the Orange Order. The attack was claimed by a group calling itself the "South Armagh Republican Action Force". This was the first time the name had been used.

On 19 December, two Catholic civilians were killed and twenty injured when loyalists detonated a car bomb outside a pub in Dundalk, a few miles across the Irish border. Hours later, they killed three more Catholic civilians and injured six in a gun and bomb attack on a pub in Silverbridge. An RUC officer later admitted involvement, and detectives believed other RUC officers and a UDR soldier were also involved.

On 31 December, three Protestant civilians were killed in a bomb attack on a pub in Gilford. The "People's Republican Army" claimed responsibility. It is believed this was a cover name used by members of the INLA. Four days later, on 4 January 1976, loyalists shot dead six Catholic civilians in two co-ordinated attacks. They killed three members of the Reavey family at their home in Whitecross and three members of the O'Dowd family at their home in Ballydougan. The Irish News reported that the killings were revenge for the bombing in Gilford. RUC officer Billy McCaughey admitted taking part and accused another officer of involvement. His colleague, John Weir, said that two police officers and a British soldier were involved.

The HET report found that while the Kingsmill massacre was in "direct response" to the Reavey and O'Dowd killings, the attack had been planned before that. Following earlier loyalist attacks, republicans had apparently decided to "dramatically retaliate" if loyalists struck again. The report said "The murderous attacks on the Reavey and O'Dowd families were simply the catalyst for the premeditated and calculated slaughter of these innocent and defenceless men".

== Attack ==
The bullet-riddled minibus which the workmen were lined up against and shot

On 5 January 1976, just after 5:30 pm, a red Ford Transit minibus was carrying sixteen textile workers home from their workplace in Glenanne. Five were Catholics and eleven were Protestants. Four of the Catholics got out at Whitecross and the bus continued along the rural road to Bessbrook. As the bus cleared the rise of a hill, it was stopped by a man in combat uniform standing on the road and flashing a torch. The workers assumed they were being stopped and searched by the British Army. As the bus stopped, eleven gunmen in combat uniform and with blackened faces emerged from the hedges. A man "with a pronounced English accent" began talking. He ordered the workers to get out of the bus and to line up facing it with their hands on the roof. He then asked "Who is the Catholic?". The only Catholic was Richard Hughes. His workmates, now fearing that the gunmen were loyalists who had come to kill him, tried to stop him from identifying himself. However, when Hughes stepped forward the gunman told him to "Get down the road and don't look back".

The lead gunman then said "Right", and the others immediately opened fire on the workers. The eleven men were shot at very close range with automatic rifles, which included Armalites, an M1 carbine and an M1 Garand. A total of 136 rounds were fired in less than a minute. The men were shot at waist height and fell to the ground; some fell on top of each other, either dead or wounded. When the initial burst of gunfire stopped, the gunmen reloaded their weapons. The order was given to "Finish them off", and another burst of gunfire was fired into the heaped bodies of the workmen. One of the gunmen also walked amongst the dying men and shot them each in the head with a pistol as they lay on the ground.

Ten of them died at the scene: John Bryans (46), Robert Chambers (19), Reginald Chapman (25), Walter Chapman (23), Robert Freeburn (50), Joseph Lemmon (46), John McConville (20), James McWhirter (58), Robert Walker (46) and Kenneth Worton (24). Alan Black (then 32) was the only one who survived. He had been shot eighteen times and one of the bullets had grazed his head. He said, "I didn't even flinch because I knew if I moved there would be another one".

After carrying out the shooting, the gunmen calmly walked away. Shortly after, a married couple came upon the scene of the killings and began praying beside the victims. They found the badly wounded Alan Black lying in a ditch. When an ambulance arrived, Black was taken to a hospital in Newry, where he was operated on and survived. The Catholic worker, Richard Hughes, had managed to stop a car and was driven to Bessbrook RUC station, where he raised the alarm. One of the first police officers on the scene was Billy McCaughey, who had taken part in the Reavey killings. He said, "When we arrived it was utter carnage. Men were lying two or three together. Blood was flowing, mixed with water from the rain". Some of the Reavey family also came upon the scene of the Kingsmill massacre while driving to hospital to collect the bodies of their relatives. Johnston Chapman, the uncle of victims Reginald and Walter Chapman, said the dead workmen were "just lying there like dogs, blood everywhere". At least two of the victims were so badly mutilated by gunfire that immediate relatives were prevented from identifying them. One relative said the hospital mortuary "was like a butcher's shop with bodies lying on the floor like slabs of meat".

Nine of the dead were from the village of Bessbrook, while the bus driver, Robert Walker, was from Mountnorris. Four of the men were members of the Orange Order and two were former members of the security forces: Kenneth Worton was a former UDR soldier while Joseph Lemmon was a former Ulster Special Constabulary officer. Alan Black was appointed a Member of the Order of the British Empire (MBE) in the 2021 New Year Honours, for his cross-community work since the massacre.

== Perpetrators ==
The next day, a telephone caller claimed responsibility for the attack on behalf of the "South Armagh Republican Action Force" or "South Armagh Reaction Force". He said that it was retaliation for the Reavey–O'Dowd killings the night before, and that there would be "no further action on our part" if loyalists stopped their attacks. He added that the group had no connection with the IRA.

The IRA denied responsibility for the killings and was on a ceasefire at the time. It stated on 17 January 1976:

The Irish Republican Army has never initiated sectarian killings, and sectarianism of any kind is abhorrent to the Republican Movement [...] If the loyalist elements responsible for over 300 sectarian assassinations in the past four years stop such killing now, then the question of retaliation from whatever source will not arise.

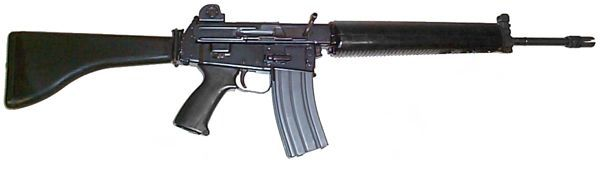
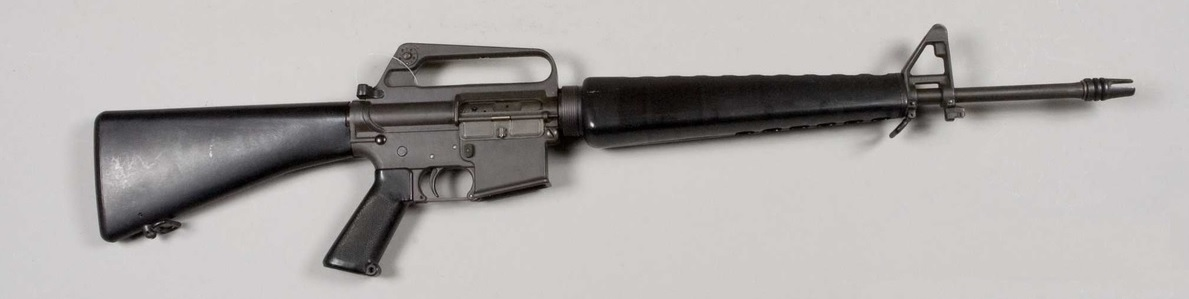
ArmaLite AR-180 (top) and AR-15 (bottom) were used in the attack; some were later seized and linked to the IRA

However, a 2011 report by the HET concluded that Provisional IRA members were responsible and that the event was planned before the Reavey and O'Dowd killings which had taken place the previous day, and that South Armagh Republican Action Force was a cover name. It added: "There is some intelligence that the Provisional IRA unit responsible was not well-disposed towards central co-ordination but there is no excuse in that. These dreadful murders were carried out by the Provisional IRA and none other". Responding to the report, Sinn Féin spokesman Mitchel McLaughlin said that he did "not dispute the sectarian nature of the killings" but continued to believe "the denials by the IRA that they were involved". SDLP Assemblyman Dominic Bradley called on Sinn Féin to "publicly accept that the HET's forensic evidence on the firearms used puts Provisional responsibility beyond question" and to stop "deny[ing] that the Provisional IRA was in the business of organising sectarian killings on a large scale".

According to journalist Toby Harnden, the British Military Intelligence assessment was that the attack was carried out by local IRA members "who were acting outside the normal IRA command structure". According to Harnden, RUC files suggest that 14 IRA members – including future 'Real IRA' leader Michael McKevitt – had met on New Year's Eve to plan the attack. Harnden quotes an alleged South Armagh IRA member, Volunteer M, who said that "IRA members were ordered by their leaders to carry out the Kingsmill massacre". Harnden also quotes Sean O'Callaghan, an IRA member who worked for the security forces as a double agent. O'Callaghan alleged that IRA Chief of Staff, Seamus Twomey, authorised the attack after Brian Keenan argued it was the only way to prevent more Catholics from being killed. However, O'Callaghan said the two men did not consult the IRA Army Council about the attack. Ruairí Ó Brádaigh claims that he and Twomey only learned of the Kingsmill attack after it had happened. According to a police intelligence report, the IRA Army Council reprimanded the South Armagh Brigade six weeks before the massacre for carrying out sectarian killings.

Two AR-18 rifles used in the shooting were found by the British Army in 1990 near Cullyhanna and forensically tested. It was reported that the rifles were linked to 17 killings in South Armagh from 1974 to 1990. Further ballistic studies found that guns used in the attack were linked to 37 killings, 22 attempted killings, 19 non-fatal shootings and 11 finds of spent cartridges between 1974 and 1989. The attacks all took place within the same area and it is likely they were carried out by the same small group.

=== Informer claims ===
In 2012, a secret Royal Military Police (RMP) document shown to the Sunday World newspaper revealed that the gunman who finished off the dying men could have been arrested five months later. The document says that the man (referred to as 'P') was wounded when British soldiers engaged an IRA unit near the Mountain House Inn in South Armagh on 25 June 1976. He managed to flee over the border and was treated at Louth County Hospital, but the other three IRA members were captured within hours. According to the RMP document, two of them named 'P' as the fourth member. Two of the guns captured had been used in the Kingsmill massacre. The RMP document reveals that the security forces knew 'P' was being treated at the hospital but "made no attempt to have him arrested and extradited". This has led to suspicions that 'P', "who has never been prosecuted despite extensive paramilitary involvement", was a British agent.

Alan Black, the only survivor of Kingsmill, believes that IRA members involved in the massacre were double agents working for the British authorities. He believes there was a "cover-up" and that British security forces knew the massacre was going to happen but allowed it to. Karen Armstrong, sister of victim John McConville, said: "A lot of people were being protected back then and they still are". It has been suggested that the gunman with the English accent could have been Robert Nairac. John Weir, a former RUC officer and member of the "Glenanne gang", claims he discovered that the intelligence services, through Nairac, was "playing republican and loyalist paramilitaries off against each other".

However, an inquest carried out by Judge Sherrard found "no evidence that informers were protected after the Kingsmill massacre". He went on to say that these rumours were "unevidenced and unhelpful conspiracy theorising. There was no evidence of anyone being allowed to continue in criminal ventures in order to protect informers,". Judge Sherrard added that "Captain Nairac was based in London, fully engaged in duties and was not in south Armagh, at the time". He added that these rumours were "largely allayed" and concluded by stating, "The notion that he would have been able to infiltrate the IRA is the stuff of utter fantasy, The inquest is entirely satisfied he had no role whatsoever."

=== Ian Paisley's claims ===
Immediately after the Kingsmill attack, some members of the security forces began a campaign of harassment against the Reavey family, and accused Eugene Reavey of organising the massacre.

In 1999, Democratic Unionist Party leader Ian Paisley stated in the House of Commons that Eugene Reavey was a "well-known republican" and had "set up the Kingsmills massacre". Paisley made the claims under parliamentary privilege, which meant he could not be prosecuted for his remarks. He claimed to be quoting from a "police dossier" but RUC chief constable Ronnie Flanagan denied Paisley was quoting a police dossier and stated he believed it to have originated from the UDR.

Paisley's claims were flatly rejected by Reavey and by the only survivor of the massacre, Alan Black. Susan McKay wrote in The Irish Times that, on hearing Paisley's accusations, Black went straight to the Reaveys' house and told Reavey that he knew he was innocent. The deputy First Minister of Northern Ireland, the SDLP's Seamus Mallon, expressed outrage at Paisley's claims. Ronnie Flanagan, chief constable of the RUC, said there was "no evidence whatsoever" to connect Reavey with the massacre, and that no police file contained any such allegation.

In January 2007, the HET apologised to the Reavey family for the British security force's allegations that Reavey had been involved in the Kingsmill attack. Despite this, the allegation continued to be promoted by local unionist activist Willie Frazer of Families Acting for Innocent Relatives (FAIR). In May 2010, the HET released a report which exonerated the three Reavey brothers and their family of any links to paramilitarism, leading Eugene Reavey to demand an apology from Paisley for his comments. Paisley died in 2014 without withdrawing his allegations.

== Reactions and aftermath ==
The massacre was condemned by the British and Irish governments, the main political parties and Catholic and Protestant church leaders. Merlyn Rees, the British Secretary of State for Northern Ireland, condemned the massacre and forecasted that the violence would escalate, saying "This is the way it will go on unless someone in their right senses stops it, it will go on".

The British government immediately declared County Armagh a "Special Emergency Area" and deployed hundreds of extra troops and police in the area. A battalion of the UDR was called out and the Spearhead Battalion was sent into the area. Two days after the massacre, the British Prime Minister Harold Wilson announced that the Special Air Service (SAS) was being sent into South Armagh. This was the first time that SAS operations in Northern Ireland were officially acknowledged. It is believed that some SAS personnel had already been in Northern Ireland for a few years. Units and personnel under SAS control are alleged to have been involved in loyalist attacks.

The Kingsmill massacre was the last in the series of sectarian killings in South Armagh during the mid-1970s. According to Willie Frazer of FAIR, this was a result of a deal between the local UVF and IRA groups.

=== Loyalist response ===
Loyalists allegedly planned to attack St Lawrence O'Toole Primary School in Belleeks as retaliation for the massacre

There were no immediate revenge attacks by loyalists but in the 2000s it emerged that local UVF members had plotted to kill 30 Catholic schoolchildren as retaliation, by attacking St Lawrence O'Toole Primary School in Belleeks. The loyalists were members of the "Glenanne gang", which had carried out the Reavey–O'Dowd killings and included RUC and UDR members. The attack was allegedly called off because the UVF leadership ruled it would be "morally unacceptable" and would lead to a harsh IRA response and likely civil war. Allegedly, the leadership also suspected that the member who suggested the attack was working with British Military Intelligence and that Military Intelligence were seeking to provoke a civil war. The plot was revealed by two former Glenanne gang members, including Billy McCaughey, who admitted the plot in a 2004 documentary.

Another UVF gang, the "Shankill Butchers", also planned retaliation for the massacre. This gang, led by Lenny Murphy, operated in Belfast and was notorious for its late-night kidnapping, torture and murder (by throat slashing) of random Catholic civilians. Murphy planned to attack a lorry that ferried Catholic workmen to Corry's Timber Yard in West Belfast, shooting all on board. Murphy abandoned the plan after the workers changed their route and transport. The following month on the 9 February 1976, a UVF unit did attack a truck coming out of the Timber Yard, but shot dead two Protestant civilians whom the unit assumed were Catholics, three other civilians were injured in the shooting. Some loyalists claim the Kingsmill massacre was the reason they joined paramilitary groups, notably Billy Wright, who said,

I was 15 when those workmen were pulled out of that bus and shot dead. I was a Protestant and I realised that they had been killed simply because they were Protestants. I left Mountnorris, came back to Portadown and immediately joined the youth wing of the UVF.

He became commander of the UVF Mid-Ulster Brigade in the early 1990s; Wright later founded the breakaway Loyalist Volunteer Force in 1996. He was suspected of at least 20 sectarian killings of Catholics in the 1980s and 1990s.

Another with similar claims was RUC Special Patrol Group officer Billy McCaughey, who was one of the first RUC officers on the scene of the massacre. He told Toby Harnden, "the sides of the road were running red with blood and it was the blood of totally innocent Protestants". Afterwards, McCaughey says, he began passing RUC intelligence to loyalist militants and also to participate in their operations. McCaughey was convicted in 1980 of a sectarian killing, the kidnapping of a Catholic priest and an attempted bombing. McCaughey had colluded with loyalists before the Kingsmill attack and later admitted taking part in the Reavey killings the day before, he claimed he "was at the house but fired no shots". McCaughey also gave his view on how the massacre affected loyalists,

I think Kingsmills forced people to ask themselves where they were going, especially the Protestant support base, the civilian support base – the people who were not members of the UVF but would let you use a building or a field. Those people, many of them withdrew. It wasn't because of anything the UVF did. It was fear of retaliation.

No one was charged with the Kingsmill massacre. In August 2003, there were calls for the Police Service of Northern Ireland to reopen the files relating to the massacre.

=== Republican response ===
The IRA denied involvement in the attack but the double agent Sean O'Callaghan and others have alleged it was ordered by two IRA leaders; other republican leaders were reported to be very unhappy about it. According to O'Callaghan, Gerry Adams said in an Army Council meeting, "there'll never again be another Kingsmill". One South Armagh IRA member allegedly resigned in disgust at the massacre.

Toby Harnden said that IRA members in South Armagh who talked to him in the late 1990s generally condemned the massacre. One, Volunteer G, was quoted as saying that he "never agreed with Kingsmill". Another, Volunteer M, was quoted as saying that it was "a gut reaction [to the killing of Catholics] and a wrong one. The worst time in my life was in jail after Kingsmill. It was a dishonourable time". Republican activist Peter John Caraher said that those ultimately responsible were "the loyalists who shot the Reavey brothers". He added, "It was sad that those people [at Kingsmill] had to die, but I'll tell you something, it stopped any more Catholics being killed". This view was reiterated by a County Tyrone republican and Gaelic Athletic Association veteran who spoke to Ed Moloney. "It's a lesson you learn quickly on the football field... If you're fouled, you hit back". Colin Worton, whose brother was killed in the massacre, said "Kingsmill did stop Catholics being killed in South Armagh, but that doesn't justify it".

In 2018 Sinn Féin politician John O'Dowd condemned the massacre as "shameful" and was backed by his party colleagues. O'Dowd's uncle and two of his cousins had been shot dead by loyalists in the day before the massacre.

=== Inquest ===
An inquest held to review the Kingsmill massacre found that it was "an overtly sectarian attack mounted by the IRA". The coroner, Judge Sherrard said it was an attack planned well in advance by a unit consisting of at least 12 IRA members. It found that the attack was "carried out by the IRA operating under the authority of the Army Council which had, in April 1975, given wide authorisation to IRA units". Judge Sherrard added that the IRA failed to engage with the inquest and that there was "no acknowledgement by the IRA of the utter wrongness of the atrocity, its impact on those bereaved or the damage caused to the entire community".

=== Legacy ===
On 29 April 2025 a watchdog report into the Kingsmill Massacre identified a series of failings in the original police investigation of the incident, including a "wholly insufficient" deployment of resources to catch the killers.

== Commemoration ==
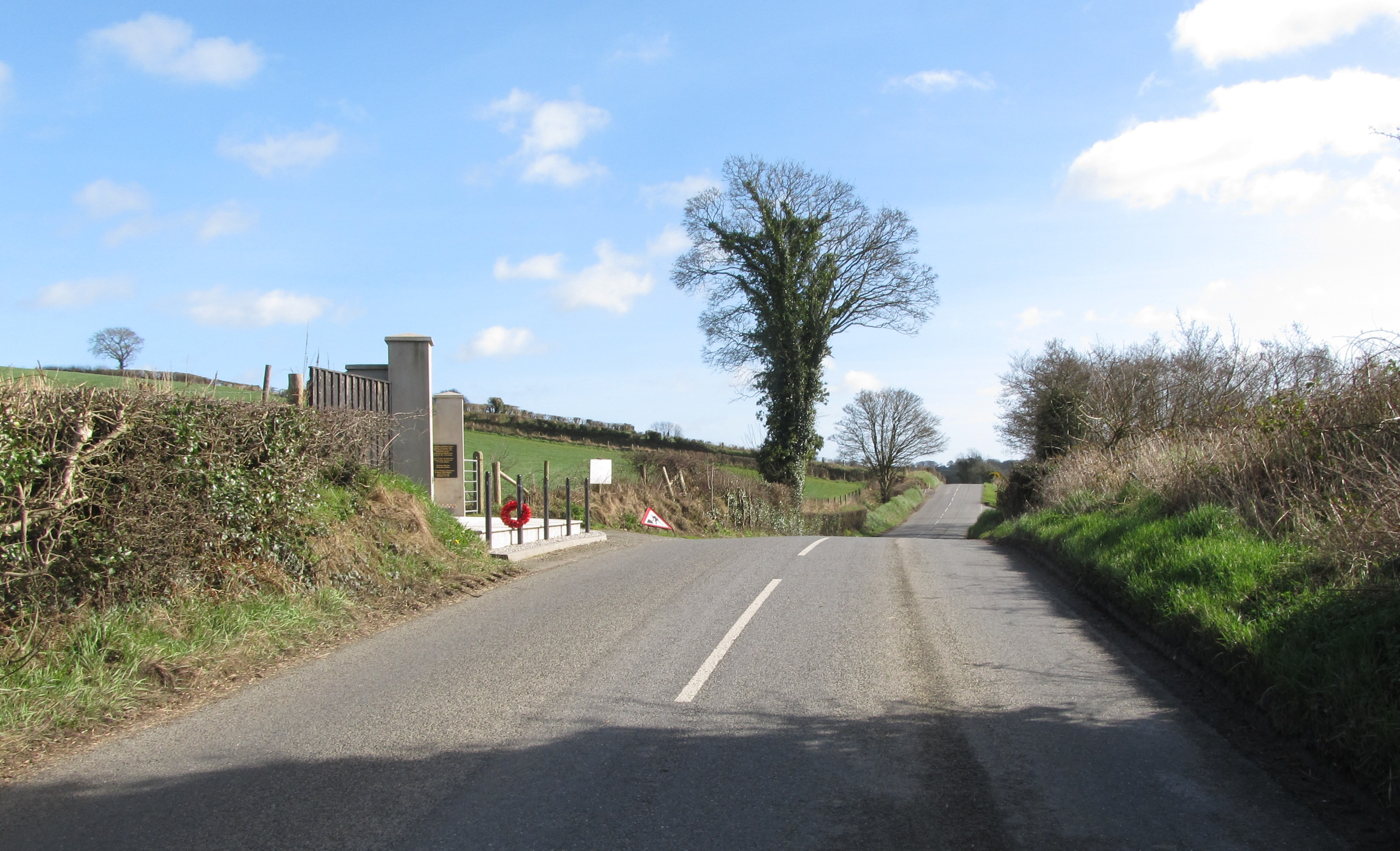
The memorial at the site of the massacre. The minibus was stopped at the left side of the road.

There is a memorial in Bessbrook dedicated to 'The Innocent Victims Murdered at Kingsmills'. For many years after the massacre there was a small memorial at the site of the massacre. A new and much larger memorial was built there in 2012. This memorial has been vandalised and it is claimed there was an attempt to "intimidate" the builders. The following year, Northern Ireland's Environment Minister Alex Attwood (of the SDLP) apologised after his department mistakenly sent a letter to the landowner demanding it be removed for lack of planning permission. Unionist politician William Irwin criticised the department and said it had not taken action against "illegal roadside terrorist memorials" erected by republicans.

In February 2012, controversy arose when Willie Frazer of FAIR proposed a "March for Justice" in which the victims' relatives, along with 11 loyalist bands, would follow the route taken by the workmen the night they were killed. This would have meant passing through the mainly Catholic village of Whitecross and past the homes of the Reavey family, where the three brothers had been killed the night before the massacre. Over 200 people opposed the march at a meeting with the Parades Commission in Whitecross. Local SDLP and Sinn Féin politicians also opposed it, saying it would raise sectarian tension in the area. The Parades Commission approved the march on condition that there be no marching bands, flags, banners or placards. One organiser received a death threat telling him that he would be shot and his church would be burnt if the march went ahead. The organisers postponed the march; a move that was welcomed by local nationalist politicians and by Ulster Unionist politician Danny Kennedy.

== See also ==
- List of massacres in the United Kingdom
- List of massacres in Ireland
- Miami Showband massacre, a similar ambush on a minibus during The Troubles.
