= Glenanne gang =

Informal alliance of Ulster loyalists in the 1970s

Coordinates: 54.25317°N 6.517139°W

- Drong Ghleann Anna (Irish)
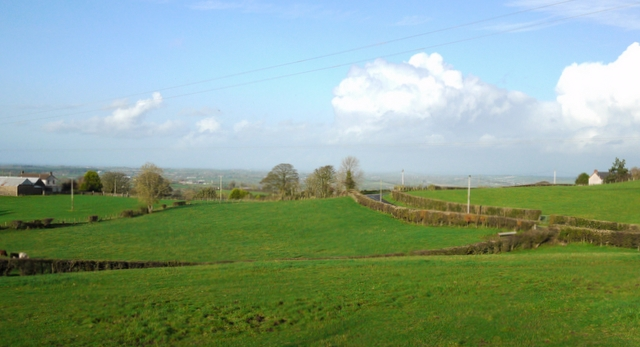
- Fields near the farm where the gang was based (Ballylane townland, near Glenanne, County Armagh)
- Leaders: John Weir; Billy McCaughey; Billy Hanna; Robin Jackson; Harris Boyle
- Dates active: 1972–1980
- Headquarters: Glenanne, County Armagh, Northern Ireland
- Active regions: Mainly County Armagh and east County Tyrone
- Ideology: Ulster loyalism Irish unionism
- Size: 40 known members
- Part of: Ulster Volunteer Force
- Wars: The Troubles

Glenanne Farm
- Location within Northern Ireland
- District: Armagh City, Banbridge and Craigavon
- County: County Armagh
- Country: Northern Ireland
- Sovereign state: United Kingdom
- Post town: ARMAGH
- Postcode district: BT60
- UK Parliament: Newry & Armagh
- NI Assembly: Newry & Armagh

The Glenanne gang or Glenanne group was a secret informal alliance of Ulster loyalists who carried out shooting and bombing attacks against Catholics and Irish nationalists in the 1970s, during the Troubles. Most of its attacks took place in the "murder triangle" area of counties Armagh and Tyrone in Northern Ireland. It also launched some attacks elsewhere in Northern Ireland and in the Republic of Ireland. The gang consisted of soldiers from the British Army's Ulster Defence Regiment (UDR), police officers from the Royal Ulster Constabulary (RUC) and members of the Mid-Ulster Brigade of the Ulster Volunteer Force (UVF). Twenty-five UDR soldiers and RUC police officers were named as purported members of the gang.

Details about the group have come from many sources, including the affidavit of former member and RUC officer John Weir; statements by other former members; police, army and court documents; and ballistics evidence linking the same weapons to various attacks. Since 2003, the group's activities have also been investigated by the 2006 Cassel Report and three reports commissioned by Irish Supreme Court Justice Henry Barron, known as the Barron Reports. A book focusing on the group's activities, Lethal Allies: British Collusion in Ireland, by Anne Cadwallader, was published in 2013. It drew on all the aforementioned sources, as well as Historical Enquiries Team investigations. The book was the basis for the 2019 documentary film Unquiet Graves, directed by Sean Murray.

According to Lethal Allies, permutations of the group killed about 120 people – almost all of whom were Catholic civilians with no links to Irish republican paramilitaries. The Cassel Report investigated 76 killings attributed to the group and found evidence that UDR soldiers and RUC police officers were involved in 74 of those. John Weir said his superiors knew he was working with loyalist militants but allowed it to continue. The Cassel Report also said that some senior officers knew of the crimes but did nothing to prevent, investigate or punish. It has been alleged that some key members were double agents working for British military intelligence and RUC Special Branch.

Attacks attributed to the group include the Dublin and Monaghan bombings (1974), the Miami Showband killings (1975), the Reavey and O'Dowd killings (1976) and the Hillcrest Bar bombing (1976). Many of the victims were killed at their homes or in indiscriminate attacks on Catholic-owned pubs with guns and/or bombs. Some were shot after being stopped at fake British Army checkpoints and a number of the attacks were co-ordinated. When it wished to "claim" its attacks, the group usually used the name "Protestant Action Force" (a cover name for the UVF). The name "Glenanne gang" has been used since 2003 and is derived from the farm at 59 Lough Road, Glenanne (three miles south of Markethill, County Armagh) that was used as the gang's main 'base of operations'. It also made use of a farm near Dungannon.

== Political situation in Northern Ireland ==
By the mid-1970s the violent ethno-political conflict known as the Troubles had radically transformed the daily lives of people in Northern Ireland; after five years of turbulent civil unrest, the bombings and shootings showed no signs of abating. The armed campaign waged by members of the loyalist paramilitary groups Ulster Volunteer Force and the Ulster Defence Association (UDA) increased greatly in response to the Provisional IRA carrying out attacks in England and increasing its attacks on the British security forces within Northern Ireland. Suspected Catholic civilians had become the primary targets of loyalist gangs forces. Active members of the RUC Special Patrol Group (SPG) believed that the situation was rapidly deteriorating and that the IRA were actually 'winning the war'. As early as the end of 1973, it was suggested that drastic measures had to be taken to defeat the organisation. The SPG was a specialised police unit tasked with providing back-up to the regular RUC and to police sensitive areas.

On 10 February 1975, the Provisional IRA and British government entered into a truce and restarted negotiations. The IRA agreed to halt attacks on the British security forces and the security forces mostly ended its raids and searches. However, there were dissenters on both sides. Fully opposed to the agreement, the UVF and UDA/UFF wanted no part of the truce, while British military commanders resented being told to stop their operations against the IRA just when—they claimed—they had the Provisionals on the run. There was a rise in sectarian killings during the truce, which 'officially' lasted until February 1976. Ulster loyalist paramilitaries, fearing they were about to be forsaken by the British government and forced into a united Ireland, increased their attacks on Roman Catholic civilians and nationalists. Increased Loyalist attacks were partially due to their discovery that MI6 agent Michael Oatley had engaged in negotiations with a member of the IRA Army Council during which "structures of disengagement" from Ireland were discussed. While these 1:1 talks could potentially have meant a possible withdrawal of British troops from Northern Ireland, it is not known how far they ever progressed. Loyalists killed 120 Catholics in 1975, the vast majority civilians. They hoped to force the IRA to retaliate in kind and thus hasten an end to the truce, but were unsuccessful.

== Formation of the Glenanne gang ==
It was during this exceptionally violent period that a group of loyalist extremists formed a loose alliance that in 2003 was belatedly given the name "Glenanne gang". The gang, which contained over 40 known members, included soldiers of the British Army's Ulster Defence Regiment (UDR), active police officers within the RUC and its Special Branch, covert agents from the Secret Intelligence Service (SIS), more commonly known as MI6 (i.e. Military Intelligence, Section 6) and extremists from both the illegal Mid-Ulster Brigade and the legal Ulster Defence Association (UDA).

This group began to carry out shooting and bombing attacks directed against Catholics and nationalists to retaliate for the IRA's intensified campaign. Most of these attacks took place in the area of County Armagh and Mid-Ulster referred to as the "murder triangle" by journalist Joe Tiernan. It also launched attacks elsewhere in Northern Ireland and in the Republic of Ireland. The name "Glenanne gang" is derived from the farm at Glenanne (near Markethill, County Armagh) that was used as the gang's arms dump and bomb-making site.

== Alleged members ==
The following people, among others, have been implicated by Justice Barron and Professor Douglass Cassel in their respective reports as having been members of the Glenanne gang:

=== Key figures ===
- John Oliver Weir (born 1950, County Monaghan, Republic of Ireland) — an officer in the RUC Special Patrol Group (an "anti-terrorist" unit) and UVF member. Weir was the son of a gamekeeper and was brought up on an estate near Castleblaney. He attended a Protestant boarding school in Dublin. After joining the RUC in 1970, he worked at Strandtown RUC station in Belfast. In 1972, he was transferred to Armagh where he was recruited by the SPG on 1 August 1973. Following the IRA killing of two members of the security forces in 1974 and 1975, he was sent for his own safety to the SPG unit in Castlereagh, Belfast. On an unspecified date between January 1975 and September 1976, he joined the Glenanne gang. Weir then spent six weeks at the Lisanelly Army base in Omagh; in 1976 he was promoted to the rank of sergeant and transferred to Newry RUC barracks. He claimed to have been directly involved in the bomb attack at Tully's Bar in Belleek, the attempted bombing of Renaghan's Bar, Clontibret, County Monaghan, and to have visited the Glenanne farm regularly during the autumn of 1976. In November 1977, he was sent to Newtownhamilton RUC barracks. In 1980, he left the RUC upon his conviction for the 1977 killing of William Strathearn, a Catholic chemist. He was released from prison in 1992. During and after his imprisonment he made a number of allegations incriminating his former associates in the Glenanne gang. His 1999 affidavit was published in the 2003 Barron Report on the Dublin and Monaghan bombings. Weir also implicated Chief Inspector Harry Breen in having direct knowledge of the gang's activities in his Affidavit of 3 January 1999.
  Among other claims, he stated "In summary, Down Orange Welfare was using RUC officers in Newry RUC station - McBride, Breen, myself - and another RUC officer, Sergeant Monty Alexander from Forkhill RUC station - to supply weapons to the UVF in Portadown. I later learned that these weapons were being manufactured by Samuel McCoubrey in Spa, Co. Down."
- William "Billy" McCaughey (died 2006) — Armagh RUC SPG officer who had acted as a close protection guard for Ulster Unionist Party politician John Taylor and a UVF member. He was a former member of the Ulster Special Constabulary. McCaughey was implicated by his colleague Weir in many Glenanne gang attacks, such as the O'Dowd shootings and the assault on the Rock Bar, and he admitted to having kidnapped a Roman Catholic priest. McCaughey was convicted along with Weir for the killing of William Strathearn and sentenced to 16 years imprisonment. McCaughey received a seven-year sentence for wounding Michael McGrath during the attack on the Rock Bar, was sentenced on explosives and possession charges and was also sentenced to three years' imprisonment for the kidnapping of Fr Hugh Murphy.
- Billy Hanna (c. 1929 – 27 July 1975, Lurgan, County Armagh) — Korean War veteran, founder of the UVF Mid-Ulster Brigade and its commander until July 1975; he had also served as a sergeant in the C Company, 11th Battalion UDR before being dismissed for leaking classified information to the UVF. He was the gang's staff instructor. Colin Wallace maintained Hanna had organised the Dublin bombings in May 1974.
  Journalist Joe Tiernan has further alleged that Hanna was an Intelligence Corps mole inside the UVF. He was the person who first approached James Mitchell for permission to use the property as an arms dump and bomb-making site. Hanna was shot dead outside his home in Lurgan in July 1975, allegedly because Hanna was thought by Robin Jackson to be passing information to his handlers implicating the UVF Mid-Ulster Brigade in the recent Dublin and Monaghan bombings. Hanna had allegedly done so because of having a troubled conscience over the fact that at least two children had been collateral damage during the Dublin bombings.
- Robin "The Jackal" Jackson (27 September 1948, Donaghmore, County Down – 30 May 1998, Donaghcloney, County Down) — commander of the UVF Mid-Ulster Brigade from July 1975 to the early 1990s, Ulster Defence Regiment (UDR) member and an alleged RUC Special Branch agent with ties to military intelligence. He assumed leadership of the brigade upon the shooting death of Hanna, for which he was said by both Hanna's widow and Tiernan to have been personally responsible. Weir implicated Robin Jackson in a number of the gang's other killings, and has named him as having been a "key figure" in the gang. Following the 1993 Yorkshire Television programme The Hidden Hand which implicated Jackson in the Dublin bombings but did not mention him by name, he was questioned. He denied involvement in the three car bombings which left 26 people dead. and Miami Showband killings. He was only convicted once (in 1981), for possession of a .22 pistol, a .38 revolver, a magazine, 13 rounds of ammunition and hoods; however, he was released after having served two years of a seven-year sentence. Jackson's fingerprints were found on a home-made silencer attached to a Luger pistol (serial number U 4) retrieved at Ted Sinclair's farm in 1976. Jackson's name appeared on the Garda Síochána suspects list for the Dublin and Monaghan bombings. Jackson was named in court as one of the killers of William Strathern by Weir and McCaughey. The court was told by an RUC officer that Jackson and Kerr were not before the court as part of "operational strategy". Jackson died of lung cancer in 1998.
- Robert McConnell — a UVF member and 2nd Battalion UDR corporal. The Barron Report lists him as one of the suspects in the Dublin bombings. He allegedly had links to both RUC Special Branch and the Intelligence Corps, and it was claimed he was controlled before and after the bombings by Robert Nairac. McConnell was named by both Lily Shields and Laurence McClure as being involved in the Donnelly's Bar killings. Weir states he took part in the John Francis Green shooting along with Robin Jackson and Harris Boyle. He was named by Weir as the leading gunman in the Reavey family shootings. McConnell was killed by the IRA on 5 April 1976.
- Laurence McClure — a UVF member and RUC SPG officer, having joined the Armagh SPG in May 1975. He was a close neighbour of James Mitchell and owned a repair garage adjacent to the farm. McClure was named by Weir as having taken part in several sectarian attacks including those at Donnelly's Bar and the Rock Bar, the latter for which he was convicted and received a two-year sentence, suspended for three years. Weir alleges that McClure had helped assemble the bombs used in Dublin. McClure admitted being a getaway driver for those involved in the Donnelly's Bar bombing and to have waited in the car with Lily Shields; the two acting as a "courting couple". McClure was charged with withholding information in relation to the attack on Donnelly's Bar. The barrister for the UDR and the police ... said he had obtained a nolle prosequi sentence, a Latin legal phrase meaning "to be unwilling to pursue" (amounting to "do not prosecute") against the charge. The only person who can authorise a nolle prosequi is the Attorney General.
- James Mitchell (c. 1920 – May 2008) — an RUC Reserve officer and the owner of the Glenanne farm. He joined the RUC Reserve in September 1974 and was stationed at Markethill. He left the force on 1 July 1977 for "personal reasons". Weir named him as a UVF member who regularly participated in paramilitary activities. Weir claimed that Mitchell admitted being involved in the Dublin and Monaghan bombings, and that he had seen Mitchell mixing home-made ammonium-nitrate-and-fuel-oil explosive in the farmyard on one occasion. He was convicted for possession of weapons found on his land after an RUC raid in December 1978. In an RUC interview on 9 August 2000, he staunchly denied Weir's allegations and referred to him as "a damned liar and convicted murderer". Mitchell died, aged 88, in May 2008 at Daisy Hill Hospital, Newry. Willie Frazer attended his funeral and told media "I'm not saying he was lily–white but he was a decent man".
- Robert John "R.J". Kerr (c. 1943 – 7 November 1997) — UDA commander. He was charged with having weapons and ammunition in suspicious circumstances in 1972; later found guilty of armed robbery on 10 March 1973. Kerr was sentenced in 1974 in relation to the intimidation and assaulting of two men in 1973 and received 18 months in jail. Kerr was named as one of the killers of William Strathearn by Weir and McCaughey. The court was told by an RUC officer that Jackson and Kerr were not before the court as part of "police strategy". He died in a mysterious explosion, his body having been found in the vicinity of a burnt-out boat that was being towed on a trailer on the main Newry to Warrenpoint Road.
- Harris Boyle (1953, Portadown – 31 July 1975, Buskhill, County Down) — UDR soldier and UVF member. Boyle was unmarried and worked as a telephone wireman. He was charged with having weapons and ammunition in suspicious circumstances in 1972. Boyle was killed when a bomb he had placed on the Miami Showband bus exploded prematurely. He was implicated in the Dublin and Monaghan bombings, and the killing of IRA volunteer John Francis Green in County Monaghan. According to submissions received by Mr Justice Barron, the Monaghan bomb was assembled at Boyle's home on Festival Road in Portadown's Killicomaine estate.
- Wesley Somerville (born County Tyrone – died 31 July 1975, Buskhill, County Down) — UDR soldier and a UVF lieutenant. He was a textile worker by trade. He was killed when a bomb he had placed on the Miami Showband bus exploded prematurely. Wesley Somerville was also charged along with two others for kidnapping two bread deliverymen. The kidnapping charge was connected to a bomb attack at Mourne Crescent, Dungannon. Weir named Somerville as having been involved in the 1974 bombing in Monaghan.
- Gary Armstrong — RUC sergeant, given a two-year suspended sentence in relation to the kidnapping of a Catholic priest, Father Hugh Murphy, in retaliation for the murder of a policeman. Armstrong was named by Judge Barron as one of the group of RUC members who carried out the gun and bomb attack on the Rock Bar.
- Joseph Stewart Young — UVF member from Portadown. His name appears on the Garda suspects list for the Dublin and Monaghan bombings. John Weir claims that Young had been part of the unit that carried out the Monaghan bombing. When questioned, Young denied the allegation. He was also suspected of involvement in the attack on Donnelly's bar.

=== Other members ===
- Captain John Irwin — UDR intelligence officer. Weir declares in his affidavit that Irwin provided the explosives for the Dublin and Monaghan bombings and delivered them to Mitchell's farm, where they were then assembled.
- Lance corporal Thomas Raymond Crozier (born 1951, Lurgan, County Armagh) — C Company, 11th Battalion UDR and UVF member; he worked as a painting contractor. He was convicted in October 1976 in relation to the Miami Showband killings. He was also arrested in 1975 along with Samuel Fulton Neil and Robin Jackson in possession of four shotguns.
- Sergeant James Roderick McDowell (from Lurgan, County Armagh) — also C Company, 11th Battalion UDR, and UVF member, he was an optical worker; convicted in October 1976 in relation to Miami Showband killings.
- John James Somerville (died January 2015) — former UDR soldier from Moygashel, County Tyrone; brother of Wesley (see above); worked as a lorry-helper; convicted on 9 November 1981 in relation to the Miami Showband killings. Somerville was also charged along with two others with kidnapping two bread deliverymen. The kidnapping charge was also connected to a bomb attack at Mourne Crescent in Dungannon. He was also convicted of an armed robbery on a CIÉ bus in Aughnacloy and causing approximately £12,000 worth of damage to the bus. He was named by Weir as having been involved in the Monaghan bombing.
- Sarah Elizabeth "Lily" Shields — Mitchell's housekeeper. She was named by Weir as having provided the getaway car for those who attacked McArdle's Bar and Donnelly's Bar. Charges were later brought against her for withholding information regarding the latter attack. However, the trial judge and DPP brought a nolle prosequi against the charge in April 1981.
- George Moore was found guilty of the attempted killing of Patrick Turley, assault and possession of a gun and ammunition.
- Gordon Liggett — Ulster Defence Association (UDA) commander. He was found guilty of causing grievous and actual bodily harm to Patrick Turley; as well as armed robbery and possession of a gun and ammunition.
- William Ashton Wright — UDR soldier. He was charged with having weapons and ammunition in suspicious circumstances in 1972. He was later found guilty of armed robbery, which had taken place on 10 March 1973. Wright was sentenced in 1974 in relation to the intimidation and assaulting of two men in 1973 and received a six-month suspended sentence.
- George Hyde — charged in connection with the attempted murder of Patrick Turley; he was later found beaten to death in prison.
- Edward "Ted" Sinclair (from Dungannon) was convicted of possession of a Luger pistol (serial number U 4), a .38 ACP pistol, homemade machine guns, gelignite and ammunition in 1976. He was released in 1979. Sinclair was arrested again in 1980 and charged with possession of a .45 revolver and ammunition. However, charges were withdrawn by the DPP. Sinclair was also charged with the 1976 killings of Peter and Jane McKearney (a married couple mistakenly believed to be the parents of an IRA volunteer with the same surname, Margaret McKearney, although there was no relation). In 1982 (the following year), these charges were also dropped by the DPP.
- Garnet James Busby was convicted of the killings of Peter and Jane McKearney in October 1975 (see above). He was also convicted of the killings of Andrew Small, James McCaughey, Joseph Kelly and Patrick Barnard at the Hillcrest Bar in Dungannon. He planted the bomb at O'Neill's Bar in Dungannon. During his trial an RUC inspector told the court that the same UVF gang was responsible for the attack on the Miami Showband.
- Billy Corrigan was named as taking part in Denis Mullen's killing during the trial of John Parr. Corrigan was killed by the IRA in 1976.
- Henry Garfield Liggett was convicted of the killing of Patrick McNeice.
- Dorothy Mullan was convicted of driving the car to the site of Patrick McNeice's killing.
- Garfield Gerard Beattie was convicted of the killings of Denis Mullan, Jim McLoughlin and Patrick McNeice at the Eagle Bar in Charlemont; also convicted of the attempted killings of other patrons in the Eagle Bar.
- David Henry Kane was convicted of the killing of Jim McLoughlin and the attempted killings of the other patrons in the Eagle Bar.
- Joey Lutton — UDR soldier convicted of the attacks on the Eagle Bar and Clancy's Bar in Charlemont.
- Samuel Fulton Neill (died 25 January 1976) — brother-in-law of Robin Jackson, arrested in 1975 alongside Jackson and Thomas Crozier in possession of four shotguns. He was fatally shot five times in the head after leaving a Portadown pub, allegedly by Jackson, for having passed on information to the police about the people involved in the Miami Showband attack.
- Trevor Barnard was charged along with two others with the kidnapping of two bread deliverymen. The kidnapping charge was also linked to a bomb attack at Mourne Crescent in Dungannon.
- Laurence Tate — UDR soldier. He was convicted along with two others of the bombing of an empty bungalow near Dungannon. He was also convicted of the bombing of Killen's Bar in Dungannon. He was arrested as part of the Miami Showband investigation.
- Harold Henry McKay was convicted along with two others of the bombing of an empty bungalow near Dungannon. Also convicted of the bombing of Killen's Bar in Dungannon. He was arrested as part of the Miami Showband investigation.
- John Nimmons was convicted along with two others of the bombing of an empty bungalow near Dungannon. Also convicted of the bombing of Killen's Bar in Dungannon. He was arrested as part of the Miami Showband investigation.
- William Thomas Leonard — UDR soldier convicted of the killings of James and Gertrude Devlin, a married couple. He was also convicted of the bombing of Killen's Bar in Dungannon and of the armed robbery of the CIÉ bus in Aughnacloy which caused approximately £12,000 worth of damage to it.
- Sammy McCoo was named by McClure and Shields as being involved in the attack on Donnelly's bar. McCoo's name later appeared on the Garda suspects list for the Dublin and Monaghan bombings.
- Ian Mitchell — RUC officer, received a two-year sentence, suspended for three years in relation to the attack on the Rock Bar. Ian Mitchell was one of the investigating officers into the killings of Betty McDonald and Gerald McGleenan at the Step Inn, Keady, County Armagh.
- David Wilson — RUC officer, received a one-year sentence, suspended for two years in relation to the attack on the Rock Bar.
- Alexander McCaughey — father of Billy McCaughey, given a one-year suspended sentence in relation to the kidnapping of Fr. Murphy.

The gang has also been linked to military intelligence liaison officer Captain Robert Nairac who worked for 14th Intelligence Company (The Det). On The Hidden Hand programme made by Yorkshire Television in 1993, it was claimed that Robin Jackson was controlled by Nairac and 14th Intelligence. In May 1977, Nairac was kidnapped by the IRA in Dromintee and taken across the border into the Republic where he was interrogated for more than an hour and pistol-whipped in Ravensdale Woods, County Louth. Nairac was then shot dead by Liam Townson.

Merlyn Rees, Secretary of State for Northern Ireland, lifted the proscription against the UVF on 4 April 1974, but it was made illegal once again on 3 October 1975; therefore, during the period between April 1974 and October 1975, membership of the UVF was not a crime. The largest loyalist paramilitary group in Northern Ireland, the Ulster Defence Association (UDA) was also not proscribed at the time.

== Attacks attributed to the Glenanne gang ==
In 2004, the Pat Finucane Centre asked Professor Douglas Cassel (formerly of Northwestern University School of Law in Chicago) to convene an international inquiry to investigate collusion by members of the British security forces in sectarian killings in Northern Ireland committed during the mid-1970s. The gang's involvement in the killings was to be investigated in particular.

The panel interviewed victims and their relatives, as well as four members of the security forces. The four members of the security forces were: RUC SPG officers John Weir and Billy McCaughey; psychological warfare operative Colin Wallace and MI6 operative Captain Fred Holroyd. They all implicated the Glenanne gang in the attacks. In seven out of eight cases, ballistic tests corroborated Weir's claims linking the killings to weapons carried by the security forces. The interviews revealed many similarities in the way the attacks were carried out, while various documents (including the Barron Report) established a chain of ballistic history linking weapons and killings to the gang. Justice Barron commented in reference to the gang

This joining of RUC and UDR members with members of Loyalist paramilitary organisations is emphasised by the use of the same or connected guns by intermingled groups of these organisations.

The Glenanne gang has been linked to the following attacks and/or incidents:

=== 1972 and 1973 ===
- 4 October 1972: killing of Catholic civilian Patrick Connolly. He was killed and his mother and brother were injured when a grenade was thrown through the window of their house in Portadown, County Armagh. The family were Catholics living in a mixed area of the town. The grenade was of a type manufactured in the United Kingdom "for use by the British Armed Forces". According to loyalist sources, UVF members were responsible.
- 20 February 1973: an armed robbery on a CIÉ bus in Aughnacloy, which caused approximately £12,000 worth of damage to the bus.
- 10 March 1973: attempted murder of Patrick Turley in Portadown and armed robbery, for which Glenanne gang members were later jailed.
- 24 May 1973: bombing of Killen's Bar in Dungannon, County Tyrone. UDR soldiers Laurence Tate and William Thomas Leonard were convicted, along with two others.
- 1981: attempted killings of Bernadette Devlin McAliskey and her husband at their home in Coalisland, County Tyrone.
- 5 August 1973: killing of Catholic civilians Francis and Bernadette Mullen. They were shot dead by two gunmen at their farmhouse in Broughadoey, near Moy, County Tyrone. Their two-year-old son was also wounded by gunfire. The "Ulster Freedom Fighters" claimed responsibility but it is believed UVF members were responsible.
- 28 October 1973: killing of Catholic civilian Francis McCaughey. He was wounded by a booby-trap bomb at a farm in Carnteel, near Aughnacloy, County Tyrone. He died on 8 November. The "Ulster Freedom Fighters" claimed responsibility but it is believed UVF members were responsible. His brother-in-law, Owen Boyle, was later shot dead by the Glenanne gang.
- 29 October 1973: killing of Catholic civilian Patrick Campbell. He was shot dead by a gunman who arrived at the door of his house in Banbridge, County Down. The "Ulster Freedom Fighters" claimed responsibility but it later emerged that UVF members had been responsible. Although Robin Jackson was arrested and Campbell's widow picked him out as the killer at an identity parade, murder charges against him were soon dropped.

=== 1974 ===
- 17 January 1974: gun attack on Boyle's Bar in Cappagh, County Tyrone. Two gunmen entered the pub and opened fire indiscriminately on the customers. Catholic civilian Daniel Hughes was killed and three others wounded.
- 19 February 1974: bomb attack on Traynor's Bar at Aghinlig, between Blackwatertown and Charlemont, County Armagh. Catholic civilian Patrick Molloy and Protestant civilian John Wylie were killed. Two other civilians were wounded. In 1981 a serving UDR soldier, a former UDR soldier and a former UVF member were convicted of the murders.
- 7 May 1974: killing of Catholic civilians James and Gertrude Devlin, who were shot dead near their home at Congo Road, near Dungannon, County Tyrone. They were driving home with their 17-year-old daughter. As they neared their house, a man in a military uniform stopped the car and opened fire on them. James and Gertrude were killed outright and their daughter, Patricia, in the back seat, was wounded. UDR soldier William Thomas Leonard was convicted for the killings. His membership in the UDR was withheld from the courts by the police.
- 17 May 1974: Dublin and Monaghan bombings, in which 33 civilians were killed (see below).
- 3 September 1974: shooting of T.J. Chambers in Mountnorris, County Armagh. The 9 mm Luger pistol used in the incident was the same often used in other Glenanne gang attacks.
- 27 October 1974: killing of Catholic civilian Anthony Duffy. His body was found at the back of a farmhouse at Mullantine, near Portadown, County Armagh. He had been beaten, strangled and then shot by UVF members after taking a lift from Lurgan to Portadown, together with a friend who managed to escape.
- 20 November 1974: gun attack on Falls Bar at Aughamullen, near Clonoe, County Tyrone. Catholic civilian Patrick Falls was killed and another wounded. UDR soldier James Somerville was convicted for the attack.
- 29 November 1974: attacks in Newry and Crossmaglen, County Armagh. A bomb exploded in a hallway of Hughes' Bar in Newry, injuring many people. Catholic civilian John Mallon died of his injuries on 15 December. At the inquest an RUC witness said the pub was used by all sections of the community and had no links with any organisation. Another bomb exploded in the hallway of McArdle's Bar, Crossmaglen, injuring six. Catholic civilian Thomas McNamee died from his injuries almost a year later, on 14 November 1975. According to reliable loyalist sources, UVF members were responsible for both attacks.

=== 1975 ===
- 10 January 1975: killing of IRA volunteer John Francis Green, who was found shot dead at a farmhouse in Tullynageer near Castleblayney, County Monaghan. In his statement, Weir claims that the gunmen were Robin Jackson, Robert McConnell and Harris Boyle.
- 10 February 1975: gun attack on Hayden's Bar in Gortavale, near Rock, County Tyrone. A gunman entered the pub and opened fire indiscriminately on the customers. Catholic civilians Arthur Mulholland and Eugene Doyle were killed while four others were wounded.
- 19 February 1975: Civilian Jim Breen shot dead as he answered his front door with his 8-year-old son beside him. Lurgan, County Armagh. Gunman named as Robin Jackson.
- 1 April 1975: killing of Catholic civilian Dorothy Trainor. She and her husband were shot by at least two gunmen as they walked through a park near Garvaghy Road, Portadown. Two of her sons were later killed by loyalists. The Protestant Action Force claimed responsibility.
- 3 April 1975: killing of Catholic civilian Martin McVeigh. He was shot dead near his home at Ballyoran Park, off the Garvaghy Road in Portadown, as he cycled home from work. Robin Jackson was later arrested in possession of the murder weapon, but the RUC did not question or charge him with the murder. The Protestant Action Force claimed responsibility.
- 11 April 1975: killing of Catholic civilian Owen Boyle. Gunmen shot him through the window of his house in Glencull, near Aughnacloy, County Tyrone. He died on 22 April 1975. The Protestant Action Force claimed responsibility.
- 21 April 1975: killing of Catholic civilians Marion Bowen (who was eight months pregnant) and her brothers, Seamus and Michael McKenna, by a booby-trap bomb left in Bowen's house at Killyliss, near Granville, County Tyrone. Seamus and Michael were renovating the house, which had been unoccupied for almost a year. The Protestant Action Force claimed responsibility.
- 27 April 1975: gun attack on a social club in Bleary, County Down. Gunmen burst into the Catholic-frequented darts club and opened fire indiscriminately. Catholic civilians Joseph Toman, John Feeney and Brendan O'Hara were killed while others were wounded. The Protestant Action Force claimed responsibility.
- 24 May 1975: bomb attack on the home of the Grew family in Moy, County Tyrone. Much of the house was destroyed and six children were injured. In 1981 a serving UDR soldier, a former UDR soldier and a former UVF member were convicted of partaking in the attack.
- 31 July 1975: Miami Showband killings at Buskhill, County Down (see below)
- 1 August 1975: gun attack on a minibus near Gilford, County Down. The minibus had been travelling from Banbridge to Bleary with nine people on board; all were Catholics and most had been returning from a regular bingo session. Like the Miami Showband attack, gunmen in British Army uniforms stopped the minibus at a fake military checkpoint. They then opened fire, wounding seven people. Catholic civilian Joseph Toland was killed outright and another Catholic civilian, James Marks, died of his wounds in January 1976. According to loyalist sources, UVF members were responsible.
- 2 August 1975: shooting at Fane Valley Park, Altnamacken, County Armagh.
- 22 August 1975: gun and bomb attack on McGleenan's Bar in the city of Armagh. A masked gunman burst into the crowded pub and opened fire while another planted a bomb. It exploded as they ran to a getaway car, causing the building to collapse. Catholic civilians John McGleenan, Patrick Hughes and Thomas Morris were killed while many others were injured. According to reliable loyalist sources, UVF members were responsible.
- 24 August 1975: killing of Catholic civilians Colm McCartney and Sean Farmer, who were found shot dead at Altnamacken, near Newtownhamilton, County Armagh. They were driving home from a Gaelic football match in Dublin when they were apparently stopped at a fake military checkpoint by men wearing British Army uniforms. They were found shot dead a short distance away. Earlier that night, three RUC officers in an unmarked car had been stopped at the same checkpoint but had been allowed through. However, the officers suspected that the checkpoint had been fake. After receiving radio confirmation that there were no authorised checkpoints in the area that night, they reported the incident and requested help from the British Army to investigate it, but no investigation was undertaken. The HET said the original police investigation "barely existed", describing the RUC's failure to interview eyewitnesses as "inexplicable". Weir claims that an RUC officer confessed to partaking in the attack, alongside a UDR soldier and UVF members. The Protestant Action Force claimed responsibility.
- 1 September 1975: killing of SDLP member Denis Mullen, who was shot dead by two gunmen who called at the door of his home in Collegeland, just outside Charlemont in the north-west of County Armagh.
- 4 September 1975: gun and bomb attack on McCann's Bar in Ballyhegan, County Armagh. Eleven people were wounded and Catholic civilian Margaret Hale died of her wounds on 22 September.
- 23 October 1975: killing of Catholic civilians Peter and Jane McKearney. They were shot dead by gunmen who arrived at the door of their house in Listamlat, near Moy, County Tyrone. The gunmen may have mistaken the couple for the parents of an IRA member with the same surname – Margaret McKearney – but they were not related. Margaret McKearney was wanted by Scotland Yard and the UVF had threatened to "eliminate" her. A contemporary newspaper article reported that "Army issue ammunition" was used. Among the first on the scene were neighbours Charles and Teresa Fox, who were both later killed by the UVF in 1992.
- 29 November 1975: Dublin Airport bombing. John Hayes, an airport worker and father of 3 was killed in the attack. Nobody has been charged with the murder.
- 19 December 1975: attacks in Dundalk and Silverbridge. At 6:20pm, a car bomb exploded outside Kay's Tavern in Dundalk, Co Louth on the southern side of the border. Catholic civilians Hugh Watters and Jack Rooney were killed and more than twenty others were injured. Three hours later, gunmen attacked Donnelly's Bar and filling station in Silverbridge, less than ten miles away on the northern side of the border. They fired at people outside the building, then fired on the customers and threw a bomb inside. Two Catholic civilians (Patrick and Michael Donnelly) and an English civilian (Trevor Brecknell, married to a local woman) were killed. The "Red Hand Commando" claimed both attacks and it is believed they were co-ordinated. It is believed the Siverbridge attack was carried out by the Glenanne gang while the Dundalk bombing was carried out by other members of the Mid Ulster UVF, probably with some help from Belfast UVF members. RUC officer Laurence McClure admitted involvement in the Silverbridge attack. UDR Corporal Robert McConnell was also involved, according to John Weir and Lily Shields. Credible evidence from the RUC officer who led the investigation indicates that police believed they knew who the killers were and that the killers included RUC and UDR officers. The RUC refused the Garda Síochána access to a key witness in the Dundalk bombing.

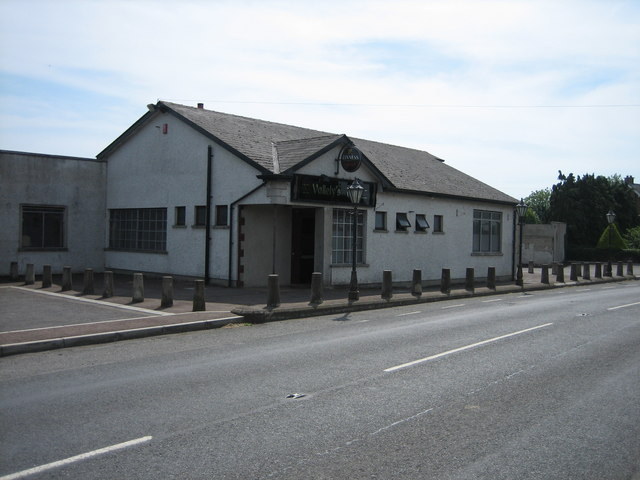
Vallely's pub in Ardress

- 26 December 1975: car bomb attack on Vallelly's Bar, Ardress, County Armagh. Catholic civilian Seamus Mallon was killed and three others injured.

=== 1976 ===
- 4 January 1976: Reavey and O'Dowd killings. At about 6pm, gunmen broke into the Reavey family home in Whitecross, County Armagh. They shot brothers John, Brian and Anthony Reavey. John and Brian were killed outright while Anthony died of a brain hemorrhage less than a month later. Twenty minutes after the shooting, gunmen broke into the O'Dowd family home in Ballydougan, about twenty miles away. They shot dead Joseph O'Dowd and his nephews Barry and Declan O'Dowd. All three were members of the SDLP. Barney O'Dowd was wounded by gunfire. RUC officer Billy McConnell admitted taking part in the Reavey killings and accused RUC Reserve officer James Mitchell of being involved too. According to Weir, UDR Corporal Robert McConnell was the lead gunman in the Reavey killings and Robin Jackson was the lead gunman in the O'Dowd killings. The Protestant Action Force claimed responsibility for the two co-ordinated attacks.
- 7 March 1976: car bomb attack on the Three Star Inn, Castleblayney, County Monaghan. Civilian Patrick Mone was killed and 26 others were injured. The main target of the bomb may have been the Derry to Dublin bus, which was due to arrive when the bomb detonated and stop where the car bomb was parked. However, the bus was delayed by a Garda checkpoint. According to Weir, the attack was carried out by RUC officer Laurence McClure and UDR soldier Robert McConnell, using explosives provided by UDR Captain John Irwin and stored beforehand at James Mitchell's farmhouse. A memorial to Patrick Mone is near the site of the bombing in Castleblayney.
- 8 March 1976: bomb and gun attack on Tully's Bar in Belleeks, County Armagh. RUC officer John Weir admitted helping to plan the attack and accused RUC Reserve officer James Mitchell of being the mastermind.
- 17 March 1976: car bomb attack on the Hillcrest Bar in Dungannon on Saint Patrick's Day. Four Catholic civilians – Joseph Kelly, Andrew Small and 13-year-olds Patrick Bernard and James McCaughey – were killed. Twelve others were injured.
- 15 May 1976: attacks in Charlemont, County Armagh. Gunmen detonated a bomb in the hallway of Clancy's Bar, killing three Catholic civilians (Felix Clancy, Sean O'Hagan and Robert McCullough) and injuring many others. They then shot into the nearby Eagle Bar, killing a Catholic civilian, Frederick McLoughlin, and wounding several others. Locals claimed that the UDR had been patrolling the village for a number of nights beforehand, but were absent the night of the attacks. UDR soldier Joey Lutton was later convicted of partaking in both attacks. His status as a member of the security forces was withheld from the courts by the police.
- 5 June 1976: attack on the Rock Bar near Keady, County Armagh. Gunmen arrived at the pub and shot Catholic civilian Michael McGrath in the street outside. They then fired at customers through the windows and threw a nail bomb inside, but it only partially exploded. The HET said the RUC investigation is "cursory, ineffective and even fails to interview the only witness, who survived being shot down". RUC officers William McCaughey, Laurence McClure and Ian Mitchell confessed and were convicted for the attack, while RUC officer David Wilson was convicted for withholding knowledge that the attack was to take place. However, only McCaughey served time in prison. According to the book Lethal Allies, the officers were wearing their police uniforms underneath boiler suits.
- 25 July 1976: killing of Catholic civilian Patrick McNeice, shot dead at his home in Ardress, County Armagh.
- 16 August 1976: car bomb attack on the Step Inn, Keady, County Armagh. Catholic civilians Elizabeth McDonald and Gerard McGleenon were killed and others were injured. Ten days before the bombing, the RUC asked the Army to put Mitchell's farmhouse under surveillance because they had intelligence that a bomb was being stored there. According to Weir, the bomb was to be detonated at Renaghan's Bar across the border in Clontibret, County Monaghan. On 15 August, Weir scouted the route to the pub but was stopped by Gardaí, who told him they were mounting extra security due to a warning from the RUC. Weir told the rest of the gang and they decided to attack Keady instead. The Army surveillance operation was ended and the bomb attack went ahead. Weir, Mitchell and the others involved were not arrested by the RUC and were allowed to remain in the force.

=== 1977 onward ===
- 25 February 1977: killing of Catholic RUC officer Joseph Campbell, who was shot dead outside the RUC base in Cushendall, County Antrim. Weir claims that the killers were alleged RUC Special Branch agent Robin Jackson, RUC officer William McCaughey and R.J. Kerr.
- 19 April 1977: killing of Catholic civilian William Strathearn, a chemist, who was shot dead at his shop in Ahoghill, County Antrim. RUC SPG officers John Weir and Billy McCaughey were convicted for the killing.
- 18 June 1978: kidnapping of Father Hugh Murphy in Ahoghill. This was in retaliation for the IRA's kidnapping and killing of an RUC officer the day before. Murphy was eventually released unharmed after appeals from a number of Protestant ministers, including Ian Paisley. Sergeant Gary Armstrong and Constable Billy McCaughey, both of the RUC (along with the latter's father, Alexander McCaughey), were convicted for the kidnapping.
- 29 February 1980: killing of Catholic civilian Brendan McLaughlin, who was killed in a drive-by-shooting on Clonard Street, Belfast. He was killed with the same Sterling submachine gun used in the Miami Showband, O'Dowd family and Devlin family killings.
Glenanne gang weapons linked to attacks

Attack	Date	.455 Webley revolver (1)	9 mm Luger pistol Serial No. U 4 (1)	9mm Luger pistol (2)	.38 ACP pistol	.455 Webley revolver (2)	9 mm Sterling SMG (1)	9 mm Sterling SMG (2)	9 mm SMG (3)	9mm SMG (4)	Star pistol	9 mm Emra SMG	.45 ACP Colt pistol
Patrick Turley	10 March 1973										X		
Loughgall shooting	24 March 1973										X		
Argory shooting	13 June 1973	X											
McAliskey family	4 August 1973												
Mullan family	5 August 1973	X											
Boyle's Bar	17 January 1974	X											
Devlin family	7 May 1974	X					X						
T.J. Chambers	3 September 1974			X		X							
Shooting incident	3 September 1974			X									
Falls Bar	20 November 1974	X											
Newtownhamilton shooting	8 December 1974			X									X
John Francis Green	10 January 1975		X			X					X		
Trainor family	1 April 1975										X		
Owen Boyle	11 April 1975	X											
Glenside Bar	7 May 1975							X					
Miami Showband	31 July 1975		X		X		X						
Altnamacken shooting	2 August 1975					X							
McCartney/Farmer	24 August 1975			X		X							X
Denis Mullen	1 September 1975							X					
McKearney family	23 October 1975				X			X				X	
Donnelly's Bar	19 December 1975							X					
O'Dowd family	4 January 1976						X						
Reavey family	4 January 1976			X		X		X	X				
Eagle Bar	15 May 1976							X					
Rock Bar	5 June 1976			X					X				
Patrick McNeice	25 July 1976							X					
William Strathearn	19 April 1977												X
Ahoghill shooting	23 June 1977												X
Brendan McLaughlin	29 February 1980						X						

=== The Glenanne farm and the Dublin and Monaghan bombings ===
James Mitchell, RUC reserve officer and owner of the Glenanne farm

According to the Barron Report, Billy Hanna had asked James Mitchell for permission to use his farm as a UVF arms dump and bomb-making site. Information that loyalist paramilitaries were regularly meeting at the farm appeared on British Intelligence Corps documents from late 1972. According to submissions received by Mr Justice Barron, the Glenanne farm was used to build and store the bombs that exploded in Dublin and Monaghan. The report states they were placed onto Robin Jackson's poultry lorry, driven across the border to a carpark, then activated by Hanna and transferred to three allocated cars. These cars exploded almost simultaneously in Dublin's city centre at about 5.30pm during evening rush hour, killing 26 civilians. Ninety minutes later a fourth car bomb exploded in Monaghan, killing another seven civilians.

Mitchell and his female housekeeper, Lily Shields both denied knowledge that the farm was used for illicit paramilitary activity. They also denied partaking in any UVF attacks. In his affidavit, John Weir affirms that the farmhouse was used as a base for UVF operations that included the Dublin and Monaghan bombings. Weir also stated that on one occasion an RUC constable gave him two weapons to store at the Glenanne farm:

He then offered me the two sub-machine guns because he knew about my connection to Loyalist paramilitaries. I accepted them and took them to Mitchell's farmhouse.

In his affidavit, Weir recounted when in March 1976 he had gone to the farm where between eight and ten men dressed in camouflage had been parading in the farmyard. Inside he had discussed with Mitchell and others the details of a planned bombing and shooting attack against a nationalist pub, Tully's in Belleeks. Mitchell had shown him the floor plans of the pub's interior which he had drawn up highlighting the lack of escape routes for the pub's patrons. The plan was temporarily called off when it was discovered that the British Army's Parachute Regiment was on patrol that evening in the area. Weir returned to Belfast the next day and the attack went ahead that evening, 8 March. There were no casualties, however, as Mitchell's floor plans had been inaccurate and the customers had fled into the pub's living quarters for safety once the shooting had commenced outside; the bomb only caused structural damage to the building.

Mr. Justice Barron concluded in his report:

It is likely that the farm of James Mitchell at Glenanne played a significant part in the preparation for the attacks [Dublin and Monaghan bombings]. It is also likely that members of the UDR and RUC either participated in, or were aware of those preparations.

In May 2024 Iain Livingstone, head of Operation Denton, said that there was no doubt of collusion between the Glenanne gang and British authorities in the Dublin and Monaghan bombings.

=== Miami Showband massacre ===
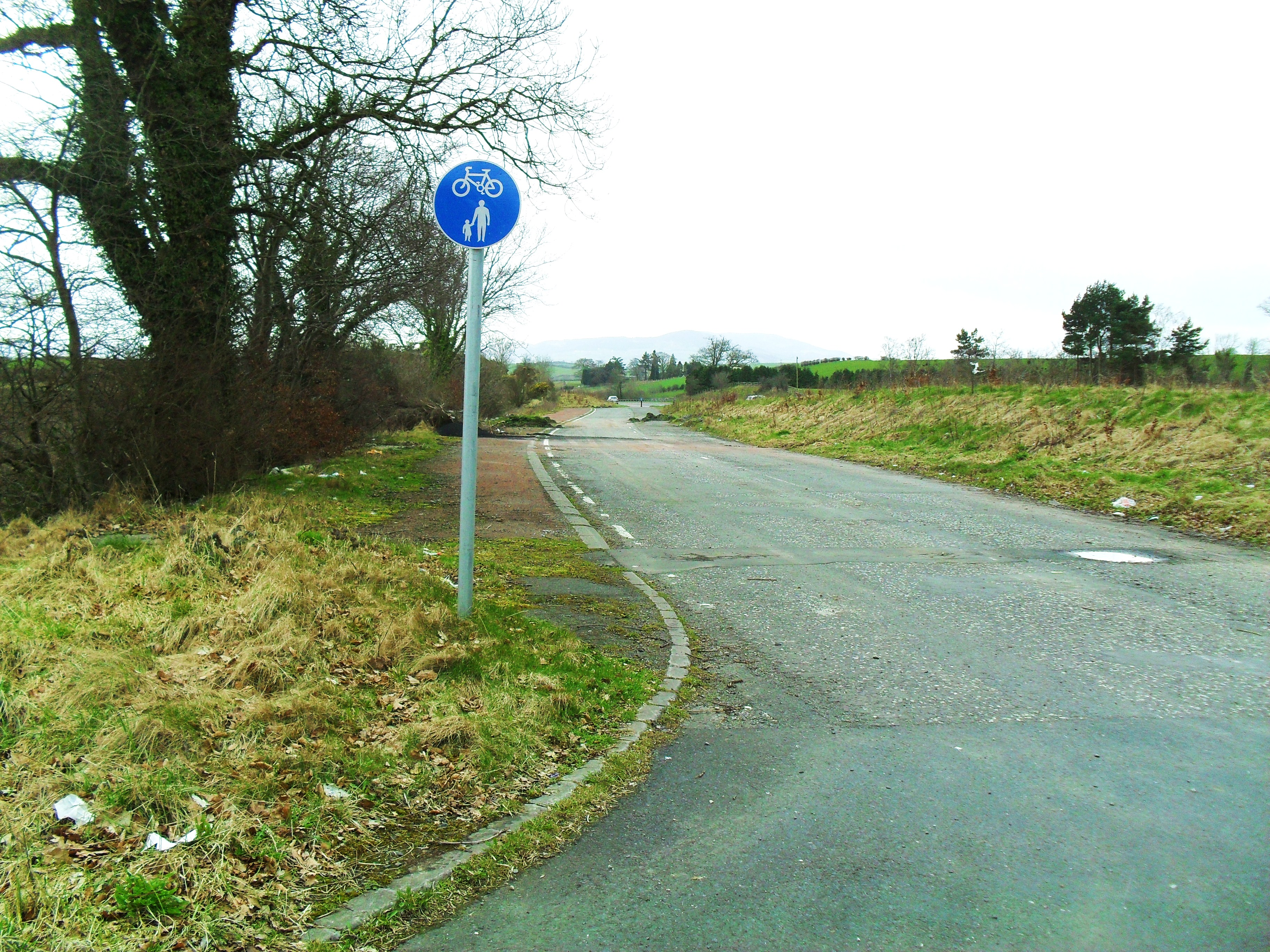
Site of the Miami Showband killings, in which the Glenanne gang was implicated

On 31 July 1975, four days after Hanna's shooting and Jackson's assumption of leadership of the Mid-Ulster brigade, the Miami Showband's minibus was flagged-down outside Newry by armed UVF men wearing British Army uniforms at a bogus military checkpoint. Two UVF men (Harris Boyle and Wesley Somerville) loaded a time delay bomb on the minibus but it exploded prematurely and killed them. The remaining UVF gunmen then opened fire on the bandmembers, killing three (Brian McCoy, Anthony Geraghty and Fran O'Toole) and wounding two (Stephen Travers and Des McAlea). Two of the three men convicted of the killings and sentenced to life imprisonment were serving members of the UDR, while the third was a former member. The Luger pistol used in the attack was found to have been the same one used to kill Provisional IRA member John Francis Green in January 1975 and was also used in the O'Dowd killings of January 1976. The following May, the security forces found Jackson's fingerprints on a home-made silencer attached to a Luger. Although charged, Jackson avoided conviction. A Sterling 9mm submachine gun was also used in the Miami Showband killings. The 2003 Barron Report suggests that the guns were taken from the stockpile of weapons at the Glenanne farm. The Luger pistol used in the Green, Miami Showband and O'Dowd attacks was later destroyed by the RUC on 28 August 1978.

Liaison officer Captain Robert Nairac has been linked to the Miami Showband killings and the killing of John Francis Green. Miami Showband survivors Stephen Travers and Des McAlea both testified in court that a man with a "crisp, clipped English accent, and wearing a different uniform and beret" had been at the scene of the explosion and subsequent shootings. Martin Dillon in The Dirty War, however, adamantly states that Nairac was not involved in either attack. The Cassel Report concluded that there was "credible evidence that the principal perpetrator [of the Miami Showband attack] was a man who was not prosecuted – alleged RUC Special Branch agent Robin Jackson". Although Jackson had been questioned by the RUC following the Showband attack, he was released without having been charged.

=== Reavey and O'Dowd killings and the Kingsmill massacre ===
The co-ordinated sectarian shootings of the Reavey and O'Dowd families, allegedly perpetrated by the Glenanne gang and organised by Robin Jackson, was followed the next day by the Kingsmill massacre. On 5 January 1976, gunmen from the Provisional IRA stopped a minibus carrying eleven Protestant men home from their workplace in Glenanne. The gunmen lined them up alongside it and shot them, killing ten. The "South Armagh Republican Action Force" claimed responsibility, saying that the shooting was retaliation for a string of attacks on Catholic civilians in the area by loyalists, particularly the Reavey and O'Dowd killings. A 2011 Historical Enquiries Team (HET) report however found that Kingsmill had been planned in advance of these killings.

In 2001, an unidentified former Glenanne gang member (a former RUC officer sentenced to life imprisonment for his part in the gang's killings) revealed that the gang had planned to kill thirty Catholic schoolchildren as revenge for Kingsmill. It planned to attack St Lawrence O'Toole Primary School in the South Armagh village of Belleeks. The attack was allegedly called off because the UVF leadership ruled it would be "morally unacceptable" and would lead to a harsh IRA response and likely civil war. Allegedly, the leadership also suspected that the member who suggested the attack was working with British Military Intelligence, and that Military Intelligence were seeking to provoke a civil war. Former Glenanne gang member Billy McCaughey admitted the plot in a 2004 documentary.

== Convictions ==
The Cassel Report states that convictions were obtained in only nine of the 25 cases it investigated and that several of those convictions are suspect as erroneous and incomplete. A month before Nairac's killing, a Catholic chemist, William Strathearn, was gunned down at his home in Ahoghill, County Antrim. SPG officers Weir and McCaughey were charged and convicted for the killing. Weir named Jackson as having been the gunman but Jackson was never interrogated for "reasons of operational strategy". The Special Patrol Group was disbanded in 1980 by the RUC after the convictions of Weir and McCaughey for the Strathearn killing.

In December 1978 the authorities raided the Glenanne farm and found weapons and ammunition. This made it necessary for the gang to seek an alternative base of operations and arms dump. James Mitchell was charged and convicted of storing weapons on his land. Northern Ireland's Lord Chief Justice Robert Lowry presided over his trial on 30 June 1980. The farm had been under RUC observation for several months before the raid.

On 16 October 1979, Robin Jackson was arrested when he was found with a number of weapons and hoods. In January 1981 he was sentenced to seven years imprisonment for possession of guns and ammunition, but was then released in May 1983. John Weir stated that the Glenanne gang usually did not use the name "UVF" whenever it claimed its attacks; instead it typically employed the cover names of Red Hand Commando, Red Hand Brigade or Protestant Action Force.

== Later developments ==
The circumstances of a number of the murders attributed to the Glenanne gang were re-investigated by the PSNI Historical Enquiries Team, established in 2005 to investigate unsolved murders committed between 1968 and 1998, with a particular brief to investigate any evidence of state involvement in such killings. In addition to reports on individual murders, assurances were given that the HET would also produce an overarching report into the pattern of activities of the gang as a whole. By May 2010 about 80% of this report had been completed.

However, in early 2014 it became clear that the HET was no longer proceeding with the broader review; later that year, due to budget cuts, the HET was wound up altogether, with its remaining activities absorbed back into the PSNI with a much narrowed remit.

In February 2015 relatives of victims of the gang won an application for a judicial review of this decision at the High Court in Belfast. This review found, in July 2017, that the decision by PSNI Chief Constable Matt Baggott had effectively prevented an "overarching thematic report" into the activities of the Glenanne gang had breached the victims' families' rights as defined in Article 2 of the European Convention on Human Rights.

The Court had been told that there was evidence of collusion by elements of the British state in at least three of the cases and Mr. Justice Treacy said that there was a "credible expectation of collusion" in the remaining cases. Therefore, he concluded, the decision of the Chief Constable to end the broader review into the activities of the Glenanne gang and the alleged collusion of elements of the British state in those murders had resulted in a "real risk that this will fuel in the minds of the families the fear that the state has resiled from its public commitments because it is not genuinely committed to addressing the unresolved concerns that the families have of state involvement". Mr Justice Treacy gave the parties until the start of September 2017 to try to reach an agreement on the appropriate form of relief. In November 2017 Mr Justice Treacy gave further judgement, confirming that he would be issuing an order of mandamus that would require compliance by the Chief Constable and the PSNI.

An appeal by the Chief Constable against the decision was heard in April 2018, amid claims that an outsourced investigation would cost £60 million.

In 2018, the documentary film Unquiet Graves was released, with testimony from several people involved. It came to wider public attention after being shown on RTÉ One (Republic of Ireland state television) in 2020.

In July 2019 the Court of Appeal ruled that a full, independent inquiry into allegations of collusion between security services and the Glenanne gang should be held.

In February 2020 the terms of reference for a review into the activities of the gang were agreed. Former Bedfordshire Police chief Jon Boutcher is heading the review. Boutcher had previously headed an inquiry into allegations that multiple murders had been committed by the British agent known as Stakeknife.

== See also ==
- Shankill Butchers
- Timeline of Ulster Volunteer Force actions

== Bibliography ==
- Tiernan, Joe (2000). The Dublin Bombings and the Murder Triangle. Mercier Press. ISBN 1856353206
- Cadwallader, Anne (2013) Lethal Allies - British Collusion in Ireland. Ireland: Mercier Press. ISBN 1781171882
