= Reavey and O'Dowd killings =

1976 gun attacks in Northern Ireland

- Part of the Troubles
- Location: Whitecross and Ballydougan, County Armagh, Northern Ireland
- Date: 4 January 1976; 18:10 and 18:20 (GMT)
- Attack type: Mass shooting, familicide
- Deaths: 6
- Injuries: 1
- Perpetrator: Ulster Volunteer Force

On 4 January 1976, seven Irish Catholic civilians—three members of the Reavey family in Whitecross and four members of the O'Dowd family in Ballydougan—were shot in their homes in County Armagh, Northern Ireland, by members of the Ulster Volunteer Force (UVF), an Ulster loyalist paramilitary group. Two of the Reaveys and three of the O'Dowds were killed outright, with the third Reavey victim dying of brain haemorrhage almost a month later.

The shootings were part of a string of attacks on Catholics and Irish nationalists by the "Glenanne gang"; an alliance of loyalist militants, rogue British soldiers and Royal Ulster Constabulary (RUC) police officers. Billy McCaughey, an officer from the Special Patrol Group, admitted taking part and accused another officer of involvement. His colleague John Weir said those involved included a British soldier, two police officers and an alleged police agent: Robin 'the Jackal' Jackson.

The next day, republican gunmen shot dead ten Protestant civilians. This was claimed as retaliation for the Reavey and O'Dowd shootings, and was the climax of a string of tit-for-tat killings in the area during the mid-1970s.

== Background ==
In February 1975, the Provisional IRA and the British Government entered into a truce and restarted negotiations. For the duration of the truce, the IRA agreed to halt its attacks on the British security forces, and the security forces mostly ended their raids and searches. However, there were dissenters on both sides. Some Provisionals wanted no part of the truce, while some British commanders resented being told to stop their operations against the IRA just when they claimed they had the Provisionals on the run. The security forces boosted their intelligence offensive during the truce.

There was a rise in sectarian killings during the truce, which 'officially' lasted until February 1976. Loyalists, fearing they were about to be forsaken by the British government and forced into a united Ireland, increased their attacks on Irish Catholics/Irish nationalists. Loyalists killed 120 Catholics in 1975, the vast majority civilians. They hoped to force the IRA to retaliate and thus end the truce. Some IRA units concentrated on tackling the loyalists. The fall-off of regular operations had caused unruliness within the IRA and some members, with or without permission from higher up, engaged in tit-for-tat killings. Most of the loyalist attacks in the County Armagh area have been linked to the "Glenanne gang"; a secret alliance of loyalist militants, British soldiers and RUC police officers.

- On 27 April 1975, the UVF shot dead three Catholic civilians at a social club in Bleary, near Ballydougan. It has been claimed the Glenanne gang were involved.
- On 31 July, UVF members (some of whom were also British soldiers) shot dead three members of an Irish pop band at Buskhill, near Whitecross. The band's minibus had been stopped at a fake military checkpoint by gunmen in British Army uniforms. There were two further attacks like this in the area over the following month. On 1 August, gunmen opened fire on a minibus outside Gilford, near Ballydougan, killing two Catholics and wounding several other passengers. On 24 August, two Catholics were shot dead after being taken from their car at another fake military checkpoint in Altnamachin. RUC officer John Weir believes that a fellow officer and a British soldier were involved in this shooting. All three attacks have been linked to the Glenanne gang.
- On 22 August, the UVF launched a gun and bomb attack on McGleenan's Bar in Armagh, killing three Catholic civilians and wounding many others. The Glenanne gang has been linked to the attack, which was allegedly retaliation for an IRA attack in Belfast.
- On 1 September, gunmen burst into Tullyvallan Orange Hall (near Whitecross) and shot dead five Protestant civilians, all members of the Orange Order. The "South Armagh Republican Action Force" claimed responsibility.
- On 19 December, loyalists carried out two attacks on either side of the border. Two Catholic civilians were killed and twenty injured when loyalists detonated a car bomb outside a pub in Dundalk, a few miles across the Irish border. Hours later, they killed three more Catholic civilians and wounded six in a gun and bomb attack on a pub in Silverbridge, near Whitecross. It is believed the attacks were coordinated and that the Silverbridge attack involved the Glenanne gang. An RUC officer later admitted involvement and detectives believed other RUC officers and a British soldier were involved.
- On 31 December, three Protestant civilians were killed in a bomb attack on a pub in Gilford, near Ballydougan. The "People's Republican Army" claimed responsibility. It has been reported that the Reavey and O'Dowd killings were retaliation for this bombing.

== Shootings ==
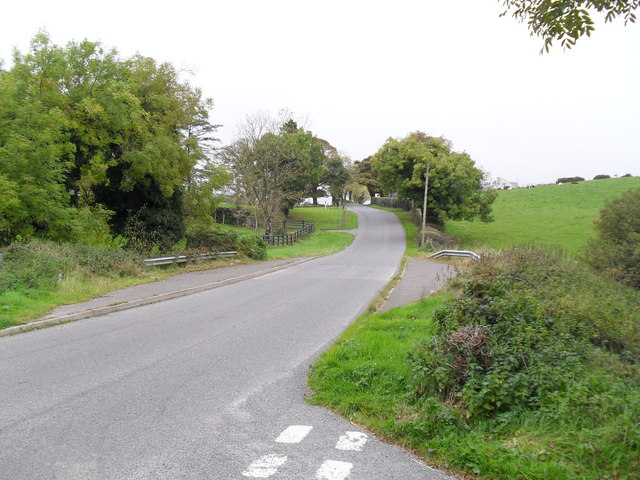
A rural road at Greyhillan (near Whitecross), where the Reavey shootings took place

At about 6:10 pm, at least three masked men entered the home of the Reaveys, a Catholic family, in Whitecross. The door had been left unlocked. Brothers John (24), Brian (22) and Anthony Reavey (17) were alone in the house and were watching television in the sitting room. The gunmen opened fire on them with two 9mm Sterling submachine guns, a 9mm Luger pistol and a .455 Webley revolver. John and Brian were killed outright. Anthony managed to run to the bedroom and take cover under a bed. He was shot several times and left for dead. After searching the house and finding no one else, the gunmen left. Badly wounded, Anthony crawled about 200 yards to a neighbour's house and sought help. He died of a brain haemorrhage on 30 January. Although the pathologist said the shooting played no part in his death, Anthony is listed officially as a victim of the Troubles. A brother, Eugene Reavey, said "Our entire family could have been wiped out. Normally on a Sunday, the twelve of us would have been home, but that night my mother took everybody [else] out to visit my aunt". Neighbours claimed there had been two Royal Ulster Constabulary (RUC) checkpoints set up—one at either end of the road—around the time of the attack. These checkpoints could have stopped passers-by from seeing what was happening. The RUC denied having patrols in the area at the time, but said there could have been checkpoints manned by the British Army's Ulster Defence Regiment (UDR).

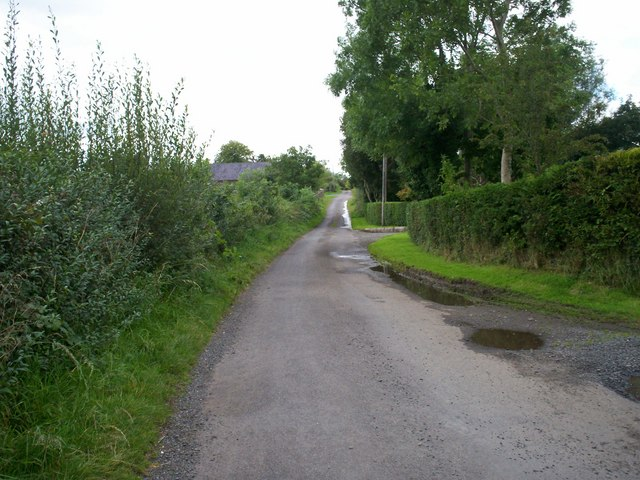
The Slopes, Ballydougan (near Bleary), where the O'Dowd shootings took place

At about 6:20 pm, three masked men burst into the home of the O'Dowds, another Catholic family, in Ballydougan, about fifteen miles away. Sixteen people were in the house for a family reunion. The male family members were in the sitting room with some of the children, playing the piano. The gunmen sprayed the room with bullets, killing Joseph O'Dowd (61) and his nephews Barry (24) and Declan O'Dowd (19). All three were members of the Social Democratic and Labour Party (SDLP) and the family believes this is why they were targeted. Barney O'Dowd (Barry and Declan's father) was also wounded by gunfire. The RUC concluded that the weapon used was a 9mm Sterling submachine gun, although Barney believes a Luger pistol with a suppressor was also used. The gunmen had crossed a field to get to the house, and there is evidence that UDR soldiers had been in the field the day before.

== Perpetrators ==
The killings were claimed by the "Protestant Action Force", a cover name used by members of the UVF.

According to the Reavey and O'Dowd families, the RUC officers sent to investigate the shootings were hostile and unhelpful. The Reavey family claimed the RUC's attitude was that "your brothers were not shot for nothing". The police inquest, however, found that the families had no links with paramilitaries.

The killings were found to be among a string of attacks carried out by the "Glenanne gang"; a secret alliance of UVF members, British soldiers from the Ulster Defence Regiment (UDR), and police officers from the Royal Ulster Constabulary (RUC).

In 1988, while imprisoned, former RUC officer Billy McCaughey (died 2006) admitted being one of the men who took part in the Reavey attack—although he denied firing any shots. At that time he was a member of the RUC's Special Patrol Group (SPG), but in 1980 he was imprisoned for his involvement in the sectarian murder of William Strathearn. McCaughey was not charged in connection with the Reavey shooting. He also claimed that RUC reservist James Mitchell (died 2008) had driven the getaway car, along with his housekeeper Lily Shields. Eugene Reavey, who had worked as a poultry advisor, knew Mitchell and used to visit his farm once a week.

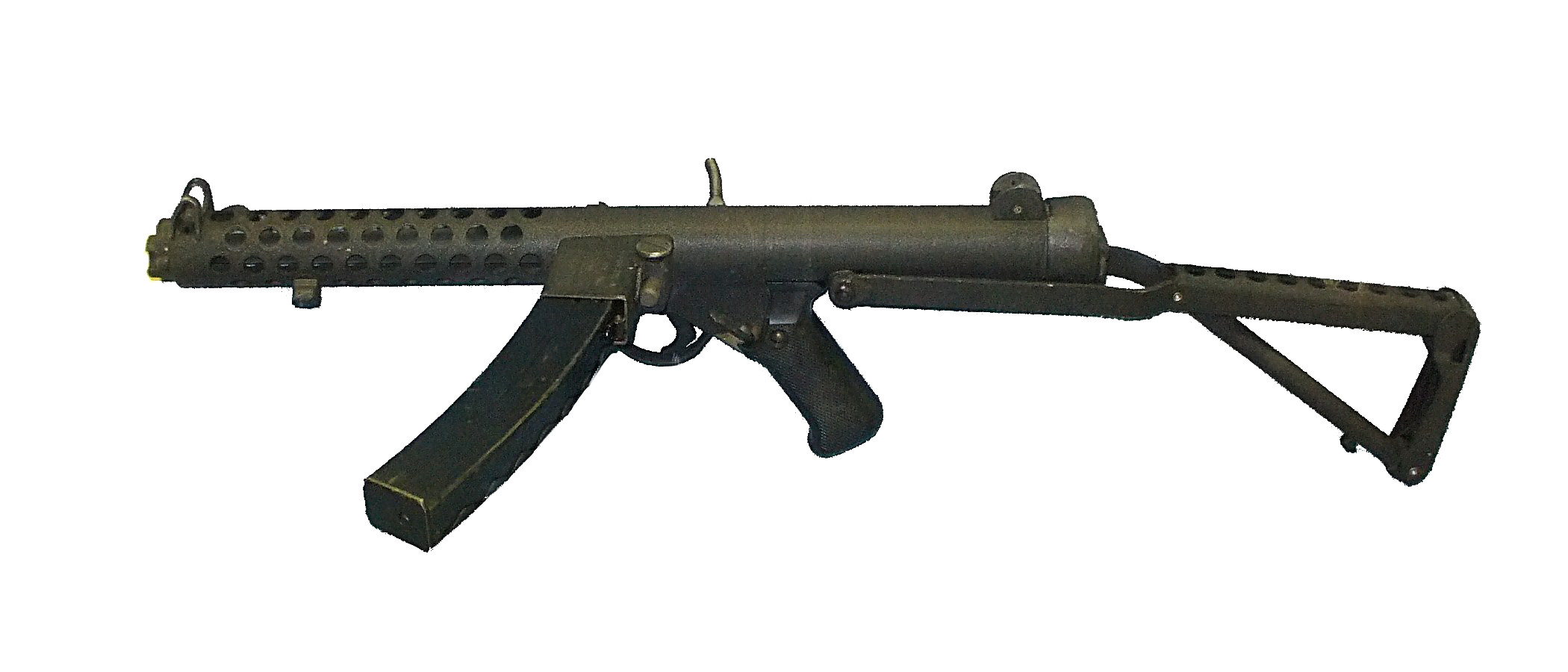
Sterling submachine guns were used in the killings and were later linked to other attacks

RUC SPG officer John Weir, in his affidavit made to Irish Supreme Court Justice Henry Barron, named those involved in the Reavey shootings as Robert McConnell (a soldier of the British Army's Ulster Defence Regiment), Laurence McClure (an RUC SPG officer), James Mitchell, and another man. In a meeting with Eugene Reavey, the RUC officer heading the investigation also named McConnell, McClure and Mitchell as suspects. Anthony Reavey's description of the man carrying the submachine gun closely fits that of McConnell, despite the gunman having worn a black woollen balaclava. McConnell was implicated in the 1974 Dublin car bombings and many sectarian attacks.

In 2021, the Police Ombudsman asked prosecutors to decide whether there was enough evidence to charge a former RUC officer with the Reavey killings.

Weir named Mid-Ulster UVF leader Robin "the Jackal" Jackson (died 1998) as the main gunman in the O'Dowd shootings. Investigating officers told Barney O'Dowd that Jackson was involved but they did not have enough evidence to charge him. Jackson was also named as having a key role in the 1974 Dublin car bombings, Miami Showband massacre and a series of sectarian killings. A number of sources claim he was an RUC Special Branch agent.

Human rights group the Pat Finucane Centre (PFC), along with the families of those killed, have stated their belief that the killings were part of "a security-force-inspired 'dirty war' aimed at terrorising the Catholic/Nationalist community into isolating the IRA" and were "intended to provoke a bloody and ever escalating response" from the IRA. This would then bring about tougher measures against it from both governments, and/or "provoke a civil war". John Weir, a former member of the group who carried out the attacks, said they wanted to provoke a civil war, believing that if civil war erupted they could then "crush the other side".

== Aftermath ==
The next day, gunmen stopped a minibus carrying ten Protestant workmen near Whitecross and shot them dead by the roadside. This became known as the Kingsmill massacre. The "South Armagh Republican Action Force" claimed responsibility, saying it was retaliation for the Reavey and O'Dowd killings. Following the massacre, the British Government declared County Armagh to be a "Special Emergency Area" and announced that the Special Air Service (SAS) was being sent into South Armagh.

Some of the Reavey family came upon the scene of the Kingsmill massacre while driving to the hospital to collect the bodies of John and Brian. Some members of the security forces immediately began a campaign of harassment against the Reavey family, and accused Eugene Reavey of orchestrating the Kingsmill massacre. On their way home from the morgue, the Reavey family were stopped at a checkpoint. Eugene claims the soldiers assaulted and humiliated his mother, put a gun to his back, and danced on his dead brothers' clothes. The harassment would later involve the 3rd Battalion, Parachute Regiment. In 2007, the Police Service of Northern Ireland apologised for the "appalling harassment suffered by the family in the aftermath at the hands of the security forces".

After the killings of the Reavey brothers, their father made his five surviving sons swear not to retaliate or to join any republican paramilitary group.

In 1999, Democratic Unionist Party (DUP) leader Ian Paisley stated in the House of Commons that Eugene Reavey "set up the Kingsmill massacre". In 2010, a report by the police Historical Enquiries Team cleared Eugene of any involvement. The Reavey family sought an apology, but Paisley refused to retract the allegation and died in 2014.

== See also ==
- Timeline of Ulster Volunteer Force actions
