= Mountnorris =

Village in County Armagh, Northern Ireland

Coordinates: 54.25223°N 6.47459°W

Mountnorris: Irish: Achadh na Cranncha
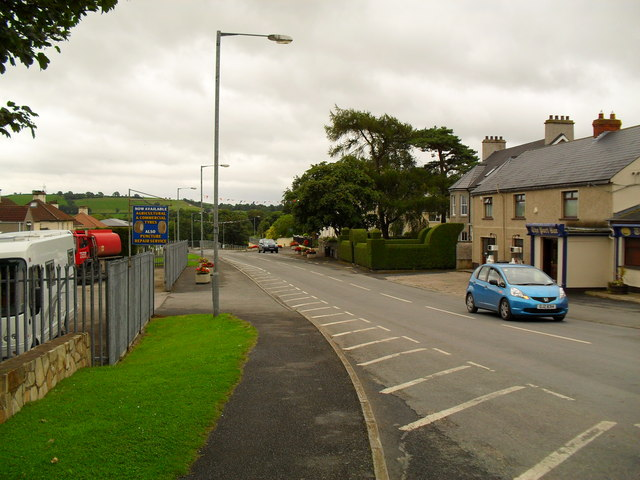
- Main Street

- Location within Northern Ireland
- Population: 155 (2011 Census)
- Irish grid reference: H995348
  - Belfast: 40 mi (64 km)
- District: Armagh City & District
- County: County Armagh
- Country: Northern Ireland
- Sovereign state: United Kingdom
- Post town: ARMAGH
- Postcode district: BT60
- Dialling code: 028, +44 28
- Police: Northern Ireland
- Fire: Northern Ireland
- Ambulance: Northern Ireland
- UK Parliament: Newry & Armagh

Mountnorris is a small village and townland in County Armagh, Northern Ireland. The village also extends into the townland of Tullyherron. It lies about six miles south of Markethill. It is within the Armagh, Banbridge and Craigavon local government area. It had a population of 155 people (79 households) in the 2011 Census. Ulsterbus offers 1 stop in Mountnorris. (2001 Census: 165 people

== History ==
The townland of Mountnorris was historically called Aghnecranagh and Aghenecranagh (from Irish Achadh na Cranncha 'field of the wooded place'). In 1600 Lord Mountjoy built an earthwork fort and left a garrison of 400 men under the command of Captain Edward Blaney in Mountnorris. The area took its name by combining the names of Mountjoy and his campaign commander in the Low Countries, Sir John Norris.

By 1620, the village no longer had a garrison and in the 18th century passed into the hands of the Cope family of Loughgall, to become a rural settlement with no military connections. The village was the originally intended site of the Royal School but due to instability at the time in Ulster, the school was resituated to its current site in Armagh and was opened in 1608.

On 31 May 1991, during "The Troubles", the Provisional IRA carried out a large truck bomb attack against the British Army (Ulster Defence Regiment) base at nearby Glenanne. It killed three soldiers and wounded another ten. It is often called the "Glenanne barracks bombing".

== Climate ==
Climate data for Glenanne (1991–2020 normals)
Month	Jan	Feb	Mar	Apr	May	Jun	Jul	Aug	Sep	Oct	Nov	Dec	Year
Record high °C (°F)	13.5 (56.3)	15.4 (59.7)	18.5 (65.3)	21.1 (70.0)	25.1 (77.2)	29.2 (84.6)	28.5 (83.3)	28.5 (83.3)	25.6 (78.1)	20.3 (68.5)	16.8 (62.2)	14.6 (58.3)	29.2 (84.6)
Mean daily maximum °C (°F)	6.9 (44.4)	7.5 (45.5)	9.3 (48.7)	11.8 (53.2)	14.8 (58.6)	17.2 (63.0)	18.6 (65.5)	18.3 (64.9)	16.1 (61.0)	12.6 (54.7)	9.3 (48.7)	7.1 (44.8)	12.5 (54.5)
Daily mean °C (°F)	4.4 (39.9)	4.7 (40.5)	6.1 (43.0)	8.1 (46.6)	10.7 (51.3)	13.3 (55.9)	14.9 (58.8)	14.7 (58.5)	12.8 (55.0)	9.7 (49.5)	6.7 (44.1)	4.7 (40.5)	9.3 (48.7)
Mean daily minimum °C (°F)	2.0 (35.6)	2.0 (35.6)	2.8 (37.0)	4.4 (39.9)	6.6 (43.9)	9.4 (48.9)	11.2 (52.2)	11.1 (52.0)	9.4 (48.9)	6.9 (44.4)	4.1 (39.4)	2.3 (36.1)	6.0 (42.8)
Record low °C (°F)	−9.5 (14.9)	−5.8 (21.6)	−6.2 (20.8)	−4.4 (24.1)	−1.0 (30.2)	1.4 (34.5)	5.5 (41.9)	3.9 (39.0)	2.2 (36.0)	−0.4 (31.3)	−5.7 (21.7)	−11.6 (11.1)	−11.6 (11.1)
Average precipitation mm (inches)	103.6 (4.08)	82.1 (3.23)	78.2 (3.08)	73.0 (2.87)	68.1 (2.68)	69.8 (2.75)	78.9 (3.11)	84.8 (3.34)	77.4 (3.05)	101.8 (4.01)	108.1 (4.26)	107.9 (4.25)	1,033.5 (40.69)
Average precipitation days (≥ 1.0 mm)	16.0	13.9	13.8	12.6	12.5	12.3	14.0	14.3	12.9	15.0	15.7	15.9	168.9
Source 1: Met Office
Source 2: Starlings Roost Weather

== People ==
- Andrew Trew Wood (1826–1903), a Canadian businessman and parliamentarian, was born in Mountnorris.
- David James McEwen was born in Mountnorris in 1863, son of the Presbyterian Minister, Reverend William McEwen. David James McEwen was raised at Rosehill in Mountnorris until 1889, when he emigrated to Australia. By 1895 he owned and operated the Pharmacy in Chiltern, Victoria and in 1900 he and his wife Sarah (née McMillen) had a son, John McEwen, who would become the 18th Prime Minister of Australia.
- Billy Wright (1960–1997), the loyalist paramilitary leader, was raised in Mountnorris. He was a member of the Ulster Volunteer Force (UVF) and founded the breakaway Loyalist Volunteer Force (LVF) in 1996 and was assassinated in 1997 by the Irish National Liberation Army (INLA).

== Education ==
- Mountnorris Primary School
- St. Teresa's Primary School

== See also ==
- List of towns and villages in Northern Ireland
