= Whitecross, County Armagh =

Village in County Armagh, Northern Ireland

Coordinates: 54.22332°N 6.4872°W

Whitecross: Irish: Corr Leacht
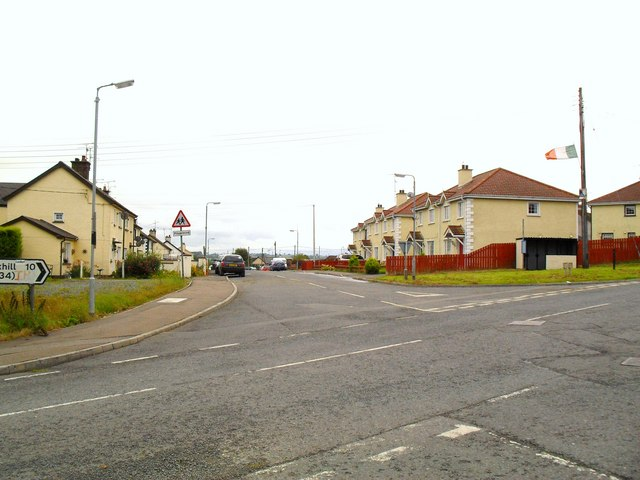
- Houses at Kingsmills Road in Whitecross

- Location within Northern Ireland
- Population: 352 (2011)
- Irish grid reference: H987315
- District: Newry, Mourne and Down
- County: County Armagh
- Country: Northern Ireland
- Sovereign state: United Kingdom
- Post town: ARMAGH
- Postcode district: BT60
- Dialling code: 028
- UK Parliament: Newry & Armagh
- NI Assembly: Newry & Armagh

Whitecross is a small village in County Armagh, Northern Ireland. It lies within the civil parish of Ballymyre and the townland of Corlat (from Irish Corr Leacht, meaning 'round hill of the monument'). In the 2011 census, it had a recorded population of 352.

Whitecross has one public house, which was built in the 1970s on the site of the old police barracks. The original public house stood a few hundred yards away, at the bottom of the Ballymoyer Road. The area's old creamery, once noted for producing fine butter and cheese, was one of the earliest co-operatives in the country.

The townland of Corlat is one of eight townlands given to the Maor family as reward for keeping the Book of Armagh (the name Maor meaning "steward" or "keeper" in Irish). This book is now held at Trinity College, Dublin.

During The Troubles, Whitecross was the site of the shooting dead of three Catholic brothers by the Ulster Volunteer Force on 4 January 1976.
