= Robert John Kerr =

Northern Irish loyalist

- Born: c.1943 Portadown, County Armagh, Northern Ireland
- Died: 8 November 1997 (aged 54) outside Newry, County Down, Northern Ireland
- Cause of death: Vapour explosion
- Other names: "R. J.", Bob
- Known for: Ulster Defence Association (UDA) Mid-Ulster Brigade Portadown battalion commander

Robert John "R. J." Kerr (c. 1943 – 8 November 1997), was a leading Northern Irish loyalist. He served as the commander of the Portadown battalion of the Ulster Defence Association's Mid-Ulster Brigade. Along with the Mid-Ulster Ulster Volunteer Force's brigade commander Robin Jackson, Kerr was implicated in the killing of Catholic chemist William Strathearn. Royal Ulster Constabulary Special Patrol Group officers John Weir and Billy McCaughey named him as one of their accomplice; however, neither Kerr nor Jackson were questioned by police or brought before the court, for "reasons of operational strategy". Weir and McCaughey were convicted of Strathearn's killing.

Kerr was alleged to have been a member of the Glenanne gang, in which Jackson was a key figure. This gang of loyalist extremists was a loose alliance of loyalist paramilitaries and rogue members of the security forces who carried out a series of sectarian attacks in south County Armagh in the 1970s against local Catholics.

Kerr was killed in mysterious circumstances; his charred body was found near a burnt-out boat that had exploded as it was being towed on a trailer on the main Newry to Warrenpoint road.

== Ulster Defence Association ==
Robert John Kerr was born into a Protestant family in Portadown, County Armagh, Northern Ireland in about 1943. He joined the loyalist paramilitary organisation, the Ulster Defence Association (UDA), shortly after its formation in Belfast in September 1971. It was an umbrella organisation of local vigilante groups that were set up following the outbreak of violent religious and political conflict known as the Troubles in the late 1960s, ostensibly for the defence of Protestant communities from nationalist gangs.

At some stage he became the commander of the Portadown battalion of the UDA's Mid-Ulster Brigade. On 9 September 1972 he was charged with possession of weapons and ammunition in suspicious circumstances in Lurgan. Miami Showband bomber Harris Boyle was one of those arrested with him. Kerr was later found guilty of having participated in an armed robbery on 10 March 1973. The following year, on 29 January 1974, he was sentenced to 18 months imprisonment for assaulting and intimidating two men seven months before.

== William Strathearn killing ==
Kerr was named by RUC Special Patrol Group (SPG) officer John Weir as having been one of the two gunmen who shot Catholic chemist William Strathearn to death at his home in Ahoghill, County Antrim on 19 April 1977. Strathearn, who lived above his chemist shop, was shot dead at 2.00 am by a loyalist hit squad. They gunned him down when he opened the front door after the men used a ruse of needing medicine for a sick child. Weir alleged that the actual trigger man was Robin Jackson, brigade commander of the UVF Mid-Ulster Brigade, and Kerr was his accomplice. After the killing, Jackson and Kerr went away in the former's poultry lorry to deliver a load of chickens. Jackson made a living delivering chickens all over Ireland and Kerr worked as his lorry helper, assisting him in loading and unloading the chickens.

Weir and fellow SPG officer Billy McCaughey were later convicted of the killing, although they maintained that they had waited in Weir's car throughout the entire operation. Although Weir and McCaughey named Kerr and Jackson as the gunmen, the two men were never questioned about the attack, and an RUC officer stated that neither Kerr nor Jackson were brought before the court for "reasons of operational strategy". Weir had offered to testify against Kerr and Jackson, but only on the condition that the murder charge against him was withdrawn. Weir's offer was refused by the Assistant Director of Public Prosecutions who said:

Kerr and Jackson have not been interviewed by the police because the police state they are virtually immune to interrogation and the common police consensus is that to arrest and interview either man is a waste of time. Both men are known to police to be very active and notorious UVF murderers. Nevertheless the police do not recommend consideration of withdrawal of charges against Weir. I agree with this view. Weir and McCaughey must be proceeded against. When proceedings against them are terminated the position may be reviewed in respect of Jackson and Kerr. (Note: In Mid-Ulster membership of the UVF and UDA was often interchangeable.[Ref:"Collusion in the South Armagh/Mid Ulster Area in the mid-1970s")

The Derry-based human rights group, the Pat Finucane Centre, asked Professor Douglass Cassel (formerly of the Northwestern University School of Law in Chicago) to convene an international panel of inquiry to investigate collusion by members of the security forces and loyalist paramilitaries in sectarian killings in Northern Ireland. This panel, in their 2006 report, named Kerr as one of the members of the notorious Glenanne gang, of which Robin Jackson was a key figure. The gang was a loose alliance of loyalist extremists who carried out a series of sectarian attacks and killings against Catholics/nationalists in the South Armagh area in the 1970s. The gang comprised loyalist paramilitaries and rogue members of the security forces, including the RUC and Ulster Defence Regiment (UDR). It was allegedly directed by British Military Intelligence and/or the RUC Special Branch. The same report also described Kerr as a local UDA commander.

John Weir stated in his affidavit, which was published in a judiciary inquiry commissioned by Irish Supreme Court Justice Henry Barron into the Dublin and Monaghan Bombings, that he had first met Kerr in the company of Robin Jackson in 1974. Weir had gone to a pub in Moira, County Armagh with a girlfriend and there had been introduced to Kerr and Jackson. Jackson was implicated by Weir as one of the leaders of the two UVF gangs that exploded three car bombs in Dublin's city centre on 17 May 1974, leaving 26 people dead. Kerr was not implicated, however. Weir made his affidavit in 1999 when both Kerr and Jackson were already dead.

The 2003 Barron Report notes that Lord Chief Justice of Northern Ireland Robert Lowry was aware of Kerr and Jackson's involvement in the Strathearn killing, and that they were not prosecuted for "operational reasons". Mr. Justice Barron was highly critical of the RUC's failure to properly investigate Kerr and Jackson.

== Subsequent activity ==
According to Sean McPhilemy, Kerr was one of three loyalist gunmen responsible for the attempted killing of Catholic civilian Paschal Mulholland in Portadown on 11 February 1984. McPhilemy claimed that Kerr and the other gunmen, Philip "Silly" Silcock and Ernest McCreanor, had been drinking with a local Portadown solicitor when they concocted the plan to "kill a Taig". (Note: Taig is a derogatory term for Irish Catholics used by loyalist extremists in Northern Ireland) McPhilemy also stated that Kerr had been part of the hit team responsible for the murder of RUC Sergeant Joseph Campbell in Cushendall on 25 February 1977.

Journalist and author Paul Larkin maintained that Kerr had first coined the nickname "King Rat" for the notorious Billy Wright, leader and founder of the Loyalist Volunteer Force (LVF). It came about as a form of pub bantering. Kerr was sitting inside a pub and jokingly bestowed a nickname upon every patron as they entered. When Wright walked through the door, Kerr dubbed him "King Rat", as Wright and his unit called themselves "The Brat Pack". Sunday World journalist Martin O'Hagan picked up on it and the name was introduced to the media at large, much to Wright's fury.

== Death ==
On 8 November 1997, he was killed in mysterious circumstances. His charred body was found on wasteground 20 yards from a burnt-out boat that had blown up as he was towing it on a trailer. Police and firemen made the discovery after rushing to the scene of the explosion and subsequent fireball which had consumed the craft. This occurred on the main Newry to Warrenpoint road. Kerr was 54 years old at the time of his death, and his body was so badly damaged by the flames that he had to be identified by the documents in his wallet. According to McPhilemy he had made loose arrangements to meet Kerr immediately prior to his death. By that time he had become disillusioned with loyalism.

A post mortem revealed that he had died in a "vapour explosion". Police believe he had been towing the boat on a trailer; when he climbed on the deck, his cigarette ignited the gas, causing a fireball. His death was ruled accidental.

A petrol bomb attack had been carried out the previous August by the LVF against the home Kerr shared in Glandore Terrace, Portadown with his common-law wife, Muriel Richardson. Richardson was hospitalised for smoke inhalation. This attack was followed by a death threat against Kerr. Richardson later testified before a Crown Court jury at Newry that Kerr had lived in fear of the Wright-led LVF after he had accused them of extortion and intimidation. She was a witness for the prosecution at the trial of James Alexander Gribben who was facing charges of conspiring with Kerr to destroy his 36 ft motor cruiser the "Lorna Doon" between 24 March and 8 November 1997 in order to claim compensation from an insurance company. Gribben was found guilty and sentenced to a jail term. LVF leader Billy Wright was shot dead by the Irish National Liberation Army (INLA) in an ambush at the Maze Prison in December 1997 while being transported to the prison's visitors' block.

Kerr was posthumously described by Mike Browne in The People as a former Mid-Ulster UDA brigadier.
