= John Weir (loyalist) =

Ulster loyalist (born 1950)

- Born: John Oliver Weir; 1950 (age 75–76); County Monaghan, Republic of Ireland
- Citizenship: Irish
- Occupations: Sergeant in the Royal Ulster Constabulary (RUC); Officer in the Special Patrol Group (SPG)
- Known for: Ulster Volunteer Force (UVF) and Glenanne gang member

John Oliver Weir (born 1950) is an Ulster loyalist born and raised in the Republic of Ireland. He served as an officer in Northern Ireland's Royal Ulster Constabulary's (RUC) Special Patrol Group (SPG) (a tactical reserve unit), and was a volunteer in the illegal Ulster Volunteer Force (UVF). As a member of the UVF's Mid-Ulster Brigade led by Robin "the Jackal" Jackson, Weir was a part of the Glenanne gang, a group of loyalist extremists that carried out sectarian attacks mainly in the County Armagh area in the mid-1970s.

Weir and his RUC colleague Billy McCaughey were convicted of the 1977 sectarian killing of Catholic chemist William Strathearn and sentenced to life imprisonment. Weir's affidavit which implicated Jackson, other members of the Glenanne gang, soldiers of the Ulster Defence Regiment (UDR), and his colleagues in the RUC and SPG, in a series of sectarian attacks, including the Dublin and Monaghan bombings, was published in the 2003 Barron Report, the findings of an official investigation into the 1974 car bombings commissioned by Irish Supreme Court Justice Henry Barron.

In March 2025, the Belfast Telegraph reported that an ex-RUC sergeant, believed to be John Weir, was to be prosecuted for historical offences including murder and conspiracy to murder as the result of the Operation Newham legacy investigation.

== Early life and the RUC ==
Weir was born in 1950 in the south-west of County Monaghan in the Republic of Ireland to Church of Ireland parents. He was born on a country estate near the County Cavan village of Shercock; his father was employed by the Tenison family as a gamekeeper at Loughbawn House in Shantony townland in County Monaghan. Raised in County Monaghan, he was later educated at The King's Hospital, a Protestant private school in Dublin. Over six feet tall, powerfully built, with blond hair and blue eyes, he had an imposing physical presence, which made him stand out in a crowd.

Initially he had considered joining the Garda Síochána, the police force of the Republic of Ireland; however, in keeping with his family's political traditions, he opted to join Northern Ireland's police force, the Royal Ulster Constabulary (RUC), joining in March 1970 when he was 20 years of age.

Upon his completion of police training in the Training Depot at Queen Street Barracks in Enniskillen in County Fermanagh, he was first posted to the Strandtown RUC Station in loyalist east Belfast. He was transferred to Armagh RUC Station in 1972, and it was there on 1 August 1973 he was recruited into the Special Patrol Group (SPG), which was the RUC's "anti-terrorist" unit. It was made up entirely of Protestants. His duties involved making early morning arrests, evacuation of civilians at the scenes of suspect bombs and responding to explosions and shootings, as well as riot control. He claimed the SPG officers were "very anti-republican, and sectarian attitudes were common". Weir and his colleagues routinely beat up Catholics suspected of harbouring Republican sentiments.

The SPG saw themselves as being the main police line of defence against all terrorist organisations but mainly the atrocities of the outlawed Provisional Irish Republican Army (IRA); who were responsible for more deaths than any other group and as such they considered the republican paramilitaries to be the main threat although they often came under attack from the Ulster loyalist paramilitaries. By the end of 1973, members of the SPG decided that due to the political " softly softly " stance of mainly but not exclusively Labour government policies they would have to "break the rules to curb the terrorists", by which they meant republican paramilitaries. Following the killing of an Ulster Defence Regiment (UDR) officer in 1974 by the IRA, rumours spread that Weir had been involved in the UVF's cross-border killing of prominent IRA man John Francis Green in County Monaghan. Just before Green's killing, Weir had discovered that Green had been using a safe house just over the border and tipped off his RUC Special Branch colleagues. He was therefore sent for his own safety to the SPG unit in Castlereagh, Belfast, on 25 January 1975, fifteen days after Green's shooting.

On 1 September 1976, he was transferred to Omagh where he spent six weeks at Lisanelly Camp. On 11 October 1976 he was promoted to the rank of sergeant and was again transferred, this time to Newry RUC station. He remained in Newry until November 1977, when he was sent to Newtownhamilton RUC station. His next posting was to Dunmurry, Belfast, in April 1978 and his final posting was in Magherafelt, County Londonderry, on 4 September 1978.

== Robin Jackson and the Mid-Ulster UVF ==
Weir stated he first met senior UVF member Robin Jackson in a pub in Moira, County Down, in 1974 where he had gone to have drinks with his girlfriend. Jackson would assume command of the organisation's Mid-Ulster Brigade in July 1975 upon the assassination of the Brigade's founder and first commander, Billy Hanna, who also served as a sergeant in the UDR. Jackson was allegedly the killer. Jackson's brigade was part of a loose alliance of hardline loyalists who carried out a series of sectarian attacks against Catholics/nationalists, mainly in the South Armagh area, but also other areas in Northern Ireland as well as the Republic of Ireland. This group was later named the Glenanne gang. In addition to Jackson's Mid-Ulster Brigade, the gang comprised rogue members of the UDR, the RUC, SPG, and the UDA, allegedly functioning under the direction of British military intelligence and/or RUC Special Branch.

The gang's name derived from a farm in Glenanne, County Armagh, which was owned by RUC reservist, James Mitchell. Weir maintained that it was used as a UVF arms dump and bomb-making site. The bombs which were used in the UVF's 1974 Dublin and Monaghan bombings were built and stored on the farm. Weir claimed Mitchell had admitted to him that he had been involved in the bombings and he had personally seen Mitchell mixing home-made ammonium-nitrate-and-fuel-oil explosive in the farmyard on one occasion.

Weir later admitted to have been indirectly involved in the bombing and shooting attack at the nationalist Tully's Bar in Belleeks on 8 March 1976. According to his later account of events leading up to the attack, when he arrived at Mitchell's farm the designated evening, he saw between eight and ten men dressed in camouflage, parading in the farmyard. Inside the farmhouse he discussed the details of the attack with Mitchell and the others. Mitchell had shown him the floor plans of the pub's interior, highlighting the lack of escape routes for the pub's patrons. The plan was temporarily called off when it was discovered that the British Army's Parachute Regiment was on patrol in the area that evening. Weir returned to Belfast the following morning and that evening, 8 March, Weir heard the attack had gone ahead. There were no casualties, as Mitchell's floor plans were inaccurate. Once the shooting outside had commenced, the pub's customers fled into the living quarters for safety and the bomb only caused structural damage.

Although Weir's later affidavit confirmed he had already indirectly participated in UVF and Glenanne gang operations, and had visited Mitchell's farm, according to journalist Liam Clarke, Weir officially became part of the Glenanne gang on 23 June 1976. He was recruited by SPG colleagues at an RUC sporting event he had attended in East Belfast when he was stationed at Castlereagh RUC station. Weir had been deeply affected by the Kingsmill massacre five months earlier, when 10 Protestant workmen had been ordered out of their minibus and gunned down by a republican group, the South Armagh Republican Action Force (SARAF). It was this attack that had provoked him into becoming a full-fledged member of the group, as Weir and the SPG believed the SARAF was a cover name for the IRA and would carry out more attacks against Protestant civilians.

Weir took his first active role as a UVF paramilitary in the attempted bombing attack against Renaghan's Bar in Clontibret, County Monaghan in the Republic of Ireland on 15 August 1976. The operation was aborted after Weir had driven to Clontibret on the morning of the planned attack to ascertain the roads were clear, only to discover the town had already been sealed off by the Irish Army and Gardaí. When Weir displayed his RUC warrant card to a Garda officer, he was told the Gardaí had received a tip-off from the Northern Ireland security forces that Clontibret was the target of a proposed bombing that evening. Weir returned to the Mitchell farmhouse and found it was under British Army observation. It transpired that the bomb plot had been revealed to the authorities following the earlier arrest of a UVF man from County Tyrone. The next night a UVF unit drove the bomb car, which had been meant for Clontibret, and parked it outside a Catholic owned pub and home in Keady, County Armagh; it exploded, killing a man and a woman. Two weeks later Weir was transferred to Omagh.

Sometime shortly after his promotion to the rank of sergeant and his subsequent transfer to Newry RUC station in October 1976, Weir, Jackson and another RUC officer, Gary Armstrong went on a reconnaissance in South Armagh seeking out the homes of known IRA men, with the intention of assassinating them. Jackson carried a knife and hammer; he boasted to Weir, that if they happened to "find a suitable person to kill, he [Jackson] knew how to do it with those weapons". They drove by the homes of two IRA men, however the plan to kill them was aborted and the three drove back to Lurgan. They were stopped at an RUC roadblock and after an exchange of courtesies were waved through, despite the presence of Jackson with two RUC officers.

While stationed at Newry, Weir visited Jackson's home outside Lurgan, where they discussed potential attacks against the IRA, at least four times. He began to supply the Mid-Ulster UVF with weapons he procured from a loyalist group in County Down called the "Down Orange Welfare" which comprised both former and serving members of the security forces, including Chief Inspector Harry Breen. These weapons were stored at Mitchell's farmhouse. Breen (who later held the rank of Chief Superintendent) and Superintendent Robert Buchanan were both shot dead on 20 March 1989 after being ambushed outside Jonesborough, County Armagh by the Provisional IRA South Armagh Brigade. The two RUC officers were travelling in an unmarked car after attending a cross-border security conference in Dundalk with senior Garda officers.

== William Strathearn killing ==
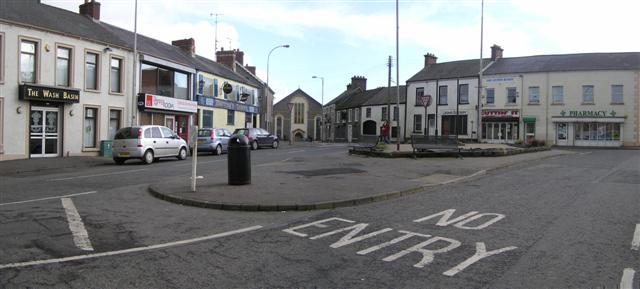
The village of Ahoghill, County Antrim, where the Strathearn killing took place

William Strathearn, a Catholic, was killed at his home at 2:00am on 19 April 1977. Almost three years later, Weir and Constable William "Billy" McCaughey were arrested for their part in the killing and tried before a Diplock court. The story that emerged at the trial was that Weir and McCaughey had decided Strathearn should be killed as they erroneously believed him to be a member of the Provisional IRA. To carry the killing out, they recruited two other loyalists and drove them to Ahoghill where they knocked on the door of Strathearn's home, which was also the village's main shop and chemist, and asked him to open up as they urgently needed medicine for a sick child. When Strathearn opened the door he was immediately shot dead and the four escaped in Weir's RUC car.

It was claimed that the two had been drinking heavily in a pub in Armagh when McCaughey suggested they should carry out a killing as a reprisal for the killings of Constables Hugh McConnell and William Turbitt by the Provisional IRA South Armagh Brigade. Weir was initially reluctant to get involved but was soon convinced and acquired what was described as a "clean Colt. 45" to carry out the shooting with. It was also stated during the trial that the two gunmen had been Robin Jackson and his associate Robert John Kerr, while Weir had maintained he and McCaughey had stayed in the car during the killing.

Weir had been arrested at work in Magherafelt shortly before Christmas 1979 for his part in the murder of Strathearn. He later confessed his involvement at Castlereagh Holding Centre following interrogation. However, during these interviews Weir also reportedly claimed he had arranged the killing because he had been ordered to by his RUC Special Branch superiors. He suggested that the actual gunman Jackson was "untouchable because he was a Special Branch agent". Weir made an offer to testify against Jackson and Kerr but only on condition that the murder charge against him was withdrawn. This offer was refused by the assistant director of Public Prosecutions who said

Kerr and Jackson have not been interviewed by the police because the police state they are virtually immune to interrogation and the common police consensus is that to arrest and interview either man is a waste of time. Both men are known to police to be very active and notorious UVF murderers. Nevertheless the police do not recommend consideration of withdrawal of charges against Weir. I agree with this view. Weir and McCaughey must be proceeded against. When proceedings against them are terminated the position may be reviewed in respect of Jackson and Kerr".

Weir declared: "I think it is important to make it clear that this collusion between loyalist paramilitaries such as Robin Jackson and my RUC colleagues and me was taking place with the full knowledge of my superiors". Two months prior to Weir and McCaughey's arrests, Jackson was arrested for possession of weapons, ammunition, and hoods. The three men were remanded in custody together in Crumlin Road Prison.

Weir pleaded not guilty but was convicted in June 1980 on the basis of admissions he had made during police interrogation. He attempted to repudiate the confessions, alleging that he had been mistreated by the RUC officers in Castlereagh holding cells whilst also claiming that the confinement of his cell made him feel like he was "cracking up". Weir's attempts to have the confessions vacated were unsuccessful. Although sentenced to life imprisonment for the murder of Strathearn, he was released on license on 1 February 1993. The SPG unit was stood down in 1980.

== Weir's affidavit ==
In January 1999, to assist journalist Sean McPhilemy, who was being sued for libel, Weir signed an affidavit containing 62 paragraphs in which he outlined in detail the instances of collusion between his RUC and SPG colleagues, members of the UDR, and loyalist paramilitaries such as Robin Jackson. He implicated them in a series of sectarian killings and bombings carried out by the Glenanne gang. The role of Jackson, who had died in 1998 of cancer, featured largely in Weir's statement. Jackson was named, along with Mid-Ulster UVF brigade commander Billy Hanna (the main organiser) and North Belfast UDA brigadier Davy Payne, as having led one of the UVF teams who attacked Dublin on 17 May 1974 in three separate, no-warning car bombings which left 26 people dead and almost 300 people injured, mostly women.

Weir had received the information regarding the 1974 car bombings and the perpetrators from his associates in the Glenanne gang. Fellow SPG officer and Glenanne gang member Laurence McClure had personally recounted to Weir each sectarian attack carried out by the gang; he also confirmed that the Mid-Ulster UVF unit led by Hanna and Jackson had exploded the car bombs in Dublin's city centre. Stewart Young, a prominent member of the Portadown UVF, told Weir he had headed the team that planted the Monaghan car bomb which had killed an additional seven people 90 minutes after the Dublin blasts. Hanna had also masterminded this attack, although he had allowed Young to lead the bombing unit, while he had gone to Dublin with his own team. Weir stated that UDR intelligence officer Captain John Irwin had supplied the explosives, and James Mitchell's farm had been used for the construction and storage of the bombs. The farm was also utilised for planning other sectarian attacks. Weir learned from both Mitchell and McClure about Hanna's central role in the Dublin and Monaghan bombings, as Weir had never claimed to have personally met Hanna. As Hanna had died in July 1975, it was highly unlikely that he had done so.

Weir identified Jackson as the gunman in many shootings, including those of Strathern, PIRA volunteer John Francis Green, and three members of the O'Dowd family. Shortly before the killing of a Roman Catholic RUC sergeant, Jim Campbell, from County Donegal, in February 1977, Weir was at Jackson's home when he had been invited to accompany Jackson on a mission to kill a Catholic RUC officer which Jackson claimed had been arranged by Billy McCaughey and a Special Branch officer. Weir had turned down the offer, and Campbell was shot dead outside the Cushendall RUC station as he locked up. He also linked Jackson to the 1975 Kay's Tavern bombing in Dundalk. While in prison, Weir wrote a letter to a friend in which he suggested that Jackson had links to British Intelligence Corps and Captain Robert Nairac.

Weir claimed in his statement that shortly before he was sent to Newtownhamilton six months after the Strathearn killing, his association with loyalist paramilitaries became known to senior RUC officers, who encouraged it. They knew of his involvement in Strathearn's shooting death. He was summoned to a meeting with Chief Inspector Brian Fitzsimmons, (Note: Brian Fitzsimmons eventually rose to the rank of Assistant Chief Constable and was one of the senior RUC intelligence men killed in the 1994 Chinook crash at Mull of Kintyre, Scotland.) head of the RUC Special Branch in Newry, who let Weir know he was aware of his UVF activities. Weir claimed "He told me he knew I had connections out there. That was why he wanted me to go out, make more connections, find out what was going on. He made it quite clear that the Special Branch was keeping an eye on me". Although Weir took this to have been an endorsement on the part of Fitzsimmons, journalist Liam Clarke felt it was "partly a warning, and partly a bid for control of his informant". Fitzsimmons placed Weir under surveillance and assigned two Special Branch officers to "befriend him".

After his transfer to Newtownhamilton, Weir felt his life was being placed in danger after Intelligence Corps officers also made contact with him regarding proposed attacks against the IRA. Major Robertson of the Royal Green Jackets suggested he carry out an assassination attempt against Provisional IRA South Armagh Brigade commander Thomas "Slab" Murphy. When Weir informed the two Special Branch men of the plan, he was discouraged from going ahead.

During this period, the Intelligence Corps and RUC Special Branch were involved in an internal power struggle in their mutual battle against the IRA. Weir tried to avoid becoming embroiled in their rivalry but increasingly found himself "pulled in different directions by both sides". Weir told his Special Branch "minders" of his own plan to kidnap IRA man Dessie O'Hare at "The Spinning Wheel" pub which O'Hare frequented in Castleblayney and they both encouraged it; however, when he and Jackson arrived at the pub, they discovered the publican had been warned and they were ordered to leave the premises. The Gardaí phoned the divisional commander in Newry and made a complaint. This was when Special Branch decided to put a stop to Weir's activities and he was moved in April 1978 for his own safety to Dunmurry, a quiet suburb on the outskirts of Belfast with little opportunity for collusion with paramilitaries. He had no further contact with the UVF in Dunmurry nor in Magherafelt. This was his final posting until his arrest without warning in December 1979 for the murder of Strathearn.

Weir's affidavit was published in the 2003 Barron Report, which was the findings of an official investigation into the Dublin and Monaghan bombings commissioned by Irish Supreme Court Justice Henry Barron. The Barron Inquiry interviewed Weir in February 2001; Mr Justice Barron concluded that "Weir's evidence overall is credible".

=== Aftermath ===
Weir's allegations have been the subject of inquiries by both the RUC and Garda Síochána. The RUC's report concluded in part that "as Weir is a convicted murderer his credibility must be in doubt". The RUC made no attempt to interview Weir. The Garda Síochána, who had interviewed him in April 1999, found him to have been "an impressive witness" and they "believed his allegations should be taken seriously".

In 2004, the human rights group, the Pat Finucane Centre, asked Professor Douglass Cassel (formerly of Northwestern University School of Law) to convene an international panel of inquiry to investigate allegations of collusion in Northern Ireland by the security forces and loyalist paramilitaries in a series of sectarian attacks committed in the 1970s against nationalists. This panel found Weir's evidence credible and agreed with the Garda Síochána and the Barron Inquiry that his allegations "must be regarded with the utmost seriousness". The panel published in their 2006 report that RUC ballistics evidence concerning the firearms used in the attacks corroborated Weir's allegations.

In an interview with the RUC on 9 August 2000, James Mitchell staunchly denied Weir's allegations about him, and referred to Weir as a "damned liar and convicted murderer". Alleged Dublin bomber Davy Payne was also questioned about Weir's allegations and he also denied them, as did Stewart Young when asked about his purported role in the Monaghan bombing,

Weir has spoken to and communicated with several journalists including McPhilemy, Liam Clarke, and Joe Tiernan. He was also interviewed by RTÉ in June 1999. In 1994 he moved to Nigeria after he had been warned that his life was in danger from his former colleagues in the security forces and republicans. According to journalist Kevin Dowling of the Sunday Mirror, Weir, who holds an Irish passport, was later deported from Nigeria.

The following statements by Weir appeared in the Irish current affairs magazine Politico in 2006:

I'm lucky to be above the ground. My family has suffered. There is no sense in my saying that I feel sorry for what I have done. But I do believe that it is important that each side looks at the other's point of view. A long-lasting peace will depend on one side showing that they know the other side has also been wronged.

Weir was a major contributor to the 2018 documentary film Unquiet Graves which discussed the Glenanne gang killings.
