= Robert Nairac =

British army officer (1948–1977)

- Nairac in his Grenadier Guards uniform
- Born: Robert Laurence Nairac; 31 August 1948; British Mauritius
- Died: 15 May 1977 (aged 28); Ravensdale, County Louth, Republic of Ireland
- Military career
- Allegiance: United Kingdom
- Branch: British Army
- Service years: 1972–1977
- Rank: Captain
- Unit: Grenadier Guards
- Conflicts: The Troubles; Operation Banner †
- Awards: George Cross

Robert Laurence Nairac GC (31 August 1948 – 15 May 1977) was a British Army captain in the Grenadier Guards. During his fourth tour of duty in Northern Ireland, serving as a military intelligence liaison officer, he was abducted by republicans from a pub in South Armagh while on an undercover operation and subsequently killed by the Provisional Irish Republican Army (IRA). Several men were later convicted of offences related to Nairac's abduction and killing. His body has never been recovered.

In February 1979, Nairac was posthumously awarded the George Cross. A number of sources have alleged that Nairac colluded with loyalist paramilitaries in murders and bombings.

== Early life ==
Robert Laurence Nairac was born on 31 August 1948 in Mauritius, then a British Crown colony, to an English mother and a father of French Mauritian origin. His mother, Barbara (née Dykes) was Anglican, and his father, Maurice, was a Catholic who worked as an eye surgeon. At the age of one, the family relocated to Sunderland, Tyne and Wear, England, where his father worked at Sunderland Eye Infirmary. Nairac was the youngest of four children; he had two sisters and one brother.

He attended preparatory school at Gilling Castle, a feeder school for Ampleforth College, a Catholic public school, which he entered a year later. At Ampleforth he academically excelled, was head of his house, and played rugby football. Nairac became friends with the sons of Lord Killanin and stayed with the family in Dublin and in Spiddal in Connemara, County Galway.

At Lincoln College, Oxford, Nairac read medieval and military history and excelled in sport. He played for the Oxford University Rugby 2nd XV and revived the Oxford University Amateur Boxing Club, with which he won four blues in bouts with Cambridge. He was also a falconer, keeping in his rooms a bird that had been used in the film Kes (1969). He left Oxford in 1971 and entered the Royal Military Academy Sandhurst under the sponsorship of the Grenadier Guards, into which he was commissioned on graduation. After Sandhurst, he undertook postgraduate studies at Trinity College Dublin before joining the regiment.

== Military service in Northern Ireland ==
Nairac's first tour of duty in Northern Ireland was with no.1 company, 2nd battalion, Grenadier Guards. The battalion was stationed in Belfast from 5 July to 31 October 1973. It was given responsibility first for the Protestant Shankill Road and the predominantly Catholic Ardoyne area.

The battalion's main objectives were to search for weapons and to find paramilitaries. Nairac was frequently involved in such activity on the streets of Belfast and was a community relations activist at the Ardoyne sports club. The tour was judged a success, with 58 weapons, 9,000 rounds of ammunition and 693 lbs of explosives recovered, and 104 men jailed. The battalion took no casualties and inflicted none. After the tour ended, Nairac stayed on as liaison officer for the replacement battalion, the 1st battalion, Argyll and Sutherland Highlanders. On their first patrol, Nairac narrowly avoided the impact of a car bomb explosion on the Crumlin Road.

Rather than return to his battalion, which was being transferred to Hong Kong, Nairac volunteered for military intelligence duties in Northern Ireland. After completing several training courses, he returned in 1974, attached to 4 Field Survey Troop, Royal Engineers, one of the three subunits of a special duties unit known as 14 Intelligence Company (14 Int). Posted to South Armagh, 4 Field Survey Troop was tasked with surveillance duties. Nairac was the liaison officer for the unit, the local British Army brigade and the Royal Ulster Constabulary (RUC).

Nairac assumed duties beyond his official role, including undercover operations across the border, to which he paid no attention. He acquired the nickname "Danny Boy" and was, at one stage, spotted in plain clothes at a cattle market in Newry. Former Special Air Service (SAS) man Ken Connor, who was involved in the creation of 14 Int, wrote of him in Ghost Force, p. 263:

Had he been an SAS member, he would not have been allowed to operate in the way he did. Before his death, we had been very concerned at the lack of checks on his activities. No one seemed to know who his boss was, and he appeared to have been allowed to get out of control, deciding himself what tasks he would do.

— Connor

Nairac finished his tour with 14th Int in mid-1975 and returned to his regiment in London, having been promoted to captain on 4 September 1975. Following a rise in violence culminating in the Kingsmill massacre, the British Army increased its presence in Northern Ireland, and Nairac accepted a post as a liaison officer. On his fourth tour, he served as a liaison officer in Bessbrook Mill.

== Death ==
On the evening of 14 May 1977, Nairac left the army base in Bessbrook at 9.25 pm and was due back by 11.30 pm. He drove alone to The Three Steps pub in Dromintee, a village in South Armagh, on an undercover operation potentially to meet an informer. The idea that he was meeting an informer in a pub was discounted by an RUC Special Branch officer, who alleged instead that he had gone to the Three Steps to meet a girl who had a close relative in the IRA. His final communication with base confirmed his arrival at the pub just before 10 pm.

Nairac is said to have told regulars in the pub that he was Danny McErlaine, a motor mechanic and member of the Official Irish Republican Army from Ardoyne. The real McErlaine, on the run since 1974, was ultimately killed by the Provisional Irish Republican Army (IRA) in June 1978 after stealing arms from the organisation. Witnesses say that Nairac got up and sang a republican folk song, "The Broad Black Brimmer", with the band who were playing that night.

Some time after 11 pm, Nairac was walked out of the pub by several men and challenged to a fight by one of them, Terry McCormick, who heard a metallic sound when Nairac was punched and fell to the ground. Believing the man had a gun, McCormick called out to his companions to help overpower him. A party of British soldiers was hidden not more than 100 yards from the pub, but Nairac was unable to contact them through the radio hidden on his person. After a ferocious struggle he was driven across the Irish border to a field in the Ravensdale Woods in the north of County Louth, where an IRA member joined the abduction group. Following a violent interrogation, during which Nairac was allegedly punched, kicked, pistol-whipped, and hit with a wooden post, he was shot dead. He did not admit to his true identity. McCormick, one of the abductors, posed as a priest in order to try to elicit information by way of Nairac's confession. Nairac's last words, according to McCormick, were: "Bless me, Father, for I have sinned."

Nairac's disappearance sparked a large-scale search throughout Ireland. The hunt in Northern Ireland was led by Major H. Jones, Brigade Major at HQ 3rd Infantry Brigade. Nairac and Jones had become friends, and Nairac would sometimes eat supper at the Jones household. After a four-day search, the Garda Síochána confirmed to the RUC that they had reliable evidence of his killing.

The allegation that Nairac's body was disposed of by being put through a meat grinder has been dismissed as a myth. An edition of the BBC's Spotlight, broadcast on 19 June 2007, asserted that the body was not destroyed in a meat grinder, as alleged by an unnamed IRA source. McCormick, who was on the run in the United States for 30 years because of his involvement in the killing, was reportedly told by a senior IRA commander that Nairac was first buried on farmland and then reburied elsewhere. The location of his body remains unknown.

Nairac is one of three IRA victims whose graves have not been revealed and who are among those known as 'The Disappeared'. The cases are under review by the Independent Commission for the Location of Victims' Remains (ICLVR). A former IRA man, identified as Martin McAllister, states that the search for Nairac's body has been hindered by two realities: first, the people involved in his "summary execution" were not in the IRA and, therefore, not subject to pressure from that organisation; second, a number of them have moved to different areas since the killing.

A search for Nairac's body was undertaken at Faughart in the autumn of 2024 but was unsuccessful. In the spring of 2025, an IRA source was quoted as saying that the body would never be located.

In May 2000, allegations were made that Nairac had married and fathered a child with a woman named Nel Lister, also known as Oonagh Flynn or Oonagh Lister. In 2001, Lister's son sought DNA testing, which confirmed the allegations to be untrue.

== Criminal prosecutions ==
In November 1977, Liam Townson, a 24-year-old IRA member from the village of Meigh outside Newry, was convicted of Nairac's murder. Townson, the son of an Englishman who had married a County Meath woman, confessed to killing Nairac and implicated other members of the unit involved. Townson made two admissible confessions to the Gardaí. The first, made around the time of his arrest, started with, "I shot the British captain. He never told us anything. He was a great soldier." The second statement was made at Dundalk Garda station, after Townson had consulted a solicitor. He had become hysterical and distressed and screamed a confession to the officer in charge of the investigation.

Townson was convicted of Nairac's murder in Dublin's Special Criminal Court and sentenced to life imprisonment. He served thirteen years before his 1990 release. In 1998, Townson was part of Conor Murphy's election campaign team.

In 1978, the RUC arrested five men from the South Armagh area. Three – Gerard Fearon (21), Thomas Morgan (18) and Daniel O'Rourke (33) – were charged with Nairac's murder. Michael McCoy (20) was charged with kidnapping and Owen Rocks (22) was accused of withholding information. Fearon and Morgan were convicted. O'Rourke was acquitted but found guilty of manslaughter and jailed for ten years. McCoy was jailed for five years and Rocks for two. Morgan died in a road accident in 1987, a year after his release. O'Rourke became a prominent Sinn Féin member in Drumintee.

Terry McCormick and Pat Maguire, two other men wanted in connection with Nairac's disappearance, remained at large. Maguire has been reported as living in the US state of New Jersey. In September 2021, it was reported that McCormick had died.

On 20 May 2008, 57-year-old IRA veteran Kevin Crilly of Jonesborough, County Armagh, was arrested by officers of the Police Service of Northern Ireland (PSNI). He had been on the run in the US but had returned to Northern Ireland under an alias. Crilly was charged the following day with the kidnapping and false imprisonment of Nairac. In November 2009, during a bail hearing at Newry magistrates' court regarding the two counts on which he had been charged, Crilly was also charged with the murder of Nairac. Crilly was cleared on all counts in April 2011 as the judge considered that the prosecution had failed to prove intention or prior knowledge on his part.

As of 2025, Nairac's killing is one of those under investigation by the PSNI's Historical Enquiries Team (HET).

== George Cross award ==
On 13 February 1979, Nairac was posthumously awarded the George Cross. The citation, as reproduced in The London Gazette, read:

Captain Nairac served for four tours of duty in Northern Ireland totalling twenty-eight months. During the whole of this time he made an outstanding personal contribution: his quick analytical brain, resourcefulness, physical stamina and above all his courage and dedication inspired admiration in everyone who knew him.

On his fourth tour Captain Nairac was a Liaison Officer at Headquarters 3 Infantry Brigade. His task was connected with surveillance operations.

On the night of 14/15 May 1977 Captain Nairac was abducted from a village in South Armagh by at least seven men. Despite his fierce resistance he was overpowered and taken across the border into the nearby Republic of Ireland where he was subjected to a succession of exceptionally savage assaults in an attempt to extract information which would have put other lives and future operations at serious risk. These efforts to break Captain Nairac's will failed entirely. Weakened as he was in strength—though not in spirit—by the brutality, he yet made repeated and spirited attempts to escape, but on each occasion was eventually overpowered by the weight of numbers against him. After several hours in the hands of his captors, Captain Nairac was callously murdered by a gunman of the Provisional Irish Republican Army who had been summoned to the scene. His assassin subsequently said "He never told us anything".

Captain Nairac's exceptional courage and acts of the greatest heroism in circumstances of extreme peril showed devotion to duty and personal courage second to none.

== Collusion allegations ==
=== Miami Showband ===
Des Lee, one of two survivors of the Miami Showband killings of July 1975, accused Nairac of being "responsible from start to finish in the planning of the Miami massacre." Lee stated: "My eyes didn't deceive me. I am an eyewitness to that dreadful night. I know what I saw and more importantly, I know who I saw." The British Army disputes this evidence and states that Nairac was in Scotland at the time.

Lee and Steve Travers, another attack survivor, testified in court that "an Army officer with a crisp English accent oversaw the Miami attack." Travers was uncertain whether or not Nairac was the man overseeing the attack, stating that his distinct impression was that the man had fair hair in contrast to Nairac's dark hair.

In January 2020, Ministry of Defence documents were released indicating that Nairac was linked to the killings, but no proof has emerged of his involvement.

=== Hidden Hand documentary ===
Claims have also been made about Nairac's involvement in the 1974 Dublin and Monaghan bombings, the 1975 assassination of John Francis Green and his relationship with Ulster loyalist paramilitaries. While Nairac possessed paraphernalia related to the Ulster Volunteer Force (UVF), his having any connection to loyalism is denied by IRA man Martin McAllister. Allegations were made concerning Nairac in a 1993 Yorkshire Television documentary, entitled Hidden Hand, about the Dublin and Monaghan bombings. It was stated:

We have evidence from police, military and loyalist sources which confirms the links between Nairac and the Portadown loyalist paramilitaries. And also that in May 1974, he was meeting with these paramilitaries, supplying them with arms and helping them plan acts of terrorism against Republican targets. In particular, the three prime Dublin [bomb attacks] suspects, Robert McConnell, Harris Boyle and the man called 'The Jackal', were run before and after the Dublin bombings by Captain Nairac.

According to the documentary, support for this allegation was said to have come from various sources:

They include officers from RUC Special Branch, CID and Special Patrol Group; officers from the Gardaí Special Branch; and key senior loyalists who were in charge of the County Armagh paramilitaries of the day....

Geoff Knupfer of the ICLVR stated that Nairac was in England at the time of the bombings.

=== Holroyd ===
MI6 operative Fred Holroyd alleged that Nairac had personally admitted involvement in the assassination of IRA member John Francis Green on 10 January 1975. Holroyd alleged in a New Statesman article written by Duncan Campbell that Nairac had boasted about Green's death and showed him a colour Polaroid photograph of Green's body taken immediately after his assassination. The claims were given prominence when, in 1987, Ken Livingstone, in his maiden speech as an MP, told the House of Commons that Nairac was quite likely to have been the person who organised the Miami Showband massacre and that the same gun that was used by Nairac on his cross-border trip to assassinate Green was used in the Miami Showband massacre. Livingstone stated:

There is something rotten at the heart of the British security services, and we will not have a safe democracy until it is exposed in its entirety and dealt with.

The Barron Report stated:

The evidence before the Inquiry that the polaroid photograph allegedly taken by the killers after the murder was actually taken by a Garda officer on the following morning seriously undermines the evidence that Nairac himself had been involved in the shooting.

Holroyd's evidence was also questioned by Barron:

The picture derived from this is of a man increasingly frustrated with the failure of the British Authorities to take his claims seriously; who saw the threat to reveal a crossborder SAS assassination.

Geoff Knupfer of the ICLVR states that Nairac was 80 mi (130 km) away in Derry at the time of Green's assassination.

=== Barron Report ===
Nairac was mentioned in Mr Justice Henry Barron's inquiry into the Dublin and Monaghan bombings when it examined the claims made by the Hidden Hand documentary, Holroyd and Colin Wallace. Former RUC Special Patrol Group member John Weir, who was also a UVF member, claimed he had received information from an informant that Nairac was involved in the killing of Green:

The men who did that shooting were Robert McConnell, Robin Jackson and I would be almost certain, Harris Boyle who was killed in the Miami attack. What I am absolutely certain of is that Robert McConnell, Robert McConnell knew that area really, really well. Robin Jackson was with him. I was later told that Nairac was with them. I was told by… a UVF man, he was very close to Jackson and operated with him. Jackson told [him] that Nairac was with them.

Martin Dillon, in his book The Dirty War, maintained that Nairac was not involved in either attack. Geoff Knupfer of the ICLVR states Nairac was in either London or Scotland at this time.

Wallace, in describing Nairac as a liaison officer, said: "His duties did not involve agent handling." According to Wallace, Nairac "seems to have had close links with the Mid-Ulster UVF, including Robin Jackson and Harris Boyle ... [H]e could not have carried out this open association without official approval, because otherwise he would have been transferred immediately from Northern Ireland." Jackson was implicated in the Dublin and Monaghan bombings of May 1974, and Boyle was blown up by his own bomb during the Miami Showband massacre.

The Barron Inquiry found a chain of ballistic history linking weapons and killings under the control of a group of UVF and security force members, including RUC Special Patrol Group members John Weir and Billy McCaughey, that is connected to those alleged to have carried out the bombings. This group, known as the "Glenanne gang," included, among others, "three murders at Donnelly's bar in Silverbridge, the murders of two men at a fake Ulster Defence Regiment checkpoint, the murder of IRA man John Francis Green in the Republic, the murders of members of the Miami showband and the murder of Dorothy Trainor in Portadown in 1976, they included the murders of three members of the Reavey family, and the attack on the Rock Bar in Tassagh". According to Weir, members of the gang began to suspect that Nairac was playing republican and loyalist paramilitaries off against each other by feeding them information about murders carried out by the "other side" with the intention of "provoking revenge attacks."

== Portrayals ==
Eoin McNamee's 2004 novel The Ultras contains a fictionalised account of Nairac's life. McNamee said that he had had "the idea of Nairac in my head for a long time, but I wasn't able to find a way into the whole subject. In the end, I used him as a conduit to the covert and psychic infrastructure of the time, to the gripping physical and moral texture of what was going on".

=== 2025 documentary ===
In 2025, BBC Northern Ireland broadcast The Disappearance of Captain Nairac, a documentary examining his undercover activities, abduction, and the continuing search for his remains.

== See also ==
- Murder of Jean McConville
- British Military Intelligence Systems in Northern Ireland
- The Troubles in Forkhill
- Special Reconnaissance Unit
- List of kidnappings
- List of solved missing person cases: 1950–1999
- Internal Security Unit
