= John Francis Green =

Irish Republican

- John Francis Green
- Born: 18 December 1946; Lurgan, County Armagh, Northern Ireland
- Died: 10 January 1975 (aged 28); Mullyash, Castleblayney, County Monaghan, Republic of Ireland
- Military career
- Allegiance: Provisional Irish Republican Army
- Service years: 1969–1975
- Rank: Staff Captain and Intelligence Officer
- Unit: North Armagh Brigade
- Conflict: The Troubles

John Francis Green (18 December 1946– 10 January 1975) was a leading member of the North Armagh Brigade of the Provisional Irish Republican Army. He was killed in a farmhouse outside Castleblayney, County Monaghan, by members of the Mid-Ulster Brigade of the Ulster Volunteer Force (UVF). According to Fred Holroyd, Special Reconnaissance Unit officer Robert Nairac was involved in Green's killing. Green's was one of the 87 killings attributed by the Pat Finucane Centre to the group of Ulster loyalist paramilitaries, Ulster Defence Regiment soldiers and Royal Ulster Constabulary officers known as the Glenanne gang. No one was ever prosecuted for the killing.

== Provisional IRA ==
Green was born in Lurgan, County Armagh, Northern Ireland and grew up in a Roman Catholic family. He was an active member of the civil rights group People's Democracy, and later joined the Provisional Irish Republican Army. Green went on the run following the introduction of internment in August 1971, but was arrested and interned on the Maidstone prison ship. Green was afterwards transferred to Long Kesh internment camp. On 9 September 1973, Green escaped from Long Kesh disguised as a priest. During a visit with his brother, Gerard Green, a Catholic priest, the two men exchanged clothing, and Green made his escape undetected by the guards. Gerard was later discovered tied up in one of the prison's compounds.

== Killing ==
Following his escape, Green lived in the Monaghan and Castleblayney areas. An Irish government agent, Sean O'Callaghan, states he met Green at an IRA training camp in County Kerry at the end of 1973. During the IRA Christmas ceasefire in 1974, Green returned home to Lurgan to visit his family. While he was there a British Army patrol arrived at his house and carried out a routine check-up, the Green family being prominent republicans. On the evening of 10 January 1975, he drove to a farmhouse in Mullyash, outside Castleblayney. When the farmer, an elderly republican sympathiser, went to tend a neighbour's cow, Ulster loyalist gunmen from the UVF Mid-Ulster Brigade kicked down the front door and shot Green six times in the head at close range, killing him instantly. To the Ulster Volunteer Force in mid-Ulster, Green was a high-profile target. According to journalist Peter Taylor, the killers left behind some bullets in the shape of the letters UVF. The UVF claimed responsibility for the killing in the June 1975 edition of its magazine Combat. Green's killing occurred during an IRA ceasefire, which had been declared the previous month.

=== Allegations ===
It was claimed by Royal Ulster Constabulary (RUC) Special Patrol Group (SPG) officer John Weir, that the UVF killers were Robin Jackson (who was also allegedly involved in the 1974 Dublin car bombings as well as a series of sectarian killings), Robert McConnell, and Harris Boyle. The men, including Weir, were all members of the Glenanne gang, which was made up of rogue elements of the RUC, Ulster Defence Regiment, and the UVF Mid-Ulster Brigade. These allegations were published in the 2003 Barron Report, which was the findings of an official investigation of the bombings by Irish Supreme Court Justice Henry Barron. In the same report, Weir claimed that he had received information from an informer that Special Reconnaissance Unit officer Robert Nairac was also involved in Green's killing. The 1993 Yorkshire Television documentary The Hidden Hand: The Forgotten Massacre states that Robin Jackson and his UVF comrades were controlled by Nairac, who was attached to 14th Intelligence Company. Royal Corps of Transport officer Fred Holroyd claimed that Nairac had personally killed Green, who was, according to Holroyd, commander of the Provisional Battalion of North Armagh. Holroyd also claimed that Nairac boasted about the killing and had shown him a colour polaroid photograph of Green's corpse taken after the killing. Holroyd also told the Garda Síochána that he had received a photograph of Green some months prior to his killing. Holroyd enlarged the photograph and had it distributed. He believed from that time until Green's death, 4 Field Survey Troop, one of the three sub-units of the 14th Intelligence Company led by Captains Nairac and Tony Ball, had Green placed under surveillance. Holroyd's claim has been discounted by two Garda investigations which revealed that the polaroid was one of a series taken of Green's body by a Garda officer the morning following his fatal shooting.

Years after the death of John Francis Green, journalist Peter Taylor conducted an interview with his brother, Leo, who had been a key figure in the 1980 hunger strike at the Maze Prison. When asked about John Francis' killers, Leo told Taylor he believed they had been "loyalists or British Army or a combination of both". Green went on to add that the UVF's motives for killing his brother may not have been solely on account that John Francis was a prominent IRA member.

I would suggest that it would have annoyed the loyalists that there was a [IRA] truce with the British Government and there may well have been fear that some sort of negotiated settlement was going on behind their backs. Probably my brother's killing would have been designed to anger and provoke the IRA into breaking the truce.

== Aftermath ==
A post-mortem revealed that Green had been shot six times in the head at close range, the bullets all having entered from the front. At the time of his death, Green was married and the father of three children.

After his killing, the Gardaí found Green's car, a Volkswagen Beetle, parked beside the house. They discovered weapons, ammunition and documents hidden behind the backseat. In the glove compartment were 26 photographs of members of the Provisional and Official IRA, all of whom were wanted by the security forces in Northern Ireland. A further search inside the house and the grounds disclosed more ammunition and bomb-making materials.

Green's killing was one of 87 which the Pat Finucane Centre has linked to the Glenanne gang, a group comprising rogue elements of the RUC, UDR working alongside the UVF which carried out a series of sectarian attacks in the Mid-Ulster/South Armagh area in the 1970s.

According to the Barron Report (2003), a Luger pistol used in Green's killing was linked six months later to the Miami Showband killings, which left three band members dead. Both Robin Jackson and Robert Nairac were allegedly behind that attack, while Harris Boyle was blown up after the bomb he and Wesley Somerville (another UVF and Glenanne gang member) had placed in the band's minibus had gone off prematurely. Martin Dillon, in his book The Dirty War, claims that Nairac was not involved in Green's killing, nor the Miami Showband attack. In his 2015 biography of Nairac, retired diplomat Alistair Kerr produced evidence that clears Nairac of involvement in both the Green killing and Miami Showband ambush.

Captain Robert Nairac was abducted and killed in 1977 by the IRA. On 7 April 1977, the South Armagh Republican Action Force claimed responsibility for shooting dead Protestant man Hugh Clarke at Tullymacreeve near Forkill, County Armagh. The book Lost Lives says that the IRA shot Clarke. It adds: "the IRA claimed Hugh Clarke was involved in the killing of IRA member John Francis Green. On the night of the Green killing, he had been at the house where the IRA man's body was found".

On 9 January 2005, in Castleblayney, over 800 people participated in a march and unveiling of a memorial at Keady Cross to commemorate the 30th anniversary of the killing of Green.

== See also ==
- Robert Nairac
- Glenanne gang
- Robin Jackson
