= Fred Holroyd =

British Army officer

Captain Frederick John Holroyd is a former British soldier who was based at the British Army's 3 Brigade HQ in mid-Ulster, Northern Ireland during the 1970s. He enlisted as a gunner in the Royal Artillery, and three years later, in 1964, he was commissioned into the Royal Army Service Corps (later the Royal Corps of Transport). He volunteered for the Special Military Intelligence Unit in Northern Ireland in 1969, and he was trained at the School of Service Intelligence. Once his training was finished, he was stationed in Portadown, where, for two and a half years up to 1975, he ran a series of intelligence operations. He resigned from the Army in 1976.

== Collusion allegations ==
Holroyd has made several claims of collusion between the Intelligence Corps and Ulster loyalist paramilitaries during the Troubles in Northern Ireland. Holroyd was one of a number of former security force members who either exposed or admitted to such activity, the most prominent being Colin Wallace and John Weir.

Holroyd also claimed that during the mid-1970s the Special Air Service (SAS) used the cover name, "4 Field Survey Troop, Royal Engineers" during operations. This modus operandi was introduced in 1973 and abandoned in 1975. Fred Holroyd claimed this was an SAS unit working undercover at the Royal Engineers' base at Castledillon, County Armagh. Holroyd said he worked with the members of this unit and that members were told that it was a NITAT (Northern Ireland Training and Tactics Team), whose personnel were "former, serving or recently trained" Holroyd claimed that the unit was made up of SAS soldiers, with the commanders being infantry officers attached to the SAS. One of these was Captain Robert Nairac, described as, "seconded to 14th Intelligence", otherwise known as 14 Intelligence Company" or '14 Int'.

He also added to allegations that a cabal of right-wing British intelligence operatives from MI5 and the SIS, along with figures from the British establishment, had been involved in a plot to destabilise and overthrow the Prime Minister Harold Wilson through a secret organization known as "Group 13". The former intelligence officer Peter Wright, author of Spycatcher, was said to have been part of this group. Holroyd's allegations surfaced again in a New Statesman article written by Duncan Campbell in 1984. Holroyd's allegations helped form the basis for the 1990 Ken Loach film, Hidden Agenda.

== Involvement with Ken Livingstone ==
Labour Member of Parliament in the UK, Ken Livingstone, formerly Head of the Greater London Council, latterly Mayor of London, took up the case of Fred Holroyd, and used his maiden speech as MP to highlight Holroyd's allegations.

During my election campaign in Brent, East, there was an unusual public meeting. An individual was invited to it who has never been a Socialist, who will never be prepared to vote Labour and who thinks that the Tory party is the natural governing party of Britain.

He was invited to share a platform with myself and some of the relatives of those who have been subjected to miscarriages of justice by the British courts over issues of bombing here in Britain. We invited Mr Fred Holroyd. For those who do not know, Mr Holroyd served in Northern Ireland with distinction. As I said, he is no Socialist. He comes from a military family. He went to a Yorkshire grammar school. His whole objective in life was to serve in the British Army. He believed in it totally. He enlisted as a private in the gunners, and 3 years later he was commissioned into the Royal Corps of Transport. He volunteered for the Special Military Intelligence unit in Northern Ireland when the present troubles began, and he was trained at the Joint Services School of Intelligence. Once his training was finished, he was stationed in Portadown, where, for two and a half years, he ran a series of intelligence operations.

When he was recruited as an MI6 officer, he said of them that they were not disagreeable; their ethics were reasonable; they were seeking a political solution. His complaint, which eventually led to his removal from the Army and an attempt to discredit him, which has been largely successful, was made when the MI6 operation was taken over by MI5 in 1975 – by many of the same people who are dealt with in Peter Wright's book (Spycatcher), and many of the same people who are alleged to have been practicing treason against the elected Labour Government of the time. He said that once the MI5 took over the reasonable ethics of MI6 were pushed aside by operatives in the intelligence world who supported the views of Mr Kitson and the policies and tactics of subverting the subverters. I recommend Brigadier Kitson's words to those who are not aware of them. His attitude was to create a counter-terror group, to have agents provocateur, to infiltrate and to run a dirty tricks campaign in an attempt to discredit the IRA.

Mr Holroyd continued to believe that what he was doing was in the best interests of the British state until early in 1975, when Captain Robert Nairac, who, as many hon. Members will know, was later murdered by the IRA, went into his office, fresh from a cross-border operation – something that of course is completely illegal – and showed him the colour photographs that had been taken by Captain Nairac's team. Captain Nairac had crossed the border with some volunteers from the UVF. He had assassinated John Francis Green, an active member of the IRA who was living south of the border. As an agent of the British Government operating across the border as an assassin he had brought back photographs as proof of that operation.

When Captain Nairac showed the photographs, Mr Holroyd started to object, not because he objected to an active member of IRA being assassinated in a highly illegal cross-border raid, but because he realised that once the British state started to perpetrate such methods there was no way that eventually Britain would not alienate vast sections of the community and eventually lose the struggle for the hearts and minds of the Irish people.

Holroyd then started to object to the use of such illegal methods by MI5 officers. He was immediately shuffled to one side by the expedient method of being taken to a mental hospital and being declared basically unfit for duty. During the month he spend in the British mental hospital, the three tests that were administered to him were completely successfully passed.

...What is particularly disturbing is that what looked at the time like a random act of maniacal violence and sectarian killing now begins to take on a much more sinister stance. It begins to emerge that Captain Robert Nairac is quite likely the person who organised the killing of the three Miami showband musicians. The evidence for that allegation is forensic and members of the UVF are prepared to say that they were members of the UVF gang who actually undertook the murder of the Miami showband musicians. The evidence is quite clear. The same gun that was used by Captain Nairac on his cross-border trip to assassinate John Francis Green was used in the Miami showband massacre.

Livingstone also asked a series of questions in the parliament session about Holroyd's treatment following his allegations of collusion between the Intelligence Corps and loyalist paramilitaries.

== Life after the military ==
Following the surfacing of these allegations Holroyd claims to have been forcibly retired from MI6 and placed in Netley Hospital, a military mental health institution. Holroyd has campaigned since then to have the Ministry of Defence admit that he was wrongly institutionalised.

Holroyd wrote the book War without Honour with Nick Burbridge. It was published in 1989.

== Barron report into the Dublin and Monaghan bombings ==
Holroyd gave evidence to Justice Henry Barron during his inquiry into the Dublin and Monaghan bombings of 17 May 1974. Holroyd stated that "the bombings were part of a pattern of collusion between elements of the security forces in Northern Ireland and loyalist paramilitaries."

Barron was asked about a seeming contradiction in Holroyd's input to the report during public hearings:

Since that time Captain Holroyd has persistently accused the British army of having engaged in serious unlawful acts, including murder and kidnapping, of encouraging assisting Loyalist paramilitaries in the commission of such acts, of recruiting agents from the ranks of the security forces of this State and of acts of gross incompetence which resulted in loss of life". For that reason, his [Holroyd's] claims justify careful scrutiny. At the same time it must be acknowledged that Holroyd is, in some ways, a compromise source".

When asked at a public hearing what he meant by "compromise source", Barron replied:

There are many reports on him suggesting that he is a Walter Mitty type. That is probably the easiest way of explaining it... We said his detail was totally unreliable but the substance related to events which took place.

In his official statement to the Oireachtas joint Committee, Barron stated:

A number of Holroyd's allegations are not completely true, but they relate to events that did happen. Insofar as they raise serious questions concerning the behaviour of the security forces, North and South during the 1970s, they are of relevance to the work of this Inquiry, and have contributed to the Inquiry's view on the possibility of collusion between elements of the security forces in Northern Ireland and loyalist paramilitaries.

Barron also stated in his Report,

It must be said that when interviewed by the Inquiry [Holroyd] made no effort to avoid any questions asked of him; nor did he appear to be withholding information. He gave his answers openly, fairly and with conviction. He is aware that he has been misquoted and misinterpreted on occasion and has sought to correct any misapprehensions where they have arisen. He has also shown a willingness to take on board evidence and information which seem to contradict his claims, though for the most part he has maintained the truth of his allegations and of their provenance.

In his report Barron found that members of the Garda Síochána (Republic of Ireland police force) and of the Royal Ulster Constabulary (RUC) attempted to unfairly and unjustly undermine the evidence and character of Holroyd. For instance

Holroyd was also proven correct in his allegation that a Garda officer arranged a meeting in Dublin between an Irish Army EOD officer and his British counterpart. The denial of the Garda officer concerned that he requested Holroyd organise the meeting should be read in the light of his attempts to deny knowing or meeting Holroyd at all, which are not convincing.

Barron also noted,

Some of the RUC officers interviewed by the Inquiry, in their apparent eagerness to deny Holroyd any credibility whatsoever, themselves made inaccurate and misleading statements which have unfortunately tarnished their own credibility.

Then Assistant Commissioner of the Garda, Edmund Garvey denied that he had met Holroyd at Garda headquarters in 1975. Holroyd named Garvey, and another Garda (codename: "the badger"), as being on the "British side". Justice Barron found: "The visit by Holroyd to Garda Headquarters unquestionably did take place, notwithstanding former Commissioner Garvey's inability to recall it". Barron further noted:

On the Northern side, there is conflicting evidence as to how, why and by whom the visit was arranged. Regrettably, Garda investigations have failed to uncover any documentary evidence of the visit, or to identify any of the officers involved in arranging it from the Southern side.

On 19 January 1978, then Commissioner Edmund Garvey was dismissed without explanation by the incoming Fianna Fáil government, which stated that it no longer had "confidence" in him as Garda Commissioner.
