= Commission of Investigation: Dublin and Monaghan Bombings 1974 =

After publication of Justice Henry Barron's report on the Dublin and Monaghan bombings, the Irish Government established a follow-on Commission of Investigation: Dublin and Monaghan Bombings 1974 to inquire into certain aspects of the Gardaí investigation into the 1974 bombings on 13 May 2005 under Patrick MacEntee SC QC as sole member.

== Terms of reference ==
The terms of reference of the Commission of Investigation are:

To undertake a thorough investigation and make a report on the following specific matters considered by the Government to be of significant public concern.

- Why the Garda investigation into the Dublin and Monaghan bombings was wound down in 1974?
- Why the Gardaí did not follow up on the following leads:
  - information that a white van, with an English registration plate, was parked outside the Department of Posts and Telegraphs in Portland Row and was later seen parked in the deep sea area of the B & I ferry port in Dublin, and the subsequent contact made with a British Army officer on a ferry boat leaving that port;
  - information relating to a man who stayed in the Four Courts Hotel, Dublin between 15 and 17 May 1974 and his contacts with the UVF;
  - information concerning a British Army corporal allegedly sighted in Dublin at the time of the bombings.
- In relation to the missing documentation:
  - the exact documentation (Departmental, Garda intelligence and any other documentation of relevance) that is unaccounted for;
  - the reasons explaining why the documentation went missing;
  - whether the missing documentation can now be located.
  - whether the systems currently in place are adequate to prevent a re-occurrence of such documentation going missing.
- To take account of investigative work already undertaken into the Dublin and Monaghan bombings of 1974, including the Report of the Independent Commission of Inquiry, the Final Report of the Joint Committee on Justice, Equality, Defence and Women's Rights, Inquest Statements and the Internal Garda Investigation.
- To provide a final report to the Taoiseach not later than six months from the date of establishment of the Commission.

== Interim reports ==
- First Interim Report of Commission of Investigation into Dublin and Monaghan Bombings 1974 (November 2005)
- Second Interim Report of Commission of Investigation into Dublin and Monaghan Bombings 1974 (January 2006)
- Third Interim Report of Commission of Investigation into Dublin and Monaghan Bombings 1974 (February 2006)
- Fourth Interim Report of Commission of Investigation into Dublin and Monaghan Bombings 1974 (May 2006)
- "Interim Report on the Report of the Independent Commission of Inquiry into the Dublin and Monaghan Bombings of 1974 – 19th April 2006". Archived from the original on 19 February 2012.
- Fifth Interim Report of Commission of Investigation into Dublin and Monaghan Bombings 1974 (July 2006)
- Commission of Investigation Into The Dublin and Monaghan Bombings of 1974 – Sixth Interim Report, October 2006
- Commission of Investigation into The Dublin and Monaghan bombings of 1974 – Seventh Interim Report
- Commission of Investigation into The Dublin and Monaghan bombings of 1974 – Final Report March 2007

== Oireachtas reports on Dublin and Monaghan Bombings ==
- The Report of the Independent Commission of Inquiry into the Dublin and Monaghan Bombings – by Justice Henry Barron
- Final Report on the Independent Commission of Inquiry into the Dublin and Monaghan Bombings – by Oireachtas Joint Committee
- The Report of the Independent Commission into the Dublin Bombings of 1972 and 1973 – by Justice Henry Barron
- Final Report on the Independent Commission of Inquiry into the Dublin Bombings of 1972 and 1973 – by Oireachtas Joint Committee

== Publication ==
The McEntee report was published at 5pm on 4 April 2007, after its contents had been given to surviving victims and to the families of those who had been killed by the bombs.

- Commission of Investigation into The Dublin and Monaghan bombings of 1974 – Final Report March 2007. (April 2007)

The Commission Report stated that Garda intelligence failed "to meet an adequate and proper standard" and "The commission considers that it is probable that this serious organisational deficit provided an inadequate standard of support to those Gardaí involved in the criminal investigations." Photograph albums of suspects were missing, including records of the contents. Garda notebooks were "presumed lost, abandoned or destroyed." A finger print was found on a registration plate of the Monaghan bomb car. McEntee observed, "This registration plate is no longer in the possession of the Garda Síochána."

The Report further stated that it had been hampered by inadequate information provided by the British authorities and by loss of an unknown amount of information in the possession of the Gardaí. McEntee considers that his investigation, like the Barron Inquiry, was limited "by not having access to original security and intelligence documents in the possession of the British Government." The Report said its terms of reference were not wide-ranging enough to allow it to comment further.

No definitive finding was possible on why the Garda investigations ended in July (Monaghan) and August (Dublin) 1974, due to loss of material, deaths of witnesses, and a practice of "not committing decisions to writing".

Relatives of those killed said they were disappointed but not surprised by findings.

== See also ==
- List of notable Public Inquiries in Ireland
