= The Troubles in Forkhill =

Incidents in Forkhill, Northern Ireland during the Troubles

The Troubles in Forkhill recounts incidents during, and the effects of, the Troubles in Forkhill (or Forkill), County Armagh, Northern Ireland.

Incidents in Forkhill during the Troubles:

== 1974 ==
- 10 March 1974 - Michael McCreesh (15) and Michael Gallagher (18), both Catholic civilians, were killed by a Provisional Irish Republican Army (IRA) booby trap bomb hidden in an abandoned car and intended for a British Army foot patrol, Dromintee, near Forkhill. Gallagher died on 14 March 1974.
- 14 December 1974 - David McNeice (19), a Protestant member of the Royal Ulster Constabulary, and Michael Gibson (20), a member of the British Army, were shot dead by IRA snipers while on joint foot patrol, Killeavy, near Forkhill. Gibson died on 30 December 1974.

== 1975 ==
- 17 July 1975 - Peter Willis (37), Edward Garside (34), Robert McCarter (33) and Calvert Brown (25), all members of the British Army, were killed near Forkhill by a Provisional Irish Republican Army remote-controlled bomb, hidden in a milk churn and detonated when their search patrol passed. On 10 July, British soldiers had seen an apparent suspect explosive device near Forkhill and kept it under observation until 17 July, when a patrol went to deal with it. On approach, an explosive was detonated from a distance. RIC (photographic aerial reconnaissance) had been flown that morning but ground mist obscured the remote wire. As well as the four soldiers killed, another was seriously wounded. A man was arrested and appeared in court charged with murder.

== 1977 ==
- 14 May 1977 - Robert Nairac (29), undercover British Army officer, was abducted by the Provisional Irish Republican Army outside the Three Step Inn, Dromintee, near Forkhill and presumed killed. Several men have been imprisoned for his murder.

== 1980 ==
- 1 January 1980 - Simon Bates (23) and Gerald Hardy (18), both British soldiers, were shot dead in error, by other British soldiers while setting up an ambush position near Forkhill.

== 1984 ==
- 31 January 1984 - William Savage (27) and Thomas Bingham (29), both Protestant members of the Royal Ulster Constabulary, were killed in a Provisional Irish Republican Army land mine attack on their armoured patrol car, the attack took place in Drumintee.

== 1993 ==
- 17 March 1993 - Lawrence Dickson (26), a member of the British Army, was shot and killed by an IRA sniper while on foot patrol along Bog Road, Forkhill
