= Billy McCaughey =

Northern Ireland loyalist paramilitary (c. 1950–2006)

- McCaughey, c. 2003
- Born: William McCaughey c. 1950; Ahoghill, County Antrim, Northern Ireland
- Died: 8 February 2006 (aged 55–56); Ballymena, County Antrim
- Military career
- Allegiance: Royal Ulster Constabulary; Ulster Volunteer Force
- Nickname: "The Protestant Boy"
- Units: RUC Special Patrol Group; UVF Mid-Ulster Brigade
- Conflict: The Troubles

William McCaughey (c. 1950 – 8 February 2006) was a member of the Royal Ulster Constabulary's Special Patrol Group and the illegal Ulster Volunteer Force's Glennane gang in the 1970s. He was imprisoned for 16 years for murder from 1980 to 1996. On his release he worked as a loyalist and Orange Order activist until his death in 2006.

== Early life ==
Growing up a Presbyterian in a townland outside Ahoghill, County Antrim, McCaughey was given the nickname "The Protestant Boy" which he carried into adulthood. His father, Alexander McCaughey, was an elder in the local Trinity Presbyterian Church. He was described by investigative journalist Martin Dillon as a "pillar of respectability". McCaughey served in the Ulster Special Constabulary (USC), better known as 'the B Specials', and when that was disbanded, he joined the regular Royal Ulster Constabulary (RUC). A former bodyguard to Ulster Unionist minister John Taylor, McCaughey was also a member for a time of the Ulster Protestant Volunteers, a paramilitary group associated with the Reverend Ian Paisley, and of Paisley's Free Presbyterian Church.

== Special Patrol Group ==
In the early 1970s, McCaughey was assigned to the RUC Special Patrol Group (SPG), a specialist "anti-terrorist" unit, based in Armagh. McCaughey co-operated extensively with the UVF Mid-Ulster Brigade and carried out a number of attacks on their behalf, along with SPG colleagues. He "expressed virulently anti-Catholic views ... and made it known ... that he had strong links to the UVF. A Special Branch recommendation that he be excluded after his probationary period was overridden by an inspector's report that described him as 'one of the best, if not the best, constables attached to my section (of the B Specials)'".

McCaughey said of his RUC SPG unit: "Our colour code was Orange and it was Orange by nature and several of us were paramilitaries. Our proud boast was that we would never have a Catholic in it. We did actually have a Catholic once, a guy called Danny from Dungannon. The day after he joined we had him dangling out from the back of a Land Rover with his chin inches from the road. He lasted a week". In 1977 he was charged with stealing a table from the home of Cllr. Elsie Kelsey, the then Mayor of Lisburn. McCaughey had been on escort duty for Ulster Unionist Party (UUP) politician John Taylor, who was attending a party in the house at the time.

== Conviction for murder ==
McCaughey was arrested in 1980 along with SPG colleague John Weir, and admitted to a number of sectarian murders. However, the two were convicted of just three crimes, murder, kidnapping and attempted murder. McCaughey served 16 years. He admitted the 1977 sectarian murder of chemist William Strathern, a Catholic. In 1977, the leader of the UVF Mid-Ulster Brigade, Robin Jackson, was named in court as the gunman who shot Strathern in Ahoghill, County Antrim, for which McCaughey and John Weir were convicted. Jackson was not questioned, for "operational reasons" which have never been detailed.

McCaughey also pleaded guilty to the kidnapping of a Catholic priest, Father Hugh Murphy, in retaliation for the kidnapping and killing of two members of the security forces by the Provisional Irish Republican Army (IRA). Fr. Murphy was released unharmed after a plea from Ian Paisley. He also admitted to a gun and bomb attack on a pub, The Rock Bar, in Keady in 1977. McCaughey shot and seriously injured a man who prevented him entering the pub, which he intended to spray with machine gun fire. The bomb failed to explode. Two other RUC officers were handed suspended sentences for their part in the bombing. The guns used in the attack were the same ones used in the murder of three Catholic brothers, Anthony, John and Brian Reavey, in Armagh on 4 January 1976. McCaughey was also implicated in the killings of three members of the O'Dowd family - Barry, his brother Declan and their uncle Joe - targeted 10 minutes after the Reaveys (see Reavey and O'Dowd killings). McCaughey told the surviving Reavey brother in 1988 that he was at the house with three other attackers but fired no shots.

McCaughey claimed that the Kingsmill massacre of 10 Protestant civilians the following day caused him to pass RUC intelligence to loyalist paramilitaries. He was one of the first police officers on the scene and recalled that

When we arrived it was utter carnage, Men were lying two or three together. Blood was flowing, mixed with water from the rain... When I got home, I noticed the bottom of my trousers, big heavy police trousers, were soaked. I squeezed them out on the kitchen floor and I think there was as much blood as water. I had a lot of bad experiences but that was the worst, certainly in terms of human suffering.

== Further allegations ==
Weir and McCaughey implicated colleagues in at least eleven other sectarian murders. McCaughey alleged that many local RUC and Ulster Defence Regiment (UDR) personnel were working with loyalist paramilitaries in the Armagh area in what became known as the Glenanne gang. The Barron Enquiry into the Dublin and Monaghan bombings of 1974 found a chain of ballistic history linking weapons and killings, to which McCaughey admitted involvement. These included, "in 1975, three murders at Donnelly's bar in Silverbridge, the murders of two men at a fake UDR checkpoint, the murder of IRA man John Francis Green in the Republic, the murders of members of the Miami showband and the murder of Dorothy Trainor in Portadown. In 1976, they included the murders of three members of the Reavey family, and the attack on the Rock Bar in Tassagh."

In addition

Barron found that it was probable the guns were kept at a farm at Glenanne belonging to James Mitchell, an RUC reservist ... from which a group of paramilitaries and members of the security forces ... carried out the massacres at Dublin and Monaghan.... The chain was unbroken because the perpetrators of these attacks weren't caught, or investigations were haphazard, or charges were dropped, or light or suspended sentences were given. The same individuals turn up again and again, but the links weren't noted. Some of the perpetrators weren't prosecuted despite evidence against them.

Weir alleged that McCaughey was part of this "Glenanne gang", although McCaughey disputed this. McCaughey refused to give evidence to Mr Justice Barron's enquiry, claiming "I know nothing about it". Mr Justice Barron disagreed. "The Inquiry agrees with the view of An Garda Siochana that Weir's allegations regarding the Dublin and Monaghan bombings must be treated with the utmost seriousness."

== Prison and subsequent activities ==
In prison in the Maze, McCaughey completed a degree in Education and Social Science in 1994 from the Open University. He also claimed that he was "a devout member of Ian Paisley's Free Presbyterian Church." McCaughey had had a long association with Paisley, founder and leader of the Free Presbyterian Church, and of the Democratic Unionist Party (DUP), which McCaughey had originally joined in the 1960s.

He organised fundraising in prison to help defend DUP deputy leader Peter Robinson in a court case, organising a sponsored run around the prison exercise yard. Ian Paisley wrote a letter of thanks to McCaughey in 1991, promising to try to help try to get his sentence shortened. Paisley wrote in his own handwriting: "'There is a door for you to get to the Secretary of State, a door which we were able to open'". The letter was made public by Paisley's opponents in the run-up to the referendum on the Good Friday Agreement in 1998.

McCaughey was released in 1996. He appears to have become disillusioned with Paisley, allowing his membership of the Free Presbyterian Church to lapse by 1998. After his release he was approached by people in Ballymena who told him "Great job – pity you got caught", which he disagreed with. He declared himself "undecided" in the Good Friday referendum of that year: "I want to support this agreement. I want it to work, but don't want to be endorsing some republican plot." McCaughey became a member of the Progressive Unionist Party (PUP), the party associated with the UVF. He also started work as a self-employed builder.

He became a prominent figure in the weekly picketing of Our Lady's Roman Catholic Church in Harryville, Ballymena, which was organised in protest against the re-routing of Orange Order marches. However, he denied he was the central organiser. He admitted, "I have done a few press releases" and that he had taken part in the church pickets "maybe six times" over a 21-week period.". McCaughey said he sympathised with the aim of the Harryville protest, which was "to secure civil rights" for Orangemen in Dunloy. He later claimed that he had 'withdrawn from the protest because of a "witch hunt" against him by the nationalist media'. He was pictured wearing his Orange Order sash during one occasion at the protest. The Ulster Unionist Party MP Ken Maginnis had called for McCaughey to be returned to jail for his role in the Harryville protest.

Some years later McCaughey joined the short lived United Loyalist Cultural Committee, a loyalist group which admitted to having members from the UVF and UDA. In 2001, the Committee threatened to hold regular weekly street protests in a Roman Catholic part of Ballymena until Irish tricolours were removed. The protest was followed by a loyalist attack to remove the flags in Fisherwick estate, Ballymena. Over twenty men were charged with breaching the peace in the incident. McCaughey organised a picket with 20 supporters on the day of the court hearing. He explained: "This is not a protest - we are here to show our sympathy for the boys."

In 2002, relatives of McCaughey's victim William Strathearn were upset to discover that McCaughey was entitled to his RUC pension for his previous years service in the RUC. When he was sent to prison the then RUC chief constable, Jack Hermon, opposed any pension for McCaughey but failed on a legal technicality. McCaughey himself justified the pension stating: "I've earned it. I did 10 years service fair and square, and I can say that I'm not the only one with a past that has got the pension from the RUC."

Along with fellow PUP members in Ballymena in 2003, McCaughey took part in a campaign to stop racist attacks in the town. Immigrant workers from Romania and the Philippines residing in loyalist areas had their homes attacked, leading McCaughey to encourage young loyalists in the town not to join racist groups.

In April 2004, McCaughey attended an official dinner with Her Excellency Mary McAleese, the President of Ireland, at Áras an Uachtaráin, the Presidential residence in Dublin. McCaughey declared that he intended "to invite the President to visit the staunchly Protestant Ballee and Harryville areas of Ballymena". McCaughey then withdrew the invitation because of President McAleese's "Holocaust Day speech in which she compared Protestant prejudice towards Catholics to the Nazi hatred of Jews".

In July 2005, a meeting of the District Policing Partnership in the County Antrim village of Clogh had to be abandoned after loyalist protesters, including McCaughey, protested due to the presence of SDLP councillor and DPP chairman Declan O'Loan. Protesters shouted sectarian abuse at O'Loan and McCaughey stated the protest could have been avoided if O'Loan "had accepted his total unacceptability" in Clogh.

In August 2005, McCaughey warned that loyalists were considering restarting the picket outside Harryville Roman Catholic Church in Ballymena if Orange Order marchers were rerouted from a mainly Roman Catholic area of the town.

When republicans proposed their first ever parade in Ballymena in 2005 to commemorate Operation Demetrius, to some surprise McCaughey didn't have any objections to the proposed parade as long as the route wasn't contentious.

In 2001, McCaughey stood for election to Ballymena Borough Council, for the PUP in Ballymena South (51 votes, 0.48% - one of two PUP candidates, PUP total: 94 votes, 1.4%) and 2005 (94 votes, 1.6% - sole PUP candidate). He also unsuccessfully contested North Antrim for the assembly elections in 2003 (230 votes, 0.5%). His inability to gain election was often mocked by his political rivals.

== Personal life ==
McCaughey was married and had three children with his wife Angela. After McCaughey's arrest in 1978, his wife divorced him. In 1980, after the Cullybackey branch of the Apprentice Boys unfurled a banner presented to them by McCaughey, his former wife voiced her opposition and announced her intention to change her name and those of her children by deed poll.

In 2001, his son Kenneth stood for election to Ballymena Borough Council as a PUP candidate. He was unsuccessful, receiving 53 votes (0.5% of the total votes cast).

Despite his convictions, McCaughey was a member of an Orange Lodge in Ballymena, previously a member of a Lurgan lodge and the Royal Black Preceptory. However, he was expelled from the latter.

== Death ==
McCaughey died of lung cancer on 8 February 2006. He was believed to have contracted cancer over a year previously and was thought to be in remission after treatment. The local Ballymena Times reported, "McCaughey apparently underwent a 'Road To Damascus' style conversion - supporting the peace process and leading a campaign against Neo Nazis". A tribute was also reported from a leading Irish Trade Unionist Peter Bunting. Bunting's father was once held at gun point by McCaughey in 1971 due to the fact he was a Catholic and was forced to leave his job. Bunting stated "Billy McCaughey was prepared to kill for what he saw as his people. At the end of his days, he had lived for more people than he could have ever dreamed about in 1971. I would also like to think that, if my father had lived long enough to witness the full life of Billy McCaughey, then he too would have recognised him as a brother and a comrade." David Ervine described him as having an "immense effect on people's attitudes." He was buried in his native Ahoghill.
