= Special Reconnaissance Unit =

British Army intelligence unit

- Active: 1972–2005
- Country: United Kingdom
- Branch: British Army
- Type: Military Intelligence
- Role: Clandestine operation Close-quarters combat Counterinsurgency; Covert operation HUMINT; Special operations Special reconnaissance Urban warfare
- Part of: United Kingdom Special Forces
- Headquarters: RAF Aldergrove, Northern Ireland
- Engagements: Operation Banner (The Troubles)

The Special Reconnaissance Unit, also known as the 14 Field Security and Intelligence Company, was a unit of the British Army's Intelligence Corps which conducted covert operations in Northern Ireland during the Troubles. It conducted undercover surveillance operations against suspected members of Irish republican and Ulster loyalist paramilitary groups. Members of the unit were recruited from regular Army battalions and trained in an eight-week course by the Special Air Service (SAS). The unit, then numbering 120 men, was deployed to Northern Ireland in November 1972. Their responsibilities included intelligence gathering and assessment and tracking down and neutralising suspected paramilitaries. Allegations of collusion with loyalist paramilitaries were made against the unit. In 1987, the unit became part of the newly formed United Kingdom Special Forces directorate, and formed the core of the new Special Reconnaissance Regiment in 2005.

== Predecessor ==
The Special Reconnaissance Unit, also known as 14 Intelligence Company, was the successor to the Military Reaction Force (MRF). Selection to 14 Intelligence Company was available to all serving members of the British armed forces and to both sexes. For the first time, women could become members of a UK Special Forces unit. Candidates were required to pass a rigorous selection process, designed to select only those individuals possessing the highly specialized qualifications needed to deal with the stresses of undercover covert operations. In one selection course, out of 1000 applicants, only 17 were ultimately deployed to Northern Ireland.

== Wilson briefing ==
"Special Reconnaissance Unit" is the term appearing in official documents from the 1970s. An April 1974 briefing for Prime Minister Harold Wilson states:

The term "Special Reconnaissance Unit" and the details of its organisation and mode of operations have been kept secret. The SRU operates in Northern Ireland at present under the cover name "Northern Ireland Training and Advisory Teams (Northern Ireland)" – NITAT(NI) – ostensibly the equivalent of genuine NITAT teams in UKLF and BAOR.

== Structure ==
Authors claiming to be former members of the unit describe an organisation with a depot in Great Britain and four operational detachments in Northern Ireland.

- Main Det (Headquarters), RAF Aldergrove
- East Det, based at Palace Barracks, Belfast
- North Det, based at Ballykelly, County Londonderry
- South Det based in Fermanagh

Selection and training of personnel from all arms of the British Armed Forces was conducted in a number of locations in Great Britain. Candidates, both male and female, volunteered for special duties for periods of 18–36 months, before being returned to a parent unit. Trained surveillance operators could volunteer for re-deployment after a period with the parent unit, with potential opportunities to serve in command, staff or training roles within the organisation or higher command structure.

== Weapons issued ==
While the unit was active, there was a wide variety of firearms utilized by the unit.

- Browning Hi Power 9×19mm pistol
- Walther P5 9×19mm pistol
- Walther PPK .22 Long Rifle (preferred as backup weapon or primary for female operatives)
- Heckler & Koch MP5K 9×19mm sub-machine gun
- Heckler & Koch HK33 – HK53 variant used as carbine and chambered in 5.56×45mm
- Heckler & Koch G3KA4 7.62×51mm

== Collusion accusations ==
14 Intelligence was accused of acting in collusion with loyalist paramilitaries by former intelligence personnel Fred Holroyd and Colin Wallace in regards to the death of senior Provisional Irish Republican Army member John Francis Green, the Miami Showband killings and the Dublin and Monaghan bombings.

== Casualties ==
- 14 April 1974: Captain Anthony Pollen was shot dead by the IRA in Derry while carrying out undercover surveillance on a demonstration in the Bogside area.
- 14 December 1977: Corporal Paul Harman was shot dead by the IRA in west Belfast. Harman was undercover when he stopped his red Morris Marina on Monagh Avenue. An IRA unit approached the car and shot him in the head and back and burned the car.
- 11 August 1978: Lance Corporal Alan Swift was shot dead while undercover in the Bogside area of Derry City. Two IRA members fired into the corporal's car with automatic rifles.
- 6 May 1979: Sergeant Robert Maughan was shot dead outside a church in Lisnaskea
- 21 February 1984: Sergeant Paul Oram was killed in an incident in mainly nationalist Dunloy, Ballymoney when he and a colleague were surprised during the night by an IRA unit operating in the area. Oram and his colleague drew their pistols and engaged the men, striking Declan Martin (18) and Henry Hogan (21). Oram was killed almost instantly. According to his colleague, the two IRA members fell to the ground and were still alive, but he killed them as, in his opinion, they still constituted a threat. Oram's colleague was seriously wounded but team members stationed nearby assisted, and he survived.
- 19 March 1988: Corporals Derek Wood and David Howes were killed when they drove into an IRA funeral in Belfast. It is alleged by former British soldier Seán Hartnett that the corporals were members of the Royal Corps of Signals attached to the Joint Communications Unit (JCU).

== See also ==
- Force Research Unit
- United Kingdom Special Forces
