= Ahoghill =

Town in County Antrim, Northern Ireland

Coordinates: 54.851°N 6.366°W

Ahoghill: Irish: Achadh Eochaille; Scots: Ahauchill
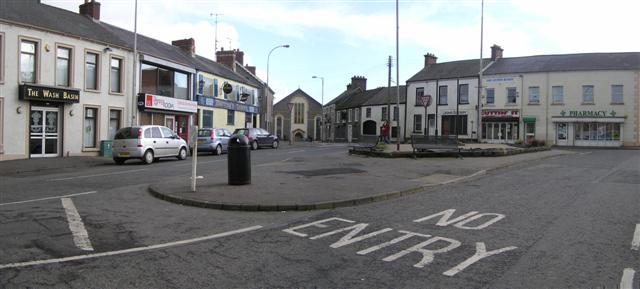
- Main Street

- Location within Northern Ireland
- Population: 3,521 (2021 census)
- County: County Antrim
- Country: Northern Ireland
- Sovereign state: United Kingdom
- Post town: BALLYMENA
- Postcode district: BT42
- Dialling code: 028
- Police: Northern Ireland
- Fire: Northern Ireland
- Ambulance: Northern Ireland
- UK Parliament: North Antrim
- NI Assembly: North Antrim

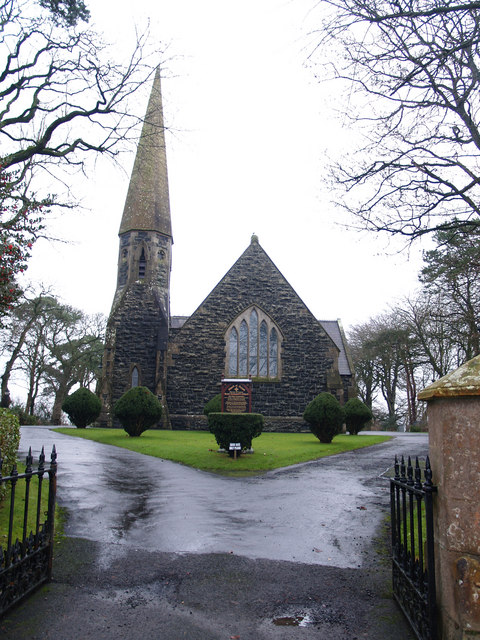
St Colmanell's Church of Ireland

Ahoghill (/əˈhɒhɪl/ or /əˈhɒxɪl/; from Irish Achadh Eochaille 'field of the yew forest') is a small town and civil parish in County Antrim, Northern Ireland, four miles from Ballymena. It is located in the Mid and East Antrim Borough Council area. It had a population of 3,521 people at the 2021 census.

In early documents, Ahoghill is referred to as Magherahoghill meaning "the plain of the yew forest."

== Demography ==
Ahoghill had a population of 3,521 people at the 2021 census, an increase of 3.7% on the 2011 census population of 3,403. At the 2021 census:

- 24.3% were aged under 20 and 12.0% were aged 70 and over
- 48% of the population were male and 52% were female
- 3.4% were from a Catholic background and 81.0% were from a Protestant or other Christian background

== History ==
=== Religious revival ===
The 1859 Revival which swept through Ulster has strong connections with Ahoghill. Thousands of ordinary folk had their lives changed at this time. Especially notable is the reports of men and women weeping in the streets of Ahoghill. On Monday 14 March 1859 a thanksgiving service took place in the new First Ahoghill Presbyterian Meetinghouse at which some of the converts from Connor spoke. It was estimated that 3,000 people attended and the commotion was such that the minister ordered the building to be emptied out of fear of the crowded gallery giving way. The crowd spent upwards of three hours in the rain continuing in prayer and praise. The gallery of First Ahoghill still bears the effects of this event; it is visibly sunken to one side.

Today Ahoghill has three Presbyterian churches, First Ahoghill on Straid Road, Brookside on Brook Street and Trinity on Church Street. There is also St Colmanell's Church of Ireland on Church Street, a Gospel Hall on Glenhugh Road and a Roman Catholic Chapel on Ballynafie road.

=== The Troubles ===
On 19 April 1977 William Strathearn (39), a Catholic shop owner was shot and killed by the Ulster Volunteer Force (UVF) while at his home in Ahoghill. The murder was carried out by Billy McCaughey who was a UVF member despite also being a former police officer.

The village has seen frequent sectarian attacks, particularly in 2005 when several Catholic families left after attacks on their homes, and is considered a staunchly loyalist area.

== Sport ==
Ahoghill Thistle F.C. and Ahoghill Rovers F.C. are two local association football teams. The local Gaelic Athletic Association (GAA) clubs include St. Mary's GAC and Clooney Gaels GAC.

== Notable people ==
•Colby Gordon - local football player

== See also ==
- List of towns and villages in Northern Ireland
- List of civil parishes of County Antrim
