= Pat Finucane Centre =

- Type: Non-profit, interest group
- Location(s): Derry and Newry, Northern Ireland
- Services: Research and documentation of conflict related-deaths during the Northern Irish conflict, advocacy and lobbying
- Key people: Geraldine Finucane
- Website: http://www.patfinucanecentre.org/

The Pat Finucane Centre (PFC) is a human rights advocacy and lobbying entity in Northern Ireland. Named in honour of murdered solicitor Pat Finucane, it operates advice centres in Derry and Newry, dealing mainly with complaints from Irish nationalists and republicans. The PFC promotes a nonviolent ethos, believing that the Northern Irish conflict arose mainly due to the government's failure to uphold Article 7 of the Universal Declaration of Human Rights:

all are equal before the law and are entitled without any discrimination to equal protection of the law

— Article 7, Universal Declaration of Human Rights

The PFC also states that the criminal justice system is not conducive to justice regarding crimes during the Northern Irish conflict, and, following a relative's request, one of the core activities of the PFC is to research and document individual cases of death during the conflict.
