= Henry Barron (judge) =

Irish High, later Supreme, Court judge

Judge of the Supreme Court
- In office 1 June 1997 – 21 May 2000
- Nominated by: Government of Ireland
- Appointed by: Mary Robinson

Judge of the High Court
- In office 20 December 1982 – 30 May 1997
- Nominated by: Government of Ireland
- Appointed by: Patrick Hillery

Personal details
- Born: 25 May 1928 Dalkey, Dublin, Ireland
- Died: 25 February 2010 (aged 81) Merrion Road, Dublin, Ireland
- Spouse: Rosalind Barron (m. 1956; died 1997)
- Children: 4
- Education: Trinity College Dublin

Henry Barron (25 May 1928 – 25 February 2010) was an Irish judge who served as a Judge of the Supreme Court from 1997 to 2000 and a Judge of the High Court from 1982 to 1997.

He was known for granting Ireland's first divorce in 1997, and for his investigation into the 1974 Dublin and Monaghan bombings. His report on the bombings became known as the Barron Report, and it made a contribution towards the 2005 Commission of Investigation: Dublin and Monaghan Bombings 1974.

He was president of the Irish Jewish Museum. His wife, Rosalind, was the granddaughter of the chess player Philip Baker.

== Career ==
Barron attended Castle Park School in Dalkey, Dublin, before progressing to Saint Columba's College, Rathfarnham. He studied at third level in Trinity College Dublin, leaving in 1950, he scored first class honours and was awarded a moderatorship in legal science. In 1951, he began the Bar and silk followed nineteen years later.

In 1982, he was nominated by the government of Taoiseach Garret FitzGerald to become a judge of the High Court. He served on the High Court for fifteen years. In 1997, Taoiseach John Bruton and the 24th Government of Ireland nominated Judge Barron as a judge of the Supreme Court. Upon his appointment to the court, he granted the state's first divorce. He was the first Jew ever appointed to the Irish Supreme Court.

== Retirement and Barron Report ==
Judge Barron retired in 2000. He was then commissioned to investigate the 1974 Dublin and Monaghan bombings and Judge Liam Hamilton replaced him in the Supreme Court. He retired from the bench due to ill health. He investigated bombing incidents in Castleblayney, Dundalk, Dublin Airport, the Miami Showband murders and the deaths of eighteen other individuals. His report, termed The Barron Report and presented to the Oireachtas Joint Committee on Justice in December 2003, was highly critical of the investigation into the bombings by both the Fine Gael-Labour government and the Gardaí, and stated they might have made a better attempt to catch those responsible. He did not lay any definitive blame on the British Government.

== Death ==
Barron died at the age of 81 in St. Vincent's University Hospital, Dublin, on 25 February 2010, having been unwell for a short time. His wife Rosalind had predeceased him by 13 years. 2 sons (Harrie & Robert), 2 daughters (Jane & Anne) and 10 grandchildren outlived him. Barron's funeral took place at Dolphins Barn Jewish Cemetery on 26 February 2010.

After his death tributes were made by politicians and campaigners for justice:

As the sole member of the Commission of Inquiry into the Dublin and Monaghan bombings of 1974 and into a number of other bombings and atrocities which occurred in this State during the 1970s, he undertook his task with great sensitivity and thoroughness. Tribute from Taoiseach Brian Cowen

As a member of the Oireachtas Committee which subsequently held hearings based on the investigation carried out by Mr Justice Barron, I came to fully appreciate extent the scope of the work he had undertaken and the demands placed on his. He showed great commitment in the search for the truth about these events and in his dealing with the families he displayed exceptional understanding and sensitivity. It was as a result of the refusal of the British authorities to cooperate in full with the investigation, rather than any failings on the part of Henry Barron, that those responsible have still not been brought to justice. Tribute from Joe Costello (Labour)

He wasn't afraid to name names, he wasn't afraid to criticise the Irish and British Governments, and he wasn't afraid of the security forces north or south of the border. The British security forces, the state and the Cosgrave coalition all came for heavy criticisms from Judge Barron. It gave families some sort of closure. Tribute from Margaret Urwin (Justice for the Forgotten)
