= Special Patrol Group (RUC) =

Irish reserve unit

Royal Ulster Constabulary
- Abbreviation: RUC

Agency overview
- Formed: 1 June 1922
- Preceding agency: Royal Irish Constabulary
- Dissolved: 4 November 2001
- Superseding agency: Police Service of Northern Ireland

Jurisdictional structure
- National agency: Northern Ireland, UK
- Operations jurisdiction: Northern Ireland, UK
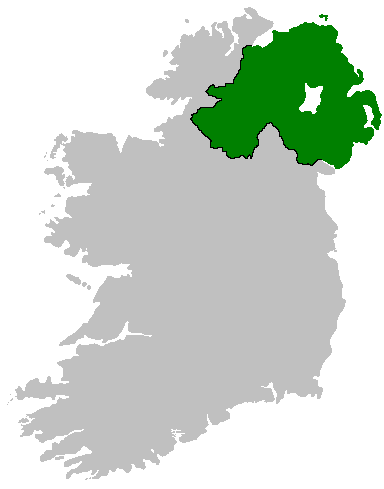
- Map of Royal Ulster Constabulary's jurisdiction
- Area: 13,843 km^{2} (5,345 sq mi)
- General nature: Local civilian police

The Special Patrol Group (SPG) of the Royal Ulster Constabulary was a tactical reserve of 310 officers which had the role: "to provide support to divisional policing, both uniform and CID, to police interface areas at times of civil unrest, and to do so in a disciplined way. The Special Patrol Group was preceded by the Reserve Force; the name was changed to Special Patrol Group in 1970 to mirror the introduction of the Metropolitan Special Patrol Group and to avoid confusion between the Reserve Force and the newly formed RUC Reserve.

== Organisation ==
Each SPG section had 31 members, and was assigned a number and a colour - No.2 Section, based at Tennent Street, off the Shankill Road, Belfast, for example, was designated 'White section'. The Special Patrol Group were the first officers trained in special weapons and tactics, and in the use of personal protective equipment for use in public order which was being developed since the start of civil unrest in Northern Ireland in 1969. They were given upgraded weaponry and dispersed in units across the region. The uniformed sections carried out 24 hour anti-terrorist patrols in fibreglass-reinforced 'Makrolon' Land-Rovers, prior to the introduction of armour-plated Land-Rovers. The 'Makrolons' patrolled with open back doors, so that SPG officers could debus rapidly. In addition to Walther PP pistols (later replaced with .357 Magnum Ruger Speed-Six revolvers, which were reckoned to have more 'stopping power' than the standard Walther) and batons, each constable carried either a Sterling submachine gun, a Ruger Mini-14 carbine, or a 7.62 mm L1A1 SLR rifle. A few officers were issued with Lee-Enfield sniper-rifles with telescopic sights, converted to use 7.62 mm ammunition. The six-man teams were trained in special weapons and tactics (SWAT) techniques.

== History ==
The RUC SPG was based on the Metropolitan Police model with the main roles of preventing outbreaks of public order and an anti-terrorist role. The SPG in London was disbanded in January 1987 and the same fate befell the RUC Special Patrol Group. They were replaced by Divisional Mobile Support Units operating under local divisional control.

=== Bronze section ===
Within the SPG another unit was formed and given the name "Bronze section". Apparently modelled on the Mobile Reaction Force created by Brigadier (later general) Frank Kitson. While the formation of Bronze section led directly to the creation of "E" Department within Special Branch the best known of which is the E4A department which dealt with humint and E4B which specialised in intelligence led operations etc. Following the return of primacy to the police the Special Support Unit (SSU) which was trained by the SAS was formed to perform an anti terrorist role like its army counterpart before it, it did not enjoy any notable success at first however, their activity and infiltration of the provisional IRA undermined their operations to such an extent that it would eventually lead to a ceasefire.

== Arrests ==
Two SPG members, John Weir and Billy McCaughey were arrested in 1979 and confessed to paramilitary activities. In June 1980, they were convicted of the murder of Catholic chemist William Strathearn in April 1977.

Weir accused his colleagues of participation in 11 killings. An independent inquiry in 2006 found that in 7 out of 8 cases, ballistics tests corroborated his claims, linking the killings to weapons carried by RUC officers. The Barron report found that a group of loyalist paramilitaries, RUC officers, and British military personnel operating out of a farm in Glenanne was responsible for up to 31 killings. This group become known as the Glenanne gang.

The SPG was temporarily restricted from patrolling republican areas such as Crossmaglen and Silverbridge. However, some of the restrictions were lifted after Weir and another RUC officer met Harold McCusker, the local Unionist MP and asked for them to be lifted. According to Toby Harnden, "the years when McCaughey and the RUC Special Patrol Group were at large represented the only period when loyalist paramilitaries made forays deep into South Armagh, a republican stronghold".

The Armagh SPG was stood down and the remainder of the Special Patrol Group was renamed as the Divisional Mobile Support Unit (DMSU) which had already existed as to supplement the numbers in the SPG.

== Casualties ==
The first SPG casualty was Const Robert Buckley from Portadown, married with two young daughters. Killed 26 February 1971 when gunmen opened fire from the cover of a rioting mob at Alliance Avenue, Belfast An SPG constable, Noel Davies, was the first policeman killed by the INLA as he made to drive away a recovered stolen vehicle.

== Bibliography ==
- Asher, Michael. Shoot to Kill - A Soldier's Journey Through Violence. Penguin 1990. Cassell 2003. ISBN 0-304-36628-5
- Doherty, Richard. The Thin Green Line The History of the Royal Ulster Constabulary GC, Pen & Sword, 2004, ISBN 1-84415-058-5
- Ellison, Graham; Smyth, Jim. The Crowned Harp: Policing Northern Ireland. Pluto Press, London, 2000, ISBN 978-0-7453-1393-1.
- Harnden, Toby. Bandit Country:The IRA and South Armagh . Hodder Paperbacks; New Ed edition, 6 July 2000, ISBN 0340717378
- David R Orr. RUC Spearhead: The RUC Reserve Force 1950-1970 Redcoat Publishing. 2013, ISBN 978-0-9538367-4-1.
