= 1972 and 1973 Dublin bombings =

Terrorist attacks in Dublin, Ireland

- Part of the Troubles
- Location: Dublin, Republic of Ireland
- Date: 26 November 1972 (1:25); 1 December 1972 (19:58; 20:16); 20 January 1973 (15:18)
- Attack type: 1 bomb and 3 car bombs
- Deaths: 3
- Injuries: 185

Between 26 November 1972 and 20 January 1973, there were four paramilitary bombings in the centre of Dublin, Ireland. Three civilians were killed and 185 people were injured. No group ever claimed responsibility for the attacks and nobody was ever charged in connection with the bombings. The first bombing in Burgh Quay may have been carried out by former associates of the Littlejohn brothers who were Secret Intelligence Service provocateurs, in a successful attempt to provoke an Irish government clampdown against the Provisional IRA, while the other three bombings were possibly perpetrated by loyalist paramilitaries, specifically the Ulster Volunteer Force (UVF), with British military or intelligence assistance. The UVF claimed in 1993 to have carried out the 1974 Dublin and Monaghan bombings which incurred the greatest loss of life in a single day throughout the 30-year conflict known as the Troubles.

On 1 December 1972, when two separate car bombs exploded in Eden Quay and Sackville Place, Dáil Éireann was debating a bill to amend the Offences Against the State Act which would enact stricter measures against the Provisional IRA and other paramilitary groups. As a result of the two bombings, which killed two men and wounded 131, the Dáil voted for the amendment, which introduced special emergency powers to combat the IRA. It is believed that the 26 November and 1 December bombings were executed to influence the outcome of the voting. Irish Supreme Court Justice Henry Barron commissioned an official inquiry into the bombings. The findings were published in a report in November 2004.

== Background ==
The bombings in Dublin occurred at the end of what was the bloodiest year in the entire 30-year-old religious-political conflict known as the Troubles, which had erupted at the end of the 1960s. Following the Bloody Sunday incident in Derry on 30 January 1972 when the British Army's Parachute Regiment shot dead 14 unarmed Catholic civilians during an anti-internment demonstration, a torrent of anti-British sentiment was unleashed in Ireland and beyond. An angry crowd in Dublin attacked the British embassy and burnt it to the ground. The Official IRA responded with the 1972 Aldershot Bombing in England, at the headquarters of the Parachute Regiment. This attack killed seven civilians. In retaliation for the shootings in Derry, the Provisional IRA escalated its armed campaign with a series of bombings across Northern Ireland which led to a high number of civilian casualties.

Much of these bombs that detonated in Northern Ireland and the ingredients used to make them (mostly stolen from Irish construction sites provided to the IRA by local sympathisers) originated from the Republic of Ireland, where the IRA Southern Command (headquartered in Dublin) was located and tasked in recruiting and training volunteers and manufacturing weapons for operations in the North and to provide shelter for fleeing IRA members from British security forces who were not permitted to enter the country (see Provisional IRA in the Republic of Ireland). In December 1971, Stratton Mills, MP for Belfast North, said that "there is virtually a gelignite trail across the [Irish] border", comparing it with the famous Ho Chi Minh trail during the Vietnam War. Mills stated that:

[S]ome 60 percent of the gelignite used in Northern Ireland has come from Southern Ireland, and the security authorities believe that the figure might well be higher than that because of the difficulty of definite identification in all cases. In Northern Ireland steps are taken to control the use and distribution of gelignite. Certain steps have been taken recently in the South, but there is a great need for much tighter measures.

Four days after the Donegall Street bombing in central Belfast on 20 March which killed seven people, British Prime Minister Edward Heath announced the suspension of the 50-year-old Stormont parliament and the imposition of Direct Rule from London. This caused Ulster loyalists and unionists throughout Northern Ireland to feel profoundly angry, shocked, and betrayed; moreover, they considered it to have been another "sign of continuing Government weakness in the face of IRA violence". On 29 May, the Official IRA declared a ceasefire, this was followed on 27 June by the Provisional IRA also declaring a ceasefire which loyalists regarded with suspicion, fearing it would lead to the British Government doing a secret deal resulting in a united Ireland. Representatives of the IRA and British Government held unprecedented secret talks in England, but these proved unsuccessful and the Provisional IRA's ceasefire ended in early July after a confrontation with the British Army in Belfast.

When the IRA exploded 22 bombs across Belfast in what became known as Bloody Friday, many Ulster Protestants, after seeing the televised carnage of victims' remains being scraped off the street and poured into plastic bags, rushed to join paramilitary organisations such as the legal Ulster Defence Association (UDA) or the illegal Ulster Volunteer Force (UVF). The bombings also led the British Army to launch Operation Motorman, which saw the arrival of an addition 4,000 troops to assist in the recapture of the mostly IRA-controlled "no-go areas" in Belfast and Derry. The dismantling of these "no-go" areas, which had been set up by residents in certain nationalist/republican districts to prevent access by the security forces, effectively prohibited the IRA from enjoying the same operational freedom it had known prior to the implementation of Operation Motorman. This made the Republic of Ireland a virtual safe haven for IRA members throughout the conflict, where they could operate in relative safety and continue to carry out operations in Northern Ireland.

The UVF was led by Gusty Spence, who was imprisoned since 1966 for a sectarian murder. In July 1972, his associates on the outside staged a fake kidnapping while Spence was on bail and he was at liberty for four months. During this period he organised the UVF into brigades, battalions, companies and platoons. These were all subordinate to the Brigade Staff (Belfast leadership) based on the loyalist Shankill Road. He also managed to obtain an arsenal of sophisticated guns and ammunition after a raid on King's Park camp, an Ulster Defence Regiment/Territorial Army depot in Lurgan by an armed UVF gang. The UVF also stole twenty tons of ammonium nitrate from the Belfast Docks. During the spring and summer of 1972, the UDA set up barricades and no-go areas in Belfast and paraded through the city centre in a massive show of strength.

William Craig, leader of the Unionist Vanguard movement, addressed a meeting of right-wing MPs in Westminster who belonged to the Monday Club on 19 October during which he claimed he could mobilise 80,000 men who "are prepared to come out and shoot and kill". On 28 October a bomb was found in Dublin's busy Connolly Station and fire-bombs detonated inside four Dublin hotels. On 4 November Spence was recaptured in Belfast by the British Army.

In response to the IRA members using the Republic of Ireland as a safe haven, the Irish Government began its clampdown against them in that same year. On 19 November the Provisional IRA's Chief of Staff, Sean MacStiofain was arrested in Dublin and immediately went on a hunger and thirst strike. The same month, a controversial amendment to the Offences Against the State Act, giving the Garda Síochána special powers to deal with the IRA and other subversives was brought before Dáil Éireann.

=== Keith and Kenneth Littlejohn ===
On 12 October 1972, an armed gang executed what was at the time the biggest bank robbery in Irish history. The robbery was carried out at the Allied Irish Bank's Grafton Street branch and the gang made off with £67,000. Four days later, Garda officers raided the Drumcondra residence of two Englishmen, brothers Kenneth and Keith Littlejohn where they recovered £11,000 of the sum taken. The brothers were arrested in England on 19 October and were flown to Ireland in March 1973 following the issuing of an extradition warrant from Dublin. Prior to and during their trial, the brothers claimed to be MI6/Official IRA double-agents who were introduced to the British security forces by Pamela Dillon, Lady Onslow, the Anglo-Irish ex-wife of William Onslow, 6th Earl of Onslow. She had become acquainted with Keith Littlejohn through her work with the ex-Borstal organisation "Teamwork Associates" in London.

Keith Littlejohn had spent time in Borstal, whilst Kenneth had served a prison sentence from 1965 to 1968 for robbery. During an encounter with Lady Onslow, Keith told her that his brother Kenneth "had information about arms and sources of arms for the IRA which might be of interest to Her Majesty's Government. He would be prepared to make this information available only if he could be seen by a Minister whose face he could recognise from having seen him on television". She passed on Keith Littlejohn's words to her friend, Lord Carrington, the Secretary of State for Defence. A meeting took place between Kenneth Littlejohn and the Under Secretary of State for Defence, Geoffrey Johnson Smith, at her London flat on 22 November 1971. After Littlejohn had told Johnson Smith what he knew about the IRA, Johnson Smith then put him in "touch with the appropriate authorities".

The Littlejohns claimed they were ordered to infiltrate the Official IRA and after this was accomplished, they were instructed by the British Ministry of Defence to act as agent provocateurs by carrying out robberies and other acts of violence in the Republic of Ireland to provoke the Irish Government into taking a stronger stance against the IRA and other republican subversives. The Ministry of Defence issued a statement acknowledging to having met Kenneth Littlejohn once to discuss information he had in his possession regarding the IRA but denied that he had worked for the Ministry and denied British Government involvement in the Dublin bank robbery.

The Official IRA, while admitting to having been acquainted with the Littlejohns after the brothers arrived in Newry in 1972, denied the brothers had ever been members of the OIRA. The Littlejohns were found guilty of bank robbery on 3 August 1973 and sentenced to imprisonment; Kenneth received 20 years and Keith 15 years. The brothers escaped from Dublin's Mountjoy Prison in 1974. In 1975, Lady Onslow received minor injuries when she opened a letter bomb which failed to detonate properly.

== The bombings ==
=== 26 November 1972, Burgh Quay ===
The first of the four bombs exploded on Sunday 26 November 1972 at 1.25 a.m. outside the rear exit door of the Film Centre Cinema, O'Connell Bridge House during a late night showing of a film. The bomb went off in the laneway connecting Burgh Quay with Leinster Market injuring 40 people, some very badly, including facial, leg and serious bowel wounds. There were 156 patrons and three employees inside the cinema at the time of the blast, although were no fatalities. The force of the explosion hurled customers out of their seats and onto the floor. There was much panic as people, fearing a second bomb would explode in their midst, rushed to escape from the crowded cinema. Shops and buildings in the immediate vicinity received extensive damage.

The area was sealed off by the Garda and they launched an investigation; a ballistic officer determined that the explosion's epicentre had been on a doorstep outside an emergency door leading to the laneway. However, no trace of the bomb or explosives used were ever found at the scene. The Gardaí interviewed a number of witnesses who came forward alleging to have seen the bombers in the laneway prior to the explosion and although photofits of the suspects were drawn up, the bombers were never apprehended. The Garda Síochána believed the bombing was carried out by republican subversives, including former associates of the Littlejohn brothers.

The night following the bombing an eight-man IRA unit unsuccessfully tried to free MacStiofain, who had been taken to Dublin's Mater Hospital for treatment due to adverse effects of his hunger and thirst strike on his health. The ward in which he was kept was under heavy police guard. The armed IRA unit exchanged shots with two members of the Garda Special Branch; one detective, two civilians and one of the IRA gang suffered minor injuries from gunfire.

=== 1 December 1972, Eden Quay and Sackville Place ===
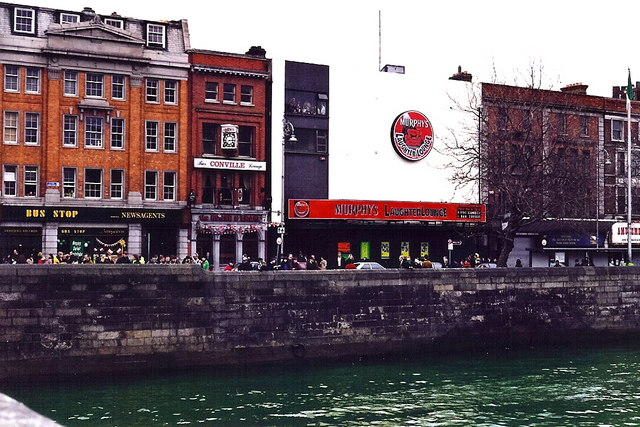
Eden Quay as it appeared in 1998

On Friday, 1 December 1972 at 19:58 a blue Hillman Avenger, registration number OGX 782 K, exploded at 29 Eden Quay close to Liberty Hall tower block. The blast blew the Avenger apart and what remained of the vehicle was catapulted 18 feet (5.5 m) away to rest outside an optician's office. A wall of flame shot up which was visible to people across the Liffey river on the opposite Burgh Quay. Six cars parked in the vicinity of the Avenger were set on fire and piled on top of each other; most of the windows of Liberty Hall and other nearby buildings imploded and the edifices were damaged. Although a number of people suffered injuries – some horrific – nobody was killed. One of the injured included a pregnant woman. Customers inside the quayside "Liffey Bar", near the explosion's epicentre, were hurt by flying glass and some had open head wounds. Following the explosion, a huge crowd of people hurried to the scene where police and ambulances had already arrived.

At exactly the same time the carbomb detonated in Eden Quay, the Belfast Newsletter received a telephone call from a man using a coin box speaking with a "Belfast English" type of accent. He issued a warning that two bombs would explode in Dublin. He gave the locations as Liberty Hall and Abbey Street behind Clerys department store. The newspaper immediately phoned the Royal Ulster Constabulary (RUC), who in turn relayed the warnings to the Garda Control Room at Dublin Castle at 20:08. A team of Gardaí were sent to investigate the area around Sackville Place and Earl Street.

A policeman ran into a CIÉ company canteen in Earl Place warning the employees inside to clear the building as there was a bomb scare. Just after the building was evacuated, at 20:16 a silver-grey Ford Escort, registration number 955 1VZ, exploded in Sackville Place 40 feet (12 m) away from its intersection with Marlborough Street, throwing people up in the air and in all directions, killing two CIÉ employees who moments before had left the canteen. The victims were George Bradshaw (30), a bus driver and Thomas Duffy (23), a bus conductor. Both men were married with children. Bradshaw, whose body was rendered unrecognisable by the effects of the blast, died of severe head injuries and Duffy was killed by a flying metal fragment which had lacerated his aorta. Henry Kilduff, a CIÉ bus driver later told Gardaí that he had seen Bradshaw and Duffy 10 or 20 yards away walking down Sackville Place towards Marlborough Street when the carbomb exploded beside them.

Denis Gibney, another co-worker, informed police that Bradshaw had been headed in the direction of Liberty Hall after hearing that a bomb had gone off near there. Bradshaw was found lying badly mangled beside a damaged car and was carried into a ruined shop front where a priest performed last rites. As at Eden Quay, the Sackville Place bombing caused considerable damage to buildings and vehicles near the blast's epicentre. Sackville Place is a narrow street off O'Connell Street, Dublin's main thoroughfare. There was further panic amongst the survivors when the petrol tank inside the burning bomb car exploded. A total of 131 people were injured in both explosions.

The two bombings had immediate political ramifications. Just as the bombs were exploding in the city centre, Dáil Éireann was debating the controversial bill to amend the Offences Against the State Act, which would enact stricter measures against the Provisional IRA and other paramilitary groups. As a result of the two attacks, the Dáil voted for the amendment which introduced special emergency powers to combat the IRA. In particular this meant that a member of the IRA or any other paramilitary group could be sentenced on the sworn evidence of a senior Garda officer in front of three judges. Before the bombings, many commentators had actually believed the bill – considered by some to be 'draconian' – would be defeated.

Thirteen days after the double-bombing, three incendiary devices were found in Dublin – one inside Clerys department store and the other two in the toilets of the "Premier Bar" in Sackville Place. The devices had failed to explode. According to journalists Jim Cusack and Henry McDonald, the devices were planted by the same UVF bomb unit that was responsible for the Eden Quay and Sackville Place car bombs.

=== 20 January 1973, Sackville Place ===
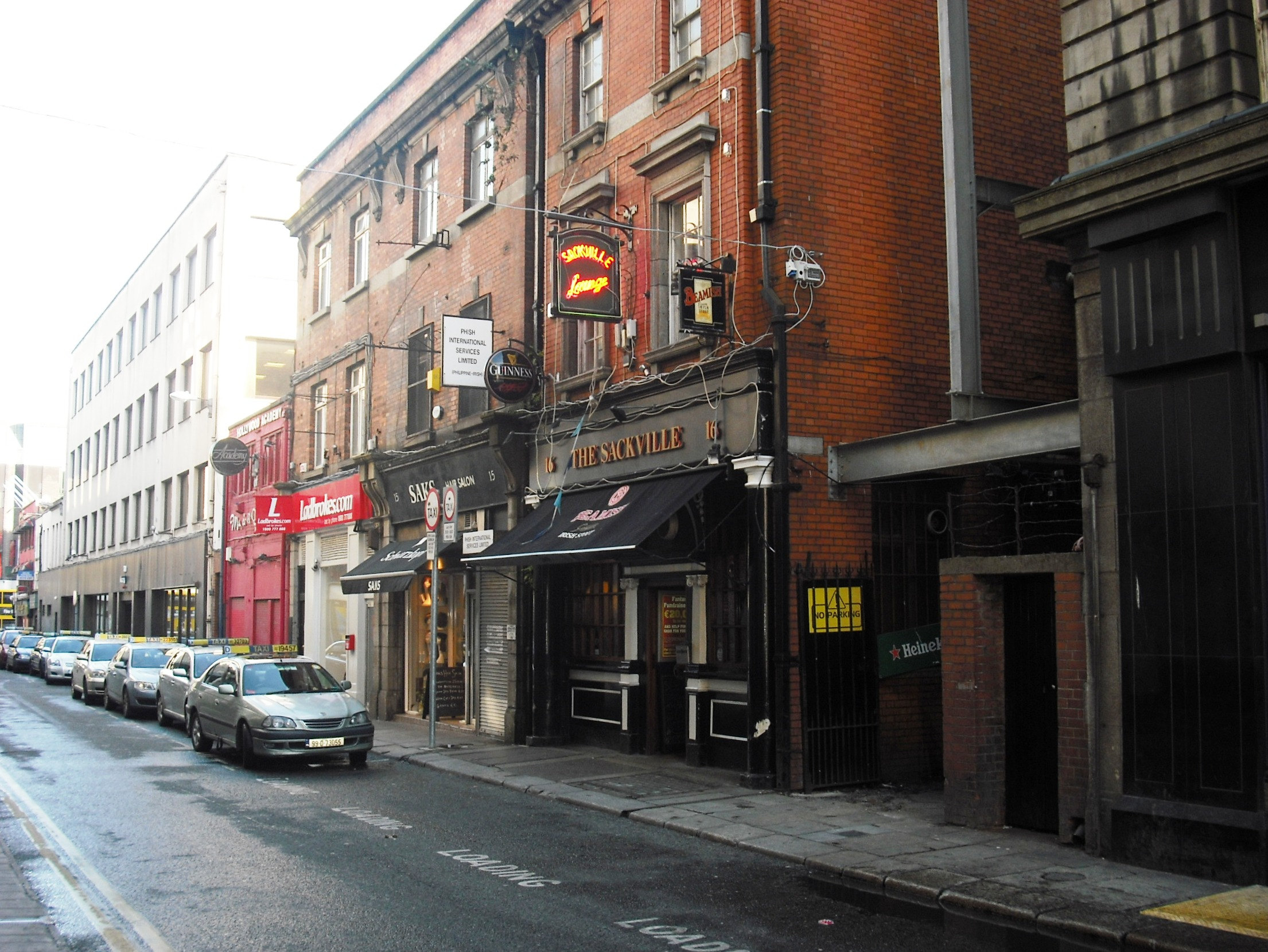
Sackville Place, as viewed from O'Connell Street, January 2012

On Saturday 20 January 1973 at 15:08, a male caller with an English accent rang the telephone exchange in Exchequer Street, Dublin, with the following bomb warning: "Listen love, there is a bomb in O'Connell Street at the Bridge". Although the call was placed from a coin box in the Dublin area, the exact location was never determined. The telephonist immediately contacted the Garda Síochána. The streets of central Dublin were more crowded than usual as Ireland was playing the All Blacks at an international rugby match being held that afternoon in Lansdowne Road.

At 15:18, a man leaving Kilmartin's betting shop in Sackville Place noticed smoke or steam emanating from the boot of a red Vauxhall Victor car parked outside Egan's pub facing the direction of O'Connell Street. Its registration number was EOI 1229. About five seconds later the bomb inside the red car's boot exploded, scattering sections of the vehicle and throwing the man to his feet. The explosion was so powerful that it hurled the car's roof over adjacent Abbey Street where it landed in Harbour Place; the right hand rear hub and axle sections were blasted through a metal grill on a shop window.

A CIÉ bus conductor, 21-year-old Thomas Douglas, originally from Stirling, Scotland, was passing the betting shop just as the bomb went off and the force of the blast hurled him through a shop front window where he died minutes later of shock and hæmorrhage from the multiple injuries he received in the explosion. The entire shop front was devastated and spattered with blood. Fourteen people were badly injured in the bombing which caused bedlam as hysterical Saturday afternoon shoppers sought to flee the area in panic and confusion. The carbomb detonated at almost the exact location of 1 December bomb. Later eyewitness accounts suggested it had been parked at the kerb several hours before it exploded. According to journalists Jim Cusack and Henry McDonald in their book UVF, the bomb was designed to cause widespread chaos and alarm throughout the city, and to inflict massive injuries upon shoppers and pedestrians as Saturday has traditionally been the busiest shopping day of the week for Dubliners.

== Garda investigation ==
No paramilitary organisation claimed responsibility for any of the bombings. The two bomb sites at Eden Quay and Sackville Place were carefully examined by members of the Garda Ballistics, Mapping, Fingerprint and Photographic sections. An Irish Army EOD officer was also part of the team. They first examined the wreckage of the bomb cars and craters left by the blasts. It was suggested that the explosives used in both attacks were of the Chlorate or Nitrate type. The concentration of blast damage to the rear section of both vehicles suggested that the bombs were placed in either the boots or behind the back seats. It was determined that timing devices were used in both the Eden Quay and the Sackville Place bombings.

Garda Detective Sergeant Eamon Ó Fiacháin, the head deputy of the Ballistics Section of the Garda Technical Bureau had been inside Eason's Book Shop in O'Connell Street when the bomb went off on 20 January. He immediately rushed to the scene in Sackville Place and made an examination of the area. As he measured the distance of the crater and inspected the damage done to the surrounding buildings, he discovered that the wreckage of the bomb car had been moved from the exact spot where it had detonated to allow the passage of Fire Brigade engines and ambulance workers to remove the dead and injured. Upon close inspection of the car, the section showing the greatest blast intensity led him to judge that the centre of the explosion took place on the driver's side in the rear of the vehicle, between the boot and the rear of the rear bench seat. He suggested the explosion itself was caused by a nitrate bomb. Among the debris he found a fragment of a test tube with traces of a white crystalline deposit. It was taken for analysis. The wreckage of the bomb car was also conveyed to the Garda Depot for technical examination. No conclusion was ever drawn as to the composition of the three bombs at Eden Quay and Sackville Place.

=== The bomb cars ===
Regarding the two bomb cars which exploded on 1 December 1972, Garda investigators in Belfast discovered that both vehicles had been hired in that city on 30 November 1972 by a man aged about 40 using the stolen driver's licence in the name of Joseph Fleming with an address in Derby, England. It transpired that Fleming's car had been stolen from a carpark in Ballymoney, County Antrim on 11 August 1972 and his documents including the driving licence had been taken as well. The Garda Síochána was satisfied that Fleming had had nothing to do with the two bombings. Descriptions of the man who hired the Ford Escort at Moley's car hire firm in Belfast's Victoria Square at 9.00 a.m. were provided. His accent was described as having been that of a cultured Englishman or a Belfast man who had spent time in England. The same man hired the Avenger at 11:30 from Avis car rentals at Aldergrove Airport. As with Moley's, the man used the Fleming driver's licence and paid with English bank notes rather than notes issued by banks in Northern Ireland. Police also discovered that Fleming's licence had been used on other occasions to hire cars. These other vehicles may have been scouting and getaway cars for the bombing team.

The Vauxhall Victor had been hired at noon on 19 January 1973 from Belfast Car Hire (Inc.) in Grovenor Road. The following morning at 08:30 as the hirer was driving along Agnes Street, off the Shankill Road, it was hijacked by two men. He was taken away by the hijackers and held hostage inside a building until 15:00 After receiving instructions by the hijackers to report the car theft to the Tennent Street RUC station, the man was deposited at the junction of Twaddell Avenue and Ballygomartin Road. At 15:20, he walked inside the RUC station as instructed where he made a statement to the police regarding the hijacking.

The Garda Síochána interviewed a number of witnesses who had seen the bomb cars at various locations in the Dublin area and en route. The original Northern Ireland registration plates had been retained on all three vehicles. The eyewitnesses gave descriptions of the cars' drivers and passengers which were used to make up photofits. The timing of the sightings of the cars used in the 1 December attacks indicated that the bombers had driven the vehicles down to Dublin on 30 November. A Garda standing outside the Drogheda Garda station on 20 January had registered all the vehicles with Northern Ireland and English registration plates. He had noted down the registration number of the red Vauxhall as it passed through Drogheda heading south towards Dublin at about 12:12; although he hadn't taken notice of the driver's appearance nor observed whether there were any passengers inside. The cars preceding and following the Vauxhall were subsequently traced, but their occupants were found to have had no connection to the Dublin attacks.

The suspects' photofits were circulated around hotels, guesthouses as well as bus, rail, air and train termini – all possible places where the suspects may have been observed. A photofit of the man who hired the cars in Belfast was passed on by Gardaí to the British Defence Forces. The Garda enquiries did not yield results and the bombers were never apprehended. No one has ever been charged in connection with the bombings.

== Allegations ==
=== The Ulster Volunteer Force ===
Suspicion initially fell on the Provisional IRA and other republican groups. Shortly afterwards, however the blame shifted to loyalist paramilitary organisations, in particular, the UVF. Gardaí received a telephone call from a male caller in Belfast who gave the names of five men who he claimed were responsible for 20 January carbomb. The caller said that the five men were originally from Belfast's Sailortown area but had since relocated to new housing estates in the city. It is not known what action, if any, was ever undertaken by the Garda Síochána to follow up this telephone call.

On 3 February 1973, a Garda Inspector informed the Superintendent of B District, Dublin that he had received confidential information from a reliable source confirming that 1 December and 20 January bombings had been perpetrated by the UVF. This source provided the following information specifically regarding 20 January attack: "A young man named from the Shankill Road area of Belfast planted the last car bomb in Sackville Place. This man should not be confused with ... who is one of the leaders of the UDA organisation in Belfast". This pertinent information was passed on to the RUC. The latter sent a reply back to the Gardaí on 12 April 1973 claiming to have "no hard evidence" on the perpetrators of the Dublin bombings. It continued to state: "We do have two persons named...from the area you mention who are believed to have UVF connections. They are fairly seasoned, the younger of the two being 40 years of age and I note you describe the person as being a young man..."

The UVF have never admitted responsibility for the bombings as they later did for the 1974 Dublin and Monaghan explosions.

=== British Army Intelligence ===
There were strong allegations that British Army Intelligence assisted the loyalists in carrying out the bombings, as part of a covert operation to influence the outcome of the voting in the Dáil regarding the amendment to the Offences Against the State Act.

A Dublin taxi driver made a statement to the Gardaí on the morning of 2 December regarding a passenger he picked up in Lower Baggot Street at 2.20 a.m. The passenger had a military-style haircut and spoke with an English accent. He first asked to be driven to the bomb sites and then wished to be driven north to Derry for the sum of £40. The driver agreed and they headed north. They were stopped at a Garda checkpoint at Slane and both men were questioned; when the Garda asked the passenger his name he replied "Major Glover", giving an address in London, and informed the policeman he was going to Enniskillen Barracks. During the course of the journey the man claimed he was a Major in British Intelligence and told the taxi driver that the bombings were carried out by MI5, adding that there were British soldiers in disguise in Dublin. The man also warned him that the "might of the British Army would cause more bombs in Dublin".

Upon reaching Enniskillen, the taxi driver was ordered down a dead-end road and the passenger told him if he wanted to get out alive he was to hand over all his money. After the frightened driver did as he was instructed he let the passenger off outside the Enniskillen RUC barracks and quickly drove back to Dublin. On 15 August 1973, at the Dundalk horse races, the taxi driver recognised the man and told a Garda Sergeant who arrested him. It emerged that the Englishman, who frequently visited Dublin, was mentally unstable with a criminal record for indecent behaviour and assaults against the police. His name was not Glover, he had never served with the British Armed Forces and there was no evidence to connect him with any of the bombings in Dublin.

An anonymous letter was sent to the editor of the Irish Times on 7 December 1972, six days after the double-bombing; it claimed that

The bomb explosions in Dublin were not the result of action by the IRA, UDR, UVF or any other farcical Irish organisation. Five members of the British Armed Forces were involved and they left Dublin not by car or train to Ulster but by plane to Heathrow

The sender of the letter was never traced. A copy of the letter and envelope in which it was sent was attached to the Garda investigation report.

On 18 December 1972, an Englishman named John Wyman was arrested under Section 30 of the Offences Against the State Act, 1963 and sent to Dublin's Bridewell Garda station for questioning. It was discovered that he was an agent working for British Intelligence services and had inveigled Detective Garda Patrick Crinnion from C3 Branch into providing him with classified Garda documents containing information on the IRA. Both men were charged with various offences under the Act and sentenced to three months imprisonment. Neither man was linked to the bombings, nor to the Littlejohns.

The Taoiseach at the time, Jack Lynch echoed these suspicions against British Intelligence in a televised interview he gave in 1973:

Well, my suspicions naturally are aroused more – we have no, as I said, indication who was responsible; and as it is now well known, a lot of people in Ireland believe that many of these unexplained activities and actions could well be related to British Intelligence or other activities of that nature.

These allegations of British Intelligence involvement have continued to persist even to the present day, despite the lack of evidence against British Army Intelligence or the security forces in Northern Ireland.

=== Jim Hanna ===
Journalist Joe Tiernan published allegations that the UVF's Belfast Brigade had carried out 1 December 1972 and 20 January 1973 bombings and that the bombing unit was led by Jim Hanna, Billy Mitchell and Ken Gibson. These men were all high-ranking UVF members, and Hanna, who had a seat on the Brigade Staff (UVF leadership) was described by Martin Dillon in his book, The Dirty War as the senior UVF commander in 1973. Tiernan also suggested that the bombing unit was controlled and directed by officers from the British Army Intelligence community operating from Army Headquarters in Lisburn. Tiernan was told by Billy Mitchell in interviews conducted in the 1990s that Hanna was "run as an agent" by four officers from Army Intelligence based at Lisburn, naming them as two captains, one lieutenant and an SAS officer.

Tiernan's allegations regarding Jim Hanna were published in 2004 in the Barron Report, which consisted of the findings of an official inquiry into the Dublin bombings of 1972 and 1973 commissioned by Irish Supreme Court Justice Henry Barron. Cathal Goulding, former Chief of Staff of the Official IRA told Tiernan in an interview that Hanna had personally admitted to him his leading role in the bombings. Tiernan published the following allegations regarding Hanna in a book he wrote about the 1974 Dublin and Monaghan bombings:

Throughout 1972/73 he [Goulding] and a number of his Official IRA colleagues held a series of meetings with UVF men, both in Belfast and Dublin, to discuss mutual working-class issues such as poverty, unemployment and bad housing in August 1973 a meeting to discuss such issues was held in the "West County Hotel" outside Dublin, attended by high-powered delegations from both organisations ... Towards the end of the evening, according to Goulding, Jim Hanna pulled him to one side and told him he wished to speak to him in confidence. "He asked me if we, the Official IRA, would be willing to carry out bank robberies here in the South, and they, the UVF, would claim them. Then, if we wished, they would carry out similar robberies in the North and we could claim them. He said Army Intelligence officers he was in contact with in the North had asked him to put the proposition to us as they were anxious to bring about a situation in the South where the Dublin government would be forced to introduce internment. When I refused to accept his proposition, as we were already on ceasefire, he put his hand on my shoulder and said, 'Look there's no problem. You see the car bombs in Dublin over the last year, well we planted those bombs and the Army provided us with the cars. There's no problem'. When I asked him how the bombings were carried out, he said the 1972 bombs were placed in false petrol tanks in both cars. He said they travelled down the main road from Belfast to Dublin and were stopped at a Garda checkpoint at Swords [North County Dublin] but because the cars were not reported stolen and the Gardaí found nothing suspicious in them they were allowed to proceed."

There was no mention in the Garda files of the cars used in the 1 December bombings as having been stopped at a Garda checkpoint in Swords or anywhere in the Republic of Ireland either that day or the previous day. Physically, Hanna was tall with red hair. He was about 25 years old at the time of the bombings. None of the eyewitness accounts mention a red-haired man in his mid-twenties as either a driver or passenger of the bomb cars seen in Dublin before the explosions. Journalist Kevin Myers, who knew Hanna quite well, confirmed that Hanna was the senior military commander in the UVF during this time period with links to British Army Intelligence. However, while he acknowledged the possibility that Hanna had carried out the Dublin bombings, he suggested that he was a "fantasist" who often "embellished or made up stories to make himself seem more impressive". Tiernan also alleged that Billy Mitchell was involved in the 1974 Dublin bombings, in which 26 people died.

Hanna was shot dead in April 1974 by UVF associates in an internal dispute. Mitchell, Ken Gibson and Cathal Goulding are also deceased. Gibson had succeeded Hanna as the UVF Chief of Staff following his killing.

=== Albert Baker's claims ===
Albert Baker, known by the nickname of "Ginger", was a former British Army soldier who deserted his regiment in July 1972 to join the then legal UDA. He was the ringleader of an East Belfast UDA unit known as the "Romper Room" gang which carried out a series of brutal "romperings". These were beatings and torture sessions followed by killings in UDA punishment centres called "Romper Rooms" after the children's television programme of the same name. He was convicted in 1973 of four sectarian murders and sentenced to 25 years imprisonment which he served in England rather than Northern Ireland. In 1974, at the murder trial of James McCartan (one of his victims), he testified against his former UDA colleagues, however the evidence he produced was dismissed as "unreliable" by the trial judge and the case subsequently dismissed. Whilst in prison he made a number of allegations against RUC collusion in loyalist paramilitary attacks. He also claimed that the UDA had perpetrated the 1972 and 1973 Dublin bombings, adding that one of the bombers was a member of the UDA's Inner Council, two others have since been imprisoned for other offences, and another has been shot dead. Baker's brother told journalist Frank Doherty of the Sunday World, that Albert claimed he had delivered explosions for the bombings from the UDA Londonderry Brigade and drove them from Eglington, County Londonderry down to the bombing team in Belfast. This unit then drove the car bombs to Dublin.

According to information given to Frank Doherty by members of Baker's family, 1 December bombings were planned by the UDA in the "Rangers Club", Chadolly Street in east Belfast's Newtownards Road area. One of the cars which had detonated in Dublin had been hired from a Belfast car firm by a "well-dressed Englishman" using a stolen driver's licence in the name of Joseph Fleming. Doherty claimed the "well-dressed Englishman" was a senior UDA member who was originally from England but was living in east Belfast in 1972. He had connections with Albert Baker.

The UDA leadership had publicly threatened to launch attacks in the Republic of Ireland with the aim of forcing the Irish Government into taking a more "hardline stance towards the IRA".

== 1974 Dublin and Monaghan bombings ==
The four bombings in Dublin were not the last. On 17 May 1974 during the evening rush hour, two units from the UVF's Belfast and Mid-Ulster Brigades exploded three no-warning car bombs in central Dublin, killing 26 civilians and injuring close to 300. Ninety minutes later, a fourth car bomb went off in Monaghan, killing another seven people. The Dublin bombs detonated in Parnell Street, Talbot Street, and South Leinster Street – all located in the city centre. The bomb in Monaghan exploded in North Street. According to Joe Tiernan, RUC Special Patrol Group officer John Weir, and British Army psychological warfare operative, Colin Wallace, the bombings were organised by the Mid-Ulster UVF brigadier, Billy Hanna, who personally led the Dublin bombing teams. Hanna (no relation to Jim), a former sergeant in the Ulster Defence Regiment (UDR) who had won the Military Medal for gallantry in the Korean War, had founded the brigade in his hometown of Lurgan in 1972. Senior UVF member Robin Jackson also helped carry out the Dublin attacks. Tiernan suggested that the bombs were transported to Dublin by Jackson in his poultry lorry with Hanna as his passenger. After Billy Hanna was shot dead outside his home in July 1975, Jackson assumed command of the Mid-Ulster UVF.

As in 1972 and 1973, nobody was ever charged in connection with the bombings which had been carried out on the third day of the Ulster Workers' Council Strike, however on 15 July 1993, the UVF issued a statement claiming responsibility for the attacks.

== Later years ==
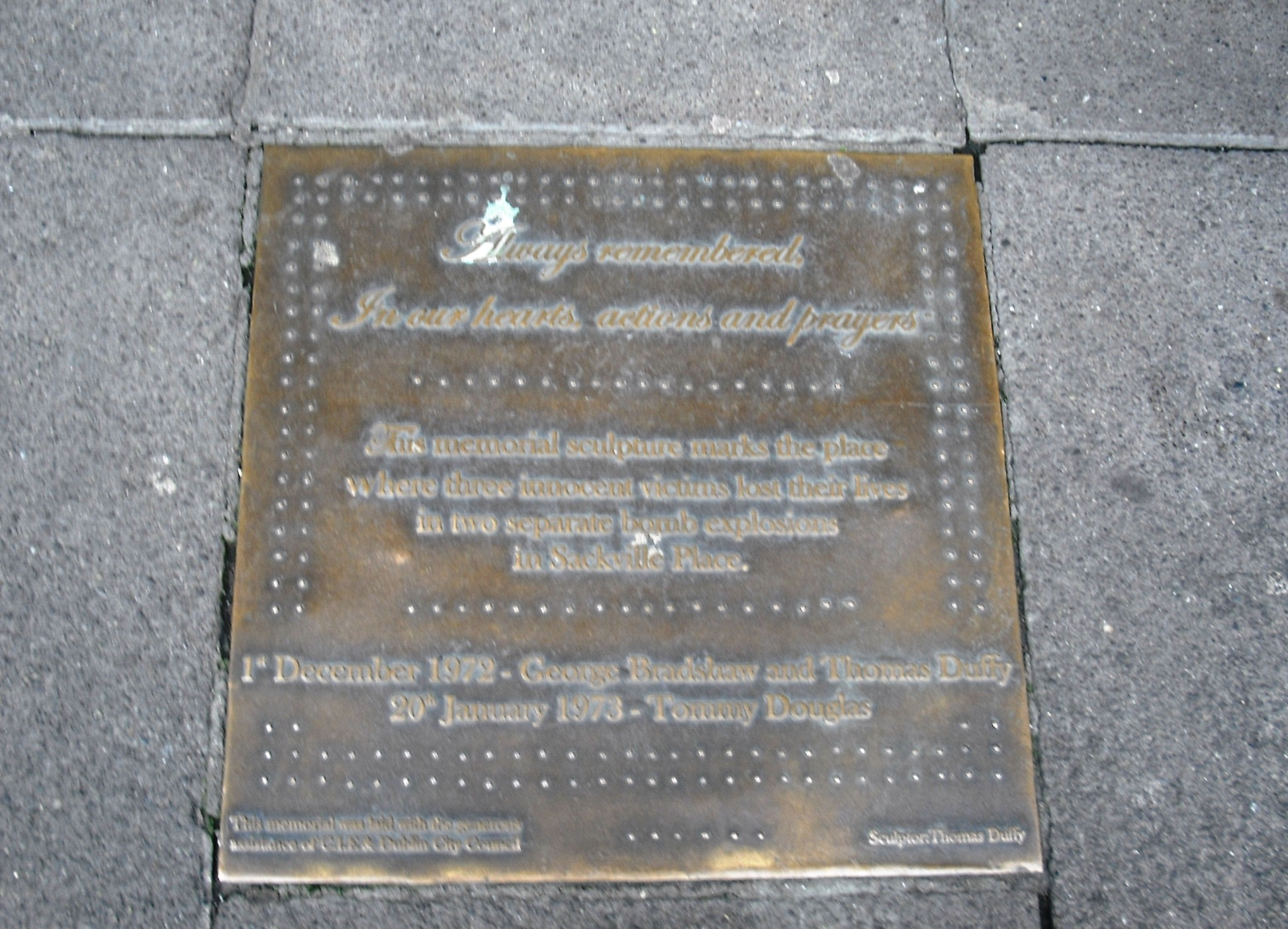
Plaque commemorating the dead on Sackville Place

In 2003, a bronze memorial sculpture, dedicated to the three victims of the 1972 and 1973 bombings, was unveiled in Sackville Place at its junction with Marlborough Street. The sculpture, entitled "Fallen Bouquet", is set into the pavement and was designed by Thomas Duffy, posthumously born son of the bus conductor killed in the 1 December attack, whose widow had been pregnant. It was commissioned by Dublin City Council and CIÉ.

Irish Supreme Court Justice Henry Barron commissioned an official inquiry into the bombings. The findings were published in a report in November 2004. The Inquiry concluded that it "seemed more likely than not" that the bombing of the Film Centre Cinema on 26 November 1972 was "carried out by Republican subversives as a response to a Government 'crackdown' on the IRA and their associates" and to influence the outcome of the voting in the Dáil regarding the passage of the controversial amendment to the Offences Against the State Acts.

Regarding 1 December 1972 and 20 January 1973 carbombings, the Inquiry concluded that confidential information obtained by the Gardaí indicated the three attacks were perpetrated by the UVF, "but no evidence was ever found to confirm this. Nor was there any evidence to suggest the involvement of members of the security forces in the attacks". The Dublin City Coroner's Court held an inquest in February 2005 into the deaths of George Bradshaw, Thomas Duffy, and Thomas Douglas. The jury of three men and four women returned a verdict of unlawful killing by persons or persons unknown for the three dead men.
