= The Last Roundup =

The Last Round Up, The Last Roundup, The Last Round-Up, or The Last Round-up may refer to:

- The Last Roundup (album), a 2004 album by the band Poco
- The Last Roundup (novel), a series of three novels by Roddy Doyle
- "The Last Roundup" (song), classic western song by Billy Hill
- The Last Round-Up (1934 film), a 1934 Randolph Scott film
- The Last Round-Up (1947 film), a 1947 Gene Autry film
- The Last Roundup (My Little Pony: Friendship Is Magic), an episode of My Little Pony: Friendship Is Magic
