= Jim Hanna (loyalist) =

Northern Irish loyalist paramilitary

- Born: James Andrew Hanna c. 1947; Lisburn, County Antrim, Northern Ireland
- Died: 1 April 1974 (aged 26–27) (body found); Mansfield Street, Shankill Road, Belfast
- Military career
- Allegiance: UVF
- Rank: Chief of Staff; Colonel
- Nickname: Red Setter
- Unit: Shankill Road UVF
- Conflict: The Troubles

James Andrew Hanna (c. 1947 – 1 April 1974), also known as Red Setter, was a senior member of the Northern Irish loyalist paramilitary organisation, the Ulster Volunteer Force (UVF) until he was shot dead by his subordinates, allegedly for being a criminal informant for British military intelligence. Journalists Joe Tiernan and Kevin Myers have described Hanna as the senior paramilitary leader of the UVF and that he was part of the UVF unit that planted car bombs in Dublin in December 1972 and January 1973 which left three people dead and 145 injured. Tiernan has also alleged that Hanna's primary handlers were four British Army Intelligence Corps officers, who frequently visited his home in Lisburn.

== Early life ==
Hanna was born in Lisburn, County Antrim, Northern Ireland in about 1947, and was raised in the Protestant religion. Physically he was tall and red-haired, and possessed an outgoing, friendly personality. He lived in his native Lisburn where he worked as a self-employed plumbing and heating engineer.

== Ulster Volunteer Force ==
He joined the Ulster Volunteer Force (UVF) on an unknown date, although he had come to prominence in the gun battles that took place between the Provisional Irish Republican Army (IRA) and UVF that took place during the early 1970s at Springmartin Road (an interface marking the approximate boundary between the loyalist Highfield estate area of the Greater Shankill and the republican Ballymurphy/New Barnsley areas). Despite being from Lisburn Hanna was a member of the Shankill Road UVF. He moved up in the ranks to eventually become a senior member of the paramilitary organisation and one of its Brigade Staff. According to journalist Joe Tiernan, he was the "head of the UVF in Northern Ireland". Kevin Myers also maintained he was the senior military commander for the UVF. Martin Dillon in The Dirty War stated that he was the senior UVF commander in 1973.

Tiernan alleged that together with Ken Gibson, a leading UVF member from East Belfast, and Billy Mitchell, a senior man from the Shankill Road, Hanna led the Belfast UVF team that planted car bombs in Dublin. These bombings were carried out on 1 December 1972 and 20 January 1973 and caused explosions near Liberty Hall on Eden Quay and Sackville Place, in the city centre, leaving a total of three people dead and 144 injured. Sackville Place, off Dublin's main thoroughfare, O'Connell Street, was bombed twice, first on 1 December, then again on 20 January; the three fatalities occurred there.

The bombing was allegedly assisted, enabled, and even directed by officers from the British Army Intelligence Corps at Army Headquarters in Lisburn. In several interviews Tiernan conducted with Mitchell in the 1990s, the latter recounted that Hanna (whom he tellingly referred to as "his boss") was "run as an agent" by four officers from Army Intelligence based at Lisburn, naming them as two captains, one lieutenant, and an SAS officer. These men were frequent visitors to Hanna's home in Lisburn and they brought him to Army Headquarters for regular briefings on how to conduct the UVF campaign. Mitchell further explained that Hanna's wife Susan unsuccessfully tried to persuade him to emigrate to the United States with the aim of removing him from the paramilitary violence of The Troubles and his equally dangerous association as an informant for the British Army. Kevin Myers, who enjoyed a close friendship with Hanna despite their political differences, had in his possession photographs Hanna had given him showing two senior British military intelligence officers in Hanna's house. Hanna was even posing with a regulation British Army rifle in one of the pictures, the weapon belonging to one of the two officers.

== Meetings with the Official IRA ==
Tiernan's allegations regarding Hanna were published in the 2004 Second Barron Report which was the findings of an official investigation into the 1972 and 1973 Dublin bombings commissioned by Irish Supreme Court Justice Henry Barron. Tiernan conducted an interview with Cathal Goulding, the former Chief of Staff of the Official IRA before his death in 1998 and the following allegation was made in regards to Hanna:

Throughout 1972/73 he [Goulding] and a number of his Official IRA colleagues held a series of meetings with UVF men, both in Belfast and Dublin, to discuss mutual working-class issues such as poverty, unemployment and bad housing. In August 1973 a meeting to discuss such issues was held in the West County Hotel outside Dublin, attended by high-powered delegations from both organisations ... Towards the end of the evening, according to Goulding, Jim Hanna pulled him to one side and told him he wished to speak to him in confidence. 'He asked me if we, the Official IRA, would be willing to carry out bank robberies here in the South and they, the UVF, would claim them. Then, if we wished, they would carry out similar robberies in the North, and we could claim them. He said Army Intelligence officers he was in contact with in the North had asked him to put the proposition to us as they were anxious to bring about a situation in the South where the Dublin government would be forced to introduce internment. When I refused to accept his proposition, as we were already on ceasefire, he put his hand on my shoulder and said, 'Look there's no problem. You see those car bombs in Dublin over the last year, well we planted those bombs and the Army provided us with the cars. There's no problem'. When I asked him how the bombings were carried out, he said the 1972 bombs were placed in false petrol tanks in both cars. He said they travelled down the main road from Belfast to Dublin and were stopped at a Garda checkpoint at Swords [North County Dublin] but because the cars were not reported stolen and the Garda found nothing suspicious in them they were allowed to proceed.

There was no mention in the Garda files of the cars responsible for the two 1 December 1972 bombings as having been stopped by Garda in Swords or anywhere in the Republic of Ireland that day. It is possible it was a reference to the Garda officer in Drogheda who took note of the 20 January 1973 bomb car's registration number as it passed through on the way to Dublin where it detonated in Sackville Place, killing one man. Kevin Myers was questioned by Justice Barron's Inquiry, as the journalist had become acquainted with Hanna in the spring of 1973. He admitted that Hanna was known to have had close ties to a number of British Army officers. He stated that while it was possible Hanna had been involved in the car bombings, he suggested that Hanna was a fantasist who often embellished and even fabricated stories to "make himself seem more impressive"; therefore not everything Hanna said was necessarily credible.

A fortnight after this Myers arranged for Hanna and Mitchell to attend a meeting at Lough Sheelin with Provisional IRA Army Council members Dáithí Ó Conaill and Brian Keenan. In what was a cagier meeting than that with the Officials the two groups attempted to find some ground due to Ruairí Ó Brádaigh's Éire Nua policy and Desmond Boal's advocacy of a federal Ireland, as both policies included a united Ireland as well as a significant degree of autonomy for either Northern Ireland or the province of Ulster within that unity. However Boal's idea was one that only he and a handful of supporters held and it certainly was not a plan endorsed by the UVF thus little came of these discussions.

== Killing ==
On 1 April 1974, Hanna was found dead inside an abandoned car in Mansfield Street off the Shankill Road, Belfast. He had been shot eight times in the head at close range. Hanna and his girlfriend had been waiting in the car outside the Rumford Street drinking club; she survived after being shot in both legs. There were rumours that Ken Gibson had organised the assassination; but there were also allegations Hanna had been killed by the UVF as an apparent informer. Suspicions had been raised after British security forces unearthed and seized a UVF arms dump near the pub two days earlier and as Hanna was well known to have close relationships with British Army intelligence personnel, he quickly fell under suspicion. According to Steve Bruce, Hanna was murdered for "touting" to the security forces. During the UVF supergrass trial of 1982, defence counsel Desmond Boal QC accused fellow UVF informer Joseph Bennett of carrying out Hanna's murder.

Following his death the UVF described Hanna as a "Brigade Officer", who held the rank of "full colonel responsible for operation control".

Hanna's inquest, during which his UVF membership was acknowledged, suggested that his killing might have occurred because he had "offended this organisation in some way". According to the then leader of the UVF's youth wing the Young Citizen Volunteers (YCV), who chose to remain anonymous, a power struggle followed Hanna's murder, as he was strongly admired by both the YCV and his former comrades in "Special Services", that is those operatives who took part in the gun battles on the Springmartin Road and other flashpoints near the republican Springfield Road.

The YCV commander claimed that the killing of Hanna eventually led to Gibson being removed from his position as head of the UVF in favour of the YCV chief, as well as the abandonment of Gibson's political arm, the Volunteer Political Party later that year.

Other offices
Preceded by Sam "Bo" McClelland	Ulster Volunteer Force Chief of Staff; 1973-1974	Succeeded by Ken Gibson
