= Billy Mitchell (loyalist) =

Northern Ireland loyalist (1940–2006)

- Born: 1940; Glengormley, Northern Ireland
- Died: 22 July 2006 (aged 65); Carrickfergus, County Antrim, Northern Ireland
- Resting place: Church of the Nazarene, Carrickfergus
- Other name: Richard Cameron
- Occupations: Copy boy, lorry driver, community worker
- Years active: 1966–2006
- Organization(s): Ulster Protestant Volunteers; Ulster Volunteer Force
- Known for: Ulster loyalist, community worker
- Political party: Progressive Unionist Party
- Criminal charge: Murder
- Criminal penalty: Life imprisonment
- Spouse: Mena
- Children: 2
- Military career
- Allegiance: Ulster Protestant Volunteers; Ulster Volunteer Force
- Service years: 1966–1979
- Conflict: The Troubles

William Mitchell (1940 – 22 July 2006) was a Northern Ireland loyalist, community activist and member of the Progressive Unionist Party. Mitchell was a leading member of the loyalist Ulster Volunteer Force (UVF) and served a life sentence for his part in a double murder. He later abandoned his UVF membership and took up cross-community work.

== Early years ==
Born in Belfast, Northern Ireland in 1940 into a poor family, Mitchell's father died when he was two years old. Although based in the Shankill Road during his adult life, Mitchell was raised just outside Belfast in what he described as "a wooden hut". The area, which at the time was the end of the city's tramline network, has subsequently been redeveloped as Glengormley.

After leaving school Mitchell briefly worked as a copy boy on the Belfast Telegraph but found it difficult to advance his position and so left to work as a lorry driver. Mitchell was attracted to the message of Ian Paisley and in the mid 1960s joined the Free Presbyterian Church of Ulster and served as a Sunday school teacher. He had been raised as a member of the Baptist faith.

== Ulster Protestant Volunteers ==
Mitchell first came to loyalism with the Ulster Protestant Volunteers in 1966. Mitchell would later state that he was prompted to join the UPV by scare stories circulating about plans for the fiftieth anniversary celebrations of the Easter Rising, with a rumour even suggesting that the Irish Republican Army intended to use it as pretext to take control of Newry. He was close to Noel Doherty, one of the group's founder, who sought to establish an armed paramilitary structure within the UPV. Doherty supposedly kept this plan from the group's other founder Ian Paisley — an assertion that’s been refuted by since uncovered evidence — by but allowed his closest confidantes, including Mitchell, to become involved in his attempts to set up a paramilitary group. Indeed, before long Mitchell became Doherty's right-hand man.

Through Mitchell Doherty made contact with the Shankill Road UVF and obtained gelignite for them from a UPV contact in Loughgall. Doherty was caught however and in November 1966 was sentenced to two years imprisonment for explosives offences.

== Ulster Volunteer Force ==
With the UPV a spent force following Doherty's jailing, Mitchell joined the UVF sometime in the late 1960s. Soon after Mitchell joined the UVF, the socio-religious and political conflict known as The Troubles broke out with an explosion of violence from both sides of the religious/political divide. As a consequence the UVF became much more active as violence escalated on both sides. Mitchell rose through the ranks to become one of the senior figures within the movement and was a member of its Brigade Staff (Belfast leadership). He also served as editor of the UVF magazine Combat. When writing for Combat he used the pseudonym 'Richard Cameron' which he took from one of his idols the Scottish Covenanter of the same name. However, by 1973 Mitchell had become weary of the constant struggle and became one of the main advocates within the group for a ceasefire and attempts to build a resolution. Like many loyalists of his generation Mitchell had been of the belief that the Troubles would be short and that the republicans would be defeated fairly quickly but this had not proven to be the case.

A ceasefire followed with Mitchell claiming at the time that he was tired of the failures of unionist politicians and felt that it was time for the UVF to take on a larger political role. He also reproached the unionists for their role of inciting paramilitary activity through their rhetoric but publicly distancing themselves from organisations like the UVF, contrasting it with the commitment of Edward Carson who made his leadership of the original Ulster Volunteers a matter of public record. Mitchell would later concede that whilst the idea of taking on political influence was in principle sound it suffered because of the lack of any political philosophy amongst the UVF leaders, who were rather working on a "gut feeling" that the unionist parties were failing to deliver.

== Meetings with opponents ==
As well as his public declarations in favour of a settlement Mitchell, with the support of the UVF leadership, also held secret talks with Irish republicans. These were arranged by the journalist Kevin Myers, who was close to Jim Hanna, a leading figure in the Shankill UVF. The first such meeting was with members of the Official IRA in Dublin, with Seán Garland and Cathal Goulding present throughout with Tomás Mac Giolla also briefly in attendance. The Officials felt that there was potential common ground, especially as Combat sometimes used left-wing rhetoric, but Mitchell felt that they were seeing more than was actually there and pointed out that Combat was an avowedly anti-communist publication that wrote in support of the far-right National Front. Indeed, Mitchell himself had been one of those to show the strongest levels of support for the National Front in the pages of Combat.

Mitchell also held a meeting at Lough Sheelin with Provisional IRA Army Council members Dáithí Ó Conaill and Brian Keenan. Attempts were made to find common ground in light of Ruairí Ó Brádaigh's Éire Nua policy and Desmond Boal's advocacy of a federal Ireland as a solution to the conflict. The talks however came to nothing as Boal's idea was largely a personal one and not one acceptable to either the UVF or the mainstream unionist leaders.

Around this time Mitchell and Volunteer Political Party leader Ken Gibson also met with Ian Paisley at his Martyrs' Memorial Church in a largely unsuccessful attempt to heal rifts that had opened between the paramilitaries and the United Ulster Unionist Council with the UVF feeling that they had been sidelined in the new coalition. By this time Mitchell had long since abandoned Free Presbyterianism, as had Gibson, a former member of the church.

== Feud ==
Following the collapse of the 1973 ceasefire Mitchell became embroiled in a Loyalist feud that would ultimately see him imprisoned. The roots of the feud lay in the Ulster Workers' Council strike when a brawl between members of the UVF and the Ulster Defence Association at a bar in the Tiger's Bay area of north Belfast saw UVF member Joe Shaw killed by a shotgun in what both groups initially agreed was a "tragic accident". However tensions were stoked by the UDA claiming the Dublin and Monaghan bombings, which had actually been a UVF attack, and drunken fights between members of the rival organisations became common, culminating on 21 February 1975 when east Belfast UDA man Robert Thompson was stabbed and killed in one such brawl. The feud reached a zenith on 7 April when Hugh McVeigh and David Douglas, the UDA members identified by an internal UVF inquiry as responsible for Shaw's death, were abducted and taken to the British Legion Club in Carrickfergus where they were severely beaten. From there they were taken to a clifftop spot at Islandmagee where they were forced to dig two graves before being shot dead and their bodies buried in them. It was five months before the bodies were discovered.

Mitchell had not been the gunman for either murder but he had been the senior ranking officer present throughout and had been with the UDA men as they were driven to their shallow graves. Mitchell was arrested for his involvement in the killings on 5 October 1975, a day after Merlyn Rees had declared the UVF to be an illegal organisation once again and as part of a Royal Ulster Constabulary (RUC) initiative that saw several dozen UVF members arrested, many on the basis of statements provided by informers. Following a 77-day trial that cost £2 million to conduct, Mitchell was one of four UVF members sentenced to life imprisonment for the murders. In handing down the life sentence, with a minimum recommended sentence of 25 years, Lord Justice MacDermott remarked that he believed Mitchell to be the overall leader of the UVF.

=== Alleged involvement in the 1974 Dublin bombings ===
According to journalist Joe Tiernan, Mitchell and an unnamed UVF commander from East Belfast stole a metallic blue mink Ford Escort from the Belfast Docks area on the morning of 17 May 1974. It was the third day of the UWC strike. The car was the property of William Shannon, a motor mechanic living in Holywood, County Down. He reported it as stolen to the RUC at 10.30 a.m. Tiernan maintained that Mitchell and the UVF commander drove the Escort across the Republic of Ireland border down to a Dublin car park without stopping. Upon reaching the car park on the northern outskirts of Dublin, they met up with the other members of the UVF bomb team. The organiser of the operation, Mid-Ulster Brigade leader Billy Hanna and senior UVF volunteer Robin Jackson loaded a bomb into the car's boot and Hanna then activated it. Bombs were also loaded into the boots of two other cars, which had been hijacked that same morning in Belfast. The three drivers were then given their final instructions by Hanna and drove off towards Dublin city centre. The Ford Escort stolen and delivered by Mitchell ended up in Talbot Street, where it exploded at approximately 5.30 p.m. killing a total of 14 people, mostly women, including one who was nine-months pregnant. This explosion followed the 5.28 blast in Parnell Street which had killed 10 people; at 5.32 a third car bomb went off in South Leinster Street, killing another two women outright. It is not known what role Mitchell played after he delivered the stolen car to the North Dublin car park.

== In prison ==
Within the UVF the influence of imprisoned leader Gusty Spence had been on the wane and the instructions that he sent out, whilst sometimes acted upon, were often ignored and according to Mitchell on one occasion he even scrawled the word "bollix" across one of Spence's handwritten communiques. Inside the Maze prison Mitchell was one of a group of UVF men, including Billy Hutchinson, David Ervine, Eddie Kinner and William "Plum" Smith, who came under the influence of Spence, who was advocating a more political approach by the UVF. Within the Maze Mitchell held the post of UVF "administration officer" and prepared an ordinance in November 1978 aimed at providing educational and library facilities for UVF prisoners.

In 1979 Mitchell, who had previously been a Baptist and a Free Presbyterian, became a born-again Christian and renounced his UVF membership.

== Post-release ==
Mitchell was released from prison on licence in 1990. He quickly became a member of the Progressive Unionist Party (PUP) and became involved in "conflict transformation" schemes in interface areas of north Belfast, working alongside republicans. Mitchell described himself as both an evangelical and a Christian socialist and criticised the politics of Paisleyism, claiming that Paisley's aim was theocracy. As part of his attempts to foster cross-community dialogue he wrote a column for the Irish nationalist North Belfast News.

In 1999 Mitchell became involved with former IRA hunger striker Tommy McKearney and the two produced a magazine together aiming to discuss the ideological differences and similarities between republicanism and loyalism. The two remained close and toured the Maze Prison together in 2003.

== Death ==
Mitchell died of a heart attack on 20 July 2006 and was buried at the Church of the Nazarene in Carrickfergus on 25 July. His funeral was attended by PUP leader David Ervine, leading republicans, representatives of Sinn Féin as well as members of the UVF, Red Hand Commando and clergy of various denominations.
