= Ken Gibson (loyalist) =

Northern Irish politician

- Ken Gibson with VPP rosette, 1974
- Born: Kenneth Gibson; East Belfast, Northern Ireland
- Occupation: Manual worker
- Known for: Chairman of the Volunteer Political Party (VPP); Spokesman and Chief of Staff of the Ulster Volunteer Force (UVF)

Kenneth Gibson was a Northern Irish politician who was the Chairman of the Volunteer Political Party (VPP), which he had helped to form in 1974. He also served as a spokesman and Chief of Staff of the loyalist paramilitary organisation, the Ulster Volunteer Force (UVF).

== Ulster Volunteer Force ==
Born in predominantly unionist East Belfast, Northern Ireland, Gibson was brought up in the Willowfield area. He was a member of the Free Presbyterian religion before splitting with the church. He had been active as a member of the Sunday men's Bible study group at the Martyrs' Memorial Church, the Free Presbyterians' headquarters on the Ravenhill Road in south-east Belfast. From an early age he identified strongly with loyalism and Unionism. Author Sarah Nelson described him as a "skilled manual worker".

In the early stages of The Troubles, he joined the loyalist Ulster Volunteer Force (UVF) and soon had a seat on its Brigade Staff (Belfast leadership on the Shankill Road). According to journalist Joe Tiernan, Gibson, leader Jim Hanna from the Shankill Road UVF, and senior West Belfast member Billy Mitchell, comprised part of the UVF team that planted the Liberty Hall and Sackville Place car bombs in Dublin in December 1972 and January 1973, which left a total of three men dead and 133 people injured. Tiernan also maintained that Gibson and his bombing unit were directed and controlled by officers from the British Intelligence community operating out of Army Headquarters in Lisburn. From January 1973 to December of that year Gibson, described as a "top intelligence officer" in the UVF, was interned in Long Kesh Prison. This experience inside Long Kesh, including contact with Gusty Spence, left him a vehement opponent of internment and a critic of Ian Paisley and the Democratic Unionist Party (DUP), Gibson having previously been chairman of the DUP East Belfast Branch. He then became a leading figure in the Loyalist Association of Workers, a joint UVF-Ulster Defence Association (UDA) front organisation which was eventually merged into the Ulster Workers' Council.

By 1974 Gibson was the UVF's Chief of Staff or Brigadier-General as well as the official spokesman. With the Supreme Commander Gusty Spence in prison since 1966, Gibson became the organisation's "leading personality". Tim Pat Coogan has stated that in 1974 Gibson was the "leader of the UVF". He was one of the organisation's strike leaders during the Ulster Workers' Council Strike in May 1974, having been brought onto the UWC's central committee the previous March. Indeed, Gibson had been one of only three paramilitaries to be invited to the secret meeting with Stanley Orme that was held immediately prior to the strike in an attempt to avoid the industrial action. The others in attendance were UDA commanders Andy Tyrie and Tommy Lyttle. When asked a direct question by Orme, Gibson, who was the trio's representative, replied: "We are only here as observers". The general strike had been called by unionists and loyalists to protest against the Sunningdale Agreement. This was an attempt at power-sharing, setting up a Northern Ireland Executive and a cross-border Council of Ireland which would have given the Irish Government a voice in running Northern Ireland. On 17 May 1974, the third day of the UWC strike, the UVF exploded three no-warning car bombs in the city centre of Dublin and a fourth car bomb in Monaghan, resulting in the deaths of 33 people. Almost 300 were injured; many scarred and maimed for life. Nobody was ever charged in connection with the bombings which were carried out by units from the UVF's Belfast and Mid-Ulster brigades.

Classified government documents discovered by the Pat Finucane Centre reveal that Gibson was one of a four-man UVF delegation that secretly met with MI6 officials in Laneside, a house in Holywood, County Down which was used by the British Secret Service for clandestine meetings. The meeting between the UVF and MI6 commenced 10 days after the car bombings and lasted over two days. The other three UVF members present at the talks were Tom Best, Stanley Grey and John Falls. Gibson was concerned that the interests and opinions of the loyalist working-class were being ignored by the United Ulster Unionist Council (UUUC) politicians who were instead using the UWC strike for their own ends. He also demanded more UVF participation in politics. Gibson also discussed his support of the return of IRA prisoners Dolours and Marion Price to Northern Ireland along with loyalist prisoners held in England.

== Volunteer Political Party ==
Following his release from prison in 1973, Gibson was chosen to serve as the public spokesman for the UVF. He was subsequently appointed as the Chairman of the short-lived Volunteer Political Party (VPP) that was formed in June 1974 by members of the UVF, which had been legalised two months before by Secretary of State for Northern Ireland, Merlyn Rees.

He publicly stated that the new party endorsed the idea of the establishment of an all-party talks forum, a policy that was seen as attractive to the British government. Gibson also added that if the UVF's efforts did not yield results then "there's going to be nothing left in Northern Ireland but for the Ulster Volunteer Force to go ahead and fight for Ulster". Gibson's campaign also focused on the poor standard of social housing on the Shankill Road, in particular the blocks of flats that were known colloquially as "Weetabix" due to a supposed resemblance to the cuboid shaped, crumbly breakfast cereal.

In part due to their focus on social deprivation Gibson and the VPP were attacked by a number of unionist politicians, most notably Rev Martin Smyth and John Taylor of the Ulster Unionist Party, who suggested that their working class approach to politics represented a form of communism. Much of this stemmed from the "Ulster Citizens Army", a supposedly loyalist paramilitary group that wrote a series of letters to the press expressing left-wing views on paper headed with the left-wing republican starry plough emblem. Rumours circulated that this group was in fact the UVF and that they had gone over to communism, although in fact the Ulster Citizens Army had never existed and was simply black propaganda spread by the British Army press office in Lisburn, known colloquially as the "Lisburn Lie Machine". For their part the UVF issued a statement in their magazine Combat stating that they and the VPP were opposed to "all shades of communism, socialism and liberalism". Gibson also disavowed the Ulster nationalist ideas being proposed by the likes of Glenn Barr and Kennedy Lindsay at the time, arguing that Northern Ireland was too small to be economically viable as an independent state. Gibson, out of frustration with his party's inability to win support from ordinary, working-class people, hit the table one night shouting: "Scum, rats [the politicians and Orangemen] 'I've told the people out there, but they're afraid. I've told them, you can run this country, you can have anything you want.'"

Gibson stood as the VPP's candidate for the West Belfast constituency in the October 1974 General Election. His candidacy came in for criticism from within the UVF. Gusty Spence, who supported the formation of the VPP, criticised Gibson's decision to run for election, arguing that it was much too soon for the party to think about making any inroads on the mainstream unionist vote. Stronger criticism came from an anonymous commentator, identified by Jim Cusack and Henry McDonald as a "senior west Belfast UVF figure at the time", who claimed that not only did Gibson attempt to force him out of his role as head of the Young Citizen Volunteers but even accused Gibson of orchestrating the assassination of former UVF Chief of Staff Jim Hanna, who was killed on 1 April 1974. Although Gibson received the support of West Belfast UDA leader Charles Harding Smith, Glenn Barr of Vanguard and independent Shankill councillor Hugh Smyth, he finished fourth behind the Democratic Unionist Party (DUP) candidate John McQuade, who garnered 16,265 votes against Gibson's 2,690, with the seat won by the incumbent MP, Gerry Fitt of the Social Democratic and Labour Party (SDLP).

The VPP was dissolved shortly afterwards as the UVF accepted there was little interest in their forming a political arm. As a result, Hugh Smyth was elected to the Northern Ireland Constitutional Convention in 1975 as an independent Unionist.

== Feud ==
In July 1974 a loyalist feud between the UVF and the UDA broke out in east Belfast, where the UDA was much larger, as part of a wider deterioration in relations between the two paramilitary groups. As part of this strife Gibson had a grenade lobbed at his house by local UDA members. Gibson publicly accused the UDA of "gangster activities" in the aftermath of the attack. As the conflict escalated the UDA attempted to abduct Gibson outside an east Belfast bar on 6 May 1975. He broke free but broke his arm in the struggle before UVF members drinking at the bar came out to help him. In the resulting struggle one UDA member was shot and another stabbed, neither fatally. The UVF responded to the attack on Gibson by attempting to blow up Roberta House, the Newtownards Road headquarters of the east Belfast UDA. The bomb, which journalists Jim Cusack and Henry McDonald stated was being transported by UVF member and future Progressive Unionist Party leader David Ervine, was intercepted by security forces whose presence in the area had increased as a result of the feud.

Around this time Gibson and Billy Mitchell met with Ian Paisley at his Martyrs' Memorial Church in a largely unsuccessful attempt to heal the rifts that had opened between the paramilitaries and the UUUC with the UVF feeling that they had been sidelined in the new coalition. Gibson had already criticised Paisley for his failure to take the Carson route of publicly supporting the UVF. Both Gibson and Mitchell had been members of the Free Presbyterian Church of Ulster, although by the time of the meeting they had both long since left the religion.

== Later life ==
By the time the UVF was banned again, in October 1975, Gibson was no longer a member of its leadership but continued to give political advice to its Brigade Staff. However, he made a show of presenting himself at a local police station to announce his membership of the group. He was turned away, the police remaining indifferent. Several years later, he gave an interview to the Belfast Telegraph, in which he stated that he "wouldn't touch politics again".

Other offices
Preceded by Jim Hanna	Ulster Volunteer Force Chief of Staff; 1974	Succeeded by Unnamed Chief of Staff
