= The Dead Republic =

Novel by Roddy Doyle

- First edition
- Author: Roddy Doyle
- Language: English
- Series: The Last Roundup
- Publisher: Jonathan Cape
- Publication date: March 25, 2010
- Publication place: Republic of Ireland
- Pages: 336
- ISBN: 978-0-224-09009-4
- Preceded by: Oh, Play That Thing!

The Dead Republic: A Novel is a 2010 novel by Irish author Roddy Doyle which concluded The Last Roundup trilogy. The first book in the trilogy was A Star Called Henry (1999), and the second was Oh, Play That Thing! (2004).

== Plot ==
An aging Henry Smart is attempting to cement his reputation. John Ford plans a movie based on Henry's life, but Henry eventually realizes the film that Ford has planned will reduce his story to sentiment. Henry plans to kill Ford, but his callousness has faded, and he drifts into the Dublin suburbs, where he meets a respectable widow who may possibly be his long-disappeared wife. Henry ages in obscurity until the 1970s, when he is caught up in the 1974 Dublin car bombings and the Provisional IRA uses a distorted version of Henry's story as a public relations ploy.

== Reception ==
The Daily Telegraph said "Doyle’s eye for the light and shade of style and register in Irish speech and his dissection of the island’s shibboleths are masterly, but the Hollywood episodes with Ford read like schematics rather than windows into character. Doyle is doubtlessly speaking from the heart about the difficulties of seeing a script go through the movie mill but it’s too much and not enough at the same time."
