= Sackville Place =

Street in Dublin, Ireland

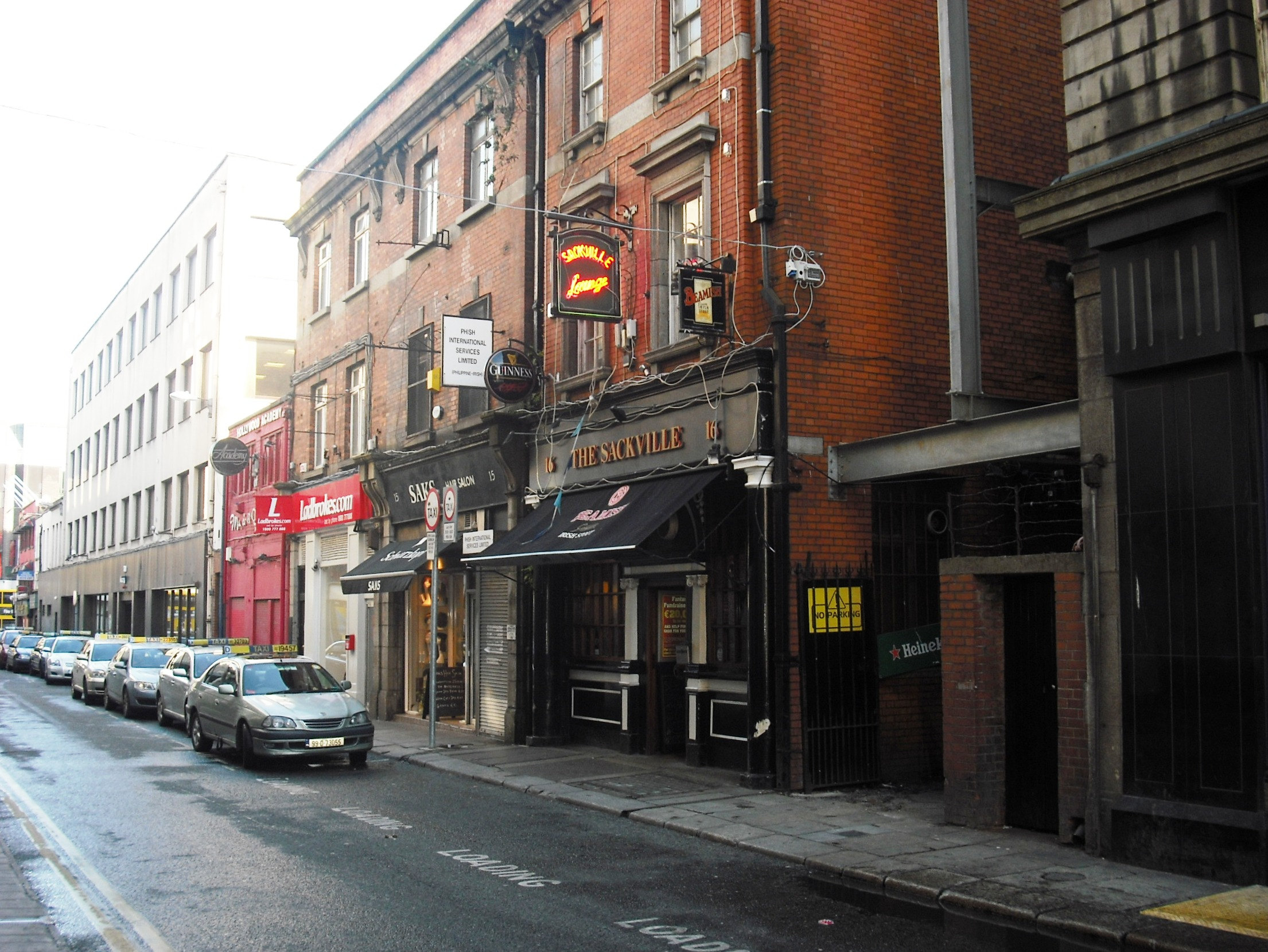
- Sackville Place,as viewed from O'Connell Street, in 2012
- Interactive map of Sackville Place
- Native name: Plás Sackville (Irish)
- Former names: Tucker's Row, Mellifont Lane
- Namesake: Lionel Sackville, 1st Duke of Dorset
- Location: Dublin, Ireland
- Postal code: D01
- Coordinates: 53°20′57″N 6°15′31″W
- west end: O'Connell Street
- Major junctions: Earl Place
- east end: Marlborough Street

Sackville Place (Irish: Plás Sackville) is a street in Dublin which connects O'Connell Street to the west and Marlborough Street to the east.

== History ==
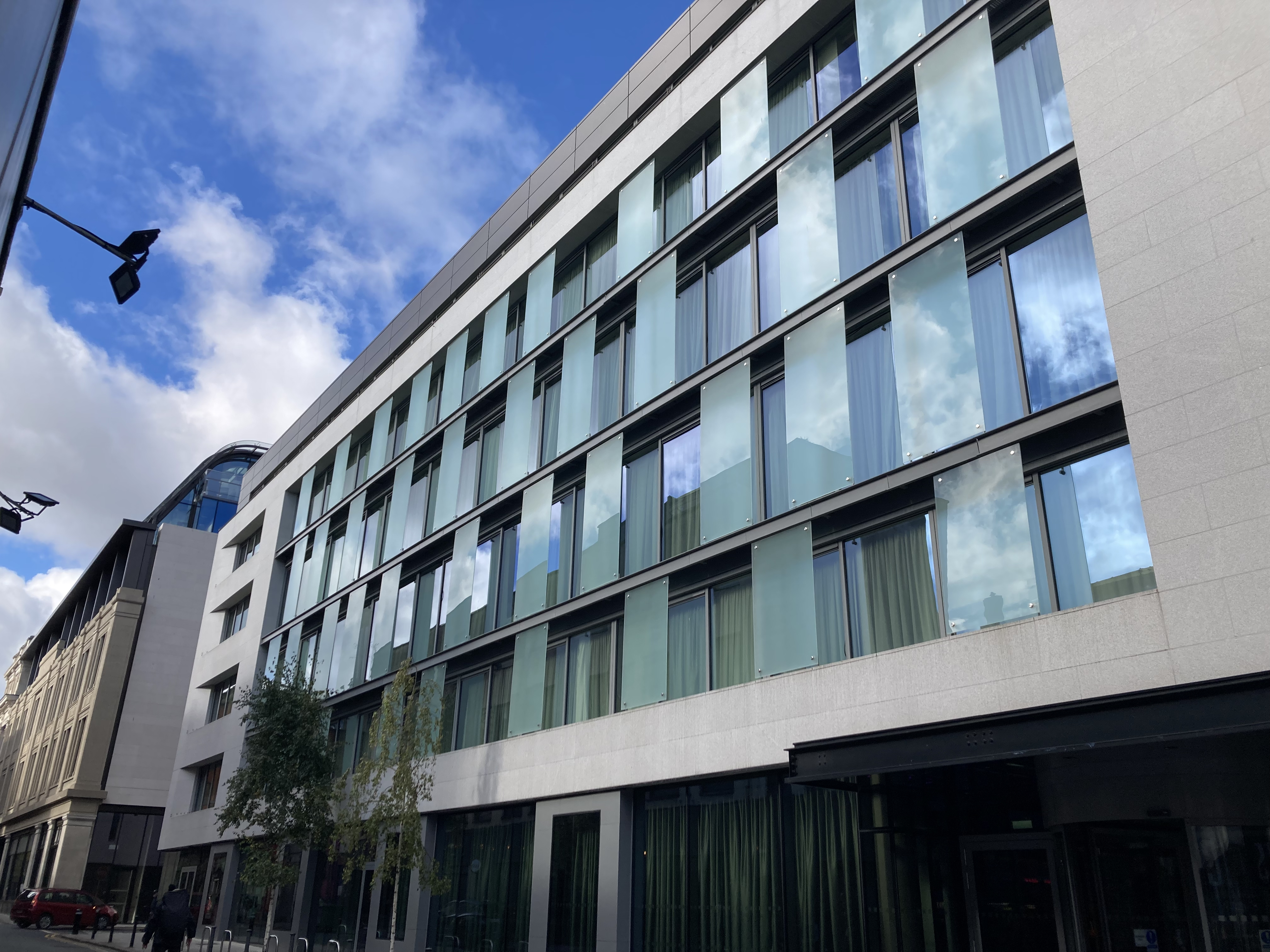
Moxy Hotel, Sackville Place

Sackville Place appears first on maps as Tucker's Row, named for George Tucker who was City Sheriff in 1731. It has also been known as Mellifont Lane, due to its proximity to the former Mellifont Abbey. In the 1750s, with the work of the Wide Streets Commission, Sackville Street (now O'Connell Street) was named for Lionel Sackville, 1st Duke of Dorset, with Sackville Place appearing on maps from 1836.

Number 16 is the pub, The Sackville, which is a 1920s red brick pub shopfront built during the rebuilding of the wide O'Connell Street area following the Easter Rising in 1916. Another example of this period of reconstruction is Unity House, on the corner of Sackville Place and O'Connell Street, dating from 1918 with Art Deco and Edwardian Baroque elements.

Numbers 6 to 12 were previously the site of the Dublin Institute of Technology School of Culinary Arts, which was demolished following the sale of the site to be redeveloped as a hostel. The brutalist 1970s, Sackville House, on the northern side of the street was demolished and redeveloped as a hotel facing on Marlborough Street.

=== 1972 and 1973 Dublin bombings ===
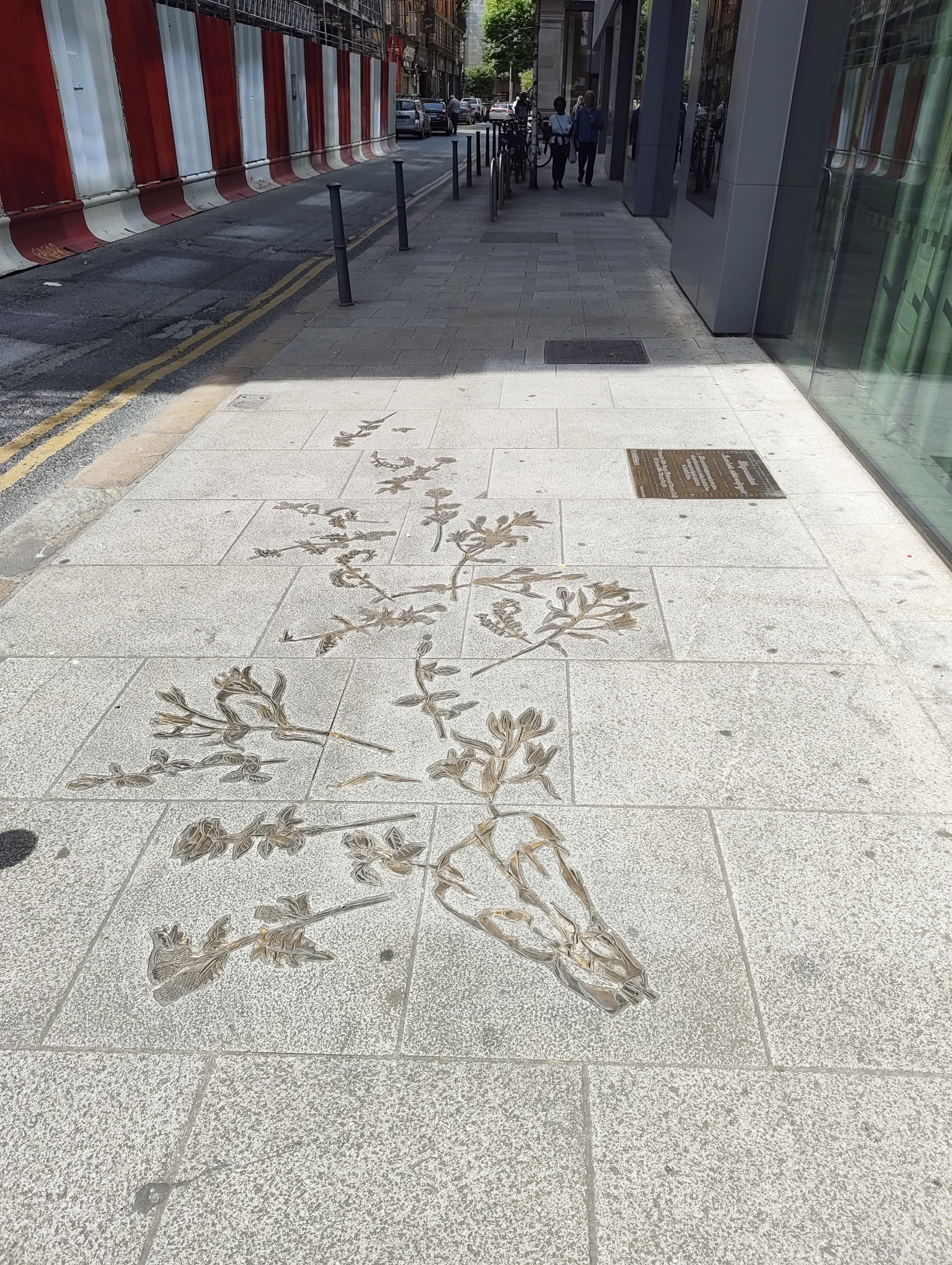
Memorial to the 1972 and 1973 Dublin bombings

Sackville Place was the site of two bombings in 1972 and 1973. There is plaque set into the footpath of the street commemorating the three people who died in those bombings: George Bradshaw and Thomas Duffy on 1 December 1972, and Tommy Douglas on 20 January 1973. The sculptor, Thomas Duffy, was the son of one of the victims, and it was unveiled in 2004 by CIÉ and Dublin City Council.
