= A Star Called Henry =

1999 novel by Irish writer Roddy Doyle

- First edition
- Author: Roddy Doyle
- Language: English
- Series: The Last Roundup
- Genre: Historical fiction
- Publisher: Jonathan Cape
- Publication date: 1999
- Publication place: Ireland
- Media type: Print
- Pages: 352
- ISBN: 978-0-224-06019-6
- OCLC: 57672557
- Followed by: Oh, Play That Thing

A Star Called Henry (1999) is a novel by Irish writer Roddy Doyle. It is Vol. 1 of The Last Roundup series. The second installment of the series, Oh, Play That Thing, was published in 2004. The third, The Dead Republic, was published in 2010. The book follows the early life of Henry Smart, from his childhood in the slums of early 20th century Dublin to his involvement in the Easter Rising and the Irish War of Independence.

== Plot summary ==
The novel is set in Ireland in the era of political upheaval between the 1916 Easter Rising and the eventual truce signed with the United Kingdom in 1921, seen through the eyes of young Henry Smart, from his childhood to early twenties. Henry, as a member of the Irish Citizen Army, becomes personally acquainted with several historical characters, including Patrick Pearse, James Connolly and Michael Collins. Energized by Sinn Féin's victory in the general election of 1918 and the party's establishment of the independent Irish Republic, Henry trained the men in the Soloheadbeg Ambush, the first engagement of the Irish War of Independence.

Later, he becomes a gunman in the ensuing guerilla war against the British, setting barracks on fire, shooting G-men and training others to do the same. At the end of the novel, Henry comes to think that the endless violence and killing of innocent people has little to do with the concept of a free Ireland, or the prospect of a better life in Ireland and more about personal gain.

== Relationship with history ==
In the novel, Doyle takes an approach similar to Little Big Man, Forrest Gump, and Zelig in introducing a fictional character in an historical setting and having that character interact with real historical characters. An early example in the novel is when James Connolly shows Henry a draft of the 1916 proclamation and Henry suggests adding the line "cherishing all the children of the nation equally".

== Cover ==
One cover to "A Star Called Henry" features a young member of the Irish Republican Army on patrol. The young man in question is Phil McRory.

== Reception ==
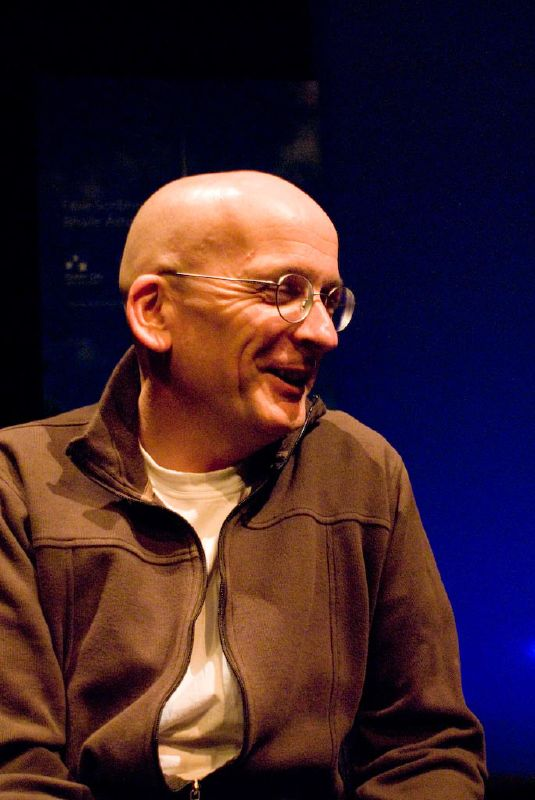
Roddy Doyle, author of A Star Called Henry

While Doyle had addressed issues in his previous novels that indicated his revisionist and atheist perspective on Irish history before, in A Star Called Henry he tackled these ideas at a far more ambitious scale. Many reviews of the book took issue with his political opinions rather than the novel itself; however, aspects of the writing were criticised too. The novel was nominated for a Bad Sex Award in 1999.

Irish reviewers with their own opinions of Irish history tended to be more reserved in their appraisal of the novel than British and American reviewers. Richard Bernstein in The New York Times noted that "Doyle's new novel never lets up. It is an unrelenting tumult of events recounted with tremendous verbal intensity. But it also seems much of the time to be tumult and intensity for its own sake -- a contrived larger-than-lifeness." and that "The prodigal, extravagant quality of Doyle's new book is evident from the beginning ...". The A.V. Club described it as "extraordinary" and said that "Doyle has fashioned a gratifyingly complex character around which to build his series".

In The Guardian, Roy Foster notes "The novel's greatest triumph is to recreate this world in Doyle's distinctive shorthand, without any creaky historical set pieces, and make it utterly convincing".

In German-speaking countries it provoked mixed reactions. Reviewers with a penchant for Irish literature and history tended to rate it positively, while critics without this specialist knowledge sometimes rejected the novel. Doyle's language in particular was controversial; the content was widely regarded as excessively vulgar and unnecessarily brutal, and the style too artificial.
