= Oh, Play That Thing =

2004 novel by Roddy Doyle

- First edition
- Author: Roddy Doyle
- Language: English
- Series: The Last Roundup
- Publisher: Jonathan Cape
- Publication date: 2004
- Media type: print
- Pages: 384
- ISBN: 978-0-143-03605-0
- Preceded by: A Star Called Henry
- Followed by: The Dead Republic

Oh, Play That Thing (2004) is a novel by Irish writer Roddy Doyle. It is Vol. 2 of The Last Roundup series, and follows on from Vol. 1, A Star Called Henry.

== Plot summary ==
Having fallen foul of his erstwhile comrades in the Irish Republican Army (IRA), Henry Smart escapes to America. In New York City, he becomes involved in advertising, pornography and bootlegging. After stepping on the toes of the Mob, Henry heads for Chicago, where he becomes the manager and partner-in-crime of Louis Armstrong. He becomes reunited with his wife and daughter, and, much to his dismay, the IRA.
