= The Last Roundup (novel series) =

Trilogy of novels by Irish writer Roddy Doyle

The Last Roundup is a series of three novels by Irish writer Roddy Doyle that began in 1999. They follow the life of Henry Smart from Ireland to America spanning most of the 20th century. The series is narrated by Henry as well, providing us the "Omniscient Narrator." Three books have now been published: A Star Called Henry (1999); Oh, Play That Thing! (2004); and The Dead Republic (2010).

== Volume I: A Star Called Henry (1999) ==
Henry S. Smart, born in Dublin, 1901, becomes a character of epic proportions from the moment of his birth. His one-legged father, known by the name of Henry Smart as well, vanishes without a trace, forcing Henry to abandon his mother, Melody Smart, and take to the streets of Dublin with his younger brother Victor, where they are forced to survive by any means possible. Henry is five years old, and Victor two years younger.

By age fourteen, Henry has survived long enough to take part in the Easter Rising, becoming well known for his guerrilla combat skills, and even famous in his escape from execution.

Months after the Rising of 1916, working (under an alias) in the shipyards of Dublin, Henry learns about how his amazing escape has made him a modern legend in the pubs of Dublin, by former Easter Rising member, Jack Dalton. Henry, on hearing this news, takes part in the Rebellion once again, and soon discovers how much of his (and his father's) past will come back to haunt him.

Key Plot Points:

- Henry's father was murdered by Alfie Gandon, even after Mr. Smart served him loyally for many years
- Henry & Victor live off the streets at an early age. Although Henry survives, Victor does not, dying of consumption.
- Henry takes part in the Easter Rising, as well as the War of Independence.
- Henry's duties for the IRA have a heavy price: Smart's own head.
- Henry marries, and a daughter is born. However, life on the run forces him to leave his family behind.
- Henry is constantly on the search for any information about his parents, especially the eventual fate of his father.
- Aliases:
  - Henry Smart
  - Fergus Nash
  - Michael Collins
  - Brian O'Linn

== Volume II: Oh, Play That Thing! (2004) ==
In the second novel, Henry is forced to flee Ireland due to the final events that take place in A Star Called Henry. He escapes to Liverpool, the English town with a large Irish influence, and eventually makes his way to America. By March 16, 1924, Henry reaches Ellis Island, and sets up a new life in America.

However, Henry remains haunted by his past. Over the course of the novel, Henry is forced to flee from New York City all the way to Chicago. There, he meets a young man playing the trumpet by the name of Louis Armstrong. Because segregation is all too alive in the city, Armstrong needs a man - a white man - to become his personal guard. Henry's fighting days may not be over . . .

Key Plot Points:

- Henry remains hunted by the IRA, even as he escapes into England, and even America.
- Once in New York, Henry takes up bootlegging as well as sandwich board advertising.
- In Chicago, Henry meets Louis Armstrong, as well as Henry's long lost family.
- Henry & Louis make their way back to New York, and eventually work with "Olaf's Half-Sister"
- Henry is finally caught by those who've always kept an eye out for him, the surviving IRA.
- Henry and family journey into the western Dust bowl, just at the Great Depression begins.
- Henry loses his family (and his leg) after failing to catch a freight train, and searches for them throughout the 1930s and 1940s, following the rumours and campfire tales left in their wake.
- Aliases:
  - Henry Glick (homonymous with glic, Gaeilge for cunning, clever, smart)
  - Henry Dalton (a reference to the deceased Jack Dalton of the IRA)
  - Henry S. (actually Henry S. Smart, his full name, but merely known as this in Chicago)
  - Henry O'Glick (On the run in the West, during the Great Depression)
  - One Leg O'Glick (On his own during his stay in the many Hoovervilles he lived in)

== Volume III: The Dead Republic (2010) ==
In the final volume, an ageing Henry Smart attempts to cement his reputation. John Ford plans a movie based on Henry's life, but Henry eventually realises the film that Ford has planned will reduce his story to sentiment. Henry plans to kill Ford, but his callousness has faded and only gives him a beating, and he drifts into the Dublin suburbs, where he meets a respectable widow who may possibly be his long-disappeared wife. Henry ages in obscurity until the 1970s, when the Provisional IRA uses a distorted version of Henry's story as a public relations ploy.

== Historical appearances ==
Many characters in The Last Roundup are, in fact, historical. Here is a brief list of them:

- James Connolly
- Countess Markievicz
- Michael Collins
- Éamon de Valera
- Louis Armstrong
- Dutch Schultz
- Owney Madden
- Louis Lepke
- John Ford
- Henry Fonda

Also, many events that Henry walks through are historical as well. Another list:

- The Easter Rising, April 24, 1916
- Irish War of Independence, 1919-1922
- Ellis Island Immigration, 1892-1924
- Prohibition, 1920-1933
- The Great Depression, 1929-1939
- The Jazz Age, 1920s-1930s
- The Troubles, 1969-1998
