= Volunteer Political Party =

Loyalist party in Northern Ireland

The Volunteer Political Party (VPP) was a loyalist political party launched in Northern Ireland on 22 June 1974 by members of the then recently legalised Ulster Volunteer Force (UVF). The Chairman was Ken Gibson from East Belfast, an ex-internee and UVF chief of staff at the time. The success of the Ulster Workers Council Strike had shown some UVF leaders the political power they held and they sought to develop this potential further. The UVF had been banned by the Government of Northern Ireland in 1966, but was legalised at the same time as Sinn Féin by Labour Secretary of State Merlyn Rees in April 1974 to encourage a political path for Loyalist and republican paramilitary groups.

It launched its manifesto "The Volunteer Political Party - a progressive and forward thinking unionist party" at a press conference on 27 September. Influenced by the thinking of the Northern Ireland Labour Party, it opposed internment without trial and the idea of independence for Northern Ireland and supported a more equitable distribution of resources to deprived parts of the United Kingdom. The party applied to join the United Ulster Unionist Council (UUUC) but was rebuffed, with the mainstream unionist parties wary of being linked to paramilitaries.

Ken Gibson contested the West Belfast seat, which included parts of the Shankill district, in the October 1974 general election. Despite the security risks, the VPP also carried out some limited canvassing on the Catholic Falls Road. The VPP claimed to stand for the working class and an election pamphlet attacked the disgraceful social conditions on the Shankill. In the election, Gibson was supported by Glen Barr of Vanguard, Charles Harding Smith, the leader of the West Belfast Ulster Defence Association and the independent Shankill councillor Hugh Smyth, who went on to become one of the founders of the Progressive Unionist Party. Standing against the official UUUC candidate, Johnny McQuade of the Democratic Unionist Party (DUP), they won only 2,690 votes (6%), 14% of the total unionist vote.

Because of this failure, the party was dissolved the following month by a meeting of all UVF commanders. A statement announced; "The low poll for the VPP candidate indicates that the general public does not support the political involvement of the UVF. It would therefore be fruitless to promote the Volunteer Party as a party political machine". Most of its members returned to the UVF (some of whom were later to form the Progressive Unionist Party). The UVF turned back to violence and was banned again by the British government on 4 October 1975.

== Sources ==
- Steve Bruce, The Red Hand, 1992, ISBN 0-19-215961-5
- Jim Cusack & Henry McDonald, UVF, 2000, ISBN 1-85371-687-1
- Sarah Nelson, Ulster's Uncertain Defenders, 1984, ISBN 0-904651-99-1
- Tim Pat Coogan, The Troubles: Ireland's Ordeal, 1966-1996, and the Search for Peace. ISBN 0-09-179146-4. Hutchinson, 1995.
- Frenett, Ross. "‘Protestant Socialists’? Ulster Loyalism and Working-Class Politics:1969-1974," Scrinium, University College Cork (2010). https://www.academia.edu/24559678/_Protestant_Socialists_Ulster_Loyalism_and_Working-class_Politics_1969-1974/
