= Dublin and Monaghan bombings =

1974 terrorist bombings in Ireland

- Part of the Troubles
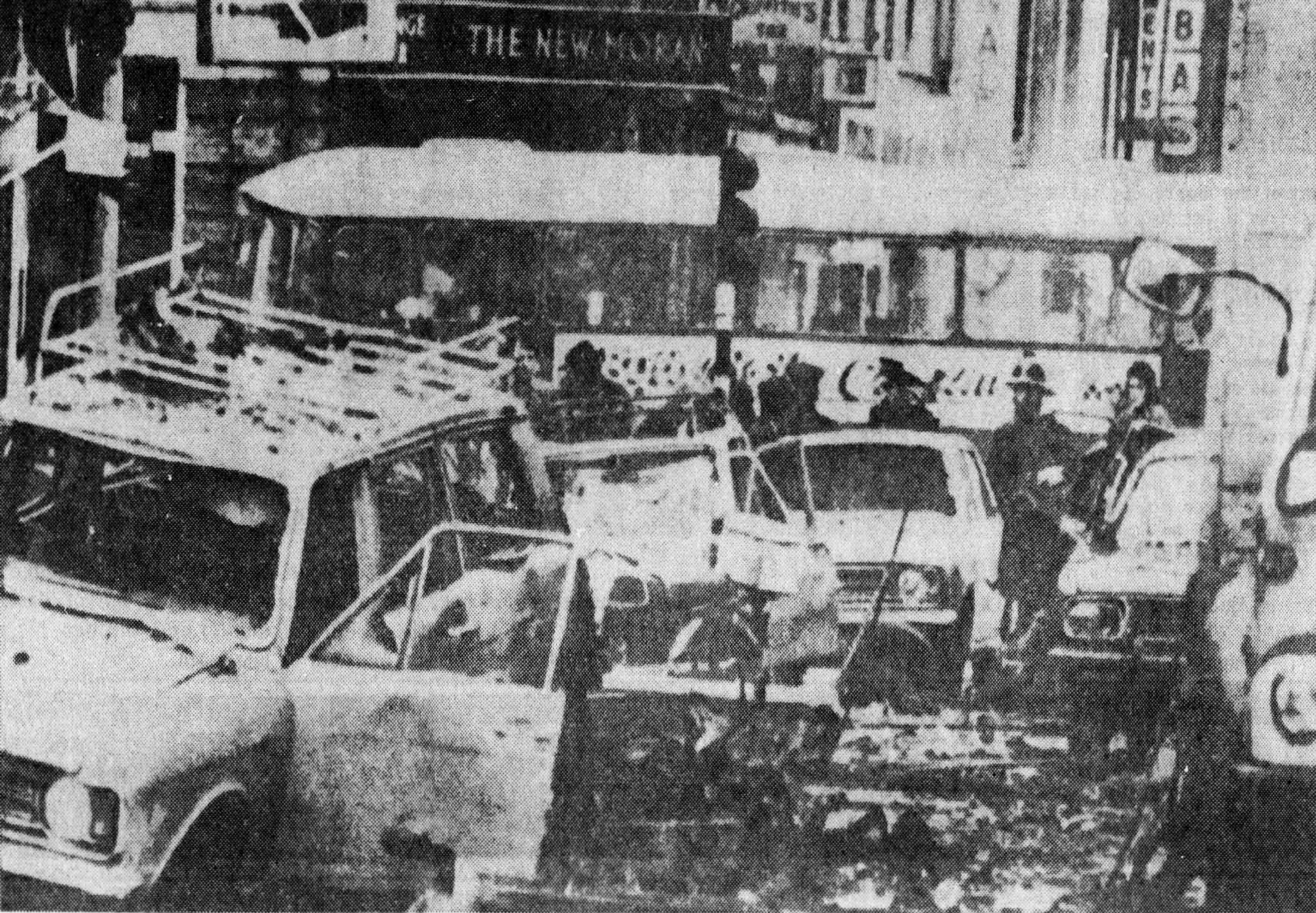
- Fireman and police walk through the aftermath of the bombing on Talbot Street
- Location: Dublin and Monaghan, Ireland
- Date: 17 May 1974; 52 years ago 5:28 p.m. - 6:58 p.m. IST (UTC+01:00)
- Attack type: Car bombings
- Weapon: ANFO car bombs
- Deaths: 33 (26 in Dublin, 7 in Monaghan)
- Injuries: c. 300
- Perpetrator: Ulster Volunteer Force

Map of central Dublin showing the three bomb sites

A series of co-ordinated bombings were carried out in Dublin and Monaghan, Ireland, by the Ulster Volunteer Force (UVF) on 17 May 1974. Three car bombs exploded in Dublin during the evening rush hour and a fourth exploded in Monaghan almost ninety minutes later. They killed 34 civilians, 32 in the original attack and 2 in the weeks following the Monaghan bombing. Almost 300 people were injured. Together, the bombings were the deadliest attack of the conflict known as the Troubles (although the deadliest single incident would be the Omagh bombing in 1998), and the deadliest attack in the Republic's history. Most of the victims were young women, although the ages of the dead ranged from 4½ months up to 80 years.

The UVF, a loyalist paramilitary group from Northern Ireland, claimed responsibility for the bombings in 1993. It had launched a number of attacks in the Republic since 1969. The month before the bombings, the British government had lifted the UVF's status as a proscribed organisation. The bombings happened during the Ulster Workers' Council strike; a general strike called by loyalists and unionists in Northern Ireland who opposed the Sunningdale Agreement. Specifically, they opposed the sharing of political power with Irish nationalists, and the proposed role of the Republic in the governance of Northern Ireland. The Republic's government had helped bring about the Agreement. The strike brought down the Agreement and the Northern Ireland Assembly on 28 May.

No one has ever been charged with the bombings. A campaign by the victims' families led to an Irish government inquiry under Mr. Justice Henry Barron. His 2003 report criticised the Garda Síochána's investigation and said the investigators stopped their work prematurely. It also criticised the Fine Gael/Labour government of the time for its inaction and lack of interest in the bombings. The report said it was likely that British military personnel helped the UVF carry out the bombings, including members of the Glenanne gang. The Irish parliament's Joint Committee on Justice called the attacks an act of international terrorism involving British state forces. However, the inquiry was hindered by the British government's refusal to release key documents. The victims' families and others continue to campaign for the British government to release these documents.

== Explosions ==
=== Dublin ===
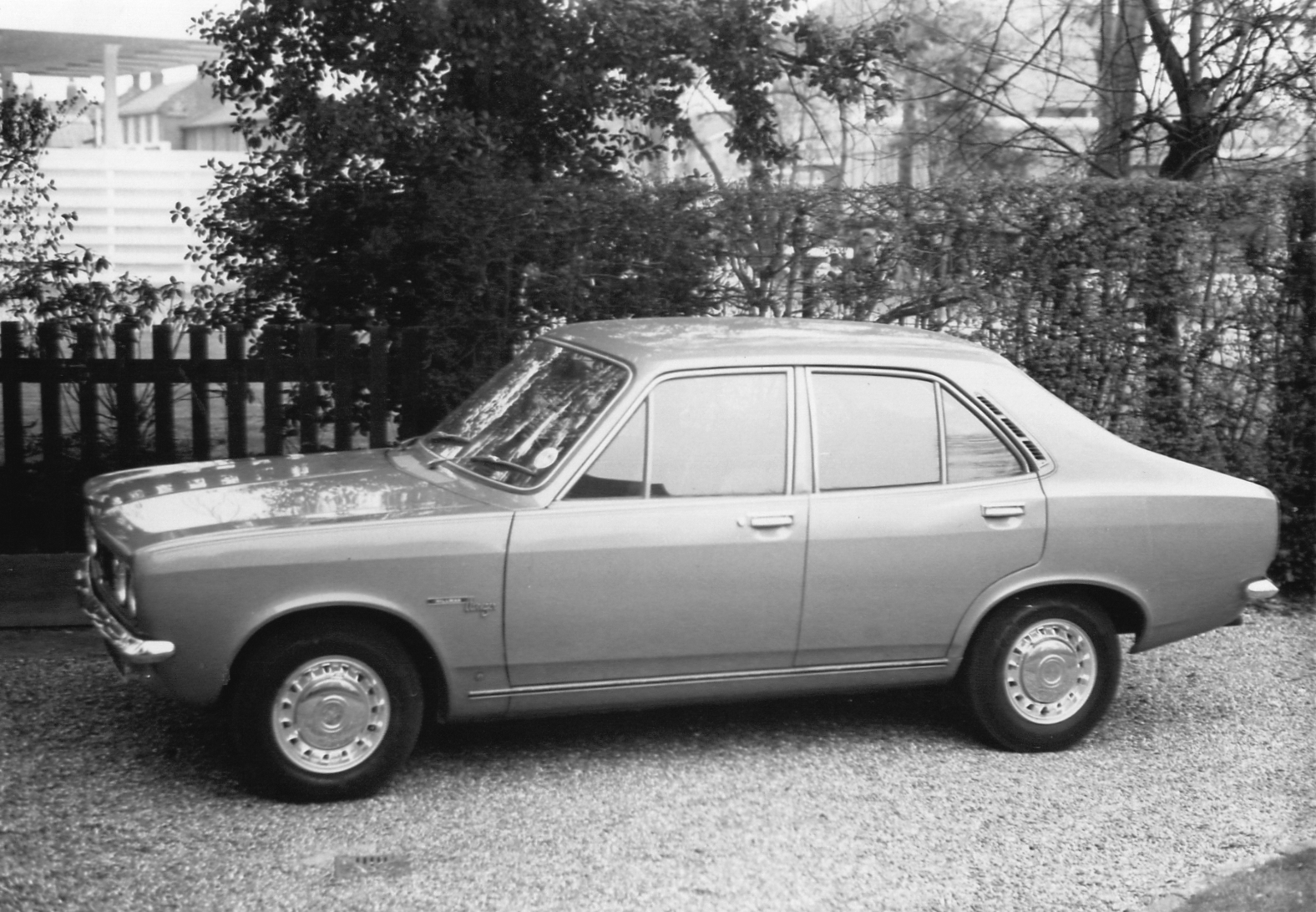
A hijacked green 1970 Hillman Avenger was used in the Parnell Street explosion which killed 10 people

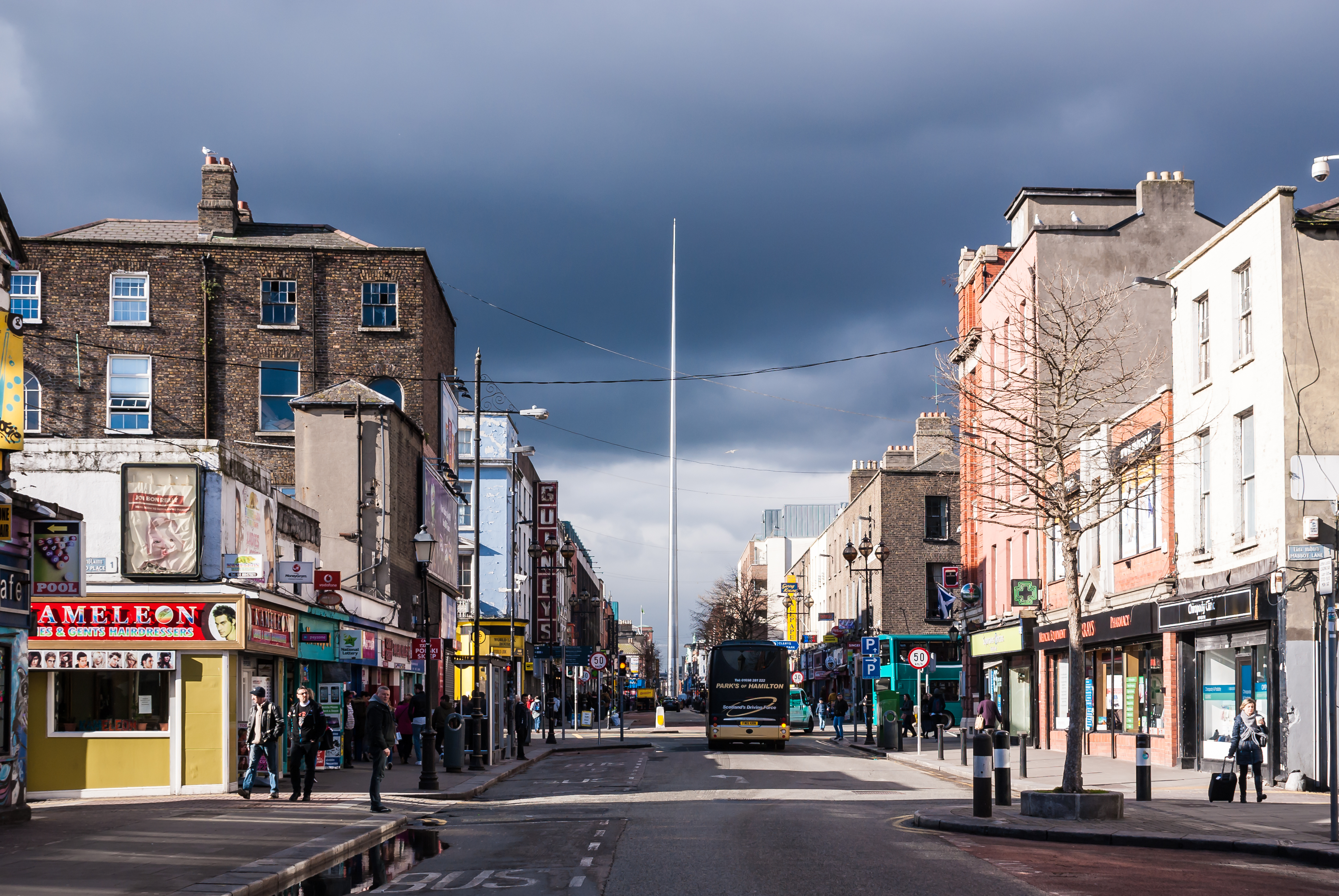
A 2017 view of Talbot Street where a further 14 people died

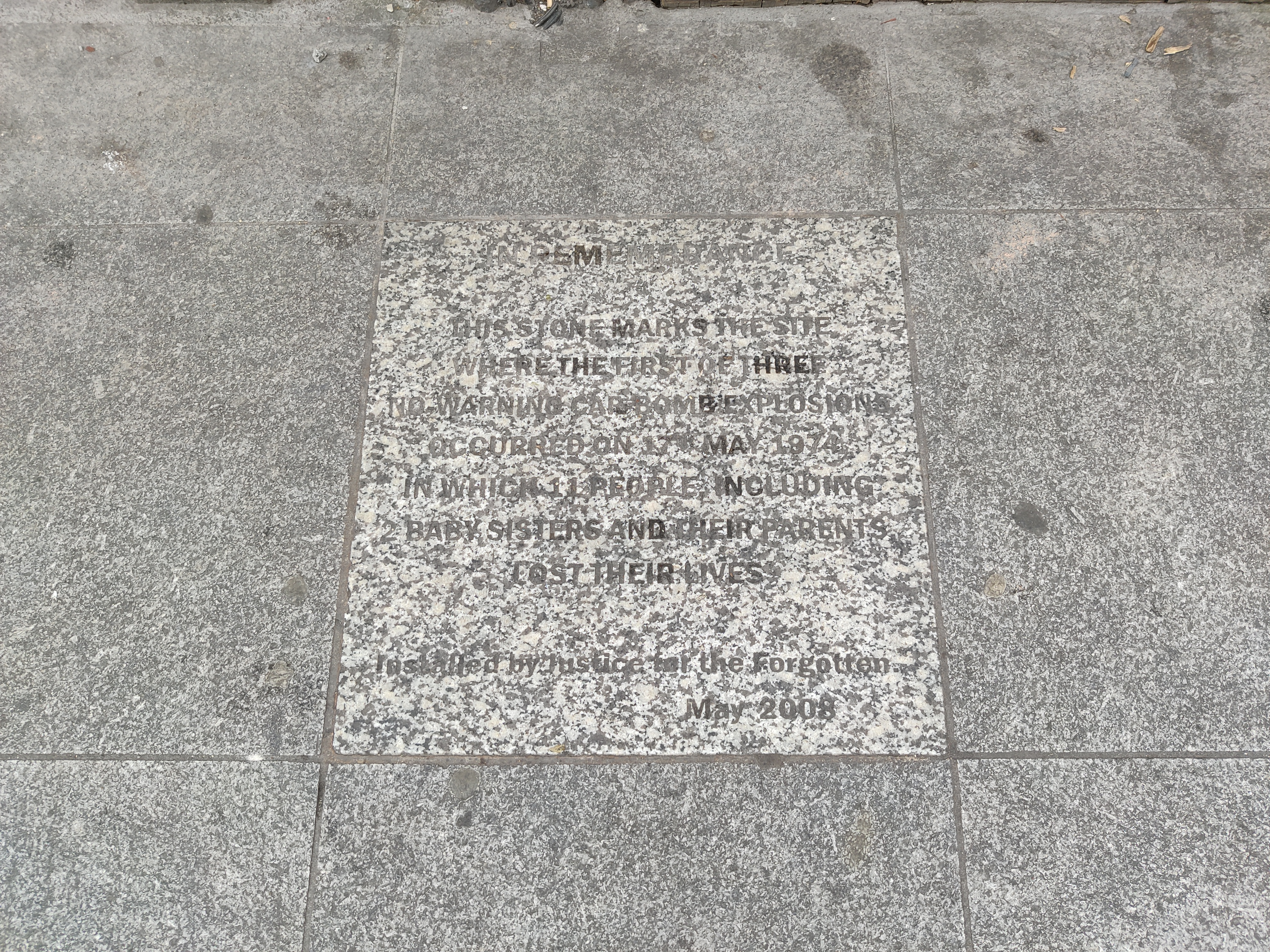
Memorial on Parnell Street

At about 17:30 on Friday 17 May 1974, without warning, three car bombs exploded in Dublin city centre at Parnell Street, Talbot Street and South Leinster Street during rush hour. The streets all ran east-west from busy thoroughfares to railway stations. There was a bus strike in Dublin at the time, which meant there were more people on the streets than usual. According to one of the Irish Army's top bomb disposal officers, Commandant Patrick Trears, the bombs were constructed so well that 100% of each bomb exploded upon detonation.

27 people died in the explosions in Dublin. Many of the dead were young women originally from rural towns employed in the civil service. An entire family (parents and their two children) from central Dublin was killed. Two of the victims were foreign: Antonio Magliocco, an Italian man, and Simone Chetrit, a French Jewish woman whose family had survived the Holocaust.

==== First bomb ====
The first of the three Dublin car bombs went off at about 17:28 on Parnell Street, near the intersection with Marlborough Street. It was in a parking bay outside the Welcome Inn pub and Barry's supermarket at 93 and 91 Parnell Street respectively, and near petrol pumps. Shop fronts were blown out, cars were destroyed, and people were thrown in all directions. A brown Mini that had been parked behind the bomb was hurled onto the pavement at a right angle. One survivor described "a big ball of flame coming straight towards us, like a great nuclear mushroom cloud whooshing up everything in its path". The bomb car was a metallic green 1970 Hillman Avenger, registration number DIA 4063. It had been facing toward O'Connell Street, Dublin's main thoroughfare. This car, like the other two bomb cars, had its original registration plates. It had been hijacked in Belfast that morning.

Ten people were killed in this explosion, including two infant girls and their parents, and a World War I veteran. Many others, including a teenage petrol-pump attendant, were severely injured.

==== Second bomb ====
The second of the Dublin car bombs went off at about 17:30 on Talbot Street, near the intersection with Lower Gardiner Street. Talbot Street was the main route from the city centre to Connolly station, one of Dublin's primary railway stations. It was parked at 18 Talbot Street, on the north side, opposite Guineys department store. The bomb car was a metallic blue mink Ford Escort, registration number 1385 WZ. It had been stolen that morning in the Docks area of Belfast. The blast damaged buildings and vehicles on both sides of the street. People suffered severe burns and were struck by shrapnel, flying glass and debris; some were hurled through the windows of shops.

Twelve people were killed outright, and another two died over the following days and weeks. Thirteen of the fourteen victims were women, including one who was nine months pregnant. One young woman who had been beside the bomb car was decapitated. Several others lost limbs and a man was impaled through the abdomen by an iron bar. Several bodies lay in the street for half an hour as ambulances struggled to get through traffic jams. At least four bodies were found on the pavement outside Guiney's. The bodies of the victims were covered by newspapers until they were removed from the scene.

==== Third bomb ====
The third bomb went off at about 17:32 at the intersection of Nassau Street and South Leinster Street, near the railings of Trinity College and not far from Leinster House, the seat of the Oireachtas. Two women were killed outright. They had been very close to the epicentre of the blast. The bomb car was a blue Austin 1800 with registration number HOI 2487; like the Parnell Street car, it had been hijacked in Belfast that same morning from a taxi company. Dental students from Trinity College rushed to the scene to give first aid to the injured.

=== Monaghan ===
Almost ninety minutes later, at about 18:58, a fourth car bomb (weighing 68 kilograms (150 lb)) exploded in the centre of Monaghan town, just south of the border with Northern Ireland. It had been parked outside Protestant-owned Greacen's pub on North Road. The car was a green 1966 Hillman Minx, registration number 6583 OZ; it had been stolen from a Portadown car park several hours before. As in Dublin, no warning had been given. This bomb killed five people outright, and another two died in the following weeks. There is evidence that the car bomb was parked five minutes before the explosion. The bomb site, which was about 270–370 metres (890–1,210 ft) from the Garda station, was preserved by a roster of eight Gardaí from 19:00 on 17 May until 14:30 on 19 May, at which time the technical examination of the area had been completed. Forensic analysis of the metal fragments taken from the site suggested that the bomb had been in a beer barrel or similar container. It has been suggested that the Monaghan bombing was a "supporting attack"; a diversion to draw security away from the border and thus help the Dublin bombers return to Northern Ireland.

== Aftermath ==
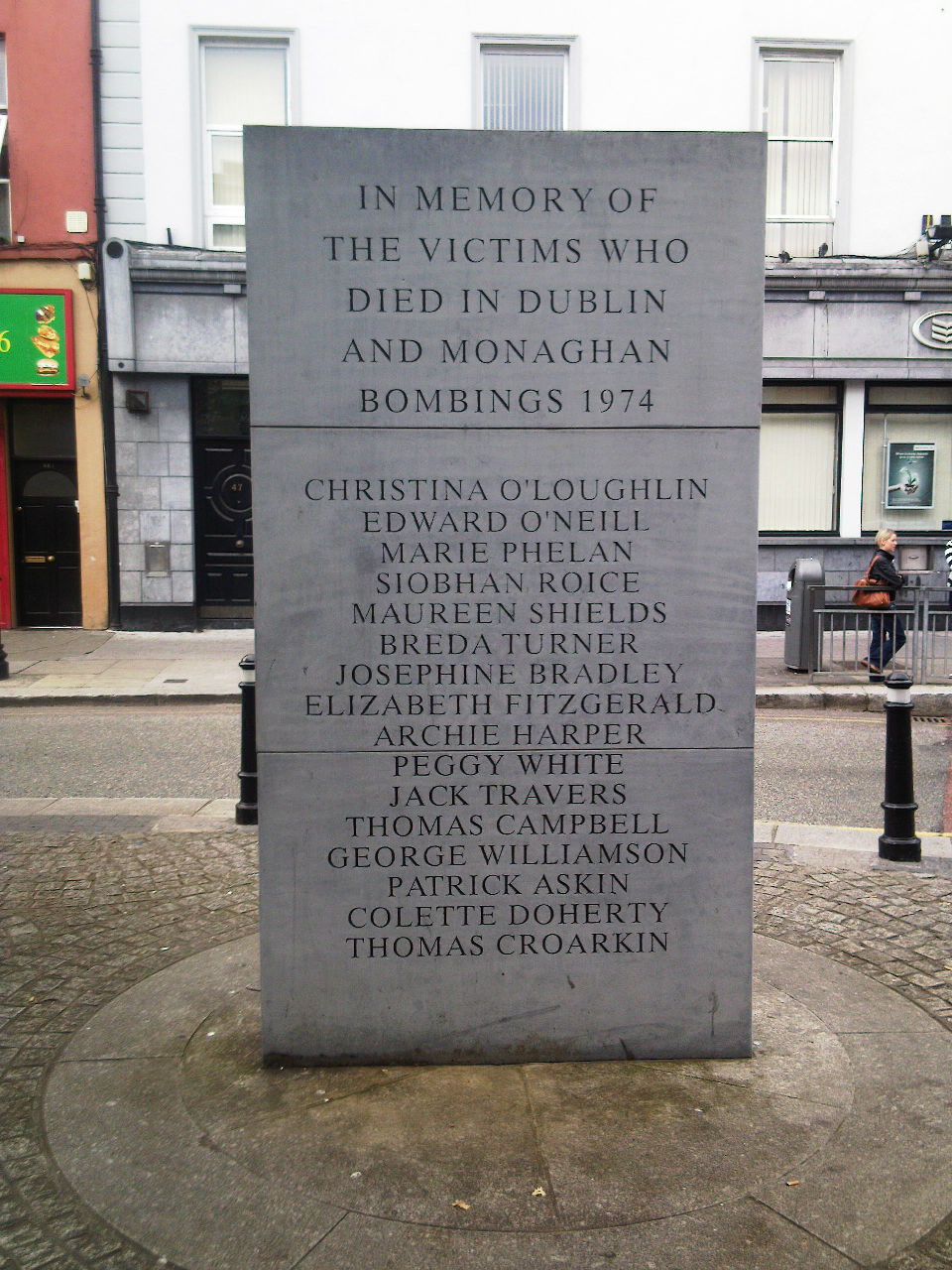
Memorial to the bomb victims in Dublin's Talbot Street

After the blasts, bystanders rushed to help the wounded, and emergency response personnel were on the scene within minutes. Hospitals across Dublin were put on standby to receive casualties. However, rescue operations in Dublin were hampered by heavy traffic due to the bus strike. Rescuers, feeling that help was not coming fast enough, lifted the dead and wounded, wrapped them in coats and bundled them into cars to get them to the nearest hospital. Garda Síochána squad cars escorted surgeons through the crowded streets to attend to the wounded. Many people, on finding out what had happened, went straight away to offer blood.

Paddy Doyle of Finglas, who lost his daughter, son-in-law, and two infant granddaughters in the Parnell Street explosion, described the scene inside Dublin's city morgue as having been like a "slaughterhouse", with workers "putting arms and legs together to make up a body".

At 18:00, after all of the dead and injured had been removed, Garda officers cordoned off the three bomb sites in Dublin. Fifteen minutes earlier, at 17:45, the orders were given to call out 'national cordons', to stop the bombers fleeing the state. Garda officers were sent to Connolly Station, Busáras, Dublin Airport, the B&I car ferry port, and the mail boat at Dún Laoghaire. At 18:28, the Dublin-Belfast train was stopped at Dundalk and searched by a team of 18 Gardaí led by an inspector. During the evening of 17 May, Gardaí from the Ballistics, Photography, Mappings, and Fingerprints section visited the three bomb sites in Dublin and examined the debris.

Some accounts give a total of 34 or 35 dead from the four bombings: 34 by including the unborn child of victim Colette Doherty, who was nine months pregnant; and 35 by including the later still-born child of Edward and Martha O'Neill. Edward was killed outright in Parnell Street. Martha O'Neill was not caught up in the attack, although two of their children were seriously injured in the bombing; one of them, a four-year-old boy, suffered severe facial injuries. The 22-month-old daughter of Colette Doherty survived the Talbot Street blast; she was found wandering about near the bomb site, relatively unharmed. Six weeks after the bombings, the elderly mother of Thomas Campbell, who was killed in the Monaghan bombing, allegedly died of the shock she received at the death of her son.

Due to the bombings, the Irish Army withdrew its troops from UN peacekeeping missions for four years.

== Reactions ==
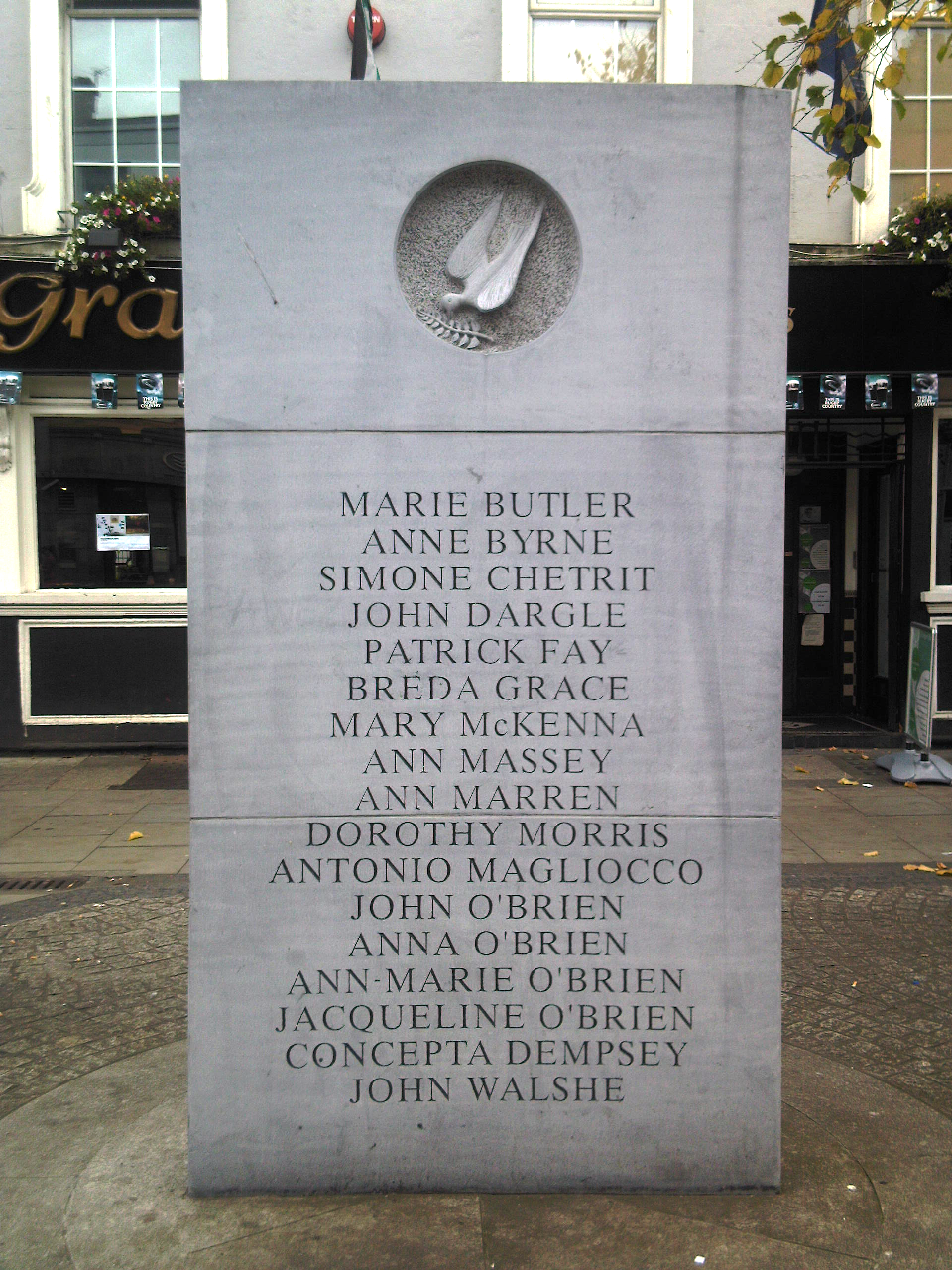
Reverse of Talbot Street memorial

British Prime Minister Harold Wilson described the attacks as "horrific", and said, "Once again it is the defenceless civilian population who suffer the consequences of these mindless and savage terrorist attacks".

Brian Faulkner, the Chief Executive of Northern Ireland and former leader of the Ulster Unionist Party, sent to a message to Taoiseach Liam Cosgrave in Dublin, saying:

We in Northern Ireland, who have had to endure so much suffering and death in recent years, can appreciate fully the tragedy of those who have been struck down and the grief of those who have been bereaved in injured in your capital...

Whatever the differences of opinion which may exist in other matters, I believe the responsible people in Northern Ireland and Éire alike want to see this island rid forever of the evil forces which are guilty of such acts.

In Leinster House, about 300 metres from the site of the South Leinster Street blast, political leaders spoke about the bombings at the next session of Dáil Éireann. Statements by government ministers appeared to suggest that the bombings were an inevitable result of the IRA and Loyalist paramilitary campaigns in the UK. Taoiseach Liam Cosgrave, of Fine Gael, recorded his disgust and added:

The blood of the innocent victims of last Friday's outrage—and of the victims of similar outrages in the North and in England—is on the hands of every man who has fired a gun or discharged a bomb in furtherance of the present campaign of violence in these islands—just as plainly as it is on the hands of those who parked the cars and set the charges last Friday. In our times, violence cannot be contained in neat compartments and justified in one case but not in another.

The opposition leader Jack Lynch, of Fianna Fáil, was "sickened" by the "cruel" events, and also widened the question of blame:

Every person and every organisation which played any part in the campaign of bombing and violence which killed and maimed people and destroyed property in Belfast, Derry or any other part of our country and indeed in Britain over the past five years, shares the guilt and the shame of the assassins who actually placed these bombs on the streets of Dublin and Monaghan last Friday.

In secret memos, Arthur Galsworthy, British Ambassador to the Republic of Ireland, noted the reactions in Dublin immediately after the bombings. He reported that Minister for Foreign Affairs Garret FitzGerald told him that "the government's view was that popular hostility appeared to be directed more against the IRA", and that

There is no sign of any general anti-Northern Protestant reaction ... The predictable attempt by the IRA to pin the blame on the British (British agents, the SAS, etc) has made no headway at all. ... It is only now that the South has experienced violence that they are reacting in the way that the North has sought for so long. ... it would be ... a psychological mistake for us to rub this point in. ... I think the Irish have taken the point.

In Northern Ireland, Sammy Smyth, then press officer of both the Ulster Defence Association (UDA) and the Ulster Workers' Council (UWC) Strike Committee, said, "I am very happy about the bombings in Dublin. There is a war with the Free State and now we are laughing at them." However, neither the UDA nor UVF admitted responsibility. A 'Captain Craig' telephoned the Irish News and Irish Times, claiming responsibility for the bombings on behalf of the 'Red Hand Brigade', which is believed to be a cover name. Richard Eder at The New York Times reported on 19 May 1974 at the scene two days after the bombing:

The tendency here not to think about the problems of the North and the consequent lack of any strong public pressure to take action against the gunmen operating from the republic's territory comes from something more complex than complacency.

Partly it was the residual sympathy for the tradition of violent action to obtain a united Ireland. Partly it was the pessimistic conclusion that only a final armed showdown between northern Protestants and Roman Catholics would solve the problem, and the natural tendency to think as little as possible about such a terrifying and dangerous prospect.

The following day, Eder reported the bombing was carried out by loyalist paramilitaries who "wanted to give this predominantly Roman Catholic country a taste of the kind of violence served on the North by the Provisional wing of the IRA." Official Unionist MP John Laird claimed that the "people who are suffering [in Dublin] are people who have quietly condoned a terrorist campaign [in Northern Ireland and Great Britain]." After the 1972 and 1973 Dublin bombings, Unionist MP John Taylor asserted that the loyalist bombings in border areas were "an advantage to Northern Ireland security"

The Irish government vowed to pursue those responsible. However, there have been complaints from the victims' families and others about the Irish government's reaction. The Fine Gael–Labour Party government refused to hold a national day of mourning, because, according to a spokesman from the Government Information Bureau, "More than 1,000 people have now died in the current Troubles". The previous government had held a national day of mourning for those killed in the Bloody Sunday shootings in Northern Ireland. A decision was also made not to fly the national flag at half-mast, but this was quickly reversed.

== Responsibility for the bombings ==
The Ulster Volunteer Force (UVF) claimed responsibility for the bombings in 1993, following a TV documentary on the bombings that named the UVF as the perpetrators, and which alleged that elements of British security forces were involved in the attack.

=== Hidden Hand: The Forgotten Massacre ===
On 7 July 1993, Yorkshire Television broadcast a documentary about the bombings, named Hidden Hand: The Forgotten Massacre. The documentary-makers interviewed former Irish and British security force personnel, as well as former loyalist militants. They were also given access to Garda documents.

The programme claimed the bombings were carried out by the UVF, with help from members of the British security forces. It named a number of UVF members who it said were involved, and who had since been killed in the Troubles. These included Billy Hanna (a sergeant in the British Army's Ulster Defence Regiment – UDR), Robert McConnell (a UDR corporal), Harris Boyle (also a UDR soldier), and a loyalist referred to as "the Jackal". He was later identified as former UDR soldier Robin Jackson, who was still alive at the time of broadcast. The documentary claimed that all of these men were working as agents for the British Intelligence Corps and RUC Special Branch. William Marchant was named as leader of the Belfast UVF gang who hijacked the cars used. The documentary also suggested that British Army officer Robert Nairac, a member of the covert Special Reconnaissance Unit/14 Intelligence Company, may have been involved. The narrator said: "We have evidence from police, military and loyalist sources which confirms [...] that in May 1974, he was meeting with these terrorists, supplying them with arms and helping them plan acts of terrorism".

Reference was made to the complexity of the attack and the sophistication of the bombs. Former British Army officer Fred Holroyd, former Garda Commissioner Eamon Doherty, and retired bomb disposal experts Lieutenant Colonel George Styles (British Army) and Commandant Patrick Trears (Irish Army) all suggested the bombs were not characteristic of the UVF and that it could not have mounted the attack without help from the security forces.

It was suggested that elements of the British security forces were using loyalist terrorists as proxies. It was said that a significant element within the security forces favoured a military solution to the conflict, and opposed a political solution, which was being pursued by the UK's Labour government. Merlyn Rees, the British government's Northern Ireland Secretary, believed that his policies in pursuit of peace in 1974 had been undermined by a faction in British Army Intelligence. The inference was that the bombings were intended to wreck the Sunningdale Agreement and to make both governments take a stronger line against the IRA.

=== UVF claims responsibility ===
One week later on 15 July 1993, the UVF confirmed responsibility for the bombings, but also denied that it was aided by British security forces.

The UVF claimed that:

The entire operation was from its conception to its successful conclusion, planned and carried out by our volunteers aided by no outside bodies. In contrast to the scenario painted by the programme, it would have been unnecessary and indeed undesirable to compromise our volunteers anonimity [sic] by using clandestine Security Force personnel, British or otherwise, to achieve [an] objective well within our capabilities. ... Given the backdrop of what was taking place in Northern Ireland when the UVF [were] bombing republican targets at will, either the researchers decided to take poetic licence to the limit or the truth was being twisted by knaves to make [a] trap for the fools. ... The minimum of scrutiny should have revealed that the structure of the bombs placed in Dublin and Monaghan were similar if not identical to those being placed in Northern Ireland on an almost daily basis. The type of explosives, timing and detonating methods all bore the hallmark of the UVF. It is incredulous [sic] that these points were lost on the Walter Mittys who conjured up this programme. To suggest that the UVF were not, or are not, capable of operating in the manner outlined in the programme is tempting fate to a dangerous degree.

=== Campaign by victims' families ===
In 1996, relatives of the victims of the bombings (known as Justice for the Forgotten) launched a campaign for a public inquiry. The group believed that they had been forgotten by the Irish state and that British forces may have been involved in the bombings.

On 23 July 1997, the group lobbied the European Parliament. MEPs from many countries supported a call for the British government to release its files relating to the bombings. On 27 August that year, however, a court in the Republic declined to request the release of the files.

In August 1999, Irish Victims Commissioner, John Wilson, reported on the demand for a public inquiry. He proposed a judicial inquiry, held in private. In December 1999, Taoiseach Bertie Ahern appointed Mr Justice Liam Hamilton to undertake an inquiry into the bombings. The inquiry began work early in 2000 and in October Mr Justice Henry Barron was appointed to succeed Mr Justice Hamilton. The Irish Government and others reported that the British Government were slow to co-operate with the inquiry. It wrote to the British Secretary of State for Northern Ireland, John Reid, in November 2000. He replied in February 2002, saying that British documents on the bombings would not be made available due to national security concerns. The Barron Report was published in December 2003. The report said it was likely that British security force personnel were involved in the bombings but had insufficient evidence of higher-level involvement. However, the inquiry reported that it was hindered by the British Government's refusal to release key documents. (For details on the Barron Report's findings, see below.)

An Irish government sub-committee was then established to consider the Barron Report and make recommendations. These recommendations (which are outlined below) were published in March 2004. It recommended the Irish Government bring a case before the European Court of Human Rights to force the British Government to hold a public inquiry into the bombings. In June 2005, the Irish Government said it would consider bringing the British Government to the European Court of Justice, to force the release of the files on the bombings.

Two motions were passed unanimously by Dáil Éireann in 2008 and 2011, urging the British Government to make the documents available to an independent, international judicial figure for assessment. In 2012 and 2013, Justice for the Forgotten met with the British Ambassador to the Republic of Ireland and proposed the documents be assessed in Britain by an agreed assessor. However, a further meeting to move the process forward was cancelled by the British side in November 2013.

In May 2014, the victims' families announced that they were taking a civil action against British government agencies including the British Ministry of Defence, the Northern Ireland Office and the Police Service of Northern Ireland.

== Barron Report ==
=== Main findings ===
On 10 December 2003, Mr Justice Henry Barron's report on the Dublin and Monaghan bombings was published. The publication of the report caused a sensation in Ireland, as shown by the political and media reaction. It is generally agreed that the report raised more questions than it answered and that it opened up new avenues of inquiry.

Regarding the circumstances and perpetrators of the bombings, it said the following:

- The bombings were carried out by two groups of loyalist paramilitaries, one based in Belfast and the other in the Portadown/Lurgan area. Most, though not all of those involved were members of the UVF.
- The bombings were a reaction to the Sunningdale Agreement – in particular to the prospect of a role for the Irish government in the administration of Northern Ireland.
- It is likely that UDR soldiers and RUC officers helped prepare the attack, or were aware of the preparations. It is also likely that the farm of RUC officer James Mitchell at Glenanne played a big part in the preparations. Based on the material available, there is insufficient evidence that senior security force personnel were involved. However, it is possible that UDR/RUC involvement was covered up at a higher level.
- There is no evidence that any branch of the security forces knew of the bombings beforehand. If they did know, it is unlikely there would be any official records.
- The Inquiry believes that within a short time of the bombings, the security forces in Northern Ireland had good intelligence to suggest who was responsible. Furthermore, some of the suspects were reliably said to have had relationships with British Intelligence and RUC Special Branch officers.

The Inquiry said it was obstructed by the British authorities in investigating collusion and faced the same problems as the Stevens Inquiry. The British government refused to show the Inquiry intelligence documents, and the Inquiry said this hindered its investigation.

=== Criticism of the Gardaí and Irish government ===
The Barron Report criticised the Garda investigation into the bombings, and the reaction of the Fine Gael/Labour government of the time.

The Report said that the Garda investigation failed to make full use of the information it had. For example, when the RUC told the Gardaí it had arrested some of the suspected bombers, the Gardaí apparently did not ask their names nor what information led to their arrest. It also revealed that there is a great deal of official Garda documentation that is missing. Barron said that Department of Justice files on the Dublin bombings were "missing in their entirety" and that the Department did not give any records to the Inquiry. The Report concluded that the Garda investigation team stopped their work before they should have. The specially-appointed investigation team was disbanded in July 1974, two months after the bombings.

Barron's report noted that the Fine Gael/Labour government of the time "showed little interest in the bombings" and did not do enough to help the investigation. "When information was given to them suggesting that the British authorities had intelligence naming the bombers, this was not followed up". It failed to put political pressure on the British government to secure better co-operation from the RUC. It was also alleged that the Fine Gael/Labour government caused or allowed the Garda investigation to end prematurely, for fear that the findings would play into the hands of republicans. However, the Inquiry had insufficient evidence the investigation was stopped as a result of political interference.

=== Sub-Committee recommendations ===
Following the release of the Barron Report, an Oireachtas Sub-Committee was established to consider the Report and make recommendations. These recommendations were published in March 2004 as a 'Final Report'.

The Sub-Committee concluded there should be further and extensive investigation into the culprits and claims that British forces colluded with the bombers. It said the information it received has reinforced the suspicion that there was collusion. However, it noted that to investigate this, access to documentation and witnesses in the UK is vital.

Because the documentation and suspects are in the UK, the Sub-Committee said there should be a Public Tribunal of Inquiry in Northern Ireland and/or Britain. It recommended the Irish Government bring a case before the European Court of Human Rights to force the British Government to hold such an inquiry into the bombings. In 2005, the Irish Government threatened to bring the British government to the European Court of Justice, to force it to release its files on the bombings. British Prime Minister Tony Blair said there was not enough evidence to justify a public inquiry.

Following a recommendation from the Sub-Committee, the Irish Government established a further commission of investigation in May 2005 under Patrick McEntee. The 'McEntee Inquiry' was tasked to investigate why the Garda investigation was wound down, why the Garda did not follow-up on some leads, and the missing Garda documents. The report was handed to the Irish government in March 2007 and published shortly thereafter.

Subsequent reports by Henry Barron into the Miami Showband massacre, the killing of Seamus Ludlow, and the bombing of Keys Tavern found evidence of extensive collusion with the same UVF members, amounting to "international terrorism" on the part of British forces.

== Allegations of British Government involvement ==
=== Colin Wallace's claims ===
At the time of the bombings, Colin Wallace was a British Intelligence Corps officer at the British Army's Northern Ireland headquarters. Since his resignation in 1975, he has exposed scandals involving the security forces, including state collusion with loyalists. He gave evidence to the Barron Inquiry.

In an August 1975 letter to Tony Stoughton, chief of the British Army Information Service in Northern Ireland, Wallace writes:

There is good evidence the Dublin bombings in May last year were a reprisal for the Irish government's role in bringing about the [power sharing] Executive. According to one of Craig's people [Craig Smellie, the top MI6 officer in Northern Ireland], some of those involved – the Youngs, the Jacksons, Mulholland, Hanna, Kerr and McConnell – were working closely with [Special Branch] and [Military Intelligence] at that time. Craig's people believe the sectarian assassinations were designed to destroy Rees's attempts to negotiate a ceasefire, and the targets were identified for both sides by [Intelligence/Special Branch]. They also believe some very senior RUC officers were involved with this group. In short, it would appear that loyalist paramilitaries and [Intelligence/Special Branch] members have formed some sort of pseudo gangs in an attempt to fight a war of attrition by getting paramilitaries on both sides to kill each other and, at the same time prevent any future political initiative such as Sunningdale.

In a further letter of September 1975, Wallace wrote that MI5 was backing a group of UVF hardliners who opposed the UVF's move toward politics. He added:

I believe much of the violence generated during the latter part of last year was caused by some of the new [Intelligence] people deliberately stirring up the conflict. As you know, we have never been allowed to target the breakaway UVF, nor the UFF, during the past year. Yet they have killed more people than the IRA!

In his evidence to the Barron Inquiry, Wallace argued that the security forces had so thoroughly infiltrated the UVF that they would have known such a huge bombing operation was being planned and who was involved. He then noted that the bombing investigation team was disbanded a very short time after the bombings. Barron noted that Wallace's August 1975 letter was "strong evidence that the security forces in Northern Ireland had intelligence information which was not shared with the Garda investigation team."

As with Fred Holroyd and John Weir, there were unsuccessful attempts to undermine Colin Wallace. Barron noted that Wallace was targeted by the same security services he had served. He was forced to resign in 1975, ostensibly for trying to pass a classified document to journalist Robert Fisk. Wallace claims the real reasons for his dismissal were his refusal to continue working on the Clockwork Orange project, and his discovery that the security forces were involved in a child sex abuse ring. After his dismissal, Wallace attempted to expose these scandals, as well as state collusion with loyalists. In 1980, shortly after making some of his allegations, he was arrested and convicted of manslaughter. He was released on parole in 1985 and proclaimed his innocence. Various people have alleged that Wallace was framed. He later had his conviction overturned and was paid £30,000 compensation for unjust dismissal from government service. His role within the British Army intelligence service had been officially, albeit belatedly, acknowledged in 1990.

=== John Weir's claims ===
John Weir was an officer in the RUC's Special Patrol Group during the 1970s. In 1980, he and fellow RUC officer Billy McCaughey were convicted of taking part in the murder of a Catholic civilian. Following their convictions, they implicated fellow RUC officers and UDR soldiers in a string of loyalist attacks. In a sworn affidavit, Weir revealed that he had been part of the 'Glenanne gang' – a secret alliance of UVF members and security force personnel who carried out numerous attacks on the Irish Catholic and Irish nationalist community in the 1970s. Most of its attacks took place in the area of County Armagh and Tyrone referred to as the "murder triangle", but it also launched some attacks in the Republic. According to Weir, this included the Dublin-Monaghan bombings. He named people who he said were involved in a number of these attacks. He also named a farm in Glenanne, owned by RUC officer James Mitchell, which he claimed was used as a base of operations by the group. Furthermore, he alleged that senior RUC officers knew of, and gave tacit approval to, these activities.

According to Weir, the main organiser of the Dublin-Monaghan bombings was Billy Hanna. He claimed that Hanna, Robin Jackson, Davy Payne and William Marchant carried out the Dublin bombings, while Stewart Young and brothers John and Wesley Somerville (both UDR soldiers) carried out the Monaghan bombing. He claimed the explosives had been provided by Captain John Irwin, a UDR Intelligence Officer, and that the bombs had been assembled at the Glenanne farm of James Mitchell, with help from fellow RUC officer Laurence McClure. Weir claims British Army Intelligence and the RUC knew who the culprits were but did not arrest them. Furthermore, he says it is likely that Army Intelligence/RUC knew about the bombings beforehand, due to its contacts with the Glenanne group.

The RUC furnished the Gardaí with a report that attempted to undermine Weir's evidence. Barron found this RUC report to be highly inaccurate and lacking credibility. The Barron Inquiry believes that Weir's evidence is credible, and "agrees with the view of An Garda Síochána that Weir's allegations regarding the Dublin and Monaghan bombings must be treated with the utmost seriousness". The Barron Inquiry found evidence to support Weir's claims. This included a chain of ballistics history linking the same weapons to many of the attacks Weir outlined. Journalist Susan McKay noted that "The same individuals turn up again and again, but the links weren't noted. Some of the perpetrators weren't prosecuted despite evidence against them".

=== Fred Holroyd's claims ===
Evidence for British security force involvement in the bombings is also supported by British Army Captain Fred Holroyd, who worked for MI6 during the 1970s in Northern Ireland. Holroyd said that "the bombings were part of a pattern of collusion between elements of the security forces in Northern Ireland and loyalist paramilitaries". He claimed that the main organiser of the bombings, Hanna, had contact with an intelligence officer who reported to Holroyd.

Holroyd also claimed that elements of the Irish security forces secretly agreed to 'freeze' border areas for British forces. This meant Irish forces would leave an area for a given amount of time, primarily so that British forces could cross the border to kidnap IRA members. Holroyd claimed the Assistant Garda Commissioner, Edmund Garvey, met him and an RUC officer at Garda headquarters in 1975. Holroyd named Garvey and another Garda (codenamed 'the badger') as being on the "British side". Garvey later denied that the meeting took place. However, Barron found: "The visit by Holroyd to Garda Headquarters unquestionably did take place, notwithstanding former Commissioner Garvey's inability to recall it". Garvey was dismissed by the incoming Fianna Fáil Government in 1978, who simply stated it no longer had confidence in him as Garda Commissioner.

The Barron Inquiry found that members of the Gardaí and RUC attempted to unfairly and unjustly undermine Holroyd's evidence. It says that "Some of the RUC officers interviewed by the Inquiry, in their apparent eagerness to deny Holroyd any credibility whatsoever, themselves made inaccurate and misleading statements which have unfortunately tarnished their own credibility".

=== David Ervine's claims ===
David Ervine, a member of the UVF sentenced to 11 years for possession of explosives in November 1974, dismissed allegations of collusion in the Dublin and Monaghan bombings as "sheer unadulterated nonsense", saying, "there comes a point when the concept insults me, insomuch as that a Provo could lie in bed and with a crystal ball... could pick their targets but a Prod could only do the same if there was an SAS man driving the car".

Ervine cited his own arrest, and the number of UVF members in prison at the time, as evidence that widespread collusion did not exist:

"The Royal Ulster Constabulary arrested me on possession of explosives; now why did they do that if we lived in a process of collusion? When I went into jail there were 240 UVF men in three compounds, packed in like sardines, and the UVF were a relatively small organisation in comparison to some of the others, but they made up a hell of a percentage of that jail. Where’s collusion there?"

=== Operation Denton ===
In May 2024 Iain Livingstone, head of Operation Denton, said that there was no doubt of collusion between the Glenanne gang and British authorities in the Dublin and Monaghan bombings.

In October 2025, the Belfast Telegraph reported that Operation Denton had established that the UVF bombing team met at the Rumford Street Loyalist Club near the Shankill Road the day before the attacks for a final briefing from their "commanding officer", who was a 34-year-old Royal Artillery Regiment veteran named Tommy West. Other members of the gang named in the report were:

- 26-year-old UVF member William Marchant (assassinated by the IRA in 1987)
- 35-year-old ex-loyalist internee Stanley Grey
- 36-year-old UVF member Eddie Brown, who worked as a doorman at the Rumford Street Loyalist Club
- 34-year-old William Mitchell, who was in charge of the Carrickfergus UVF at that time

== In popular culture ==
In 1975, Irish poet Eavan Boland wrote the poem Child of Our Time about the bombings, which was published in her 1975 collection The War Horse. The poem was an elegy for the two infants and the full-term unborn child and its mother who died in the bombing. Boland herself described the genesis of the poem: "I wrote it inspired – and I use the words with care – by a photograph I saw two days later on the front of a national newspaper whose most arresting feature was the expression on the face of the fireman who lifted that child, an expression of tenderness as if he were lifting his own child from its cradle to its mother’s breast."

The song "Raised by Wolves" by U2, from their 2014 album Songs of Innocence, references the Parnell Street and the Talbot Street bombing. The liner notes to the album mention Andy Rowen, a childhood friend of lead singer Bono who witnessed the aftermath of the bombings at the age of 11: "the scene never left him" and he struggled with addiction—"Bad", from the band's 1984 album The Unforgettable Fire, was written about him when he was homeless in London. When Bono called Rowen to ask his permission to write the song, Rowen told him he was holding a piece of the shrapnel from the bombing he had kept since then, to remind him of how it took a little piece of him.

During their Innocence + Experience Tour, the band performed "Sunday Bloody Sunday" with an animated video of a car similar to that used in the first bombing, overdubbed by a radio news report from the day as well as a speech from Ian Paisley, and on the following song, "Raised by Wolves", called for justice for the forgotten victims.

In his 2022 memoir Surrender: 40 Songs, One Story, Bono disclosed that at the time he and a friend often went to browse at the Dolphin Discs record store on Talbot Street, near where the bombs went off. On the day of the bombings, they would have probably gone there, but due to a strike by city bus drivers that day they had to cycle home from Mount Temple Comprehensive School instead.

The aftermath of the bombing is also portrayed in Roddy Doyle's 2010 novel The Dead Republic.

== See also ==
- 1972 and 1973 Dublin bombings
- Timeline of Ulster Volunteer Force actions

== Sources ==
- Barron Report:
  - "Interim Report of the Independent Commission of Inquiry into the Dublin and Monaghan Bombings" (PDF). Joint Committee on Justice, Equality, Defence and Women's Rights. December 2003.
  - Committee on Justice, Equality, Defence and Women's Rights (2004). "Proceedings of the Sub-Committee on the Barron Report". Oireachtas.
  - "Final Report" (PDF). 31 March 2004.
