= Timeline of Ulster Volunteer Force actions =

This is a timeline of actions by the Ulster Volunteer Force (UVF), an Ulster loyalist paramilitary group since 1966. It includes actions carried out by the Red Hand Commando (RHC), a group integrated into the UVF shortly after their formation in 1972. It also includes attacks claimed by the Protestant Action Force (PAF), a covername used by the UVF. Most of these actions took place during the conflict known as "the Troubles" in Northern Ireland.

The UVF's declared goal was to destroy Irish republican paramilitary groups. However, most of its victims were Irish Catholic civilians, who were often chosen at random. Whenever it claimed responsibility for its attacks, the UVF usually claimed that those targeted were Provisional Irish Republican Army (IRA) members or sympathisers. At other times, attacks on Catholic civilians were claimed as "retaliation" for IRA actions, since the IRA drew most of its support from majority-Catholic areas. Such retaliation was seen as both collective punishment and an attempt to weaken the IRA's support. Many retaliatory assaults on Catholics were claimed using the PAF covername. Members of the Royal Ulster Constabulary (RUC), the Ulster Defence Regiment (UDR) and the British Army colluded with the UVF in a number of incidents.

== 1960s ==
=== 1966 ===
- 1966: Sporadic petrol bomb attacks and vandalism targeting Catholic-owned property started in early 1966, particularly in and around the Shankill Road.
- 6 April: UVF members threw petrol bombs at a Catholic primary school—Holy Cross Girls' School—in Belfast. The attack happened two days before Terence O'Neill, Prime Minister of Northern Ireland, was to address a Catholic-Protestant reconciliation meeting there.
- 16 April: UVF members fired two shots through the front door of the home of a Unionist politician, Johnny McQuade, in the hope Republicans would be blamed.
- 7 May: UVF members petrol bombed a Catholic-owned pub on Upper Charleville Street, in the Shankill district of Belfast. Fire also engulfed the house next door, badly burning the elderly Protestant widow who lived there. She died of her injuries on 27 June. A Catholic woman escaped injury in another petrol bomb attack at her home in Northumberland Street twenty minutes later.
- 8 May: Two petrol bombs were thrown into the grounds of St. Mary's Training College on the Falls Road, Belfast, where an annual conference of Catholic organisations was being held.
- 21 May: The UVF issued a statement:
  From this day, we declare war against the Irish Republican Army and its splinter groups. Known IRA men will be executed mercilessly and without hesitation. Less extreme measures will be taken against anyone sheltering or helping them, but if they persist in giving them aid, then more extreme methods will be adopted... we solemnly warn the authorities to make no more speeches of appeasement. We are heavily armed Protestants dedicated to this cause.
- 27 May: Gusty Spence sent four UVF members to kill a man they believed to be an Irish Republican Army volunteer. When they arrived at his house on Baden Powell Street in Belfast, he was not at home. The men then drove around the Falls district in search of a Catholic. They shot John Scullion, a Catholic civilian, as he walked home. He died of his wounds on 11 June. Spence later wrote: "At the time, the attitude was that if you couldn't get an IRA man you should shoot a Taig, he's your last resort".
- 11 June: The UVF fired several shots at the home of a Catholic man in Eden near Carrickfergus, County Antrim.
- 25 June: The UVF tried to kill a well-known Republican in the Falls area of Belfast. He wasn't home so they broke into his house and set fire to it.
- 26 June: The UVF shot three Catholic civilians as they left a pub on Malvern Street, Belfast. One of them was killed.
- 28 June: The UVF was declared illegal.

=== 1967 ===
- 24 April: A Catholic man was shot and seriously wounded in Dunville Street off the Falls Road, Belfast. The police blamed the IRA but a statement purporting to be from the UVF refuted any IRA involvement and claimed the UVF's "Shankill Road Division" were responsible.

=== 1968 ===
- 20 June: Shortly after Nationalist Party MP Austin Currie and others began squatting in a house allocated to an unmarried 19-year-old Protestant woman in Caledon as part of the emerging civil rights movement, a statement was issued purporting to be from "Captain William Johnston of the Ulster Volunteer Force":
  As and from Saturday we resume our activities. We are resuming our activities against the IRA and Roman Catholic extremists because of Mr. Currie's statements at Stormont yesterday and his action in barricading himself in a house at Caledon today.

=== 1969 ===
==== January–June ====
- 1 January: A bomb planted by UVF members destroyed a republican memorial at Toomebridge, County Antrim, on the route of the People's Democracy march.
- 2 March: A bomb exploded at the "Long Stone" a prominent boulder painted green, white and gold to mark Catholic territory near Annalong, County Down. The explosion smashed windows in a wide area and one man was thrown from his bed. Six months earlier there had been another attempt to destroy the landmark. The area had seen a bitter dispute over an Orange Order parade route in the 1950s. Thomas McDowell, a UVF member who lived nearby later fatally injured planting a bomb in County Donegal, was believed to be responsible.
- 21 March: Loyalists bombed a Catholic church five miles outside Larne, causing extensive damage. The explosion also smashed windows at a nearby school. It marked the beginning of a new Loyalist bombing campaign.
- March–April: Members of the UVF and Ulster Protestant Volunteers (UPV) bombed water and electricity installations in Northern Ireland. The loyalists hoped the attacks would be blamed on the dormant IRA and on elements of the civil rights movement, which was demanding an end to discrimination against Catholics. The loyalists intended to bring down Ulster Unionist Party Prime Minister Terence O'Neill, who had promised some concessions to the civil rights movement. At the time, the bombings were indeed blamed on the IRA, and British soldiers were deployed to guard installations.
  - 30 March: Loyalists bombed an electricity substation just outside Belfast, causing blackouts across much of the city's south and east.
  - 4 April: Loyalists bombed a water pipeline at Dunadry, County Antrim.
  - 20 April: Loyalists bombed Silent Valley Reservoir and an electricity pylon in Kilmore, County Armagh.
  - 24 April: Loyalists again bombed the water pipeline at Dunadry.
  - 26 April: Loyalists bombed a water pipeline at Annalong, County Down, cutting off the water supply to much of Belfast. Two days later Terence O'Neill resigned and was replaced by fellow Ulster Unionist James Chichester-Clark.
- 27 April: A gelignite time bomb left at a Catholic church in Saintfield, County Down, was defused by the parish priest who cut a wire. The attack was linked to the UVF.

==== July–December ====
- July: A planned UVF attack in mid-July targeting St. Patrick's Catholic church in Portadown, County Armagh, with a 40 lb (18 kg) gelignite bomb was aborted.
- 5 August: RTE Studio bombing – A bomb damaged the front of the RTÉ Television Centre in Donnybrook, Dublin. The UVF claimed responsibility. This was the first attack the group claimed credit for in the Republic of Ireland.
- 12–17 August: 1969 Northern Ireland riots – Fierce clashes erupted across Northern Ireland, between Irish nationalists and unionists, including the Royal Ulster Constabulary (RUC). Eight people were killed, hundreds were wounded, and hundreds of homes and businesses were destroyed (the majority owned by Catholics and nationalists). The British Army were deployed on the streets of Northern Ireland. The Irish Army also set up field hospitals near the Irish border.
- 12 October: UVF members shot dead RUC officer Victor Arbuckle during street violence in the loyalist Shankill area of Belfast. Loyalists "had taken to the streets in protest at the Hunt Report, which recommended the disbandment of the B Specials and disarming of the RUC. A Catholic officer was standing next to Constable Arbuckle when he was shot". Arbuckle was the first RUC officer to be killed during the Troubles.
- 19 October: Thomas McDowell, a member of the UVF and UPV, was badly burnt while planting a bomb at a hydroelectric power station near Ballyshannon, County Donegal. He was electrocuted as he touched a live cable whilst attempting to plant a bomb at the base of a pylon, suffering serious burns, and he died of his injuries two days later, aged 45. This is when it was realized that the earlier bombings had also been carried out by loyalists, not republicans. The UVF issued a statement saying the attempted attack was a protest against the Irish Army units "still massed on the border in Co Donegal". The statement added: "so long as the threats from Éire continue, so long will the volunteers of Ulster's people's army strike at targets in Southern Ireland".
- 31 October: The UVF claimed responsibility for bombing the memorial to Wolfe Tone (leader of the United Irishmen) in Bodenstown, County Kildare, Republic of Ireland.
- 26 December: The UVF was believed to have been responsible for bombing the O'Connell Monument on O'Connell Street, Dublin. Little damage was done to the statue but the blast smashed windows in a half-mile radius.
- 28 December: A car bomb exploded outside the Garda Síochána central detective bureau in Dublin. Gardaí believed that the UVF was responsible and said that the nearby telephone exchange headquarters may have been the target.

== 1970s ==
=== 1970 ===
- January: The UVF began bombing Catholic-owned businesses in Protestant areas of Belfast. It issued a statement vowing to "remove republican elements from loyalist areas" and stop them "reaping financial benefit therefrom". The UVF carried out an estimated 27 bomb attacks in Northern Ireland in 1970 and another four bombings in the Republic. During 1970, 42 Catholic-owned licensed premises in Protestant areas were bombed, mainly by the UVF.
- 13 January: The UVF bombed a row of shops fronting on to the Crumlin Road from the predominantly Catholic Ardoyne area of Belfast.
- 26 January: The UVF bombed the Catholic-owned Eagle Taxi Depot, in Agnes Street, off the Shankill Road. The UVF setup its own taxi service shortly afterwards.
- 2 February: A UVF bomb caused minor damage at Drumaness Catholic church near Ballymena, County Antrim.
- 3 February: The UVF bombed the offices of the New Ulster Movement, a moderate Unionist pressure group from which the Alliance Party later emerged. Neighbouring shops on Botanic Avenue were also damaged.
- 8 February: It is believed that the UVF was responsible for exploding a bomb at the home of Sheelagh Murnaghan, a staunchly anti-physical force and anti-republican Roman Catholic Ulster Liberal Party MP. This was the beginning of a campaign against critics of militant loyalism.
- 18 February: The UVF bombed a TV relay station near Raphoe in County Donegal, Republic of Ireland. The mast transmitted television and radio signals from RTÉ, (the Irish national broadcaster), which could be received in Northern Ireland.
- 18 February: The UVF detonated a small bomb in the corridor of Crumlin Road courthouse following an earlier explosion at Crumlin Road Prison, Belfast, during the trial of several loyalists (including John McKeague) associated with the UVF, UPV, and Ulster Constitution Defence Committee (UCDC) charged with bomb attacks the previous year.
- 7 March: The UVF claimed responsibility for exploding a bomb at the home of Nationalist Party MP Austin Currie. On 2 July, shots were fired through the living room window of Currie's house while he and his wife and children were inside.
- 7 March: The UVF was blamed for an explosion at St. Thomas Aquinas Hall, the Catholic students' hostel at Queen's University Belfast.
- 26 March: A bomb damaged an electricity substation in Tallaght, near Dublin. An anonymous letter claimed responsibility on behalf of the UVF.
- 28 April: It is believed that the UVF was responsible for exploding a bomb at the home of liberal Ulster Unionist MP Richard Ferguson.
- 2 July: UVF gunmen fired several shots into the living room of Nationalist MP Austin Currie but his family escaped injury.
- 22 July: A bomb exploded at St. Mary's Catholic social club off Great Patrick Street in Belfast city centre.
- 22 July: Two explosions damaged the main Dublin-Belfast railway line at Baldoyle in north Dublin. A train narrowly avoided derailing as it passed over the damaged track. Gardaí believed the attack was the work of the UVF.
- 10 August: It is believed that the UVF was responsible for exploding a bomb at the home of liberal Ulster Unionist politician Anne Dickson.
- 11 September: The UVF bombed the Belfast offices of An Bórd Bainne, the Republic's state-run dairy board.
- 16 September: A shrapnel bomb exploded in a classroom of Trentaghmucklagh National School in St Johnston, County Donegal, Republic of Ireland. The school was empty at the time. It is believed the UVF were responsible.
- 17 September: A bomb exploded at a Gaelic cultural club, Cluain Ard, in Hawthorn Street, Belfast. A bomb also exploded at the offices of the Irish Independent newspaper in King Street.

=== 1971 ===
- January–April: Loyalists were responsible for seventeen significant bombings before the end of April 1971.
- 15 January: A bomb exploded at a Catholic church in Whitehouse, County Antrim. The UVF is suspected.
- 17 January: The UVF bombed the Daniel O'Connell monument in Glasnevin Cemetery, Dublin.
- 26 January: A bomb destroyed the Customs & Excise station at Lifford, County Donegal, Republic of Ireland. No warning had been given. It is believed the UVF were responsible.
- 8 February: The UVF bombed the Wolfe Tone statue in St Stephen's Green, Dublin.
- 10 March: The UVF claimed responsibility for an explosion at the home of Social Democratic and Labour Party MP Austin Currie. The UVF also claimed responsibility for a bomb at a grocery store on the Ballysillan Road, Belfast, and a bank raid in Ballycastle, County Antrim.
- 13 March: A bomb destroyed Squire's Hill Tavern at Ligoniel near where the bodies of three British soldiers kidnapped by the IRA were found.
- 27 March: A bomb exploded at St Malachy's College on the Antrim Road in Belfast. The UVF is suspected.
- 28 March: A bomb exploded at St Malachy's College old boys' club on the Crumlin Road in Belfast. The UVF is suspected.
- 2 May: British security forces uncovered a UVF store of gelignite explosive at Nutt's Corner outside Belfast.
- 10 July: British security forces found a UVF arms dump containing a dozen rifles and 2,000 rounds of ammunition at Hillsborough, County Down.
- 10 August: Following the introduction of internment the UVF exchanged fire with the Provisional IRA and Official IRA in the Springhill Estate in the Ballymurphy area of West Belfast. UVF snipers also opened fire on the Oldpark Road area of North Belfast, where another gun battle took place. MP Paddy Devlin claimed at a news conference that "eleven" areas of Belfast were being "terrorised" nightly by UVF gunmen.
- 9 October: The UVF exploded a bomb at the Catholic-owned Fiddler's House Bar in Belfast, which killed a Protestant civilian.
- 16 September: UVF member Samuel Nelson was found shot dead in a car on Downing Street, Belfast. He had been killed by other UVF members as a suspected informer.
- 4 December: McGurk's Bar bombing – Without warning, the UVF exploded a time bomb at Tramore Bar (aka McGurk's Bar) on North Queen Street, Belfast. The pub was frequented by members of the Catholic and Irish nationalist community. Fifteen Catholic civilians were killed and seventeen wounded. The UVF team had been ordered to bomb an IRA-run pub nearby, but decided that the Tramore Bar was an easier target. It was the highest death toll from a single incident in Belfast during the Troubles, and was the second-highest death toll caused by a UVF attack.
- 18 December: Without warning, the UVF exploded a bomb at the Catholic-owned Murtagh's Bar in Belfast, which killed a Catholic civilian patron.

=== 1972 ===
==== January–April ====
- 8 February: The "Red Hand Commando" claimed responsibility for killing a Catholic civilian, Bernard Rice (aged 49), in a drive-by shooting on Crumlin Road, Belfast.
- 13 March: The UVF shot dead a Catholic civilian, Patrick McCrory (aged 19), at his home on Ravenhill Avenue, Belfast.
- 15 April: The UVF killed a Catholic civilian, Sean McConville (aged 17), in a drive-by shooting on Crumlin Road, Belfast.
- 13–14 May: The UVF engaged the IRA in a series of gun battles in the interface area between Springmartin and Ballymurphy. A total of seven people were killed, five of whom were uninvolved civilians. Two UVF members were arrested by the RUC.

==== May–August ====
- 27 May: The UVF killed a Catholic civilian, Gerard Duddy (aged 20), in a drive-by shooting at the junction of Finaghy Road North and Andersonstown Road, Belfast.
- 28 May: The UVF killed a Catholic civilian, James Teer (aged 21), in a drive-by shooting on the Springfield Road, Belfast.
- 29 May: The UVF shot and killed a Catholic civilian, Thomas Wardlow (aged 32), Millfield, Belfast.
- 4 June: The UVF shot dead a Catholic civilian, Gerard Murray (aged 26), at his shop on Annesley Street, Belfast.
- 23 June: The UVF carried out a drive-by shooting on a group of Catholics standing outside a bank at the corner of Antrim Road and Atlantic Avenue, Belfast. One Catholic civilian, Patrick McCullough (aged 17), was killed and another wounded.
- 3 July: The UVF shot dead a Catholic civilian, John O'Hanlon (aged 38), and dumped his body off Twickenham Street, Belfast.
- 5 July: The UVF shot a Catholic civilian, Laurence McKenna (aged 22) at the junction of Falls Road and Waterford Street, Lower Falls, Belfast. He died three days later, on 8 July.
- 11/12 July: UVF and UDA members shot dead an intellectually disabled 15-year-old Catholic (David McClenaghan) at his home on Southport Street, Belfast, after reportedly raping his mother.
- 22 July: The UVF shot dead two Catholic civilians (Rosemary McCartney, aged 27, and Patrick O'Neill, aged 26). The bodies were found in an abandoned car, Forthriver Road, Glencairn, Belfast.
- 16 August: The UVF shot dead a Protestant civilian (William Spence, aged 32) in the Long Bar, Shankill, Belfast, where he worked as a barman.
- 20 August: The UVF shot dead a Protestant civilian (James Lindsay, aged 45), and dumped his body on the Glencairn Road, Glencairn, Belfast.
- 26 August: The UVF shot dead two Catholic civilians in Belfast. One, John Nulty (aged 26), was found on Agnes Street, Shankill; the other, Patrick Kelly (aged 26), was found on Benwell Street, Lower Oldpark.

==== September–December ====
- 14 September: The UVF exploded a car bomb outside the Imperial Hotel on Cliftonville Road, Belfast, which killed three civilians, two Protestants (Andrew McKibben and Martha Smilie), and a Catholic (Anne Murray, who died of her wounds two days later, on 16 September 1972).
- 16 September: The British Army shot dead a UVF member (Sinclair Johnston, aged 27) during a riot in Larne.
- 26 September: The UVF exploded a car bomb outside a social club on Upper Library Street, Belfast. A Catholic civilian, Daniel McErlane (aged 46) died of his injuries the following day.
- 28 September: The UVF shot dead a Protestant civilian, Edward Pavis (aged 32), at his home on Glenvarlock Street, Belfast.
- 29 September: The UVF shot dead a Protestant milkman, Thomas Paisley (aged 49), while carrying out a robbery at a farmhouse on Straid Road, Ballynure, County Antrim.
- 30 September: The UVF exploded a car bomb at Conlon's Bar, Belfast, which killed two Catholic civilians.
- 4 October: A Catholic civilian, Patrick Connolly (aged 23), was killed when the UVF threw a grenade into his home on Deramore Drive, Portadown, County Armagh. His mother and brother were wounded. The grenade was of a type made in the United Kingdom "for use by the British Armed Forces" and the attack has been linked to the Glenanne gang.
- 7 October: The UVF exploded a car bomb at the Long Bar on Leeson Street, Belfast, which killed a Catholic civilian, Olive McConnell (aged 23).
- 13 October: The UVF firebombed several public houses including the Ballyhackamore Inn, the Balmoral Inn and the Rosetta Bar.
- 29 October: The UVF killed a Catholic civilian (Michael Turner, aged 16) in a drive-by shooting on Cliftonville Road, Belfast.
- 31 October: The "Red Hand Commandos" shot dead a Catholic civilian (James Kerr, aged 17) at his garage workplace on Lisburn Road, Belfast.
- 11 November: The "Red Hand Commandos" shot dead a Catholic civilian (Gerard Kelly, aged 58), at his newsagent's shop, Crumlin Road, Belfast.
- 21 November: The UVF shot dead a Catholic civilian, Joseph McIlroy (aged 30), at his home on Sandhill Drive, Bloomfield, Belfast.
- 27 November: The UVF shot dead a 14-year-old Catholic civilian, Rory Gormley, who was traveling in a car at the junction of Downing and Ariel streets, Shankill, Belfast.
- 1 December: Two car bombs exploded in Dublin. One exploded at 7:58 p.m on Eden Quay and one exploded at 8:16 p.m on Sackville Place. A man described as having an English accent sent a telephoned warning to a Belfast newspaper just a few minutes before the first explosion. Two civilians (George Bradshaw and Thomas Duffy) were killed and 127 wounded. No group initially claimed responsibility, but the UVF did so later.
- 14 December: The UVF exploded a car bomb at Dolan's Bar in Killeter, near Castlederg, County Tyrone, which killed Kathleen Dolan (aged 19), a Catholic civilian.
- 20 December: The UVF killed a Catholic civilian in a drive-by shooting at Clonmore, County Armagh.
- 21 December: A Catholic civilian was killed in a drive-by shooting on Clandeboye Road, Bangor. He had been waiting for his regular lift to work. It is thought the Red Hand Commandos were responsible.
- 28 December: Belturbet bombing – Loyalists associated with the UVF detonated three bombs in the Republic of Ireland within thirty minutes of each other. A car bomb exploded without warning outside the post office in Belturbet, County Cavan. Two teenaged civilians (Geraldine O'Reilly and Patrick Stanley) were killed and eight wounded. Another car bomb exploded without warning in Clones, County Monaghan, wounding a further two civilians. The other bomb exploded without warning outside a pub in Mulnagoad, near Pettigo, County Donegal. There were no injuries.
- 30 December: The UVF shot dead a Catholic civilian, Hugh Martin (aged 56), in his car near his workplace on Lichfield Avenue, Belfast.

=== 1973 ===
==== January–June ====
- 20 January: After issuing an inadequate warning, the UVF exploded a car bomb on Sackville Place, Dublin. It killed one civilian (Thomas Douglas, originally from Scotland), and wounded 14 others.
- 4 February: The UVF shot dead a Catholic civilian, Seamus Gilmore, at his workplace, Mount Pleasant Filling Station, Ballysillan Road, Belfast.
- 7 February: The UVF (as part of the United Loyalist Council) held a one-day strike to "re-establish some sort of Protestant or loyalist control over the affairs of the province". Loyalist paramilitaries forcibly stopped many people going to work and closed many businesses that had opened. There were eight bombings and thirty-five acts of arsons. The British Army shot dead a UVF member, Robert Bennett (aged 31), during a riot on Albertbridge Road, Belfast.
- 18 February: The UVF killed two Catholic civilians, Anthony Coleman (aged 30) and David McAleese (aged 38), in a drive-by shooting on Divis Street, Belfast.
- 19 February: A Protestant civilian, William Cooke, was found shot dead at Wolfhill Quarry on the edge of Belfast. The UVF killed him as an alleged informer.
- 1 March: The UVF shot dead a Catholic taxi driver, Stephen Kernan (aged 54), in his car on Mansfield Street, Belfast.
- 2 March: The UVF shot dead a Catholic bus driver, Patrick Crossin (aged 34), as he stopped at a bus stop on Woodvale Road, Belfast.
- 4 March: A British Army soldier died four weeks after being shot by the UVF during a riot on Newtownards Road/Welland Street, Belfast.
- 15 March: A Catholic civilian was killed when the UVF exploded a bomb at his house in Jordanstown.
- 14 April: The UVF killed a Protestant Official IRA volunteer in a drive-by shooting on McClure Street, Belfast.
- 22 April: A UVF member was found dead in his cell at Crumlin Road Prison, Belfast. It is believed he was poisoned by fellow UVF prisoners as part of an internal dispute.
- 11 May: The UVF shot a Catholic civilian on Raglan Street, Belfast. He died on 14 May.
- 17 May: The UVF carried out a gun and grenade attack on the Jubilee Arms pub on Lavinia Street, Belfast. A Catholic civilian was killed.
- 17 May: An Ulster Defence Regiment (UDR) soldier shot a UVF member as he tried to steal a car on Shankill Road, Belfast. He died on 19 May.
- 31 May: The UVF were blamed for a gun and grenade attack on Muldoon's Bar in Belfast. An English seaman was killed.
- 31 May: The UVF were blamed for a bomb attack at McGlade's Bar in Belfast. A Catholic civilian was killed.
- 3 June: The UVF shot dead two Protestant civilians in a house on Druse Street, Belfast.

==== July–December ====
- 6 July: The UVF killed an Official IRA volunteer (Patrick Bracken, aged 27), in a drive-by shooting on the Falls Road, Belfast.
- 21 July: The UVF shot a Protestant civilian during a robbery of the Horseshoe Bar, Belfast. He died on 24 July.
- 22 July: The UVF shot dead a German seaman and dumped his body in an alleyway of Klondyke Street, Belfast.
- 5 August: The UVF shot dead two Catholic civilians at their farmhouse at Broughadoey near Moy. Their two-year-old son was also wounded by gunfire. The attack has been linked to the Glenanne gang.
- 9 August: The UVF killed a Presbyterian civilian from County Donegal when it shot at his company van on the motorway near Templepatrick.
- 11 August: The UVF shot dead a Protestant civilian on Ormeau Road, Belfast.
- 15 August: The UVF exploded a car bomb at Sportsman's Inn, Belfast. It killed a Catholic civilian.
- 20 August: A Catholic civilian was killed when the UVF threw a grenade into his house on Grampian Avenue, Belfast.
- 25 August: The UVF exploded a bomb at a garage on Cliftonville Road, Belfast. It then shot dead the three Catholic civilians who worked there.
- 27 August: Loyalist paramilitaries believed to be the UVF or RHC left a car bomb outside the Roman Catholic church (St. Patrick's & St. Brigid's) in the town on 26 August 1973. It was timed to explode as massgoers left the church. But the service ran late, and the bomb detonated when the congregation were still inside the church, avoiding large-scale loss of life. 50 people were injured, 3 of them seriously, including a BBC journalist who needed an arm amputated.
- 28 August: Two UVF bombs explode in Armagh injuring 20 people.
- 28 September: A car bomb exploded outside a grocery shop and house in Pettigo, County Donegal, Republic of Ireland. No warning was given and a number of people were injured. It is believed that loyalists associated with the UVF were to blame, and a Garda report suggested that British soldiers may have been involved. The bomb exploded just yards across the border. The British Army had been scheduled to patrol the border in the area that night but did not arrive.
- 1 October: UVF gunmen hijacked a taxi at Annadale Embankment in Belfast and shot dead the passenger, who was a Catholic civilian.
- 28 October: A Catholic civilian was wounded by a booby trap bomb planted by the UVF on a farm at Carnteel. He died on 8 November.
- 29 October: The UVF shot dead a Catholic civilian at his home in Banbridge. The attack has been linked to the Glenanne gang.
- 1 November: The UVF shot dead a Catholic civilian as he drove out of his workplace on Dayton Street, Belfast.
- 1 November: The UVF exploded a bomb at the Avenue Bar, Belfast. It killed a Catholic civilian.
- 9 November: The UVF exploded a bomb at the Sunflower Bar, Belfast. It killed a Protestant civilian.
- 12 November: The UVF detonate three bombs in Armagh and one more in Quinn's Bar in Dungannon. A number of people are injured.
- 17–18 November: A UVF member was killed when his bomb prematurely exploded at a farmhouse in Desertmartin. A 500 lb UVF bomb destroyed shops and flats in the Catholic Newington area of north Belfast.
- 18 November: The UVF leadership declared a ceasefire to allow the political process to develop.
- 28 December: The British Army shot dead a UVF member during a fight outside the Bayardo Bar, Belfast. Hours later, UVF and UDA snipers shot dead a Catholic RUC officer on Forthriver Road, Belfast. They had robbed a supermarket to lure his police patrol to the scene. The attack was thought to be a retaliation for the killing of the UVF member.

=== 1974 ===
- 10 January: The UVF shot dead a Catholic civilian near his workplace on Milltown Row, Belfast.
- 14 January: The body of a Protestant civilian was found in a field near Carrowdore. It is believed he was shot by the UVF.
- 17 January: The UVF launched a gun attack on Boyle's Bar in Cappagh. Two gunmen entered the pub and opened fire indiscriminately on the customers. A Catholic civilian was killed and three others wounded. The attack has been linked to the "Glenanne gang".
- 30 January: The UVF shot dead a Protestant civilian at his home on Gosford Place, Belfast. It believed he was an informer.
- 4 February: The UVF shot dead a Catholic civilian outside his garage on Whiterock Gardens, Belfast.
- 19 February: Two civilians (Patrick Molloy, a Catholic, and Jack Wylie, a Protestant) were killed when the UVF exploded a bomb at Trainor's Bar, Kilmore, County Armagh. Two other men were injured. The attack has been linked to the "Glenanne gang". In 1981, a serving UDR soldier, a former UDR soldier and a former UVF member were convicted of the murders.
- 28 February: The UVF exploded a bomb at Red Star Bar, Belfast, killing a Protestant civilian.
- 5 March: Nine people are injured when the UVF carries out a bomb attack on a house in Mourne Crescent, Coalisland.
- 11 March: The UVF shot dead a Catholic civilian in an attack on Bunch of Grapes Bar, Belfast.
- 15 March: The UVF shot dead a Catholic civilian on the Ormeau Road, Belfast.
- 24 March: The UVF shot dead a Protestant civilian near his home on Spruce Street, Belfast.
- 29 March: Two Catholic civilians, James Mitchell and Joseph Donnelly were killed when the UVF exploded a bomb at Conway's Bar, Belfast.
- 1 April: The UVF shot dead one of its own members, Jim Hanna, on Mansfield Street in Belfast. It claimed that the victim, the organisation's commander, was an informer.
- 6 April: The UVF shot dead a Protestant civilian as she walked with her boyfriend on Shankill Road, Belfast.
- 16 April: A UVF member died when his bomb prematurely exploded in a house on Union Street, Portadown.
- 21 April: The UVF shot dead civilian Sinn Féin member James Murphy at his garage at Corravehy, near Derrylin.
- 2 May: Six Catholic civilians were killed and eighteen wounded when the UVF exploded a bomb at Rose & Crown Bar on Ormeau Road, Belfast.
- 7 May: The UVF shot dead a married couple (James and Gertrude Devlin) near their home at Congo Road, outside Dungannon. As they were driving home, a man in British Army uniform stopped their car and opened fire on them. Their daughter, Patricia, in the back seat, was wounded. A UDR soldier was convicted for the killings.
- 14 May: The UVF and Sinn Féin were declared legal following the passing of legislation at Westminster.
- 15 May: The Ulster Workers' Council strike began in protest at the Sunningdale Agreement. For the next two weeks, loyalist paramilitaries forcibly tried to stop many people going to work and to close any businesses that had opened.
- 17 May: Dublin and Monaghan bombings – 33 civilians were killed and 300 wounded when the UVF exploded three car bombs in Dublin and one in Monaghan (both in the Republic of Ireland). No warning had been given. This was the highest number of casualties in a single incident during "The Troubles". It has been alleged that members of the British security forces were involved. The UVF did not claim responsibility until 15 July 1993.
- 18 May: A UDA member shot dead a UVF member during a fight in North Star Bar, Belfast.
- 24 May: Two Catholic civilians were shot dead in their pub, the Wayside Halt, during a joint UVF/UFF operation to shut down Catholic-owned pubs in and around Ballymena.
- 28 May: The Ulster Workers' Council strike ended.
- 7 June: The UVF linked group the Red Hand Commandos, bombed a Catholic church, three people were midledly injured in the attack, on the same they tried bomb a Catholic pub but failed. Both attacks happened in Belfast City Centre.
- 12 July: The UVF shot dead a Catholic civilian in Bangor.
- 16 July: A Catholic civilian was killed when the UVF exploded a bomb at Sunflower Bar, Belfast.
- 11 September: There was an attempted car bomb attack in Blacklion, County Cavan, Republic of Ireland. Three masked gunmen in British military uniform had hijacked the car, placed a time bomb inside and forced the owner to drive it into the village. They claimed to be from the UVF and threatened to attack his family if he did not comply. The driver parked the car in the middle of the village and alerted the Irish Army and Garda. The village was evacuated and the Army carried out a controlled explosion on the car. They estimated that the bomb would have destroyed most of the village.
- 16 September: The UVF left a booby-trap bomb in a parcel outside a factory in Pomeroy which killed the owner, a Catholic civilian.
- 18 September: The UVF killed a member of the Official IRA youth section in a drive-by shooting on Clifton Street, Belfast.
- 25 September: The UVF shot dead a Catholic civilian on Limestone Road, Belfast.
- 30 September: The UVF shot dead a Catholic civilian at his workplace, a bakery on Orby Road, Belfast.
- 4 October: The UVF shot dead a Protestant civilian near his workplace on Moonstone Street, Belfast. He was mistaken for his Catholic workmate.
- 10 October: The "Protestant Action Force" claimed responsibility for shooting dead a Catholic civilian at a house in Newtownabbey.
- 11 October: The "Protestant Action Force" claimed responsibility for shooting dead a Catholic civilian as he walked to work along Brougham Street, Belfast.
- 13 October: The UVF shot dead a Catholic civilian and dumped his body in a quarry on Hightown Road, Belfast.
- 18 October: The "Protestant Action Force" claimed responsibility for exploding a bomb outside a Catholic school in Belfast, injuring twelve people (including children).
- 18 October: The "Protestant Action Force" claimed responsibility for shooting two Catholic street-sweepers in Belfast.
- 21 October: The UVF killed two Catholic civilians in a drive-by shooting on Falls Road, Belfast. Billy Hutchinson was later convicted for his part in these killings. Hutchinson was to become a leading spokesman for the Progressive Unionist Party.
- 27 October: The "Protestant Action Force" claimed responsibility for killing a Catholic civilian, whose body was found at the back of a farmhouse at Mullantine, near Portadown. He had been beaten, strangled and then shot by UVF members after taking a lift from Lurgan to Portadown, together with a friend who managed to escape. The attack has been linked to the "Glenanne gang".
- 8 November: The "Protestant Action Force" claimed responsibility for killing a Catholic civilian who was found shot dead in a derelict bakery on Byron Street, Belfast. This was claimed as retaliation for the Guildford pub bombings.
- 9 November: The "Protestant Action Force" claimed responsibility for shooting dead two Catholic civilians in Templepatrick.
- 12 November: The "Protestant Action Force" claimed responsibility for shooting dead a Catholic civilian at St Mary Youth Centre on Carolan Road, Belfast.
- 15 November: The UVF shot a Catholic civilian in Maguire's Bar, Larne. He died on 20 November.
- 20 November: The "Protestant Action Force" claimed responsibility for a gun attack at Falls Bar in Aughnamullen, near Clonoe. A Catholic civilian (the pub owner) was killed and a customer was wounded. This was claimed as retaliation for the killing of an RUC officer in Craigavon earlier that day. A British Army UDR soldier was later convicted for the attack, which has been linked to the "Glenanne gang".
- 23 November: A Catholic civilian was found dead in a car on Hightown Road, near Belfast. He had been kidnapped and shot in the head by the UVF.
- 29 November: The UVF bombed McArdle's Bar in Crossmaglen. Six people were wounded and one, a Catholic civilian, died of his wounds almost a year later on 15 November 1975. The attack has been linked to the "Glenanne gang".
- 29 November: The UVF bombed Hughes Bar, Church Street, Newry. Many people were wounded and one, a Catholic civilian (John Mallon, aged 21), died of his wounds on 15 December 1974.

=== 1975 ===
- 10 January: The UVF claimed responsibility for shooting dead Provisional IRA volunteer John Francis Green at a farmhouse in Tullynageer, County Monaghan, Republic of Ireland.
- 6 February: A Catholic civilian, Colette Brown (aged 31), was found shot dead by the side of Killyglen Road, Larne, County Antrim. She had been "sentenced to death" by a loyalist group for allegedly passing information to the IRA. Two men were convicted for her killing: one a UVF member and the other a UDR lance-corporal.
- 8 February: The UVF shot dead a Catholic civilian, James Sullivan (aged 30), at his home on Lesley Street, Ligoniel, Belfast. He was a former internee.
- 10 February: The UVF shot dead a Catholic civilian, Joseph Fitzpatrick (aged 19), as he worked sweeping the street at Cooke Place, off Ormeau Road, Belfast.
- 10 February: The UVF shot dead two Catholic civilians, Arthur Mulholland (aged 65) and Eugene Doyle (aged 18), in a gun attack on Hayden's Bar, Gortavale, near Rock, County Tyrone. Four others were wounded.
- 14 February: The UVF shot a Catholic civilian (Brendan Doherty, aged 23), on the Portrush Road, Coleraine, County Londonderry. He died ten days later on 24 February.
- 20 February: The UVF exploded a bomb at the Railway Bar, Shore Road, Greencastle, Belfast, killing a Catholic civilian (Gerald McKeown, aged 20).
- 28 February: The UVF killed a Catholic civilian and wounded another in a drive-by shooting on lower Antrim Road near Camberwell Terrace, Belfast.
- March: A feud began between the UVF and Ulster Defence Association (UDA)/Ulster Freedom Fighters (UFF), the other main loyalist group.
- 8 March: The UVF shot dead a Catholic civilian at his home on Clifton Drive, Belfast.
- 9 March: Loyalists firebombed a fleet of fishing trawlers at Greencastle, County Donegal, Republic of Ireland. Fourteen boats were damaged. Both the UVF and UDA claimed responsibility, with the UDA making "the unlikely claim that the fleet had been used to ferry arms ashore for the IRA after a rendezvous with a Soviet submarine".
- 13 March: The UVF carried out a gun and grenade attack on Conway's Bar, Greencastle, Belfast, killing a Catholic civilian (Marie Doyle, aged 38), and wounding a UVF member wounded when the bomb he was planting exploded prematurely. He died on 28 April.
- 15 March: The UVF shot dead two UDA members, John Fulton (aged 20) and Stephen Goatley (aged 19), in the Alexandra Bar, York Road, Belfast, as a result of a loyalist feud.
- 16 March: A Royal Ulster Constabulary (RUC) officer, Mildred Harrison (aged 26), was killed by a UVF bomb while on foot patrol passing the Ormeau Arms Bar, High Street, Bangor.
- 21 March: A Protestant civilian died four months after being shot by the UVF during a bank robbery on Crumlin Road, Belfast.
- 1 April: The "Protestant Action Force" claimed responsibility for shooting dead a Catholic civilian and wounding her Protestant husband as they walked through a park near Garvaghy Road, Portadown. The attack has been linked to the "Glenanne gang".
- 3 April: The "Protestant Action Force" claimed responsibility for shooting dead a Catholic civilian near his home at Ballyoran Park, off the Garvaghy Road in Portadown. The attack has been linked to the "Glenanne gang".
- 5 April: The UVF shot dead a Catholic civilian as he walked home at Etna Drive, Belfast.
- 5 April: The "Protestant Action Force" claimed responsibility for bombing McLaughlin's bar in Belfast. Two Catholic civilians were killed.
- 7 April: The UVF shot dead a Catholic civilian at Carnmoney Road North, Newtownabbey, as he walked to work.
- 7 April: The UVF kidnapped and shot dead two UDA members (Hugh McVeigh, aged 36, and David Douglas, aged 20); the bodies were found buried in a field near Whitehead, County Antrim on 1 September 1975.
- 11 April: The British Army shot dead a UVF member (Robert Wadsworth, aged 21) immediately after he had carried out a gun and bomb attack on the Jubilee Arms, Lavinia Street, Belfast.
- 12 April: The "Red Hand Commando" claimed responsibility for a gun and bomb attack on the Strand Bar, Anderson Street, Belfast. Six Catholic civilians were killed.
- 12 April: The "Protestant Action Force" claimed responsibility for shooting a Catholic civilian at his home in Glencull near Aughnacloy. He died of his wounds on 22 April 1975. The attack has been linked to the "Glenanne gang".
- 21 April: The "Protestant Action Force" claimed responsibility for killing three Catholic siblings (Marion Bowen (21), Seamus McKenna (25) and Michael McKenna (27)) with a booby trap bomb in Killyliss, near Granville, County Tyrone. The bomb had been planted in a house that was being renovated. Mrs. Bowen was 8 months pregnant. The attack has been linked to the "Glenanne gang".
- 27 April: Bleary Darts Club shooting – The "Protestant Action Force" claimed responsibility for a gun attack on a Catholic-frequented social club in Bleary. Gunmen burst into the club and opened fire indiscriminately, killing three Catholic civilians and wounding ten other people. The attack has been linked to the "Glenanne gang".
- 14 May: The "Protestant Action Force" claimed responsibility for an attempted bomb attack on the Catholic-owned Hill Tavern in Belfast. A 15 lb bomb was thrown into the pub but the security guard kicked it outside before it exploded. Seven were hurt by the blast.
- 18 May: UVF members stabbed-to-death a Provisional IRA volunteer in Castlewellan.
- 21 May: The "Protestant Action Force" claimed responsibility for blowing-up the Christian Brothers Past Pupils Union building on Antrim Road, Belfast.
- 22 May: The "Protestant Action Force" claimed responsibility for killing a Catholic civilian on Hightown Road, Newtownabbey. He was killed by a booby-trap bomb hidden in a flask at the building site where he was working.
- 23 May: The "Protestant Action Force" claimed responsibility for shooting dead two Catholic civilians in a flat in Mount Vernon, Belfast. The two brothers had been playing cards with Protestant friends. The gunmen told them to lie face-down and shot them in the back of the head.
- 24 May: Masked gunmen exploded a bomb at the home of a Catholic family in Moy. Much of the house was destroyed and six children were injured. In 1981, a serving UDR soldier, a former UDR soldier and a former UVF member were convicted of the attack, which has been linked to the "Glenanne gang".
- 25 May: The UVF shot dead a Protestant civilian on Lettercor Road, near Gortin.
- 27 May: The UVF shot dead a Catholic civilian as he drove along the road at Scallen, near Irvinestown.
- 27 May: A Catholic civilian died nearly three months after being wounded in a UVF gun and bomb attack on Bush Bar, Leeson Street, Belfast.
- 10 June: The Provisional IRA shot dead a UVF member in his shop on Crumlin Road, Belfast.
- 12 June: Two UVF members were killed when the bomb they intended to plant prematurely exploded as they drove along Great Patrick Street, Belfast.
- 19 June: The "Protestant Action Force" claimed responsibility for killing a Catholic civilian in north Belfast. He was killed by a bomb left in an oil can at a filling station on Great Patrick Street.
- 20 June: The "Protestant Action Force" claimed responsibility for shooting dead a Catholic civilian at his home on Ballymena Street, Belfast.
- 22 June: The "Protestant Action Force" claimed responsibility for killing a Catholic civilian who was found shot dead on the road to the Knockagh Monument, near Greenisland.
- 22 June: The UVF tried to derail a train by planting a bomb on the railway line near Straffan, County Kildare, Republic of Ireland. The train was carrying 300 members of the Official republican movement to a commemoration at Bodenstown. A civilian tried to stop the UVF members, and was stabbed-to-death. However, his actions delayed the explosion enough to let the train pass safely.
- 28 June: The UVF shot dead a Catholic civilian outside Throne Hospital, Belfast.
- 13 July: The UVF shot dead a UDA member in Taughmonagh, Belfast. Loyalist feud.
- 27 July: The UVF shot dead Mid-Ulster brigadier Billy Hanna outside his home in Lurgan. He was also a captain in the British Army's Ulster Defence Regiment (UDR).
- 31 July: Miami Showband killings – UVF members (some of whom were also UDR soldiers) shot dead three members of an Irish showband at Buskhill, near Loughbrickland. The gunmen staged a bogus British Army checkpoint, stopped the showband's minibus and ordered the musicians out. Two UVF men then hid a time bomb in the bus, but it exploded and they were killed. The other gunmen then opened fire on the musicians and fled. The attack has been linked to the "Glenanne gang".
- 1 August: Two Catholic civilians were killed and several wounded when gunmen opened fire on a minibus near Gilford. The bus had been returning from a bingo session when it was stopped at a bogus UDR checkpoint. The UVF were believed to have been responsible and attack has been linked to the "Glenanne gang".
- 13 August: The Provisional IRA carried out a gun and bomb attack on the Bayardo Bar, Shankill Road, Belfast. A UVF member and four Protestant civilians were killed.
- 16 August: The UVF shot dead a Catholic civilian as he sat in his car on Glenbank Place, Belfast.
- 22 August: The UVF launched a gun and bomb attack on McGleenan's Bar on Upper English Street, Armagh. One gunman opened fire while another planted the bomb. It exploded as they ran to a getaway car, causing the building to collapse. Three Catholic civilians were killed (one of whom died on 28 August) and many more were wounded. The attack has been linked to the "Glenanne gang".
- 24 August: The "Protestant Action Force" claimed responsibility for kidnapping and shooting dead two Catholic civilians near Newtownhamilton. The two men were driving home from a Gaelic football match in Dublin when they were stopped at a fake military checkpoint by men in British Army uniform. They were found shot dead a short distance away. The attack has been linked to the "Glenanne gang".
- 27 August: A Protestant civilian was shot dead at his home at The Crescent off Erinvale Drive, Belfast. Although the Sutton Database blames republicans, Lost Lives states that the man, John Barry, was killed by the UVF.
- 29 August: The UVF carried out a drive-by shooting on people standing outside the Rose & Crown pub on Ormeau Road, Belfast. A 15-year-old Catholic civilian was killed.
- 1 September: The UVF shot dead civilian Social Democratic and Labour Party member Denis Mullen at his home in Collegeland, County Armagh. The attack has been linked to the "Glenanne gang".
- 1 September: The UVF shot dead a Protestant civilian in a scrapyard near Newtownabbey. The Catholic owners were the intended targets.
- 3 September: The UVF shot dead two Catholic civilians at their farmhouse on Hightown Road near Belfast.
- 4 September: The UVF launched a gun and bomb attack on McCann's Bar in Ballyhegan. Eleven people were wounded and a Catholic civilian died from her wounds on 22 September. The attack has been linked to the "Glenanne gang".
- 7 September: The UVF shot dead one of its own members on a farm near Templepatrick. It claimed he was an informer.
- 2 October: October 1975 Northern Ireland attacks – The UVF shot dead four Catholic civilians at their workplace, Casey's Bottling Plant, in Belfast.
- 2 October: A Catholic civilian was killed by a UVF booby-trap bomb at his photography shop on Cranburn Street, Belfast.
- 2 October: A Catholic civilian was killed in a UVF gun and grenade attack on McKenna's Bar near Aldergrove Airport.
- 2 October: A Protestant civilian was killed in a UVF bomb attack on Anchor Bar, Killyleagh.
- 2 October: Four UVF members were killed when their bomb prematurely exploded as they drove along a road in Farrenlester, near Coleraine.
- 3 October: The UVF was again declared a 'proscribed' (illegal) organisation.
- 8 October: A Catholic civilian died six weeks after being shot by the UVF on Shore Road, Belfast.
- 14 October: The UVF shot dead one of its own members and dumped his body off Aberdeen Street, Belfast. Internal dispute.
- 17 October: The UVF shot dead a Protestant taxi driver as he arrived to pick up a passenger on Cavehill Road, Belfast. They mistakenly assumed he was a Catholic.
- 23 October: The UVF shot dead two Catholic civilians at their home in Listamlet. A contemporary newspaper article reported that "[British] Army issue ammunition" had been used. The attack has been linked to the "Glenanne gang".
- 29 October: The UVF shot dead a Catholic civilian at his home in Lurgan.
- 25 November: The UVF gang known as the "Shankill Butchers" kidnapped and killed a Catholic civilian, Francis Crossin (aged 34), who had been walking along Library Street, off Royal Avenue, Belfast. He had been beaten, his throat slit and his body dumped in an entry between Wimbledon Street and Bisley Street.
- 29 November: The UVF shot dead one of its own members in a car on Downing Street, Belfast. Internal dispute.
- 30 November: The UVF shot dead one of its own members in a car on Nixon Street, Belfast. Internal dispute.
- 19 December: Donnelly's Bar and Kay's Tavern attacks – A car bomb exploded without warning at Kay's Tavern in Dundalk, County Louth, Republic of Ireland. Two civilians were killed and twenty wounded. A short time later, gunmen attacked Donnelly's Bar and filling station in Silverbridge, less than ten miles away in County Armagh. They fired at people outside the building, then fired on the customers and threw a bomb inside. Three Catholic civilians were killed and six wounded. The "Red Hand Commando" claimed both attacks and it is believed they were co-ordinated. They have been linked to the "Glenanne gang".
- 26 December: The UVF bombed the Catholic-owned Vallelly's Bar at Ardress. A Catholic civilian died of his wounds on 30 December. The attack has been linked to the "Glenanne gang".

=== 1976 ===
- 4 January: Reavey and O'Dowd killings – The UVF shot dead six Catholic civilians in County Armagh. UVF men broke into a Catholic-owned house in Whitecross and shot dead three brothers. About 20 minutes later, UVF men entered another Catholic-owned house in Ballydougan and shot dead another three men, all of whom were members of the Social Democratic and Labour Party. At least one officer of the Royal Ulster Constabulary's Special Patrol Group was involved in the attacks, which have been linked to the "Glenanne gang".
- 10 January: The UVF shot dead a Catholic civilian on Cliftonville Road, Belfast.
- 17 January: The UVF launched a no-warning bomb attack on Sheridan's Bar at New Lodge Road, Belfast. Two Catholic civilians were killed and 26 wounded.
- 22 January: The UVF shot dead a Protestant civilian on Ballyutoag Road, Belfast. They believed he was a Catholic.
- 25 January: The UVF shot dead a Protestant civilian on Union Street, Portadown.
- 7 February: The "Shankill Butchers" kidnapped and killed a Catholic civilian in Belfast. He had been beaten, his throat slashed, and his body dumped on Forthriver Way.
- 9 February: The "Shankill Butchers" shot dead two Protestant civilians on Cambrai Street, Belfast, believing they were Catholics.
- 14 February: A bomb exploded without warning on the main street of Swanlinbar, County Cavan, Republic of Ireland. It is believed the UVF was responsible.
- 19 February: The UVF shot dead a Protestant civilian on Manderson Street, Belfast. They believed he was a Catholic.
- 22 February: The "Shankill Butchers" kidnapped and killed a Catholic civilian in Belfast. He had been beaten, his throat slashed, and his body dumped on Mayo Street.
- 27 February: The Provisional IRA shot dead a UVF member outside Victor's Bar, Belfast.
- 7 March: Castleblayney bombing – The UVF exploded a no-warning car bomb at Three Star Inn, Castleblayney, County Monaghan, Republic of Ireland. One civilian was killed and several others wounded. The attack has been linked to the "Glenanne gang".
- 9 March: The UVF attacked a restaurant, Golden Pheasant Inn, between Annahilt and Baileysmill. Gunmen shot dead the two Catholic owners and then exploded bombs inside, destroying the building.
- 13 March: The UDA beat-to-death a UVF member on Aberdeen Street, Belfast. Loyalist feud.
- 17 March: Hillcrest Bar bombing – Four Catholic civilians (including two children) were killed and twelve wounded when the UVF exploded a no-warning car bomb at the Hillcrest Bar on Donaghmore Road, Dungannon. The attack has been linked to the "Glenanne gang".
- 9 April: The UVF exploded a no-warning bomb at Divis Castle Bar on Springfield Road, Belfast. A Catholic civilian was killed.
- 9 April: The UVF exploded a no-warning bomb at Lenny's Bar on Railway Street, Armagh. A Catholic civilian was killed and fourteen others were wounded.
- 24 April: The UVF exploded a no-warning car bomb outside Shamrock Bar in Hilltown. A Catholic civilian was killed and at least two others wounded.
- 24 April: The UVF exploded a no-warning bomb at Ulster Bar in Warrenpoint. A Catholic civilian died of his wounds on 27 April. The bomb was detonated electronically.
- 2 May: The "Red Hand Commando" shot dead a Catholic civilian in Thistlecross, County Louth.
- 15 May: Charlemont pub attacks – The UVF carried out two attacks on pubs in Charlemont. A bomb attack on Clancy's Bar left three Catholic civilians dead and others wounded. Shortly after, a gun attack on the nearby Eagle Bar led to the death of another Catholic civilian and the wounding of many others. Locals claimed that the UDR had been patrolling the village for a number of nights beforehand, but were absent the night of the attacks. A UDR soldier was later convicted for taking part in the attacks, which have been linked to the "Glenanne gang".
- 15 May: Two more Catholic civilians were killed when the UVF exploded a bomb at Avenue Bar in Belfast.
- 27 May: The UVF shot dead a Catholic civilian at his home on Allworthy Avenue, Belfast.
- 2 June: The "Red Hand Commando" shot dead a Protestant civilian in Comber. A Catholic civilian was the intended target.
- 5 June: Three Catholic and two Protestant civilians were killed in a UVF gun attack on the Chlorane Bar on Gresham Street, Belfast.
- 5 June: The UVF launched a gun and bomb attack on the Rock Bar near Keady. Gunmen shot a Catholic civilian in the street outside, then fired at customers through the windows and threw a nail bomb inside, but it only partially exploded. The attack has been linked to the "Glenanne gang" – three RUC officers were convicted of carrying out the attack and a fourth was convicted for withholding knowledge about it.
- 5 June: A Catholic civilian was killed when the UVF exploded a bomb at International Bar in Portaferry.
- 18 June: The UVF exploded a no-warning bomb at Conway's Bar in Newtownabbey. A Catholic civilian was killed.
- 26 June: A Catholic civilian was found stabbed-to-death off Brookvale Street, Belfast. His father said the man had once been an Official IRA sympathizer but had never joined the organization. It is believed the UVF was responsible.
- 2 July: Six civilians were killed in a UVF gun attack on Ramble Inn on the Antrim–Ballymena Road near Antrim. The pub was targeted because it was owned by Catholics. Five of the dead were Protestant and one was Catholic.
- 25 July: The UVF shot dead a Catholic civilian at his home in Ardress. The attack has been linked to the "Glenanne gang".
- 29 July: The UVF exploded a no-warning bomb at Whitefort Inn on Andersonstown Road, Belfast. Three Catholic civilians were killed (one of whom died on 8 September) and 30 were wounded.
- 2 August: The "Shankill Butchers" kidnapped and killed a Catholic civilian in Belfast. He had been hacked-to-death with a hatchet and his body dumped on Manor Street.
- 16 August: The UVF exploded a no-warning car bomb outside the Step Inn in Keady. Two Catholic civilians were killed and 22 were wounded. The attack has been linked to the "Glenanne gang".
- 18 August: The UFF shot dead a UVF member and left his body on Flush Road, Belfast. Loyalist feud.
- 11 October: The UVF shot dead a Catholic civilian at his farm in Cornascriebe near Portadown.
- 9 October: A Catholic civilian was found beaten-to-death and on fire in Ballymena. He was left sixty yard from the shop where a Protestant civilian had died in a firebomb attack earlier that day. It is believed the UVF was responsible.
- 13 October: The UVF shot dead a Scottish man (Edward Donnelly born 25 Apr 1954, Hamilton) and left his body on Hemsworth Street, Belfast.
- 17 October: A Catholic civilian was found shot and beaten on Richmond Street, Belfast. He had been in a pub with links to loyalist paramilitaries. Detectives said his Fermanagh accent may have drawn attention and a witness said the murder was purely sectarian.
- 28 October: The "Red Hand Commando" and "Ulster Freedom Fighters" claimed responsibility for killing former Sinn Féin vice-president Máire Drumm. She was shot dead by gunmen dressed as doctors in Mater Hospital, Belfast. She had retired a short time before her killing and had been in the hospital for an operation. A UVF member (formerly a soldier), who worked as a security officer at the hospital, was among a number of men jailed.
- 30 October: The "Shankill Butchers" kidnapped and killed a Catholic civilian in Belfast. He had been beaten, shot, and his body dumped on Forthriver Road.
- 30 October: The UVF kidnapped and shot dead two Catholic civilians in Belfast. Their bodies were found on Glenbank Place.
- 5 November: The UVF shot a 15-year-old Catholic civilian as she stood outside a friend's home on Newington Street, Belfast. She died the following day. It is believed the UVF was responsible.
- 6 November: The UVF shot dead a Catholic civilian outside his workplace, a pub in Whiteabbey.
- 6 December: The UVF launched a gun attack on a Catholic-owned house at Mountainview Gardens, Belfast. Gunmen knocked at the door and, as a 14-year-old girl peered through the blinds, they opened fire. She died on 8 December. The house was in a mixed area.
- 20 December: The UVF killed a suspected UDA member on Forthriver Road, Belfast. Loyalist feud.

=== 1977 ===
- 31 January: The UVF beat-to-death a UDA member on Adela Street, Belfast. Loyalist feud.
- 3 February: The "Shankill Butchers" kidnapped and killed a Catholic civilian in Belfast. He had been beaten, his throat slashed, and his body dumped on Forthriver Road.
- 25 February: The UVF shot dead a Catholic RUC officer outside the RUC base in Cushendall. The attack has been linked to the "Glenanne gang".
- 27 February: Two UVF members died when their bomb prematurely exploded on Exchange Street, Belfast.
- 7 March: The UVF shot dead a Catholic civilian at his home in Craigavon.
- 25 March: A civilian from County Monaghan was killed by a UVF booby-trap bomb on his minibus in Greenisland.
- 30 March: The "Shankill Butchers" kidnapped and killed a Catholic civilian in Belfast. He had been shot, his throat slashed, and his body dumped in Highfern Gardens.
- 10 April: The "Shankill Butchers" exploded a bomb during a republican parade on Beechmount Avenue, Belfast. It killed a ten-year-old boy.
- 19 April: The UVF shot dead a Catholic civilian at his shop in Ahoghill. Two RUC Special Patrol Group officers were later convicted for taking part.
- 20 April: Two Catholic civilians were killed when the UVF exploded a bomb at the funeral of a Provisional IRA volunteer on Etna Drive, Belfast.
- 23 April: The UVF shot dead a Catholic civilian outside Legahory Inn, Craigavon.
- 3 May: The United Unionist Action Council (UUAC) strike began. Loyalist paramilitaries forcibly tried to stop many people going to work and to close any businesses that had opened.
- 10 May: An off-duty British Army UDR soldier was killed when the UVF exploded a bomb at a petrol station on Crumlin Road, Belfast. It was attacked for staying open during the loyalist strike.
- 10 May: The "Shankill Butchers" kidnapped and tortured a Catholic civilian in Belfast. He was found in an alleyway off the Shankill Road after the gang had beaten and stabbed him, and slashed his wrists. He was the first victim to survive such an attack.
- 13 May: The UUAC strike ended. The Royal Ulster Constabulary (RUC) reported that 3 people had been killed, 41 RUC officers injured, and 115 people charged with offences committed during the strike.

=== 1978 ===
- 11 February: Two Catholic civilians were killed when the UVF exploded a bomb at their home on Oldpark Avenue, Belfast.
- 8 March: The "Red Hand Commando" shot dead an Irish National Liberation Army volunteer and a Catholic civilian in Portadown.
- 14 April: The UVF shot dead a Protestant civilian at his home in Rathcoole.
- 17 June: A Catholic civilian was found beaten-to-death on a rubbish tip off Glencairn Road, Belfast. A detective said the motive was sectarian. It is believed the UVF was responsible.
- 8 September: The UVF shot dead a Protestant civilian in Lawnbrook Social Club, Belfast.

=== 1979 ===
- 17 February: Glasgow pub bombings – The UVF bombed two pubs frequented by Irish republicans in Glasgow, Scotland. The three pubs (Clelland, Derry Trainers, Old Barns) were wrecked and a number of people were wounded. It claimed the pubs were used for republican fundraising. In June, nine UVF members were convicted of the attacks.
- 20 February: Eleven members of the UVF known as the "Shankill Butchers" were sentenced to life in prison for 19 murders. The infamous group was named for their practice of torturing and mutilating their victims with butcher’s knives.
- 20 June: The UVF shot dead a Catholic civilian at his home on Bombay Street, Belfast.
- 28 July: The UVF shot dead a Catholic civilian on Obins Street, Portadown.
- 28 August: The UVF shot dead a Catholic civilian at his home on Ashton Street, Belfast.
- 1 September: The UVF shot dead a Catholic civilian in a shop on Antrim Road, Belfast.
- 12 September: The UVF shot dead a Catholic civilian at his home on Springfield Road, Belfast.
- 3 October: The UVF shot dead a Catholic civilian at her home on Rodney Drive, Belfast.
- 5 October: The UVF shot dead a Catholic civilian near his home in Camlough.
- 6 October: The UVF shot dead a Catholic civilian at the junction of Laganbank Road and Albertbridge Road, Belfast.

== 1980s ==
=== 1980 ===
- 2 February: The UVF shot dead a Catholic civilian on Rugby Avenue, Belfast.
- 29 February: The UVF shot dead a Catholic civilian on Clonard Street, Belfast.
- 2 April: The UVF shot dead a Catholic civilian on Leoville Avenue, Belfast.
- 30 December: The "Loyalist Prisoners Action Force" (believed to be a UVF covername) claimed responsibility for shooting dead an off-duty Prison Officer in Knocknagoney Park, Belfast.

=== 1981 ===
- 23 February: The UVF shot dead a Provisional IRA volunteer at his home on Rodney Drive, Belfast.
- 19 September: The UVF shot dead a Catholic civilian on Ormeau Road, Belfast.
- 15 October: The UVF shot dead a Catholic civilian at her home on Stewart Street, Belfast.
- 14 November: The UVF shot dead a Catholic civilian on Oldpark Avenue, Belfast.
- 15 November: The UVF shot dead a Catholic civilian on Thompson Street, Belfast.
- 17 November: The UVF shot dead a Catholic civilian in Lurgan.

=== 1982 ===
- 5 May: The UVF stabbed and shot dead a Protestant civilian during a robbery of her post office in Killinchy, County Down.
- 12 May: A Catholic civilian was killed in a UVF gun attack on a Catholic-owned shop on Antrim Road, Belfast.
- 16 July: Lenny Murphy (leader of the "Shankill Butchers") was released from prison.
- 17 July: Members of the "Shankill Butchers" beat-to-death a Protestant civilian with a learning disability at a Loyalist club. They dumped his body on waste ground near Alliance Road, Belfast.
- 5 September: The UVF shot dead one of its own members on Crimea Street, Belfast. Internal dispute.
- 30 September: The UVF shot dead a Catholic civilian in a petrol station on Ormeau Road, Belfast.
- 22 October: Lenny Murphy (leader of the "Shankill Butchers") and another UVF man kidnapped, tortured and killed a Catholic civilian in Belfast. His mutilated body was found behind a house on Brookmount Street nearly three days later.
- 24 October 1982: The "Protestant Action Force" claimed responsibility for killing a Catholic civilian in Belfast. He was kidnapped and beaten-to-death in an alley off Brookmount Street.
- 25 October: The "Protestant Action Force" claimed responsibility for shooting dead Sinn Féin activist Peter Corrigan in Armagh.
- 16 November: The Provisional IRA shot dead Lenny Murphy (leader of the "Shankill Butchers") on Forthriver Park, Belfast.
- 20 November: The "Protestant Action Force" claimed responsibility for shooting dead a Catholic civilian in Dundonald. This was claimed as retaliation for the killing of Lenny Murphy, one of the "Shankill Butchers". It vowed to kill another three Catholics to avenge his death.

=== 1983 ===
- 16 March: A UVF member was shot dead by the RUC while driving a stolen car on Elmwood Avenue, Belfast.
- 11 April: In a ‘supergrass’ trial in Belfast, 14 UVF members were jailed for a total of 200 years. Their convictions were quashed on 24 December 1984.
- 23 April: The "Protestant Action Force" claimed responsibility for exploding bomb in the Hole-in-the-Wall pub in Belfast, which was frequented by Catholics. There were no injuries.
- 30 April: The UVF shot dead a Protestant civilian in a robbery of a school on Pirrie Park, Belfast.
- 26 May: The UVF shot dead a Catholic civilian while he delivered milk on Elimgrove Street, Belfast.
- 29 October: The "Protestant Action Force" claimed responsibility for shooting dead civilian Workers' Party member David Nocher on Mill Road, Belfast.
- 8 November: The "Protestant Action Force" claimed responsibility for shooting dead a Catholic civilian in Armagh. In 1986, four members of the British Army's Ulster Defence Regiment – the "UDR Four" – were convicted of the murder.
- 24 November: A Protestant civilian was found shot dead at a building site in Broughshane. He had been kidnapped by the UVF in September 1982.
- 25 November: A Catholic civilian was beaten-to-death on Old Portadown Road in Lurgan after leaving an Irish National Foresters hall. It is believed the UVF was responsible.
- 5 December: The "Protestant Action Force" claimed responsibility for shooting dead an Irish National Liberation Army (INLA) volunteer in Newtownabbey.

=== 1984 ===
- 27 January: The UVF shot dead a Catholic civilian in Lurgan.
- 12 April: The UVF planted a time bomb on the windowsill of a Catholic-owned house on University Street, Belfast. A Catholic civilian was killed along with an RUC officer who had come to investigate.
- 17 May: The UVF shot and wounded Jim Campbell, then Northern editor of the Sunday World newspaper, at his home in north Belfast.
- 9 July: The UVF shot dead a Catholic civilian in the Millfield area of Belfast.
- 31 October: The "Protestant Action Force" claimed responsibility for shooting dead a Catholic civilian at his home on Mountainview Drive, Belfast.
- 23 November: The "Protestant Action Force" claimed responsibility for shooting dead civilian Sinn Féin member William McLaughlin in Newtownabbey.

=== 1985 ===
- 18 February: The UVF shot dead a Protestant civilian and left his body in a rubbish dump on Ballygomartin Road, Belfast.
- 1 June: The UVF shot dead one of its own members at Annadale Flats, Belfast. Internal dispute.

=== 1986 ===
- 14 January: The UVF shot dead a Catholic civilian at a Working Men's Club in Ligoniel, Belfast.
- 31 January: The UVF shot dead a Catholic civilian at his home on Bawnmore Park, Belfast.
- 15 March: The UVF beat-to-death a Catholic civilian behind a school on Ballysillan Road, Belfast.
- 7 May: The UVF shot dead a Protestant civilian at her home on Kilcoole Gardens, Belfast. Her Catholic husband was the intended target.
- 10 July: The "Protestant Action Force" claimed responsibility for shooting dead a Catholic civilian on Snugville Street, Belfast.
- 14 July: The "Protestant Action Force" claimed responsibility for shooting dead a Catholic civilian in Ligoniel, Belfast.
- 19 July: The "Protestant Action Force" claimed responsibility for shooting dead a Catholic civilian on Antrim Road, Belfast.
- 28 August: A Protestant civilian was found shot dead on waste ground behind Boys' Model School, off Ballysillan Road, Belfast. He was killed by the UVF, allegedly because it believed he was an informer.
- 14 September: The Provisional IRA shot dead UVF member John Bingham at his home on Ballysillan Crescent, Belfast.
- 16 September: A number of Ulster Unionist Party (UUP) and Democratic Unionist Party (DUP) politicians attended the funeral of leading UVF member John Bingham.
- 16 September: The "Protestant Action Force" claimed responsibility for shooting dead a Catholic civilian in the grounds of Holy Cross Roman Catholic Church on Crumlin Road, Belfast. This was claimed as retaliation for the killing of UVF member John Bingham two days before.
- 17 September: The "Protestant Action Force" claimed responsibility for shooting dead a Catholic civilian in Smithfield, Belfast.
- 15 November: The "Protestant Action Force" claimed responsibility for a 3–4 lb (1.4–1.8 kg) bomb a taxi driver was forced to take from the Shankill Road to North Queen street RUC barracks, Belfast. The device was neutralised by a British Army bomb disposal team.

=== 1987 ===
- 11 February: The UVF shot dead a Protestant civilian in Ballybogy.
- 2 April: The UVF shot dead a Provisional IRA volunteer at his home in Ardoyne, Belfast.
- 3 April: The UVF shot dead a Protestant civilian in a robbery on York Road, Belfast.
- 28 April: The Provisional IRA shot dead a UVF member as he stood outside the Progressive Unionist Party office on Shankill Road, Belfast.
- 7 May: The UVF shot dead a Catholic civilian at his home on Ormeau Road, Belfast.
- 25 June: The UVF shot dead a Catholic civilian at his home on Springfield Road, Belfast.
- 30 June: The UVF shot dead a Catholic civilian at his home on Wheatfield Drive, Belfast. He was living with a Protestant woman and her children.
- 7 November: The UVF injured three Catholic civilians in a gun attack on a bookmakers in Belfast.
- 11 November: Loyalist gunmen shot a Catholic civilian at his cafe Crumlin Road, Ardoyne, Belfast. He died five days later. No group claimed responsibility.

=== 1988 ===
- 15 January: The UVF shot dead a Catholic civilian at his home on Upper Meadow Street, Belfast.
- 15 May: Avenue Bar shooting – The "Protestant Action Force" claimed responsibility for a gun attack on Avenue Bar, Union Street, Belfast. Three Catholic civilians were killed.
- 12 June: The UVF shot dead a Catholic civilian outside his friend's home on Cavehill Road, Belfast. He worked for the Department of Environment and had been following his usual Sunday routine.
- 15 June: The Provisional IRA shot dead a UVF member at his shop on Woodstock Road, Belfast.
- 25 July: The UVF shot dead a Provisional IRA volunteer at his home on Friendly Way, Belfast.
- 8 August: The "Protestant Action Force" claimed responsibility for shooting dead two Catholic civilians in Belfast.
- 10 August: The UVF shot dead one of its own members and left his body in a field near Coleraine. Internal dispute.
- 17 August: The INLA shot dead an ex-UVF member at his shop on Shankill Road, Belfast.
- 18 August: The UVF shot dead a Catholic civilian on Cliftonville Road, Belfast.
- 24 November: The UVF shot dead a Catholic civilian in Coagh. He was at the home of his brother, who was a Sinn Féin member.

=== 1989 ===
- 18 January: The UVF shot dead a Catholic civilian (Ian Catney) at his workplace in Smithfield, Belfast. The UVF claimed he was a member of the INLA but this was "vigorously" denied by the INLA and his family. He had been wounded in an attack linked to the INLA-IPLO feud two years earlier, apparently by mistake.
- 9 February: The UVF shot dead a Catholic civilian in Smithfield, Belfast.
- 14 February: The UVF shot dead civilian Sinn Féin member John Davey at his home in Gulladuff.
- 10 March: The "Protestant Action Force" claimed responsibility for shooting dead a Catholic civilian security guard outside Orient Bar on Springfield Road, Belfast. Two other men were injured in the attack.
- 16 March: The Provisional IRA shot dead a UVF member at his home on Skegoneill Avenue, Belfast.
- 17 March: The UVF shot dead a Catholic civilian at his home in Glengormley.
- 19 March: The UVF shot dead a Catholic civilian at his home on Alliance Avenue, Belfast.
- 4 April: The UVF shot dead Provisional IRA volunteer Gerard Casey at his home in Rosnashane near Rasharkin. It is alleged by the Provisional IRA and Father Raymond Murray that the security forces were involved in the killing.
- 19 April: The UVF shot dead a Protestant civilian at Victoria Park/Park Avenue in Belfast. He was a nephew of loyalist supergrass Joe Bennett.
- 15 May: The UVF shot dead a Catholic civilian in Rathcoole.
- 15 May: The UVF fired an RPG-7 rocket during a gun and bomb attack on a Sinn Féin advice centre at Brompton Park, Ardoyne, Belfast. Four people were injured, none seriously. The group of gunmen fired on black taxis as they escaped in the van they had arrived in.
- 23 July: The "Protestant Action Force" claimed responsibility for shooting dead a Catholic civilian at his home on Fallswater Street, Belfast. It claimed he was a well-known republican activist.
- 2 September: The UVF shot dead a Catholic civilian on Crumlin Road, Belfast. Immediately afterward, one of the UVF men was shot dead by plain-clothed British Army soldiers.
- 29 November: A Provisional IRA volunteer and a Catholic civilian were killed in a UVF gun attack on Battery Bar in Moortown.

== 1990s ==
=== 1990 ===
- 7 January: The "Protestant Action Force", a covername for the UVF, claimed responsibility for shooting dead a Catholic civilian taxi driver. He was found dead in his car at Aghacommon, near Lurgan.
- 7 March: The UVF shot dead a former Provisional IRA volunteer in Lurgan, County Armagh, minutes after he left an RUC station. The RUC denied claims of collusion.
- 4 April: The UVF shot dead a former Provisional IRA volunteer (Roger Bradley) from County Londonderry in the Rathcoole area of Belfast. He was said to have severed his connections with the IRA on his release in the early '80s and was working as a plumber at the time of his death.
- 25 April: The UVF shot dead a Protestant civilian at Limehill Grove, Belfast. They believed he was a Catholic.
- 4 June: The UVF shot dead a Catholic civilian (Patrick Boyle) and injured his two sons at his home in Annaghmore. The UVF later said it had made a "mistake".
- 12 August: Three Chinese men were shot and injured in a UVF attack in a north Belfast takeaway restaurant.
- 20 September: The UVF claimed responsibility for an attempt on the life of a Sinn Féin councillor in Cookstown, County Tyrone.
- 6 October: The "Protestant Action Force" claimed responsibility for shooting dead a Catholic civilian at Oxford Island, County Armagh.
- 23 October: The Provisional IRA shot dead a UVF member outside Royal Victoria Hospital, Belfast.
- 24 October: The "Protestant Action Force" claimed responsibility for shooting dead a Catholic civilian taxi driver near Moy, County Tyrone. This was claimed as retaliation for the killing of Protestant taxi driver in Belfast.
- 26 October: The UVF shot dead Sinn Féin member Thomas Casey at a neighbour's home in Kildress, near Cookstown, County Tyrone.
- 6 November: The UVF was blamed for an arson attack which gutted the home of a Sinn Féin activist outside Cookstown, County Tyrone. Masked and armed men locked two women in a shed outside; it was the same house where Sinn Féin member Tomas Casey had been shot dead two weeks earlier.
- 7 November: The UVF shot dead a Catholic civilian at his home on Spamount Street, Belfast.
- 8 November: The UVF shot dead a Catholic civilian at his workplace in Stewartstown.
- 29 November: The UVF shot dead a Catholic civilian at his workplace on Duncairn Gardens, Belfast.
- 2 December: The UVF shot and injured a Catholic man at his home in Castlewellan, County Down.

=== 1991 ===
- 5 January: The UVF shot dead a Catholic civilian at his home in Magheralin.
- 24 February: The UVF shot dead a Catholic civilian at his home in Bawnmore Park, Belfast.
- 3 March: The UVF shot dead three Provisional IRA volunteers and a Catholic civilian outside Boyle's Bar in Cappagh. The volunteers arrived in a car as a UVF gang waited in ambush. The UVF fired at the car (killing the volunteers) then fired through the window of the pub (killing the civilian).
- 4 March: The UVF shot dead a Catholic taxi driver in his car on Heather Street, Belfast.
- 18 March: A Catholic civilian was found stabbed-to-death behind a leisure centre at Warren Park, Lisburn. He had been stabbed 62 times. It is believed the UVF was responsible.
- 28 March: The "Protestant Action Force" claimed responsibility for shooting dead three Catholic civilians in an attack on a mobile shop in Craigavon. This was claimed as retaliation for the alleged shooting and wounding of a Protestant woman.
- 19 April: A Catholic taxi driver was shot and wounded by the UVF at Belfast Castle, north Belfast.
- 29 April: The Combined Loyalist Military Command (CLMC) (acting on behalf of all loyalist paramilitaries) announced a ceasefire lasting until 4 July. This was to coincide with political talks between the four main parties (the Brooke-Mayhew talks).
- 16 June: The UVF shot and injured a Catholic man at Unity Flats, Belfast. He had been acquitted of involvement in the assassination attempt targeting Thomas Travers in 1983.
- 19 July: The UVF shot dead a Catholic taxi driver in his car on Divis Street, Belfast.
- 10 August: The "Loyalist Retaliation and Defence Group" (believed to be a UVF or RHC covername) claimed responsibility for shooting dead a Catholic civilian at his shop on Donegall Road, Belfast. It was targeted for selling republican newsletter An Phoblacht.
- 16 August: The UVF shot dead a leading member (Martin "Rook" O'Prey) of the Irish People's Liberation Organisation (IPLO) at his home on Ardmoulin Terrace, Belfast. His seven-year-old daughter was injured.
- 24 August: The UVF beat-to-death a Catholic civilian and left his body in the River Lagan by Queen's Road, Lisburn.
- 10 September: The Provisional IRA shot dead a UVF member at his home on Donegall Road, Belfast.
- 13 September: The UVF shot dead a Catholic civilian at his home on Ligoniel Road, Belfast.
- 28 September: The "Loyalist Retaliation and Defence Group" (believed to be a UVF or RHC covername) claimed responsibility for shooting dead a Catholic civilian at his shop on St James Road, Belfast. It was targeted for selling republican newsletter An Phoblacht.
- 13 October: The UVF shot dead a former Irish National Liberation Army (INLA) volunteer on Ormeau Road, Belfast.
- 25 October: The UVF shot dead a former Provisional IRA volunteer at his home in Pomeroy.
- 14 November: The UVF shot dead two Catholic civilians and a Protestant civilian at the Carbet Road-Carn Road junction near Craigavon. The men were shot in their car after being stopped at an illegal UVF checkpoint. The UVF later apologised for killing the Protestant man.
- 24 November: A UVF & a UFF prisoner was killed when the Provisional IRA exploded a bomb in a dining hall of Crumlin Road Prison, Belfast.

=== 1992 ===
- 3 January: The UVF shot dead two Catholic civilians at their shop in Moy.
- 24 February: The UVF stabbed-to-death a Catholic civilian and left her body on Ballarat Street, Belfast.
- 4 March: A UVF sniper shot dead a Catholic civilian while driving his lorry in Cornascriebe, near Portadown.
- 29 March: The UVF shot dead a Catholic civilian at his home on Bann Street, Portadown.
- 1 April: The UVF shot dead a Protestant civilian at his home in Lurgan. It claimed he was an informer.
- 29 April: The UVF shot dead an Irish People's Liberation Organisation (IPLO) member at his workplace on Conneywarren Lane, Belfast.
- 13 May: The UVF shot a Catholic workman in north Belfast. It may have been a case of mistaken identity.
- 5 July: A Catholic civilian was found beaten-to-death on North Howard Street, Belfast. The court heard that two rival groups of men had been taunting each other in the area. It is believed UVF members were responsible.
- 5 September: The UVF shot dead a Protestant civilian on Solway Street, Belfast. It claimed he was a criminal.
- 7 September: The UVF shot dead two Catholic civilians at their home near Moy.
- 9 October: The "Red Hand Commando" shot dead a Protestant civilian on Mersey Street, Belfast. It claimed he was an informer.
- 16 October: The UVF shot dead Sinn Féin member civilian Sheena Campbell in York Hotel, Belfast.
- 16 October: The UVF left an incendiary device at the office of the Sunday World in Belfast.
- 19 November: The UVF shot dead a Catholic civilian and injured three others in a gun attack on Thierafurth Inn, Kilcoo.
- 20 November: A Catholic workman was hurt by a UVF bomb at a building site in Coleraine.
- 23 November: Sunday World journalist Martin O'Hagan was forced to leave Northern Ireland following UVF threats.
- 13 December: The UVF fired a rocket at Crumlin Road Prison in Belfast. It was aimed at the canteen used by republican prisoners, but missed its target. The rocket attack was presumably a retaliation for the bombing of the Loyalist wing of the prison in November 1991.
- 20 December: The UVF shot dead a Catholic civilian at his home on Upper Crumlin Road, Belfast.

=== 1993 ===
- 1 January: The "Red Hand Commando" claimed responsibility for shooting two Catholic civilians on Manor Street, Belfast. The two men were cleaning a car when they were shot at from a passing vehicle. The RHC claimed it was retaliation for the killing of a British soldier in the area two days before.
- 3 January: The UVF shot dead two Catholic civilians at their shop in Lisnagleer near Dungannon. Patrick Shields, killed with his son Diarmuid, was said by the writer Ed Moloney to have been a member of the IRA in the 1970s, but had long since left. A month later, Diarmuid Shields' girlfriend committed suicide because she was unable to come to terms with his death.
- 17 January: The UVF shot dead a Catholic civilian at a house on Shore Road, Belfast.
- 28 January: A Catholic civilian was killed by a UVF booby-trap bomb in a house he was renovating at Kildress. The owner of the house was the intended target.
- 28 January: A UVF attack on a North Belfast taxi firm was abandoned and instead they shot a man in a chip shop nearby.
- 2 February: The UVF shot dead a Catholic civilian at his home in Ballyronan.
- 11 February: The UVF shot dead a Catholic civilian at his home on Derrymagown Road near Loughgall.
- 17 February: The UVF shot and wounded a Catholic civilian at his workplace in south Belfast. He had survived a similar attack two years earlier.
- 23 March: A Catholic workman injured by a UVF bomb in north Belfast.
- 30 March: The UVF planted a bomb under a car in the Rathenraw estate near Antrim. A British Army officer lost his hand while trying to defuse it.
- 7 May: The "Red Hand Commando" carried out an arson attack on a GAA club at Ballycran, County Down.
- 29 May: The UVF attempted to kill a Catholic man in the Short Strand area of Belfast, who escaped. The man named by the UVF was not the man targeted in the murder attempt.
- 30 May: The UVF claimed responsibility for an incendiary bomb left at the Belfast home of former SDLP councillor Brian Feeney. It was defused by the British Army.
- 30 May: The "Red Hand Commando" shot dead a Catholic civilian at his home in Dundonald, County Down.
- 7 June: A Sinn Féin election worker escaped injury in a UVF attack at his home in Castlewellan, County Down.
- 15 June: Six parcel bombs were posted to Catholics; one living in County Armagh and the rest in Belfast. One of the devices exploded after falling from a conveyor at Post Office HQ in Belfast.
- 20 June: The UVF claimed responsibility for attacks on the homes of prison officers in the Belfast area.
- 22 June: The RUC intercepted and arrested two armed UVF members in a hijacked vehicle in the Ligoniel area of North Belfast.
- 26 June: Loyalists rioted when the RUC prevented an Orange Order march near a peace line in the Springfield area of Belfast. On Ainsworth Avenue, a UVF member, Brian McCallum, was wounded when the grenade he was holding exploded prematurely. Eighteen people were wounded. He died three days later.
- 2 July: The UVF orchestrated riots and vehicle hijackings across Belfast, Bangor and Lurgan following the funeral of UVF member Brian McCallum. who died several days earlier. Forty buses and cars were burned, there were nine fire bombings, and twenty-eight gun attacks on the RUC; many of them after luring officers to Loyalist areas with hoax calls.
- 2 July: The UVF claimed responsibility for shooting a Sinn Féin election worker at Hollywell Hospital, Antrim.
- 9 July: The UVF abandoned a hijacked taxi containing a suspect device in Tamar Street, Belfast. The device was defused by the British Army.
- 15 July: The UVF issued a statement admitting sole responsibility for the Dublin and Monaghan bombings of 17 May 1974.
- 30 July: A Catholic civilian survived a Loyalist shooting in Lisburn when the first bullet struck a coin in his pocket and the gun then jammed.
- 30 July: The UVF left a bomb at a home in East Belfast.
- 4 August: Three Catholic workmen were treated for shock after a grenade was lobbed at their van in an industrial estate in Antrim, County Antrim.
- 10 August: UVF parcel bombs injured several people in County Down, including a Catholic woman in Hilltown and a Sinn Féin activist.
- 10 August: The "Red Hand Commando" carried out an arson attack on a GAA club at Portaferry, County Down.
- 11 August: A Catholic civilian was found beaten-to-death on wasteground off Sherbrook Way, Belfast. He had suffered brain damage in a sectarian attack six years before. He was killed 700 yards from Mater Hospital with a brick and a plank with nails in it. It is believed the UVF was responsible.
- 24 August: UVF firebombs were defused at bus depots in Dundalk, County Louth and in Dublin.
- 25 August: The "Red Hand Commando" announced that it would attack bars or hotels where Irish folk music is played. Following widespread criticism the RHC withdrew the threat a day later.
- 1 September: The "Red Hand Commando" claimed responsibility for shooting two Catholic civilians in Shore Crescent, Belfast.
- 1 September: The UVF shot dead a Catholic civilian at his workplace on Chadolly Street, Belfast.
- 1 September: The UVF shot dead a prison officer at his home on Joanmount Park, Belfast. The UVF also carried out gun and arson attacks on the homes of several other prison officers. It threatened to kill more prison officers unless there were improvements in conditions for loyalist prisoners.
- 6 September: The UVF wounded a Protestant man in east Belfast.
- 8 September: The UVF tried to kill a Catholic civilian near Cookstown, County Tyrone.
- 13 September: The "Red Hand Commando" shot dead a former Loyalist prisoner in an internal dispute in Carrowdore, County Down.
- 15 September: A UVF bomb was defused outside a Sinn Féin centre in north Belfast.
- 4 October: A Catholic man was seriously wounded in a UVF attack as he left his work in a mainly Protestant estate in Antrim.
- 5 October: A UVF parcel bomb addressed to the Irish Minister for Foreign Affairs, Dick Spring, was defused by the British Army at the postal sorting office in Belfast.
- 6 October: The UVF "raked" two houses with gunfire in the Nationalist Bawnmore area of North Belfast.
- 6 October: The UVF planted a car bomb outside the Sinn Féin press center in west Belfast. It failed to explode.
- 12 October: The UVF shot dead a Catholic civilian as he drove his van to work on Sydenham Road, Belfast. Four of his co-workers were injured.
- 12 October: The UVF wounded a Catholic civilian in a gun attack in North Belfast.
- 19 October: A Catholic man escaped injury in Lurgan, County Armagh after his UVF assailant's gun jammed.
- 24 October: The UVF claimed to have aborted an attack on the home of a Sinn Féin member in the Antrim area.
- 25 October: The UVF claimed responsibility for shooting dead a Catholic civilian at his home in Newtownabbey. It stated that its members had spent over an hour interrogating him beforehand.
- 28 October: The UVF shot dead two Catholic brothers (Gerrard Cairns, 22, and Rory Cairns, 18) at their home in front of their eleven-year-old sister in Bleary, County Down.
- 5 November: A UVF bomb inside a chocolate box addressed to a north Belfast taxi firm was discovered in Belfast's central sorting office and defused.
- 14 November: A UVF attempt to kill a Catholic man failed when the attacker's gun jammed in Parkhall Road, Antrim town
- 24 November: Weapons being shipped to the UVF were intercepted by British police at Teesport, England. It included 300 assault rifles, thousands of bullets, 4,400 pounds of explosives, and detonators, and had originated in Poland.
- 30 November: The UVF fired numerous shots at the home of Sinn Féin councillor Bobby Lavery near the New Lodge area of Belfast.

=== 1994 ===
- 4 January: The UVF sent two parcel bombs to Sinn Féin's offices at Parnell Square, Dublin. An Irish army bomb disposal expert lost a thumb trying to defuse both devices.
- 7 January: The UVF claimed responsibility for a bomb discovered at a home on Charlemont Road, Moy, County Armagh. The device was defused by British security forces.
- 13 January: The UVF claimed responsibility for a video cassette bomb planted at a house under renovation in South Street, Portadown. The device was defused by the British Army.
- 25 January: The UVF claimed responsibility for exploding a video cassette bomb at the home of a Catholic family in Lurgan, injuring two of the family members.
- 27 January: The UVF shot dead a Catholic civilian and wounded his wife at their home in Ballymena.
- 1 February: The UVF exploded a bomb at the home of a Catholic family in Portadown. An RUC officer was wounded.
- 3 February: The UVF fired shots at a minibus used by relatives of Republican prisoners in Belfast. The driver and a passerby were both wounded.
- 3 February: The UVF murdered a Catholic civilian (Mark Sweeney) who was found shot in his car on Ballyreagh Road, Newtownards, County Down.
- 12 February: A Catholic woman was injured by a booby-trap bomb in a traffic cone in Craigavon, County Armagh.
- 17 February: The "Red Hand Commando" shot dead a Catholic civilian in a house on Skegoneill Avenue, Belfast.
- 20 February: The UVF attempted to kill a Catholic man, who they claimed was an IRA member, in the Ballyoran area of Portadown.
- 21 February: The UVF claimed responsibility for an attack on the home of a prison officer in East Belfast.
- 26 February: The UVF claimed responsibility for a bomb attack on Sinn Féin party headquarters in Derry. The device was discovered and moved to waste ground where it exploded harmlessly.
- 27 February: The UVF claimed responsibility for a failed bomb attack on the home of a Catholic man in the Andersontown area of Belfast.
- 11 March: A Catholic civilian was killed when a UVF booby-trap bomb exploded under his lorry in Portadown.
- 22 March: The UVF claimed responsibility for a gun attack on a butcher's shop in the Markets area of Belfast. The UVF claimed their intended target escaped.
- 31 March: The UVF shot and seriously injured a Catholic man at his home in Antrim in what police believed was a case of mistaken identity.
- 7 April: A Protestant woman was beaten and then shot dead by a group of men at a house on Donegal Avenue, Belfast. The men, who were members of the "Red Hand Commando", assumed the woman was a Catholic.
- 12 April: The UVF shot dead one of its own members, claiming he was involved in the killing of 7 April.
- 12 April: The UVF and UDA issued a joint statement that they won't stop their attacks until nationalists accept Northern Ireland's position within the UK.
- 20 April: The UVF critically injured a Catholic man in a shooting at an erotic book shop in Gresham Street, Belfast.
- 28 April: The UVF shot dead a Catholic, James Brown, in his shop on Garmoyle Street, Belfast. Former IRA member Gerry Bradley subsequently wrote that in the 1970s Brown had been the second-in-command of the IRA in Belfast. His family denied the allegation.
- 8 May: The UVF shot dead a Catholic civilian at a house on Cullenramer Road, near Dungannon. It has been alleged that her nephew was the target. Her nephew had served a jail sentence for possession of explosives. On 27 July 1994, a neighbour discovered, in a nearby field, two security force surveillance cameras pointing at the house. There were subsequent claims of collusion between the security forces and UVF, and an inquest was ordered in 2009.
- 16 May The UVF shot a Catholic deliveryman in the Woodvale area of north Belfast.
- 16 May: The UVF claimed responsibility for a pipe bomb attack on the home of a Catholic man in Derry.
- 17 May: The UVF shot dead two Catholic civilians on a building site on North Queen Street, Belfast.
- 18 May: The UVF opened fire on a crowded taxi depot on Lower English Street, Armagh. Two Catholic civilians were killed.
- 21 May: A UVF team shot dead Provisional IRA volunteer Martin Doherty as he attempted to prevent them from leaving The Widow Scallans Bar, Pearse Street, Dublin after they had planted a bomb which subsequently failed to detonate properly. A Sinn Féin meeting was taking place at the time. Another man was wounded in the attack.
- 22 May: The UVF planted a bomb in the Sinn Féin office in Newry. The device failed to explode.
- 23 May: The UVF exploded a bomb at the Sinn Féin office in Belfast City Hall. Two workmen were wounded.
- 9 June: The UVF claimed responsibility for shooting dead a Catholic civilian at his workplace, Harland and Wolff shipyard, Belfast.
- 10 June: The UVF claimed responsibility for bombing the home of the mother of a Sinn Féin councillor in Armagh.
- 15 June: The UVF claimed responsibility for a bomb defused outside the Sinn Féin office on the Falls Road, Belfast.
- 16 June: Three UVF members were shot dead by the INLA on Shankill Road, Belfast.
- 17 June: The UVF shot dead a Catholic civilian taxi driver in Carrickfergus.
- 17 June: The UVF shot dead two Protestant civilians at a building site in Newtownabbey. They were believed to be Catholics.
- 18 June: Loughinisland massacre – The UVF opened fire on a crowd gathered in the Heights bar in Loughinisland. Six Catholic civilians were killed and five were wounded. There have been allegations of security force collusion.
- 2 August: A meeting was held by representatives of the UVF and UFF. At that meeting it was decided that loyalist paramilitaries would continue attacking Catholic civilians regardless of any future Provisional IRA ceasefire.
- 5 August: A Protestant civilian was found shot dead on Ballyhill Lane near Crumlin. The UVF were believed to be responsible.
- 7 August: The UVF shot dead a Catholic civilian, who was pregnant, at her home in Greencastle, County Tyrone.
- 20 August: The UVF attached a bomb to the car of a Catholic businessman in Newcastle, County Down. The UVF claimed the attack was aborted because of the presence of women and children, however security forces believed the "sophisticated" device malfunctioned.
- 20 August: The UVF planted a bomb outside a pub on Cromac Street, Belfast. No one was injured in the explosion.
- 23 August: The "Red Hand Commando" shot and seriously injured a Protestant workman, mistaken for a Catholic, in Rathcoole in Newtownabbey, County Antrim.
- 31 August: The UVF kidnapped and shot dead a Catholic civilian in County Antrim. His body was found in a car off Old Ballynoe Road, near Antrim.
- 31 August: The Provisional IRA announced a ceasefire.
- 1 September: A UVF unit tried to kill a leading member of the IRA who was drinking in a pub in central Belfast, but their gun jammed.
- 4 September: The UVF exploded a car bomb near a Sinn Féin office on Falls Road, Belfast.
- 10 September: The UVF planted a 3 lb (1.4 kg) booby-trap bomb at the home of a Sinn Féin councillor in County Londonderry.
- 12 September: The UVF planted a 1.5 kg bomb on the Belfast–Dublin train. It partially exploded as the train neared Dublin Connolly railway station, wounding two people.
- 23 September: The UVF tried to kill the INLA Chief of Staff, Hugh Torney in the Lower Falls area of Belfast. UVF gunmen held his family hostage but Torney failed to appear.
- 13 October: The Combined Loyalist Military Command (CLMC) issued a statement which announced a ceasefire on behalf of all loyalist paramilitaries, noting that the "permanence of our cease-fire will be completely dependent upon the continued cessation of all nationalist/republican violence".

=== 1995 ===
- 14 March: Prison officers at Maze Prison carried out searches for "illicit material" which sparked rioting by 150 UVF prisoners.
- 28 September: The "Red Hand Commando" shot dead one of its own members in Bangor. An internal dispute was involved.

=== 1996 ===
- 3 March: The UVF was responsible for a bomb scare at Dublin Airport which caused significant disruption. It was a response to the IRA breaking their ceasefire the previous month.
- 21 March: The UVF shot dead one of its own members in Towers Tavern, Ballymena. Internal dispute.
- 7 July: Members of a Portadown-based UVF unit shot dead a Catholic taxi driver and then burnt his car in Aghagallon. It was thought to be a response to the Drumcree parade dispute. On 2 August 1996, the UVF stood-down the "breakaway unit" that had killed the taxi driver. This unit, led by Billy Wright, would become the Loyalist Volunteer Force (LVF).
- 29 October: The UVF shot dead one of its own members on Benview Avenue, Belfast. Internal dispute.

=== 1997 ===
- 3 March: A bomb was found outside a Sinn Féin office in Monaghan, Republic of Ireland. The bomb was defused by the Irish Army. It is thought UVF members were to blame.
- 18 May: A Catholic civilian was found beaten-to-death on Mount Vernon Walk, Belfast. It is thought UVF members were to blame.
- 8 July: Amid widespread Nationalist riots in Belfast, Derry and other cities across Northern Ireland, triggered by the Drumcree parade dispute, the UVF and UDA staged a joint "show of strength" which was recorded and broadcast by Ulster Television. They claimed that the display was intended to "reassure and calm Protestants". A UDA member was killed when the pipe bomb he was handling exploded prematurely.
- 13 September: Loyalists held a parade on Belfast's Shankill Road with 70 bands taking part. Four UVF members appeared during the parade and posed with weapons before slipping away into the crowd.
- 26 September: A UDA member was found beaten to death at Kiltonga Nature Reserve near Newtownards in County Down. He had been missing since 19 August 1997. It is thought he was killed by UVF members as part of a loyalist feud.
- 25 October: A Protestant civilian was killed by a booby-trap bomb on his car as he drove through Bangor. It is thought to have been part of a loyalist feud.
- 9 November: A Protestant civilian was found beaten-to-death in a quarry near Newtownabbey, County Antrim. It is thought he was killed by UVF members as part of a loyalist feud.
- 27 November: Jackie Mahood, an ex-PUP politician, was shot and wounded at his taxi depot in north Belfast, apparently as part of a loyalist feud.

=== 1998 ===
- 3 July: The UVF shot dead one of its former members at his home in Bangor. Internal dispute.
- 12 July: Jason (aged 8), Mark (aged 9) and Richard Quinn (aged 10) were burnt-to-death when loyalists firebombed their home in Ballymoney. The attack was likely a response to the Drumcree parade dispute. The boys' mother was a Catholic and the house was in a mainly Protestant area. It is thought UVF members were to blame.

=== 1999 ===
- 17 March: The UVF shot dead a member of the "Red Hand Commando". Internal dispute.

== 2000s ==
=== 2000 ===
- 10 January: The LVF shot dead a UVF member on Derrylettiff Road near Portadown. Loyalist feud.
- 19 February: Two Protestant civilians were found stabbed to death on Druminure Road near Tandragee. It was revealed that the UVF were to blame and that the killings were part of a loyalist feud, although the victims had not been part of any paramilitary group.
- 26 May: The LVF shot dead a UVF member at Silverstream Park, Belfast. Loyalist feud.
- 12 July: The UDA shot dead a UVF member attending "Eleventh night" celebrations in Larne. Loyalist feud.
- 21 August: The UVF shot dead two men one a UDA member and the other a UVF member sitting in a jeep on Crumlin Road, Belfast. Loyalist feud.
- 23 August: The UFF shot dead a UVF member on Summer Street, Belfast. Loyalist feud.
- 28 October: The UVF shot dead a UDA member on Mountcollyer Street, Belfast. Loyalist feud.
- 31 October: The UDA shot dead a Progressive Unionist Party (PUP) member on Canning Street, Belfast. Loyalist feud.
- 31 October: The UVF shot dead Tommy English, a UDA member, in Newtownabbey. Loyalist feud.
- 1 November: The UDA shot dead a UVF member in Newtownabbey. Loyalist feud.
- 15 December: The UVF and UDA issued a statement to announce an "open-ended and all-encompassing cessation of hostilities". This marked the end of the loyalist feud which had begun in July.

=== 2001 ===
- 14 March: The UVF shot dead an LVF member in Conlig. Loyalist feud.
- 11 April: The LVF shot dead a UVF member in Tandragee. He was also a member of the Orange Order. Loyalist feud.

=== 2002 ===
- 13 September: The "Red Hand Commando" shot dead an LVF member in Newtownards. Loyalist feud.

=== 2003 ===
- 8 May: A member of the "Red Hand Commando" was shot dead in Crawfordsburn. Loyalist feud.
- 8 November: A Protestant man died a few hours after being shot in a UVF "punishment attack" in Ballyclare.

=== 2004 ===
- 18 May: The UVF shot dead an LVF member on Alanbrooke Road, Belfast. Loyalist feud.
- 22 May: The UVF was blamed for a bomb attack which extensively damaged two houses in Bloomsfield Court off the Beersbridge Road in east Belfast.
- 23 May: The UVF was blamed for a blast bomb which exploded outside a house in Evelyn Avenue, Beersbridge Road, Belfast.
- 27 May: The UVF was blamed for a bomb attack at a house in Glenlea Park in Holywood, County Down. Loyalist feud.

=== 2005 ===
- 1 July: The UVF shot dead a Protestant man in his lorry on Lower Newtownards Road, Belfast. Believed to be part of a loyalist feud.
- 11 July: The UVF shot dead a Protestant man at Dhu Varren Park, Belfast. Believed to be part of a loyalist feud.
- 31 July: The UVF shot dead a Protestant man on Wheatfield Crescent, Belfast. Believed to be part of a loyalist feud.
- 15 August: The UVF shot dead a Protestant man on Sandy Row, Belfast. Believed to be part of a loyalist feud.
- 10–12 September: The UVF and UDA orchestrated large-scale rioting in Belfast and several towns in County Antrim after the Orange Order Whiterock parade was re-routed to avoid the Irish nationalist Springfield Road area. UVF and the UDA members opened fire with automatic weapons on the British Army and PSNI.(See: 2005 Belfast riots)

=== 2007 ===
- 3 May: The UVF and Red Hand Commando issued a statement declaring an end to its armed campaign. The statement noted that they would retain their weapons but put them "beyond reach".

=== 2009 ===
- 27 June: The UVF and Red Hand Commando state that all of their weapons and explosives have been decommissioned and put "totally and irreversibly beyond use".

== 2010s ==
=== 2010 ===
- 28 May: Bobby Moffet, who had links with the UVF and RHC, was shot dead by two gunmen on the Shankill Road in Belfast on a busy Friday afternoon. The Independent Monitoring Commission (IMC) claimed that the UVF were responsible for the killing. It is thought that Moffet was in a personal feud with a leading UVF member in west Belfast. The IMC concluded that the murder did not violate the UVF ceasefire but put their 2009 claims of weapons decommissioning under scrutiny.

=== 2011 ===
- 20–22 June: 2011 Northern Ireland riots – The East Belfast UVF were blamed by the PSNI for orchestrating attacks on Catholic homes in the nationalist Short Strand enclave in East Belfast. Alleged UVF members from Pitt Park exchanged gunfire with republicans in the Short Strand.

=== 2012 ===
- 6 January: UVF members were blamed for assaulting and seriously injuring a Catholic teenager involved in the making of a film in South Belfast.
- 18 February: Suspected UDA members were blamed for attempting to shoot dead the East Belfast UVF leader Stephen 'Mackers' Matthews in a row over his involvement in the drugs trade.
- 9 March: East Belfast UVF members were blamed for exploding two bombs on the property of a man they had given death threats to in East Belfast. No one was injured. The leader of the East Belfast UVF was arrested in connection with the incident.
- 2–4 September: 2012 North Belfast riots – The PSNI claimed that UVF members took part in the nights of violence between loyalists and republicans which left over 60 PSNI officers injured.
- 10 October: Prosecutors revealed that 26 incidents—including death threats, criminal damage, assaults, and discharge of firearms—in the Ballycraigy estate were linked to a new loyalist feud between UVF and LVF members.
- 3 December: 2012-2013 Northern Ireland protests – In the aftermath of a vote to fly the Union flag only on designated days at Belfast City Hall. The UVF were blamed for playing a large role in the weeks of violence following the decision in Belfast and across Northern Ireland, targeting PSNI officers, Catholic homes in East Belfast (East Belfast UVF blamed) and Alliance Party offices. Leaving over 150 PSNI officers injured in riots across Northern Ireland, and the riots continued into January 2013.

=== 2013 ===
- 20 May: The National Union of Journalists revealed that the UVF issued death threats to two journalists from Northern Ireland, and a third from the Republic of Ireland after they had written an article about a UVF controlled drinking den in South Belfast where a young Catholic woman and her Protestant friends were beaten up. The death threats were condemned by the PUP.
- 3 October: The policing board announced that the UVF was still heavily involved in gangsterism despite its ceasefire. Assistant chief constable Drew Harris in a statement said "The UVF are subject to an organized crime investigation as an organized crime group. The UVF very clearly have involvement in drug dealing, all forms of gangsterism, serious assaults, intimidation of the community." The announcement came one month after the UVF were blamed for seriously wounding a 24-year-old care worker, Jemma McGrath, in East Belfast after shooting her five times.

=== 2019 ===
- 27 January: Ian Ogle, a spokesman for the loyalist community, was beaten and stabbed to death at Cluan place, Belfast. The PSNI reported that one line of investigation involved members of the East Belfast UVF.
- 19 February: David Murphy, a former member of the UVF, was shot twice with a shotgun and killed near his house at Glenholme Farm, Glenwerry, County Antrim.

== 2020s ==
=== 2021 ===
- 4 March: The UDA, UVF, and Red Hand Commando renounced their current participation in the Good Friday Agreement in a letter to Prime Minister Boris Johnson.
- 11 April: Following a week of rioting in Loyalist communities, the UVF reportedly ordered the removal of Catholic families from a housing estate in Carrickfergus.
- 1 November: A bus was hijacked and burnt by armed men in Abbot Drive in Newtownards, County Down. Police blamed a local faction of the UVF.

=== 2022 ===
- 25 March: The UVF was blamed for a proxy bomb attack targeting a "peace-building" event in Belfast where Irish Foreign Minister Simon Coveney was speaking. Armed men hijacked a van on the Shankill Road, Belfast, and forced the driver to take a device to a church on the Crumlin Road. The community centre hosting the event and 25 nearby homes were evacuated and a funeral was disrupted. A controlled explosion was carried out and the bomb was later declared a hoax.
- 26 March: The UVF was linked to a hoax bomb alert at a bar in Warrenpoint, County Down.

=== 2023 ===
- 8 November: Two men were arrested for drug offences as part of an investigation into East Belfast UVF drug criminality.
- 12 November: The leadership of the East Belfast UVF was stood down by the organisation's central hierarchy. Up to eight individuals were removed from their positions.

=== 2024 ===
- 15 June: The UVF conducted a "show of strength" at a commemoration parade for Robert Seymour: approximately 1,500 people, many in uniform and bussed in from other areas, lined the road during the parade in a public display of support for the UVF and the new leadership in the area.
- 24 September: The Loyalist Communities Council, including representatives from the UVF, met with the Minister of Education, Paul Given, to discuss a proposal to build an Irish language school in east Belfast.

== See also ==
- Timeline of Red Hand Commando actions
- Timeline of Ulster Defence Association actions
- Timeline of Loyalist Volunteer Force actions
- Timeline of Orange Volunteers actions
