= Irish car bomb =

Irish car bomb may refer to:

- Car bombs on the island of Ireland, including:
  - Proxy bombs
  - Bombings in Northern Ireland:
    - 1998 Banbridge bombing
    - Benny's Bar bombing
    - Bloody Friday (1972)
    - Claudy bombing
    - Attack on Cloghoge checkpoint
    - 1973 Coleraine bombings
    - 1970 Crossmaglen bombing
    - Donegall Street bombing
    - Forensic Science Laboratory bombing
    - Glenanne barracks bombing
    - Hillcrest Bar bombing
    - Murder of Ronan Kerr
    - Lisburn van bombing
    - 2010 Newry car bombing
    - Omagh bombing
    - Battle at Springmartin
    - Thiepval barracks bombing
    - Warrenpoint ambush
  - In the Republic of Ireland:
    - Belturbet bombing
    - Castleblayney bombing
    - Donnelly's Bar and Kay's Tavern attacks
    - Dublin and Monaghan bombings
    - 1972 and 1973 Dublin bombings
- Irish car bomb (cocktail), a drink made with Irish cream, Irish whiskey and Irish stout

== See also ==
- Car bomb (disambiguation)
