= RTÉ Studio bombing =

Terrorist attack on Irish broadcasting studios (1969)

- Part of The Troubles
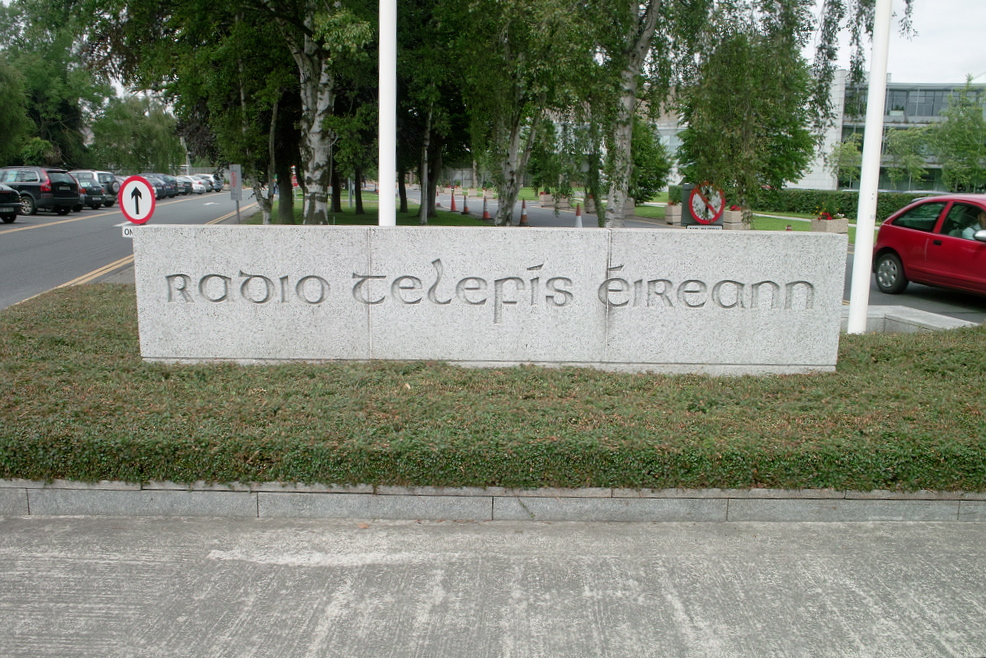
- RTÉ campus entrance in Donnybrook, Dublin
- Location: Raidió Teilifís Éireann studios, Donnybrook, Dublin, Ireland
- Date: 5 August 1969; 1:30 am
- Attack type: Time bomb (plastic)
- Deaths: 0
- Injuries: 0
- Perpetrators: Ulster Volunteer Force (UVF); Ulster Protestant Volunteers (UPV)

The RTÉ Studio bombing was a 1969 bomb attack carried out by the Ulster Loyalist paramilitary group the Ulster Volunteer Force (UVF) in Dublin, Ireland. It was the first Loyalist bombing in the Republic of Ireland during the Troubles.

== Background ==
In March and April 1969 the UVF and Ulster Protestant Volunteers (UPV) carried out a number of sabotage bombings in and around Belfast and blamed them on the Irish Republican Army (IRA) in an attempt to get rid of the current Northern Ireland Stormont government who hardline Loyalists felt was too liberal towards Irish nationalism.

== Bombing ==
The attack took place on 5 August 1969 at 1:30am at the RTÉ television studios. The blast was heard over a wide area of Dublin city, even as far as Howth, seven miles away. RTÉ security officer Vincent Brien was knocked to the ground when he was standing 25 feet from the blast, but he was uninjured.

The bomb is believed to have been planted at the rear wall of the studio building and little structural damage occurred except for the shattering of glass panels and some light interior damage. Hours earlier, on the previous day, a petrol bomb had damaged BBC headquarters in Belfast, while the RTÉ bomb was assessed as a plastic explosive.

Later that morning, the main Irish daily newspapers carried front-page coverage of the blast.

== Aftermath ==
This was the start of a Loyalist campaign of bombings in the Republic of Ireland that would continue until the mid-1970s, with the deadliest being the Dublin and Monaghan bombings which killed 34 civilians in May 1974.

On 19 October 1969, Ulster Volunteer Force (UVF) and Ulster Protestant Volunteers member Thomas "Tommy" McDowell was electrocuted while planting a bomb at an electricity sub-station in Ballyshannon, County Donegal. He died of his injuries three days later. On 24 October, the UVF claimed responsibility for both the Ballyshannon and RTÉ bombings. The statement read "the attempted attack was a protest against the Irish Army units still massed on the border in Co Donegal". The statement added: "so long as the threats from Éire continue, so long will the volunteers of Ulster's people's army strike at targets in Southern Ireland". Until then the Irish security forces believed the RTÉ bombing was the work of Irish republicans who had a grudge against RTÉ. The UVF carried out two more bomb attacks in the Republic that year: on the Wolfe Tone memorial in Bodenstown, County Kildare on 31 October, and on 26 December on the O'Connell Monument in Dublin.

Six months after the RTÉ bombing, the UVF struck again at RTÉ. On 18 February 1970, it bombed a 240-foot radio mast on Mongorry (or Mongary) Hill, near Raphoe, County Donegal, putting the transmitter out of action. The mast had allowed RTÉ radio signals to be broadcast into Northern Ireland. The UVF claimed responsibility the next day. UVF sabotage bombings continued sporadically in the Republic throughout 1970 and 1971.

== See also ==
- Timeline of Ulster Volunteer Force actions
- Belturbet bombing
- 1972 and 1973 Dublin bombings
- Dublin and Monaghan bombings
- Dublin Airport bombing
- 1975 Dundalk pub bombing
- Castleblayney bombing
- 1994 Dublin-Belfast train bombing

== Sources ==
- CAIN Web Service: A Chronology of the Conflict - 1969 CAIN: Chronology of the Conflict 1969
- "Bomb Blast at RTÉ". rte.ie.
- Jim Cusack & Henry McDonald (writer) - UVF: The Endgame
