= Bleary Darts Club shooting =

Mass shooting in Bleary, Northern Ireland

- Part of The Troubles
- Location: Bleary, County Down, Northern Ireland
- Date: 27 April 1975; 22:20 PM
- Target: Irish Catholics, Irish nationalists
- Attack type: Mass shooting, mass murder
- Weapons: Sterling submachine gun; Webley revolver; Shotgun
- Deaths: 3 civilians
- Injuries: 1
- Perpetrator: Ulster Volunteer Force

The Bleary Darts Club shooting was a mass shooting that took place on 27 April 1975 in the village of Bleary, Northern Ireland. Members of the Ulster Volunteer Force (UVF) burst into a darts club frequented by Catholics and opened fire on the crowd, killing three civilians and wounding a fourth. The attack is one of many that has been linked to the Glenanne gang.

== Attack ==
The 'Bleary Darts Club' was frequented mainly by Catholics but was also visited by Protestants. On the night of 27 April 1975, there were about thirty men inside. At about 10:40pm, three masked loyalist gunmen kicked the door open and opened fire on the crowd with a Sterling submachine gun, a Webley Revolver and a shotgun. When the burst of gunfire stopped, a customer switched the lights off so the gunmen could not see. There was then another burst of gunfire, followed by several single shots. Another customer kicked the door shut, and the gunmen left. Three men were killed, all Catholic civilians: father-of eight John Feeney (45), father-of-six Joseph Toman (48), and father-of-four Brendan O'Hara (38). A fourth man, a Protestant, was seriously wounded.

== Perpetrators ==
The attack was claimed by the "Protestant Action Force", a cover name used by the Ulster Volunteer Force (UVF), an Ulster loyalist paramilitary group. It is believed the attackers were part of the UVF Mid-Ulster Brigade. Six days before the attack at Bleary, the group had claimed responsibility for killing three Catholic civilians—two brothers and their pregnant sister—in a booby-trap bomb attack at a house near Granville, County Tyrone.

Loyalists Stuart Ashtown and Derek McFarland admitted to the attack in 1980 along with a string of other offenses, including the shooting of Catholic civilians Marian Rafferty and Thomas Mitchell.

The shooting is one of many in the area that has been linked to the Glenanne gang; a group of loyalists that included police officers from the Royal Ulster Constabulary (RUC) and soldiers from the Ulster Defence Regiment (UDR). The sub-machine gun was used in the Miami Showband massacre, which was carried out by members of the group three months later. Circumstantial evidence links Robin Jackson to the attack. Among other evidence, a witness saw him in a car near the club the Sunday before the attack, and saw the same car near the club again, about half an hour before the attack.

== See also ==
- The Troubles in Bleary
- Timeline of Ulster Volunteer Force actions
- Greysteel massacre
- Charlemont pub attacks
- Loughinisland massacre

== Sources ==
- CAIN Web Service: A Chronology of the Conflict - 1975 - 1976 - https://cain.ulster.ac.uk/othelem/chron/ch75.htm https://cain.ulster.ac.uk/othelem/chron/ch76.htm
- Cadwallader, Anne (2013). Lethal Allies: British Collusion in Ireland. Mercier Press. ISBN 978-1-78117-237-7.
