= Dublin Airport bombing =

1975 bombing in Ireland

Coordinates: 53°25′17″N 006°16′12″W

- Part of The Troubles
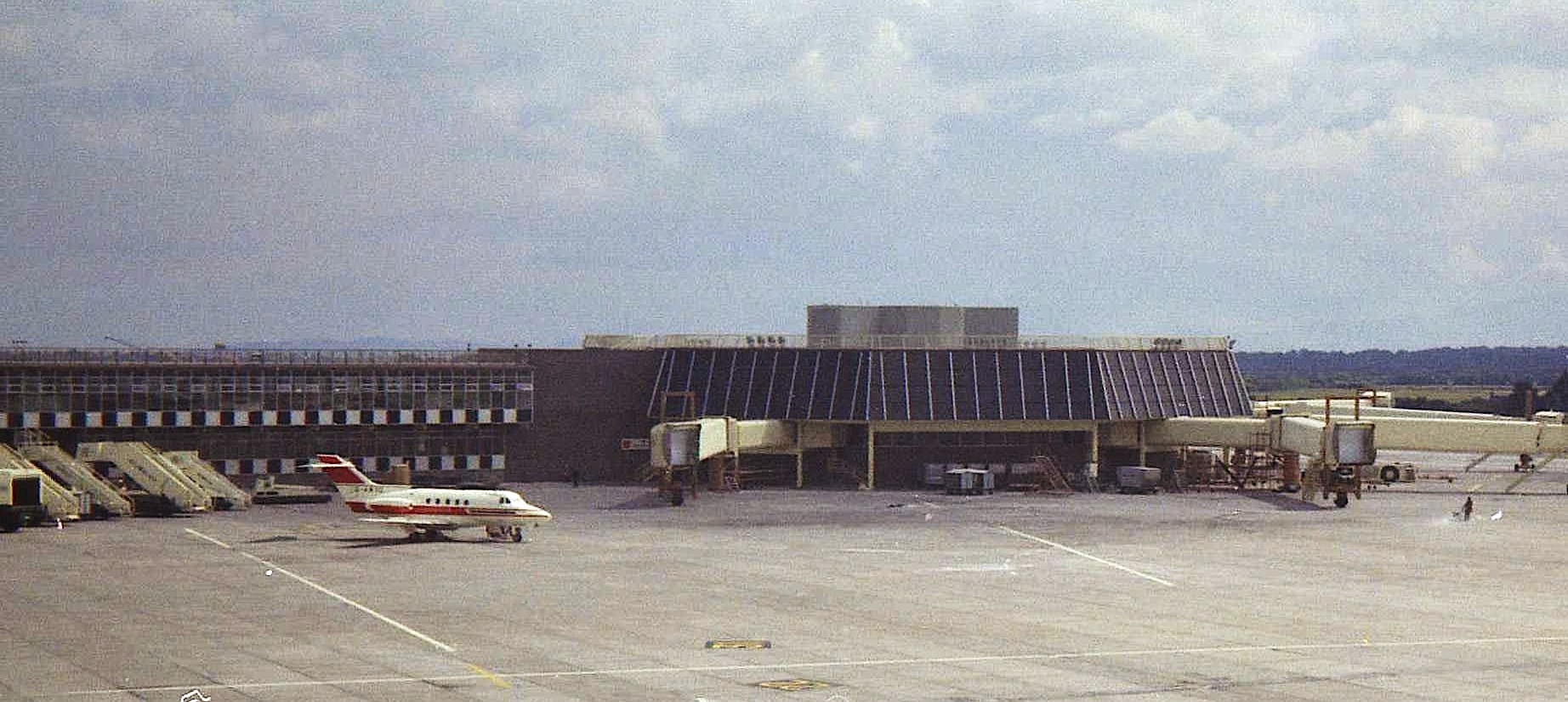
- Dublin Airport in 1971
- Location: Dublin Airport, Fingal, County Dublin, Ireland
- Date: 29 November 1975
- Attack type: 2 time bombs
- Deaths: 1 civilian
- Injuries: 10
- Perpetrator: Ulster Defence Association (UDA)

On 29 November 1975, a bomb exploded in the arrivals terminal of Dublin Airport, killing a man and injuring nine other people. The Ulster Defence Association (UDA), a loyalist paramilitary group from Northern Ireland, claimed responsibility for the bombing. It was one of a series of loyalist bomb attacks in the Republic of Ireland between the late 1960s and mid-1970s.

== Background ==
Loyalists had been carrying out bomb attacks in the Republic of Ireland, mainly in Dublin, and in border counties Cavan, Donegal, Louth and Monaghan, since the beginning of the Troubles in August 1969. Several of these had resulted in fatalities. Three civilians were killed and almost 200 injured in the 1972 and 1973 Dublin bombings, while 34 civilians were killed in the Dublin and Monaghan bombings in 1974, the deadliest attack of the Troubles.

== The bombing ==
On the afternoon of 29 November 1975, a bomb exploded in the public toilets in the arrivals terminal of Dublin Airport. It killed Aer Lingus worker John Hayes (38), who lived in Balbriggan, and injured nine others. According to bomb experts the bomb was hidden in a toilet tissue dispenser and went off after Hayes washed his hands and was about to leave. His body would be discovered four hours later, buried under the rubble. The blast ripped through a wall into a public bar where about thirty people were sitting. The airport was evacuated and just after 2pm, two floors up on the mezzanine floor, a second bomb exploded but nobody was injured. After 3pm, a suitcase was discovered and was destroyed in a controlled explosion by the bomb disposal team.

== Aftermath ==
The UDA claimed responsibility for the bombing shortly after. It said it was "retaliation for the murders of members of the British security forces (Note: In this instance, British security forces includes both the British Army and the RUC) by the IRA operating unhindered from the haven of the Republic with the blessing of the Dublin government".

Political leaders and the main political parties condemned the bombing. Social Democratic and Labour Party (SDLP) leader Gerry Fitt said it was "crazy that the UDA was still a fully legalised organisation" in the United Kingdom.

The UDA bombed Dublin again 11 years later in November 1986, planting four small bombs in bins. Two of the bombs were defused but the other two detonated, although they only caused minor damage and a small fire and nobody was killed or injured. The UDA said they planted the bombs in protest at the Anglo-Irish Agreement of 1985.

Mr. Hayes' murder had a devastating effect on his family, who continue to fight for justice almost 50 years after the atrocity. There has been no effective investigation into the murder, but the case is now being reviewed by Operation Denton. The Denton team are investigating crimes committed by the Glenanne gang in collusion with British security forces.

== See also ==
- RTÉ Studio bombing
- Belturbet bombing
- 1972 and 1973 Dublin bombings
- Dublin and Monaghan bombings
- 1975 Dundalk pub bombing
- Castleblayney bombing
- 1994 Dublin-Belfast train bombing
