= Dublin bombing =

Dublin bombing may refer to:

- Bombing of Dublin in World War II, 1941; 34 killed
- 1972 and 1973 Dublin bombings, 3 killed
- Dublin and Monaghan bombings, 1974; 26 killed in Dublin
- Dublin Airport bombing, 1975; 1 killed
