= Charlemont pub attacks =

1976 Loyalist paramilitary attacks in Northern Ireland

- Part of the Troubles
- Location: Charlemont, County Armagh, Northern Ireland
- Date: 15 May 1976; 22:50 and 22:52 (GMT)
- Attack type: Mass shooting, bombing
- Deaths: 4
- Injuries: 18
- Perpetrator: Ulster Volunteer Force

The Charlemont pub attacks were co-ordinated militant Loyalist paramilitary attacks on two pubs in the small village of Charlemont, County Armagh, Northern Ireland, carried out by the Ulster Volunteer Force (UVF) on 15 May 1976. The attacks have been attributed to the Glenanne gang, a coalition of Loyalist paramilitaries and subversive members inside the Royal Ulster Constabulary (RUC), the Ulster Defense Regiment (UDR) and the British Army.

== Background ==
Since late 1975 there had been a number of deadly sectarian attacks carried out by both Irish Republican and Loyalist paramilitaries in County Armagh. On 15 December, 17-year-old Catholic civilian Ronald Trainor, a member of the Irish Republican Socialist Party (believed to be the political wing of the Irish National Liberation Army), was killed by the UVF in Portadown. On 19 December 1975 the Loyalist Red Hand Commando claimed responsibility for killing three Catholic civilians in a pub in Silverbridge, County Armagh. On 31 December the Irish National Liberation Army using the covername "Armagh People's Republican Army" killed three Protestant civilians when they bombed a pub near Portadown. At the start of January 1976 UVF gunmen killed six Catholic civilians in a double attack in County Armagh. The next day, a group calling itself the South Armagh Republican Action Force shot dead 10 Protestant civilian workmen in what became known as the Kingsmill massacre.

== Attacks ==
Locals claimed that the Ulster Defence Regiment (UDR) had been patrolling the village for a number of nights beforehand, but were absent the night of the attacks.

On the night of 15 May 1976, at around 10:50 pm, the Eagle Bar in Charlemont, County Armagh, was sprayed with gunfire from a Sten submachine gun. Four people were shot and injured in the attack. Probably more would have been injured had the owner of the bar not placed security shutters on the windows in case of an attack. One of those who was injured was Fred McLoughlin (47) who died two weeks later in hospital from his injuries.

Almost immediately after the gunfire at the first pub ended, a bomb exploded at the front of the nearby Clancey's Bar. The force of the blast brought the ceiling crashing down on the people inside the pub. Three people were killed in this bomb attack, including Sean O'Hagan (22), Robert McCullough (41) and the pub's owner Felix "Vincy" Clancy, aged 54. Clancy had just returned from the Eagle Bar a few minutes earlier. About 15 people had been injured in the attack, some of them seriously.

On the same day as the Charlemont attacks, members of the UVF's Belfast Brigade carried out another bomb attack on the Avenue Bar, located on Union Street in Belfast city centre, killing two more Catholic civilians in the process. In total, six Catholic civilians were killed by the UVF throughout day.

== Aftermath ==
A member of the British Territorial Army Gerald Beattie and British UDR soldier David Kane were convicted of the shooting at the Eagle's Bar, and a RUC reservist Joseph Lutton for the bombing at Clancy's Bar, although Lutton named Beattie and Kane as having also taken part in the bombing at Clancy's they were given no further time on to their sentences or even interviewed about the bombing. Two days after the Charlemont attacks the Republican Action Force claimed responsibility for killing Protestant civilians Robert and Thomas Dobson in Moy, County Tyrone, apparently in retaliation for 15 May pub attacks.

== See also ==
- Donnelly's Bar and Kay's Tavern attacks
- Reavey and O'Dowd killings
- Castleblayney bombing
- Hillcrest Bar bombing
- Glenanne gang
- Loughinisland massacre
- Timeline of Ulster Volunteer Force actions
