= Car bomb (disambiguation) =

A car bomb is a type of explosive device.

Car bomb may also refer to:

- Car Bomb (band), an American metal band
- Irish car bomb (disambiguation)
- Daniel Carcillo (born 1985), hockey player for the Chicago Blackhawks nicknamed "Car Bomb"
- "The Car Bomb (Skit)" (song), Track 14 of the Dr.Dre album "2001"
