= Bleary =

Village in County Down, Northern Ireland

Coordinates: 54.423025°N 6.344948°W

Bleary: Irish: Bladhraigh
- Location within County Down
- Population: 1,009 (estimate based on 2011 census)
- Irish grid reference: J073540
  - Belfast: 24 mi (39 km)
- District: Armagh City, Banbridge and Craigavon
- County: County Down
- Country: Northern Ireland
- Sovereign state: United Kingdom
- Post town: CRAIGAVON
- Postcode district: BT63; BT66
- Dialling code: 028
- UK Parliament: Upper Bann
- NI Assembly: Upper Bann
- Website: www.craigavon.gov.uk

Bleary (likely from Irish Bladhraigh) is a small village and townland in County Down, Northern Ireland. It is near the County Armagh border and the settlements of Craigavon, Lurgan and Portadown. In the 2011 Census its population was counted as part of Craigavon. It lies within the Armagh City, Banbridge and Craigavon area.

== History ==
=== The Troubles ===
- 18 June 1972 - Three British soldiers (Arthur McMillan (aged 37), Ian Mutch (aged 31) and Colin Leslie (aged 26)) were killed in an IRA booby-trap bomb attack. The bomb had been left in a derelict house in Bleary.
- 27 April 1975 - Loyalists shot dead three people in Bleary Darts Club. See Bleary Darts Club shooting
- 28 October 1993 - The UVF shot dead two Catholic brothers (Gerrard Cairns, 22, and Rory Cairns, 18) at their home in front of their eleven-year-old sister in Bleary, County Down.

== Education ==
- Bleary Primary School

== Demography ==
=== 2011 Census ===
On Census day (27 March 2011) there were 1,009 people living in Bleary.

- 51.5% belong to or were brought up in a 'Protestant and Other Christian (including Christian related)' religion and 40.6% belong to or were brought up in the Catholic religion.
- 53.6% indicated that they had a British national identity, 20.4% had an Irish national identity, and 32.4% had a Northern Irish national identity.

There were 4,081 people living in the Bleary ward.

- 73.1% belong to or were brought up in a 'Protestant and Other Christian (including Christian related)' religion and 19.9% belong to or were brought up in the Catholic religion.
- 70.65% indicated that they had a British national identity, 11.43% had an Irish national identity, and 27.17% had a Northern Irish national identity.

== See also ==
- List of towns and villages in Northern Ireland
