= October 1975 Northern Ireland attacks =

Series of attacks carried out by the UVF in 1975

- Part of the Troubles
- Location: Belfast, Crumlin, Killyleagh and Coleraine, Northern Ireland
- Date: 2 October 1975
- Attack type: Time bombs, guns and grenades
- Deaths: 12: 8 civilians and 4 UVF volunteers killed by their own bomb
- Injuries: 45
- Perpetrator: Ulster Volunteer Force

On 2 October 1975, the loyalist paramilitary group the Ulster Volunteer Force (UVF) carried out a wave of shootings and bombings across Northern Ireland. Six of the attacks left 12 people dead (mostly civilians) and around 45 people injured. There was also an attack in the village of called Killyleagh, County Down. There were five attacks in and around Belfast which left people dead. A bomb which exploded in Coleraine left four UVF members dead. There were also several other smaller bombs planted around Northern Ireland (16 in total) but other than causing damage they did not kill or injure anyone.

== Background ==
There was a rise in sectarian killings during the Provisional IRA truce with the British Army, which began in February 1975 and officially lasted until February 1976. Loyalists, fearing they were about to be forsaken by the British government and forced into a united Ireland, increased their attacks on Irish Catholics/Irish nationalists. Loyalists killed 120 Catholics in 1975, the vast majority civilians. They hoped to force the IRA to retaliate and thus end the truce. Some IRA units concentrated on tackling the loyalists. The fall-off of regular operations had caused unruliness within the IRA and some members, with or without permission from higher up, engaged in tit-for-tat killings.

== The attacks ==
In the first attack of the day on Casey's Bottling Plant in Belfast; four employees were shot and killed in the attack, sisters Frances Donnelly (age 35), Marie McGrattan (47) and Gerard Grogan (18) all died that day, with a fourth, Thomas Osborne (18), dying of his wounds three weeks later. The UVF group, which was alleged to have been led by Shankill Butchers leader Lenny Murphy, had entered the premises by pretending to have an order to be filled before launching the attack. Murphy personally shot all except Donnelly who was killed by his accomplice William Green. The two sisters were forced to kneel on the ground and were shot in the back of the head.

In the next attack Thomas Murphy (29), a Catholic photographer from Belfast, was killed in a booby-trap bomb and gun attack, when two UVF gunmen entered his premises on Carlisle Circus (close to both the loyalist Shankill Road and republican New Lodge areas of Belfast) and shot him in the chest, before planting a duffel bag bomb in his shop. The resulting explosion injured several people including a female passer-by who lost her leg.

Next the UVF carried out a gun and bomb attack on McKenna's Bar near Crumlin in County Antrim which killed a Catholic civilian John Stewart (35) and injured scores of people.

In Killyleagh, County Down, a no-warning bomb exploded outside a Catholic-owned bar, The Anchor Inn. Irene Nicholson (37), a Protestant woman, was killed as she was passing by while the attack was being carried out. Three UVF members were later arrested for this attack in Bangor and one of them claimed the attack was "a small one to scare them".

N Later at night four UVF members were killed in Coleraine when the bomb they were transporting exploded prematurely.

== Aftermath ==
The next day on 3 October the UVF was once again made a proscribed terrorist organisation. Northern Ireland Secretary Merlyn Rees had unbanned the UVF in May 1974 (the same day the ban on Sinn Féin was lifted, a move never extended to the IRA).

== Sources ==
- CAIN project
