= Granville, County Tyrone =

Village in County Tyrone, Northern Ireland

Coordinates: 54°29′N 6°48′W

Granville is a village in County Tyrone, Northern Ireland, about 2.5 miles (4 km) southwest of Dungannon.

Most of the village is within the townland of Derryveen (from Irish Doire Mhín 'smooth oak-grove'), although some of it extends into Cormullagh (from Cor Mullach meaning "round summit"). The name Granville comes from the 2nd Earl of Ranfurly, who named the village after his son, Granville Henry John Knox, who drowned in the River Tamar in St. Budeaux, Plymouth, at the age of 16.

It consists of an industrial estate, a shop, a housing estate, a number of private dwellings and several farms. The industrial estate includes the headquarters and main factory of Dunbia (formerly, known as Dungannon Meats) and one of the main plants of Linden Foods, also Westland Horticulture has its compost site and head office on the estate.
