= Belturbet bombing =

1972 terrorist attack in Ireland

- Part of the Troubles
- Location: Belturbet, County Cavan, Ireland
- Date: 28 December 1972
- Attack type: Car bomb
- Deaths: 2
- Injuries: 8
- Perpetrator: Ulster Volunteer Force (UVF) 54°06′N 7°27′W

The Belturbet bombing occurred on 28 December 1972 when a car bomb planted by Loyalist paramilitaries exploded in the main street in the border town of Belturbet in County Cavan, Ireland. The bomb killed two teenagers Geraldine O'Reilly (15) and Patrick Stanley (16). Nobody claimed responsibility for the bombing but security services believe the Ulster Volunteer Force (UVF) carried out the attack. The attack happened just a few weeks after two people were killed and 127 injured when two car bombs exploded in the centre of Dublin, Ireland on 1 December 1972. On the same day as the Belturbet bombing, two other bombs exploded in border counties, the first in Clones, County Monaghan which injured two people and the second in Pettigo in County Donegal which caused injury to a single female victim. The three bombs all exploded within 49 minutes of each other, all three bombings were believed to be part of a co-ordinated attack attributed to a single organization.

== Background ==
The Troubles broke out in August 1969 after the Battle of the Bogside and the 1969 Northern Ireland riots. Republican paramilitaries such as the Provisional IRA and Official IRA waged military campaigns against the Northern Ireland state and British state forces and Loyalist paramilitaries such as the UVF and Ulster Defence Association (UDA) waged a campaign against IRA members and the Irish Catholic community at-large. From early on in the conflict, violence spilled over into the Republic of Ireland with the UVF planting bombs to sabotage services. The first bomb attack by the UVF in the Republic of Ireland happened at Radio Telefis Éireann (RTÉ) headquarters in Donnybrook on 5 August 1969. On 19 October 1969, a loyalist bomb intended for the hydroelectric power station near Ballyshannon, County Donegal, exploded prematurely, injuring 45-year old UVF member Thomas McDowell, who died two days later. In December 1969 the UVF exploded another bomb outside the Garda central detective bureau in Dublin. The nearby telephone exchange headquarters was suspected to have been the bombers' target. In February 1971 the Wolfe Tone statue at St. Stephen’s Green was destroyed by a Loyalist bomb.

== Bombing ==
On the night of Thursday 28 December at around 10.30 pm the second in a series of three co-ordinated bombs exploded in a red Ford Escort car at Butler Street, Belturbet, County Cavan; the bomb exploded outside the post office in the main street. Two teenagers, Geraldine O'Reilly who was a local girl, aged 15 and Paddy Stanley, aged 16 from Clara, County Offaly, were killed in the bombing. Twelve others were seriously injured in the bomb attack. The bomb was estimated to have contained 100 lb of explosives. The cost of the damage from the bombing was estimated at £200,000; twenty-three houses and fourteen cars in Butler Street were damaged by the force of the blast. Pieces of the bomb car were recovered from a 100-yard radius of the bomb site. Patrick Stanley had been making a phone call in a nearby kiosk when the bomb went off. Geraldine O'Reilly, who was on her Christmas holidays from school, was across the road in Slowey's chip shop waiting to be served when the bomb exploded, where she suffered massive head injuries from flying shrapnel and died instantly.

Geraldine's brother, Anthony, had been waiting for her outside in his car when the bomb went off; he was seriously injured in the blast. His car was parked just 10 feet from the site of the car bomb.

Earlier that night a bomb exploded in a blue Morris 1100 car on Fermanagh Street, Clones, County Monaghan at 10.01 pm seriously injuring two men. A third bomb exploded outside the licensed premises of Hugh Britton at Mullnagoad, in Pettigo, County Donegal. No one was injured but the pub was extensively damaged from the bombing.

The cars used in the attacks had been stolen earlier on that same day in Enniskillen, County Fermanagh and all three bombs were in a radius of 20 miles from Enniskillen.

The car used in the Belturbet bombing had been driven across the border through the unapproved Aghalane crossing at around 9.00 pm to avoid possibly being confronted by Irish security services.

== Aftermath ==
Loyalist paramilitary attacks in the Republic of Ireland continued throughout much of the 1970s.

Just three weeks later on 20 January 1973 a UVF car bomb exploded in Dublin city, killing one man and injuring fifteen other people. This was the fourth bomb attack in the Republic and third in Dublin within the space of two months that resulted in civilian deaths and injuries.

On 17 May 1974, three car bombs exploded in Dublin and a fourth outside a pub in Monaghan in the Dublin and Monaghan bombings. 34 people all of whom were civilians were killed in the attacks and around 300 people injured making it the most deadly day of the conflict.

On 29 November 1975 two bombs exploded at Dublin airport, killing one person and injuring ten others.

On 19 December 1975 a Loyalist car bomb exploded in the border town of Dundalk in County Louth killing two people and injuring 20. Later that same day another Loyalist gang killed three more people in a gun and bomb attack in an Armagh pub.

Nobody was convicted for any of the Loyalist bombings in the Republic of Ireland.

An award-winning documentary on the atrocity, The Forgotten bomb, was made by Fran McNulty; it featured interviews with the families and locals who remembered the bombing. The programme was broadcast on Shannonside Northern Sound Radio. The journalist won the best regional journalist award in the ESB media awards in 2004 for the programme. Both parents of Patrick Stanley featured in the documentary. The brother of Geraldine O'Reilly, Anthony, who was seriously injured in the attack, also featured. A specially sculptured monument was erected in early 2007 on the site of the bomb, dedicated to these two victims.

Cavan County Council have erected a monument to commemorate their deaths at the site of the bombing. Several memorial services have been held at the monument. The 30th anniversary of the tragedy heard the father of Patrick Stanley, Joe, make a speech at the site, weeks after the death of Patrick's mother.

== Interim Report into Dublin Bombings of 1972 and 1973 ==
A 2004 report into three Dublin bombings & several other bombings in Ireland in the 1970's in regards to the Belturbet bombing concluded that:

"The Inquiry is satisfied that Robert Bridges was involved in the bombing of Belturbet and that his group had also been involved in the bombing of Clones and Pettigo on the same date. The basis for this view is the absence of any intelligence pointing to other groups or individuals and the effective cessation of cross-Border attacks in the area following Bridges' imprisonment. .....

Loyalist groups such as the UDA, UVF and UFF had been active in 1972 in Northern Ireland. Even if bombing Dublin might have been assumed to be outside their area of operation, the three bombings on 28 December 1972 at Clones, Belturbet and Pettigo should have brought the possibility to mind. And although rhetoric is a long way from being evidence of an actual intention, the UDA had recently raised the prospect of an attack on Dublin. In a statement on 14 November 1972, a spokesman at UDA Headquarters claimed responsibility for a number of explosions on the southern side of the border, before continuing:

While on this subject we would like to reiterate our firm intention to strike again across the border not only as reprisals for the IRA campaign here, but also because Jack Lynch is not doing his stuff in dealing with the IRA and is persisting in his claim of sovereignty over all Ireland… We are prepared to hit Dublin and other cities. So don’t be misled by our activities which so far have been confined to border fringe areas.

At 10.01 p.m. on 28 December 1972 a car bomb exploded in Fermanagh Street, Clones, County Monaghan. Two men were seriously injured. At 10.28 p.m. another car bomb exploded on Main Street, Belturbet, County Cavan. Two people were killed; eight more were severely injured. Finally, at 10.50 p.m. a bomb exploded outside the licensed premises of Hugh Britton at Mullnagoad, a village near Pettigo, County Donegal. No one was injured, although a number of persons had passed the place where the bomb had been set up a few minutes before the explosion occurred.

The victims who died in Belturbet were Patrick Stanley,16 years, of Clara, County Offaly, and Geraldine O’Reilly, 15 years, of Drumacon, Belturbet, County Cavan.

Patrick Stanley was employed as a helper on a Calor Gas delivery lorry. On this particular evening, there had been a problem with the lorry; he and the driver decided to stay in Belturbet overnight. When the bomb exploded, Patrick Stanley was in the public phone kiosk on Main Street, trying to telephone his parents to tell them he would not be home. He received massive head injuries from flying shrapnel and was killed instantly.

Geraldine O’Reilly had come into town in her brother’s car to get some chips for her family. The bomb car was parked directly opposite the chip shop. The explosion occurred while she was in the shop, waiting to be served. She too sustained massive head injuries and died instantly."

== See also ==
- Castleblayney bombing
- Dublin bombings
- Dublin-Monaghan bombings
- Dublin Airport bomb

== Sources ==
- CAIN project
