= Castleblayney bombing =

1976 terrorist attack by Ulster loyalists

- Part of the Troubles
- Location: 54.120°N 6.738°W; Castleblayney, County Monaghan, Republic of Ireland
- Date: 7 March 1976
- Attack type: Car bomb
- Deaths: 1
- Injuries: 17
- Perpetrators: Ulster Volunteer Force, Ulster Defense Regiment, part of Glenanne gang

On 7 March 1976 a car bomb exploded outside the Three Star Inn pub, in Castleblayney, County Monaghan, killing one man and injuring 17 other people. The attack has been attributed to the Glenanne gang.

== Background ==
Since at least 5 August 1969, Ulster loyalists had been planting bombs across the Irish border in the Republic. Most of them had been planted by the Ulster Volunteer Force (UVF), a few had been planted by the Ulster Freedom Fighters of the UDA, and at least one by the Ulster Protestant Volunteers (UPV). These early bombs were small and only did small structural damage to a certain target.

The worst of these bombings happened in May 1974 when 34 people were killed and 300 injured in the Dublin and Monaghan bombings.

On 14 February 1976, a month before the bomb at Castleblayney, a UVF bomb exploded in the main street of the small border town of Swanlinbar in County Cavan. There were no injuries.

== Bombing ==
At around 8.20pm, a car bomb, for which no warning had been given, exploded outside the Three Star Inn in Castleblayney, killing 56 year-old Patrick (Packie) Mone instantly. Patrick had a wife called Anna and was a bicycle-mechanic. Despite prompt medical attention, he died on his way to hospital in the ambulance. Additionally, 17 people were injured in the blast which caused much damage in the immediate vicinity.

Loyalist and Glenanne gang member John Weir (who had been born and raised on the Loughbawn Estate in the south-west of County Monaghan) claimed Mone was not the intended target, the 8.20pm Derry-Dublin bus, which usually ran like clock-work, was the intended target; however, the bus was late by about two minutes. Weir also claimed that the attack was carried out by RUC officer Laurence McClure and UDR soldier Robert McConnell, using explosives provided by UDR Captain John Irwin and stored beforehand at James Mitchell's farmhouse. A memorial to Patrick Mone was erected near the site of the bombing in Castleblayney.

== After the bombing ==
On the 17 March, 10 days after the Castleblaney bombing, the Glenanne gang carried out another car bomb attack in the Hillcrest Bar bombing which killed four more people (including two 13 year olds) and injured 50.

== See also ==
- Belturbet bombing (1972)
- 1972 and 1973 Dublin bombings (1972/3)
- Dublin and Monaghan bombings (1974)
- Donnelly's Bar and Kay's Tavern attacks (1975)
