= Donnelly's Bar and Kay's Tavern attacks =

1975 attacks by the Ulster Volunteer Force

- Part of the Troubles
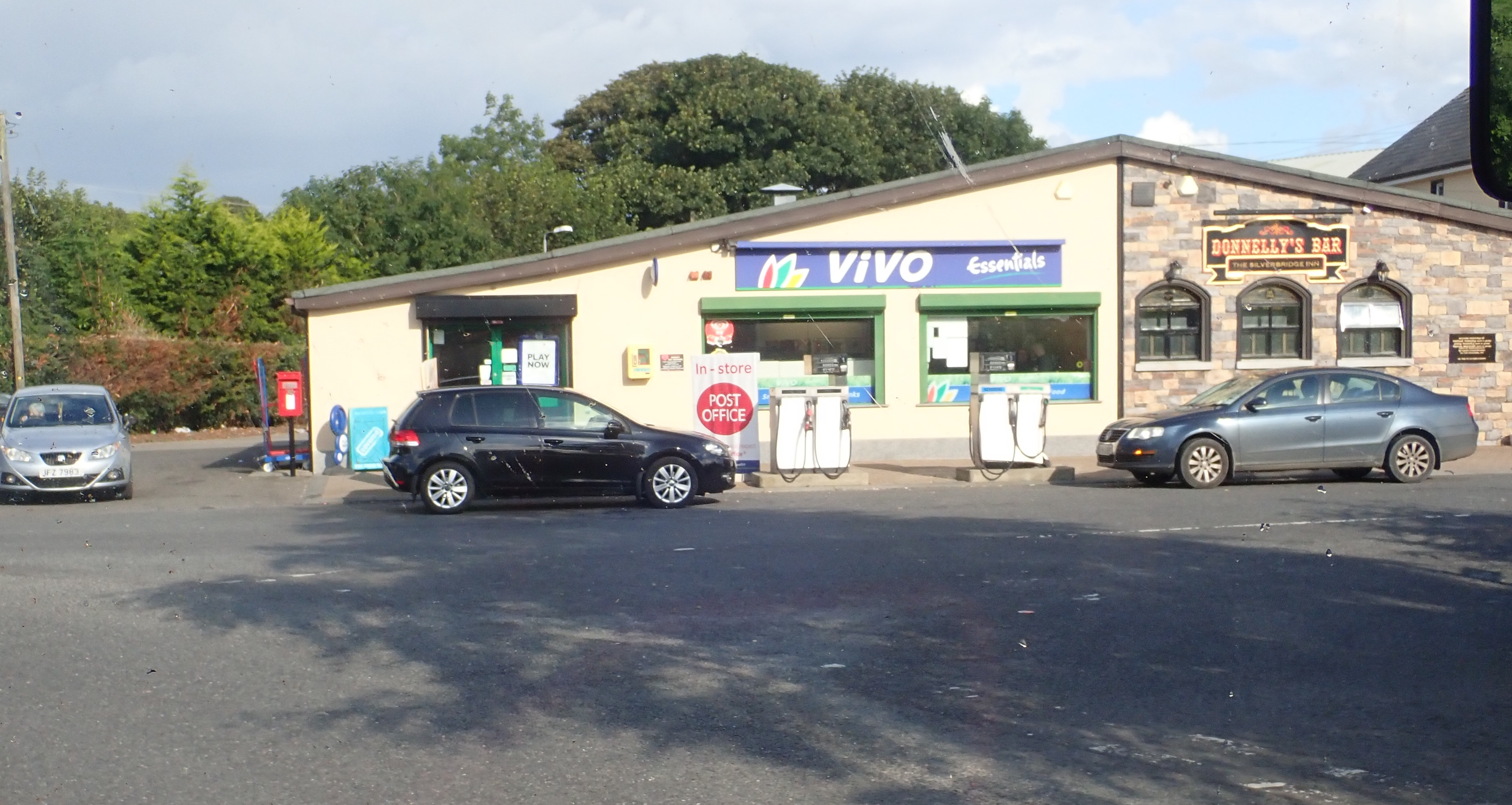
- Top picture the site of the Silverbridge killings
- Location: 54.009°N 6.4049°W, Silverbridge, County Armagh, NI; Dundalk, County Louth, ROI
- Date: 19 December 1975; First attack 18:15; Second attack 21:00
- Attack type: Bombing, shooting
- Deaths: 5 civilians
- Injuries: 26
- Perpetrators: UVF, RHC and UDR members as the Glenanne gang

Locations of attacks

During the evening of 19 December 1975, two coordinated attacks were carried out by the Ulster Volunteer Force (UVF) in pubs either side of the Irish border. The first attack, a car bombing, took place outside Kay's Tavern, a pub along Crowe Street in Dundalk, County Louth, Republic of Ireland - close to the border. The second, a gun and bomb attack, took place at Donnelly's Bar & Filling Station in Silverbridge, County Armagh, just across the border inside Northern Ireland.

The attack has been linked to the Glenanne gang, a group of loyalist militants who were either members of the UVF, the Ulster Defence Regiment (UDR), the Royal Ulster Constabulary (RUC) and the closely linked UVF paramilitary the Red Hand Commando (RHC). Some of the Glenanne gang were members of two of these organisations at the same time, such as gang leaders Billy Hanna, who was in both the UVF and the UDR and who fought for the British Army during the Korean War, and John Weir from County Monaghan, who was in the UVF and was a sergeant in the RUC. At least 25 UDR men and police officers were named as members of the gang. The Red Hand Commando claimed to have carried out both attacks.

== Attacks ==
According to journalist Joe Tiernan, the attacks were planned and led by Robert McConnell and Robin "The Jackal" Jackson who were both alleged to have carried out dozens of sectarian murders during The Troubles, mainly from 1974 to 1977, mostly in south Armagh - which in 1975 was virtually lawless; loyalist paramilitaries and the Provisional IRA roamed the streets and countryside and could set up bogus military checkpoints freely.

The attack was planned at the Glenanne farm of RUC reserve officer James Mitchell which was where most terrorist acts were planned by the gang and the farm also acted as a UVF arms dump and bomb-making site. After the attacks were finished everyone involved in both attacks was to meet at Mitchell's farm. Then if there was any heat Mitchell could claim the bombers and shooters were with him when the attacks happened.

The first phase of the plan started at around 18:15 along Crowe Street in Dundalk when a 100-pound no-warning bomb exploded in a Ford sports car just outside Kay's Tavern. The blast killed Hugh Watters, who was a tailor and had just dropped into the pub to deliver some clothes he had altered for the pub's owner, almost instantly. Jack Rooney who was walking past the town hall on the opposite side of the street was struck in the head by flying shrapnel and died three days later. A further 20 people were injured in the explosion, several of them very seriously. The car bomb was fitted with fake southern registration plates and placed in one of the busiest streets in Dundalk in the hope of causing maximum death and injury. According to Joe Tiernan, UVF commander Robin Jackson planted the bomb and along with other members of his unit escaped across the border in a blue Hillman Hunter around the time the bomb went off.

At around 21:00(9:00PM), about three hours after the Dundalk bombing, the second phase of the coordinated plan began. It was led by McConnell and took place at Donnelly's Bar & Filling Station in the small Armagh village Silverbridge, close to Crossmaglen.

The unit arrived in two cars and came unusually fast towards the pub. The publican's son Michael Donnelly (14) was serving petrol to a customer. He noticed the strange speed of the cars. He tried to run towards the pub, but McConnell jumped out of one of the cars and shot the teenage boy dead with a Sten gun. McConnell then shot the man Michael Donnelly had been serving petrol to in the head. Although the man survived the shooting he was maimed for life.

Then a second gunman, believed to be Billy McCaughey, a UVF volunteer and member of the RUC Special Patrol Group, shot dead a second person, local man Patrick Donnelly (no relation to the pub owner's family) who had been waiting for petrol. McConnell then went inside the pub and sprayed the bar with his Sten SMG, killing a third man, Trevor Bracknell, and seriously injuring three more people.

As McConnell withdrew to his car, two other members of the unit carried a 25-pound cylinder bomb inside the pub. As McConnell's unit fled back to Mitchell's farm, the bomb detonated inside the pub. However, by this time most of the people had already fled.

== See also ==
- Timeline of Ulster Volunteer Force actions
- Glenanne gang
- Red Hand Commando
