= Chronology of Provisional Irish Republican Army actions (1970–1979) =

This is a chronology of activities by the Provisional Irish Republican Army (IRA) from 1970 to 1979.

== 1970 ==
- 1970: the IRA carried out an estimated 130 bombings in Northern Ireland in 1970.

=== February–July ===
- 2 February: The Provisional IRA threw a gelignite bomb from a passing car at a British Army building on the Shankill Road, Belfast where 50 troops were stationed. There were no injuries but the blast blew a hole in the side of the wall. There is some confusion over who threw the bomb, as the UVF was initially not happy with the British Army on the Shankill Road and had been throwing bombs, but the Provisional IRA who were formed in December 1969 wanted to make their presence felt with these kind of bombs according to Belfast Commander Billy McKee.
- 1 March: the IRA bombed and wrecked a statue of mid-late 19th century Protestant evangelical, anti-Catholicism preacher named "Roaring" Hugh Hanna in Carlisle Circus, Belfast at about 03:50 am.
- 4 April: A bomb exploded at an Estate agents offices on Belfast's Lower Donegall Street, shattering numerous windows near the bomb blast, it was the third bombing that day, the first exploded in a furniture shop owned by the then Lord Mayor of Belfast Joseph Foster Cairns on the Shankill Road, the second bomb ruined a tailor shop on Royal Avenue, Belfast a fourth bomb was found in a shop & defused on Rosemary Street. These were the first bombs to explode in shops in three months time & were the beginning of a sustained bombing campaign against economic targets. Security Forces blamed the IRA for the attacks.
- 26 June: two IRA volunteers, Joseph Coyle and Thomas McCool, were killed in a premature explosion of an incendiary device at the McCool home at Dunree Gardens, Creggan, Derry. McCool's two young daughters, Carol Ann (4) and Bernadette (9), were also killed in the explosion. A third IRA member, Thomas Carlin, died of his injuries on 8 July.
- 27 June: rioting erupted in working class parts of Belfast following Orange Order marches past Catholic areas. IRA members used firearms to defend the Short Strand and Ardoyne from attack by Ulster loyalist gunmen and rioters. Two loyalists and one republican died in the cross-shooting (see Battle of St Matthew's).
- 3 July: The IRA bombed an Army recruitment office in Belfast on early Friday morning 3 July, destroying the front of the wall of the building and injuring one person. The blast was heard over six miles away.
- 3–5 July: Falls Curfew – a British Army raid on the Falls Road, Belfast developed into a riot between soldiers and residents and then into gun battles between soldiers and the Official IRA. The IRA also attacked troops with improvised grenades. The British Army sealed off the area, imposed a 36-hour curfew and raided hundreds of homes under the cover of CS gas. The British Army eventually admitted there had been incidents of looting during these raids. Three Catholic civilians (William Burns, Charles O'Neill, and Zbigniew Uglik) were killed by the British Army and more than 60 people were wounded.
- 13 July: The IRA fire bombed the hotel Elsinore on the Antrim Road causing a large blaze which caused much damage but no injuries as the hotel was unoccupied at the time of the bombing.
- 16 July: The IRA carried out a bomb attack on the Northern Bank premises in High Street, Belfast City centre. 30 people were injured in the blast.

=== August–December ===
- 11 August: two Royal Ulster Constabulary (RUC) officers, Samuel Donaldson (aged 23) and Robert Millar (aged 26), were killed by an IRA booby-trap bomb attached to an abandoned car near Crossmaglen, South Armagh. The bomb contained 20 lb (9.1 kg) of gelignite and exploded when one of the officers attempted to open one of the car's doors. (see – 1970 Crossmaglen bombing)
- 4 September: an IRA volunteer (Michael Kane, aged 35) was killed when a bomb he was planting at an electricity transformer on New Forge Lane, Malone, Belfast, exploded prematurely.
- 16 November: the IRA shot dead two Catholic men, Arthur McKenna (aged 35) and Alexander McVicker (aged 35), as alleged criminals while the two were repairing a car, Ballymurphy Road, Belfast. The men were alleged to have been involved in protection rackets, fencing stolen goods, minor racketeering, money-lending, burglary and robbery.

== 1971 ==
=== January–February ===
- January 1971: following months of clashes between British soldiers and Irish nationalists in Ballymurphy, the British Army held secret talks with the IRA. It was agreed that, in parts of West Belfast, the IRA would be responsible for policing and there would be no activity by the British Army or RUC.
- 3 February 1971: under pressure from the unionist government of Northern Ireland, the British Army began a series of raids in nationalist areas of West and North Belfast. This sparked clashes between residents and British soldiers, and between nationalists and loyalists. Eight soldiers and a number of civilians were wounded. The IRA saw the raids as a breach of the policing agreement, and violence continued for the next few nights.
- 6 February 1971: the British Army shot dead IRA staff officer James Saunders (22) in North Belfast. The British Army claimed soldiers removing barricades in the Oldpark district came under gun and bomb attack. In Ardoyne, soldiers shot dead a Catholic civilian, Bernard Watt (28), whom they claimed was armed, after an armoured personnel carrier was attacked.
- 6 February 1971: during clashes between nationalists and British soldiers in the New Lodge district, the IRA opened fire on a group of soldiers, killing Gunner Robert Curtis. He was the first British soldier killed in Ireland since the 1920s. The next day, James Chichester-Clark, Prime Minister of Northern Ireland, declared on television that "Northern Ireland is at war with the Irish Republican Army Provisionals". Eight British soldiers and five civilians were injured in various gun battles around Belfast.
- 8 February 1971: during clashes on the Crumlin Road, Ardoyne, Belfast, two British Army scout vehicles came under sniper fire and had a bomb thrown at them. A soldier (John Laurie) was shot in the head and died eight days later, on 15 February.
- 9 February 1971: at the funeral of IRA volunteer James Saunders, a three-volley salute was fired over his coffin by the IRA. The funeral cortege was forced to make a detour when 300 loyalists blocked Oldpark Road and stoned mourners. There were also scuffles with police. There was controversy after a British soldier was filmed saluting the coffin as it passed his armoured car.
- 9 February 1971: five men, George Beck (aged 43), John Eakins (aged 52), Harry Edgar (aged 26), David Henson (aged 24), and William Thomas (aged 35) were killed while travelling in a Land Rover, which detonated a landmine on track, Brougher Mountain, near Trillick, County Tyrone. A British Army mobile patrol was reportedly the intended target. The five were on their way to inspect a transmitter: two of the dead men were BBC engineers, the other three were construction workers. The landmine was intended for a British Army patrol that usually inspected the transmitters.
- 26 February 1971: Two RUC Special Patrol Group officers, Robert Buckley (aged 30) and Cecil Patterson (aged 45), were killed in a gun battle with the IRA while on Royal Ulster Constabulary mobile patrol, Etna Drive, Ardoyne, Belfast.

=== March–April ===
- 8 March 1971: Provisional IRA volunteer Charles Hughes (26) was shot dead by the Official IRA, while leaving a house on Leeson Street, Lower Falls, Belfast; part of an ongoing dispute between the Provisional IRA and the Official IRA. In response the Provisional IRA shot and seriously injured an Official IRA volunteer.
- 9 March 1971: the Provisional IRA kidnapped three off-duty Scottish soldiers (John McCaig, Joseph McCaig, and Dougald McCaughey) in Belfast, brought them to a mountain road outside the city and shot each in the head. They were the first off-duty soldiers from Britain to be killed in the conflict.

=== May–June ===
- 15 May 1971: IRA volunteer Billy Reid was killed during a gun battle between the IRA and the British Army on Academy Street, Belfast. Two British soldiers were wounded in the incident.
- 23 May 1971: The Provisional IRA was blamed for the bombing of a Protestant pub on Belfast's Shankill Road called the Mountain View Tavern. 18 people were injured in the blast, an estimated 5-10 lbs of explosives was used in the bomb. This was one of the first Pub bombings of The Troubles.
- 25 May 1971: a bomb was thrown into Springfield Road British Army/RUC base in Belfast, killing British Army Sergeant Michael Willetts as he shielded civilians from the blast with his body. He was posthumously awarded the George Cross. Seven RUC officers, two British soldiers and 18 civilians were injured.

=== July–August ===
- 12 July 1971: a British soldier (David Walker, aged 30) was shot dead by an IRA sniper at a British observation post on Northumberland Street, Lower Falls, Belfast. The IRA claimed his death was in retaliation for the killings of two civilians in Derry by the British Army the previous week.
- 14 July 1971: a British soldier (Richard Barton, aged 24) was shot dead in an IRA ambush on a mobile patrol in Andersonstown, Belfast. Three IRA gunmen using automatic weapons fired at least 35 shots at the patrol.
- 16 July 1971: volunteers from the Provisional IRA Belfast Brigade fired a rocket launcher at Andersonstown RUC station, the rocket was launched from a nearby café. The shell badly damaged the station but no serious injuries were reported.
- 8 August 1971: a British soldier (Malcolm Hatton, aged 21) was shot dead in an IRA sniper attack while on foot patrol, Brompton Park, Ardoyne, Belfast. The IRA claimed he was shot in retaliation for the shooting death of a civilian by the British Army the day before on the Springfield Road.
- 9 August 1971: 343 suspects were detained as internment was introduced (see Operation Demetrius). In the following two days 17 people were killed in gun battles between the IRA and British Army. The IRA killed two British soldiers (one of them UDR) while the British Army shot dead one IRA volunteer and 14 civilians. Between 1971 and 75, 1,981 people were interned; 1,874 were Catholic and 107 were Protestant.
- 9 August 1971: a UDR soldier (Winston Donnell, aged 22), was killed in a joint Provisional and Official IRA ambush at a vehicle check point in Clady, County Tyrone.
- 10 August 1971: Norman Watson, a Protestant civilian, was killed in the crossfire between the IRA and soldiers in Armagh.
- 10 August 1971: Paul Challoner (aged 23), a British soldier, was shot dead by the IRA while on foot patrol, Bligh's Lane, Creggan, Derry.
- 11 August 1971: an IRA volunteer (Seamus Simpson, aged 21), was shot dead while throwing a bomb at a British Army foot patrol, Rossnareen Avenue, Andersonstown, Belfast.
- 16 August 1971: the commander of the Provisionals' Belfast Brigade, Joe Cahill, gave a press conference claiming only 30 IRA volunteers had been interned.
- 18 August 1971: an IRA volunteer (Eamon Lafferty, aged 20) was shot dead during a gun battle between the IRA and the British Army in Kildrum Gardens, Creggan, Derry City.
- 23 August 1971: a British soldier (George Crozier, aged 23) was shot dead by an IRA sniper on Flax Street, Ardoyne, Belfast. The soldier was shot in the head as he exited a British armoured vehicle.
- 25 August 1971: a Protestant civilian (Henry Beggs, aged 23) was killed when the IRA bombed the Northern Ireland Electricity office on the Malone Road, Belfast. An inadequate warning was given.
- 29 August 1971: Battle of Courtbane, a British soldier (Ian Armstrong, aged 33) was shot dead by an IRA sniper near Crossmaglen, County Armagh. The soldier was travelling in a patrol consisting of two armoured Ferret Scout cars which inadvertently crossed the Irish border into County Louth near the village of Courtbane. While attempting to retreat back angry locals blocked their way and set one of the vehicles on fire. After eventually managing to get back across the border the patrol had to stop to change a damaged wheel. While this was happening a six-man IRA unit arrived on the scene and took up sniping positions in nearby fields. The soldier was killed after being shot in the neck. Another soldier was injured when he was struck in the shoulder.
- 31 August 1971: a British soldier (Clifford Loring, aged 18) was killed when he was shot by an IRA sniper at a vehicle checkpoint at Stockman's Lane, Andersonstown, Belfast. A single shot was fired by a sniper which passed through the shoulder strap of another soldier's flak-jacket before hitting Loring in the head.

=== September–October ===
- 1 September 1971: The IRA exploded a number of bombs across Belfast and Derry injuring about two dozen people.
- 2 September 1971: The IRA exploded a bomb at the headquarters of the Ulster Unionist Party (UUP) which wrecked the building, a number of people were injured in the blast.
- 3 September 1971: a UDR soldier (Francis Veitch, aged 23) was shot dead while on guard duty outside Kinawley RUC in County Fermanagh, when an IRA unit attacked.
- 3 September 1971: a 17-month-old toddler (Angela Gallagher) was killed after being hit by a ricochet bullet in her pram during an IRA sniper attack at a British army patrol in the Iveagh Drive/Iveagh Street area, Falls Road, Belfast.
- 9 September 1971: a British Army bomb-disposal expert (David Stewardson, aged 29) died while attempting to defuse a bomb at Castlerobin Orange Hall, Drumankelly, near Lisburn, County Antrim.
- 14 September 1971: a British soldier (John Rudman, aged 21) was shot dead while on mobile patrol, Edendork, near Coalisland, County Tyrone.
- 15 September 1971: a British soldier (Paul Carter, aged 21) died one day after being shot outside Royal Victoria Hospital, Falls Road, Belfast by the IRA.
- 17 September 1971: a British soldier (Peter Herrington, aged 28) was shot dead by an IRA sniper while on foot patrol, Brompton Park, Ardoyne, Belfast.
- 18 September 1971: an RUC officer (Robert Leslie, aged 20) was shot dead while on foot patrol by the IRA at Abercorn Square, Strabane, County Tyrone.
- 20 September 1971: The IRA exploded a bomb in the Bluebell Bar in the Loyalist Sandy Row area injuring 27 people.
- 23 September 1971: a patrol boat belonging to the Northern Ireland Fishery Conservancy Board was bombed and wrecked by an IRA unit at Derryinver, Lough Neagh.
- 29 September 1971: Two Protestant civilians were killed when the Four Step Inn on the Shankill Road in Belfast was bombed. No group said they did the bombing but it's believed the Provisional IRA was behind the bombing.
- 1 October 1971: a British soldier (Peter Sharpe, aged 22) was shot dead in an IRA gun attack on a British Army foot patrol, Kerrera Street, Ardoyne, Belfast.
- 2 October 1971: an IRA volunteer (Terence McDermott, aged 19) died after the bomb he was transporting to an electricity sub-station at Lambeg, near Lisburn, County Antrim, exploded prematurely.
- 3 October 1971: an Agriculture Ministry imports inspector (Patrick Daly, aged 57) from Moira, County Down was shot dead by the IRA.
- 11 October 1971: a British soldier (Roger Wilkins, aged 32) was shot dead by the IRA while on foot-patrol on Letterkenny Road, Derry.
- 15 October 1971: two RUC officers, Cecil Cunningham (aged 46) and John Haslett (aged 21), were shot dead by an IRA unit while sitting in stationary RUC vehicle at the junction of Woodvale Road and Twaddell Avenue, Belfast.
- 16 October 1971: a British soldier (Joseph Hill, aged 24) was shot dead by the IRA during street disturbances, Columcille Court, Bogside, Derry.
- 17 October 1971: a British soldier (Graham Cox, aged 35) died two days after being shot by an IRA sniper while travelling in a British Army armoured personnel carrier, Oldpark Road, Belfast.
- 17 October 1971: a British soldier (George Hamilton, aged 21) was shot dead by an IRA sniper while on foot patrol, Glenalina Park, Ballymurphy, Belfast.
- 23 October 1971: two female IRA volunteers, Maura Meehan (aged 30) and Dorothy Maguire (aged 19), were shot dead by the British Army while travelling in car warning local residents of house raids, Cape Street, Lower Falls, Belfast.
- 24 October 1971: an IRA volunteer (Martin Forsythe, aged 19) was shot dead by the RUC during a bomb attack, Celebrity Club, Donegall Place, Belfast. His partner in the mission, IRA volunteer and later Sinn Féin politician Rita O'Hare, was seriously wounded.
- 27 October 1971: two British soldiers, David Tilbury (aged 29) and Angus Stevens (aged 18), were killed in an IRA bomb attack on an observation post at the rear of Rosemount RUC/British Army base, Derry.
- 27 October 1971: an RUC officer (Ronald Dodd, aged 34) was shot dead by an IRA sniper when he arrived with a mobile patrol at the scene of fire in a house at Gallagh, near Toome, County Antrim.
- 27 October 1971: a British soldier (David Powell, aged 22) was killed when a British Army armoured personnel carrier struck an IRA landmine in Kinawley, County Fermanagh.
- 29 October 1971: an RUC officer (Alfred Devlin, aged 42), was killed in a bomb attack on Chichester Road Royal Ulster Constabulary (RUC) base, off the Antrim Road, Belfast.
- 30 October 1971: a British soldier (Norman Booth, aged 22) was killed when the IRA bombed a British Army Observation Post on the junction of Springfield Road and Cupar Street, Belfast.
- 31 October 1971: a British soldier (Ian Doherty, aged 27) died three days after being shot while on mobile patrol, Stockman's Lane, Belfast.
- 31 October 1971: the Post Office Tower in London (later renamed the British Telecom Communication Tower) was heavily damaged by an IRA bomb.

=== November–December ===
- 1 November 1971: two RUC officers, Stanley Corry (aged 28) and William Russell (aged 31), were shot dead by an IRA unit while investigating a burglary, Avoca Shopping Centre, Andersonstown, Belfast.
- 2 November 1971: three Protestant civilians (John Cochrane, Mary Gemmell, and William Jordan) were killed in bomb attacks on a drapery shop and Red Lion Bar, either side of Ormeau Road Royal Ulster Constabulary (RUC) base, Belfast. They were drinking in the Red Lion Bar, next door to the base at the time. Jordan died on 4 November 1971. Inadequate warning given.
- 4 November 1971: a British soldier (Stephen McGuire, aged 20) died seven weeks after being shot in an IRA attack on the Henry Taggart British Army base, Ballymurphy, Belfast.
- 7 November 1971: an off-duty British soldier (Paul Genge, aged 18) was shot dead while walking along Tandragee Road, Lurgan, County Armagh, in an IRA drive-by attack.
- 9 November 1971: a British soldier (Ian Curtis, aged 23) was shot dead while on foot patrol by an IRA sniper on Foyle Road, Derry City.
- 11 November 1971: two RUC officers, Dermot Hurley (aged 50) and Walter Moore (aged 37), were shot dead by the IRA in a shop at the rear of Oldpark Royal Ulster Constabulary (RUC) base, Oldpark Road, Belfast.
- 18 November 1971: a British soldier (Edwin Charnley, aged 22) was shot dead by the IRA while guarding a bus depot, Anderson Street, Short Strand, Belfast.
- 22 November 1971: Michael Crossey (aged 21), an IRA volunteer was killed in a premature bomb explosion at Cellar Lounge Bar, Church Place, Lurgan, County Armagh.
- 23 November 1971: a civilian from County Donegal (Bridget Carr, aged 24) died four days after being shot during a sniper attack on a nearby British Army patrol while walking along Lifford Road, Strabane, County Tyrone.
- 24 November 1971: a British Army bomb disposal expert (Colin Davies, aged 38) was killed attempting to defuse a car-bomb left in a car showroom at William Street, Lurgan, County Armagh.
- 27 November 1971: two Customs Officials, Ian Hankin (a 27-year-old Protestant) and James O'Neill (a 39-year-old Catholic), were killed when IRA snipers attacked Killeen Customs Post near Newry. The soldiers guarding the post were reportedly the intended targets.
- 27 November 1971: a British soldier (Paul Nicholls, aged 18) was shot dead by an IRA sniper while on foot patrol, St James Crescent, Falls Road, Belfast.
- 29 November 1971: an off-duty British soldier, Robert Benner (aged 25), originally from Dundalk, County Louth but raised in England, where he had joined the army, was found shot dead at Teer, near Crossmaglen, County Armagh. He had been returning from his fiancée's home in Dundalk when he was attacked. A "non-specific Republican group" was cited as responsible in Sutton. A news report claimed he had been tortured.
- 6 December 1971: a Protestant civilian, Mary Thompson (aged 61), was killed when a wall collapsed onto her shortly after an IRA bomb attack on the Salvation Army Citadel building next door, Dublin Road, Belfast.
- 7 December 1971: an off-duty UDR soldier (Denis Wilson, aged 31), was shot dead by the IRA at Curlagh, Aghaloo, near Caledon, County Tyrone.
- 8 December 1971: an off-duty UDR soldier, Sean Russell (aged 30), was shot dead at his home at New Barnsley Crescent, Ballymurphy, Belfast.
- 8 December 1971: a British Army soldier, Jeremy Snow (aged 35), died four days after being shot by a sniper while on foot patrol, New Lodge, Belfast.
- 10 December 1971: a UDR soldier and an ex-soldier were killed when their car was attacked by an IRA unit near Clady, Strabane, County Tyrone.
- 11 December 1971: a bomb attack on a furniture shop on the Shankill Road in Belfast killed four Protestant civilians, including two children. No organisation claimed responsibility, but there was speculation that it may have been planted by the IRA in retaliation for the McGurk's Bar bombing of 4 December.
- 16 December 1971: a British soldier (Anthony Aspinwall, aged 22 Gloucestershire Regiment), was shot dead by an IRA sniper in the Lower Falls area of Belfast.
- 18 December 1971: three IRA volunteers (James Sheridan, John Bateson and Martin Lee) died in Magherafelt, County Londonderry, when the bomb they were transporting exploded prematurely.
- 21 December 1971: a Catholic publican (John Lavery, aged 60) was killed when he picked up and attempted to remove a bomb that had been planted in his pub on the Lisburn Road, Belfast. The Sutton database lists the IRA as responsible.
- 21 December 1971: an IRA volunteer (Gerald McDade, aged 23) was shot dead after being captured by the British Army in the Ardoyne area of Belfast.
- 29 December 1971: a British soldier (Richard Ham, aged 20), was shot dead while on British Army foot patrol, Foyle Road, Brandywell, Derry.
- 31 December 1971: an IRA volunteer, Jack McCabe (aged 55), originally from County Cavan, was killed when a bomb he was assembling exploded accidentally in Santry, Dublin.

== 1972 ==
=== January ===
- 3 January 1972: The IRA exploded a bomb in Callender Street, Belfast, which injured over 60 people.
- 5 January 1972: A British soldier (Keith Bryan, aged 18), was shot dead by an IRA sniper while on foot patrol, Ardmoulin Street, Lower Falls, Belfast.
- 7 January 1972: An IRA volunteer (Daniel O'Neill, aged 20) died two days after being shot during a gun battle with British troops, Oranmore Street, Clonard, West Belfast.
- 12 January 1972: An off-duty RUC reservist (Raymond Denham, aged 42) was shot dead by an IRA unit at his workplace, Waterford Street, Lower Falls, Belfast.
- 13 January 1972: An off-duty UDR soldier (Maynard Crawford, aged 38) was shot dead by an IRA sniper while driving his firm's van along King's Road, off Doagh Road, Newtownabbey, County Antrim.
- 17 January 1972: Seven IRA volunteers, jailed in the prison ship HMS Maidstone, escaped successfully through a porthole on the side away from the dock. They swam to the dockside and hijacked a bus which they drove to the Markets area. The escapees later held a press conference.
- 21 January 1972: A British soldier (Philip Stentiford, aged 18) was killed when he stepped on an IRA landmine, Derrynoose, near Keady, County Armagh.
- 26 January 1972: An IRA volunteer (Peter McNulty, aged 47) was killed when a bomb he was planting at an RUC base in Castlewellan, County Down, exploded accidentally.
- 27 January 1972: An IRA unit fought a 4-hour gun battle with a British Army detachment at Dungooley, County Armagh. The British Army alone fired over 4,500 rounds while the IRA returned fire with assault rifles and an anti-tank gun. There were no casualties in the battle with the exception of a pig which was caught in the crossfire. Eight IRA volunteers were arrested south of the border but were eventually acquitted.
- 27 January 1972: Two RUC officers, Peter Gilgunn (aged 26) and David Montgomery (aged 20), were killed when their patrol vehicle was hit by IRA gunfire in Creggan, Derry.
- 28 January 1972: An off-duty RUC officer (Raymond Carroll, aged 22) was shot dead in an IRA gun attack at a garage, Oldpark Road, Belfast.
- 30 January 1972: A British soldier, Robin Alers-Hankey (aged 35), died four months after being injured in an IRA sniper attack in the Bogside, Derry.

=== February ===
- 1 February 1972: A British soldier, Ian Bramley (aged 25), was shot dead by an IRA sniper while leaving Hastings Street Royal Ulster Constabulary (RUC)/British Army (BA) base, Lower Falls, Belfast.
- 2 February 1972: A bomb exploded at the Catholic-owned Imperial Bar in Stewartstown, County Tyrone. The pub was officially closed in mourning for those who died on Bloody Sunday, but some customers had gone in through the back door for a drink. One Catholic civilian, Louis O'Neill (aged 49), was killed. There was initial newspaper speculation that the IRA had bombed the bar because it had not closed fully, and the Sutton database lists the IRA as responsible. However, some believe loyalists were responsible for the attack.
- 5 February 1972: Paul McFadden (aged 31), a Catholic civilian, died six days after being injured in a van bomb explosion at Castle Arcade, off Castle Lane, Belfast.
- 5 February 1972: Two IRA volunteers (Phelim Grant and Charles McCann) were killed when a bomb they were transporting exploded accidentally on a barge on Lough Neagh, near Crumlin, County Antrim.
- 10 February 1972: An IRA volunteer (Joseph Cunningham, aged 26) was killed in a gun battle with the RUC at O'Neill's Road, Newtownabbey, County Antrim.
- 10 February 1972: Two British soldiers, Ian Harris (aged 26) and David Champ (aged 23), were killed in an IRA landmine attack on their Armoured Personnel Carrier in Cullyhanna, County Armagh.
- 13 February 1972: An off-duty British soldier, Thomas McCann (aged 19), from Dublin, was shot dead by the IRA near Newtownbutler, County Fermanagh.
- 16 February 1972: Thomas Callaghan (aged 45), a Catholic member of the Ulster Defence Regiment, was found shot dead shortly after being abducted while driving a bus along Foyle Road, Derry.
- 16 February 1972: Michael Prime (aged 18), British Army, was shot dead while on mobile patrol by a sniper by the Moira roundabout on the M1 motorway in County Down.
- 17 February 1972: Elizabeth English (aged 65), a Catholic civilian, died seven days after being shot during an attempted ambush of a British Army foot patrol, Barrack Street, Lower Falls, Belfast.
- 21 February 1972: Four IRA volunteers (Gerard Bell, Robert Dorrian, Joseph Magee, and Gerard Steele) died in Belfast when a bomb they were transporting exploded prematurely along Knockbreda Road, near the Castlereagh Road roundabout, Belfast.
- 24 February 1972: The IRA bombed the town hall of Strabane, County Tyrone and in Belfast bombed a car showroom along the Falls Road which was the third time it was bombed in a year.
- 25 February 1972: An IRA bomb set on fire and destroyed the Hart & Churchill music store in Belfast. The building was never rebuilt.
- 29 February 1972: An off-duty UDR soldier, Henry Dickson (aged 46), was shot dead by the IRA at his home on Lawrence Street, Lurgan, County Armagh.

=== March ===
- 1 March 1972: An off-duty UDR soldier, John Fletcher (aged 43), was shot dead by the IRA outside his home at Frevagh, near Garrison, County Fermanagh.
- 1 March 1972: A British soldier was shot in the head and seriously wounded when an anti-riot squad was ambushed by a single IRA member at Creggan, Derry.
- 2 March 1972: A Provisional IRA car bomb exploded at Ferryquay street in Derry. Dozens of commercial premises were damaged and 42 people injured.
- 3 March 1972: A British soldier (Stephen Keating, aged 18) was shot dead by an IRA sniper while on foot patrol, Manor Street, Belfast.
- 4 March 1972: An IRA volunteer, Albert Kavanagh (aged 18), was shot dead by the RUC during an attempted bomb attack on factory, Boucher Road, Belfast.
- 4 March 1972: A bomb exploded at the Abercorn Restaurant in Belfast without any warning. Two Catholic civilians (Anne Owens, aged 22, and Janet Bereen, aged 21) were killed and over 100 people maimed and injured. IRA volunteers blamed, but the IRA has never acknowledged responsibility for what may have been a rogue operation.
- 8 March 1972: A UDR soldier (Joseph Jardine, aged 44), off-duty Ulster Defence Regiment (UDR) soldier, shot dead at his workplace, the Ministry of Agriculture office in Middletown, County Armagh.
- 9 March 1972: Four IRA volunteers, Gerard Crossen (aged 19), Sean Johnson (aged 19), Anthony Lewis (aged 16), and Thomas McCann (aged 20), were all killed in a premature bomb explosion inside a house on Clonard Street, Lower Falls, Belfast, when a bomb they were assembling exploded accidentally.
- 14 March 1972: Two IRA volunteers, Colm Keenan (aged 19) and Eugene McGillan (aged 18) were shot dead by the British Army in an entry off Dove Gardens, Bogside, Derry.
- 14 March 1972: A two-man IRA unit armed with sub-machine guns ambushed a joint British Army/RUC patrol on Brackaville Road outside Coalisland, County Tyrone. Over 50 shots were fired by the unit. The RUC officer, William Logan (aged 23), who was driving the police patrol vehicle was mortally wounded and died the following day.
- 14 March 1972: After the end of a three-day cease fire, an IRA bomb caused widespread damage in the main street of Lisburn. Three soldiers and an RUC officer were wounded.
- 15 March 1972: Two British soldiers, Christopher Cracknell (aged 29) and Anthony Butcher (aged 24), were killed by an IRA booby-trap bomb hidden in an abandoned car, Grosvenor Road, Belfast.
- 20 March 1972: Two RUC officers, a British soldier and four civilians were killed when the IRA detonated a car bomb on Donegall Street in Belfast. The warning had been inadequate.
- 20 March 1972: Royal Green Jackets Rifleman John Taylor (aged 19) was shot dead by an IRA sniper at Lower Road near William Street in Derry.
- 21 March 1972: Two IRA car bombs, each one carrying 100 pounds (45 kg) of explosives, went off in Derry, damaging commercial premises and wounding 26 people, including an RUC constable.
- 23 March 1972: The IRA detonated two car bombs in Main Street, Bangor, County Down.
- 25 March 1972: An IRA volunteer (Patrick Campbell, aged 16) was shot dead in error by another IRA volunteer, while preparing for an ambush of a British Army patrol at the junction of Springhill Avenue and Springfield Road, Belfast.
- 28 March 1972: The IRA carried out a car-bomb attack on Limavady RUC base, Limavady, County Londonderry. Joseph Forsythe (aged 57) and Robert McMichael (aged 27), unrelated Protestant civilians, were killed driving past the base when a van bomb explosion was detonated.
- 29 March 1972: A British soldier (Bernard Calladene, aged 39) was killed by an IRA booby-trap bomb hidden inside an abandoned car, Wellington Street, Belfast.
- 30 March 1972: A Catholic civilian, Martha Crawford (aged 39), was killed in the crossfire of a gun-battle between the IRA and the British Army, Rossnareen Avenue, Andersonstown, Belfast.

=== April ===
- 5 April 1972: A soldier crewing a vehicular checkpoint was hit in the arm by an IRA sniper at Abercorn road, Derry.
- 6 April 1972: A teenager was shot and wounded by IRA gunmen in the Protestant area of Tates Avenue.
- 7 April 1972: An airborne British army patrol was ambushed in County Londonderry, between Creggan estate and the border, by an IRA unit. An hour-long gun battle ensued, with no casualties reported from either side.
- 7 April 1972: Three IRA volunteers, Samuel Hughes, Charles McCrystal, and John McErlean (all aged 17), were killed in a premature bomb explosion in a garage in Bawnmore Park, Greencastle, Belfast.
- 8 April 1972: A British soldier (Peter Sime, aged 22) on foot patrol was killed in an IRA sniper attack on the Springfield Road, Belfast.
- 11 April 1972: An IRA volunteer fired a Thompson sub-machine gun at a passing British army patrol at the junction of Eastway and Lone Moor Road. The patrol returned fire. No injuries were reported.
- 13 April 1972: The IRA detonated a car-bomb on Main Street, Ballymoney, County Antrim. Despite a warning to evacuate the area, a Protestant civilian, Elizabeth McAuley (aged 64), was killed.
- 13 April 1972: A car showroom was utterly destroyed in Belfast after a car bomb was driven into the parking area by an IRA volunteer, who gave the alarm. No one was injured by the explosion.
- 14 April 1972: members of the Provisional IRA destroyed radio equipment used by the Official IRA to broadcast requests for Long Kesh inmates.
- 17 April 1972: A British Army officer and three soldiers were shot and wounded by an IRA unit at Divis Flats, Belfast. A nine-year-old boy was also injured.
- 17 April 1972: A 20-year-old student teacher (Patrick McGee) was killed by the British Army in the course of an exchange of fire with an IRA unit in Divis Flats.
- 19 April 1972: An off-duty UDR soldier, James Elliott (aged 36), was abducted and killed by the IRA near Newtownhamilton, County Armagh. He was found shot dead by the side of the road at Altnamackan, near Newtownhamilton.
- 19 April 1972: A Catholic civilian, Martin Owens (aged 22), was found dead shortly after being thrown from a car, Horn Drive, Suffolk, Belfast.
- 25 April 1972: A British soldier, Joseph Gold (aged 29), died four days after being shot in an IRA gun-attack on a British Army Vehicle Check Point, Donegall Road, Belfast.
- 29 April 1972: A Catholic civilian (Rosaleen Gavin, aged 8) was killed in the crossfire during an IRA sniper attack on the British Army base at Oldpark Road, Belfast.

=== May ===
- 1 May 1972: A man, reported to be an IRA member, was shot and wounded in the legs in a punishment attack in Derry. The IRA claimed he was a thief.
- 3 May 1972: The British Army reported 29 shooting incidents involving the IRA on the previous night. Two soldiers were wounded in the Springfield area of Belfast, while a military observation post was raked with gunfire at Corry's timber yard.
- 4 May 1972: Three RUC officers on a mobile patrol were wounded in an IRA machine gun attack in Derry.
- 9 May 1972: The British Army reported that five IRA members launched 18 small-arms attacks on a military post at Bligh's Lane, Derry.
- 10 May 1972: An IRA bomb set a fire that destroyed the Belfast Co-operative store.
- 11 May 1972: A British soldier (John Ballard, aged 18) was shot dead by an IRA sniper while on patrol, Sultan Street, Lower Falls, Belfast.
- 13 May 1972: An IRA volunteer (John Starrs, aged 19) was shot dead in a gun-battle with the British Army on William Street, Derry City.
- 13 May 1972: A British soldier (Alan Buckley, aged 22) was shot dead in a gun-battle with the IRA in Ballymurphy, Belfast.
- 14 May 1972: A Protestant civilian (John Pedlow, aged 17), died one day after being shot during a gun battle between IRA volunteers and loyalists, Springmartin Road, Belfast.
- 14 May 1972: Two commercial areas of Derry were bombed by the IRA. A four-storey building and a neighbouring shop were set on fire.
- 17 May 1972: A British soldier (Ronald Hurst, aged 25), was shot dead by an IRA sniper while repairing a damaged perimeter fence at the British Army base in Crossmaglen, County Armagh.
- 18 May 1972: A British soldier (John Hillman, aged 28) died three days after being shot by a sniper, Flax Street, Ardoyne, Belfast.
- 20 May 1972: A UDR soldier (Henry Gillespie, aged 32), was shot dead by an IRA sniper while on mobile patrol at Killyliss, near Dungannon, County Tyrone.
- 23 May 1972: A British soldier (Eustace Handley, aged 20) was shot dead by an IRA sniper while on foot-patrol, Springhill Avenue, Ballymurphy, Belfast.
- 26 May 1972: The IRA detonated a car-bomb on Oxford Street in Belfast. A Protestant civilian (Margaret Young, aged 64) was killed in the explosion.
- 28 May 1972: Four IRA volunteers (Joseph Fitzsimmons (aged 17), John McIlhone (aged 17), Edward McDonnell (aged 29), and Martin Engelen (aged 19)), along with four Catholic civilians (Henry Crawford (aged 39), Mary Clarke (aged 27), John Nugent (aged 31), and Geraldine McMahon (aged 17)) were killed when a bomb being prepared detonated prematurely inside a house on Anderson Street, Short Strand, Belfast.
- 30 May 1972: A Protestant civilian, Joan Scott (12), died three days after being shot during an IRA sniper attack on a RUC mobile patrol, Oldpark Road, Belfast.
- 30 May 1972: A British Army soldier, Marcel Doglay (aged 28), was killed when a time bomb exploded inside the Springfield Road RUC/British Army base, Belfast.
- 31 May 1972: A British Army soldier on mobile patrol, Michael Bruce (aged 27), was shot dead by an IRA sniper, Kennedy Way, Andersonstown, Belfast.

=== June ===
- 2 June 1972: Two British Army soldiers, Victor Husband (aged 23) and Brian Robertson (aged 23) were killed by an IRA land mine attack on their foot patrol at Derryvolan, near Rosslea, County Fermanagh.
- 6 June 1972: Two British Army soldiers were killed in separate IRA sniper attacks in Belfast. George Lee (aged 22), shot by sniper while on foot patrol, Ballymurphy Parade, Ballymurphy, Belfast. Charles Coleman (aged 29) was shot by a sniper while on mobile patrol, Tullymore Gardens, Andersonstown, Belfast.
- 8 June 1972: A member of the Garda Síochána, Samuel Donegan (aged 61), was killed when he set off an IRA booby-trap bomb left by the side of a road. He had inadvertently strayed a few yards across the border into Legakelly, near Newtownbutler, County Fermanagh.
- 8 June 1972: A UDR soldier on mobile patrol, Edward Megahey (aged 44), died three days after being shot by an IRA sniper on Buncrana Road, Derry.
- 9 June 1972: An off-duty UDR soldier, Roy Stanton (aged 27), was shot dead as he left his workplace, the Autolite factory on Finaghy Road North, Belfast.
- 11 June 1972: Colonel Muammar al-Gaddafi announced he had supplied arms to "revolutionaries" in Ireland. There were shooting incidents across Belfast and Northern Ireland, including a gun battle between loyalist and republican paramilitaries in the Oldpark area of Belfast. A Catholic civilian (John Madden, aged 24) was shot dead outside his shop on Oldpark Road, Belfast. An Irish Republican Army Youth Section (IRAF) volunteer (Joseph Campbell (aged 16) was shot dead during a gun battle at Eskdale Gardens, Ardoyne, Belfast. A Protestant civilian (Norman McGrath, aged 18) was shot from a passing British Army Armoured Personnel Carrier as he walked along Alloa Street, Lower Oldpark, Belfast. A British soldier (Peter Raistrick, aged 18) was shot dead by an IRA sniper while at the Brooke Park British Army base, Derry.
- 12 June 1972: A British Army soldier, Alan Giles (24), was shot dead by the IRA during a gun-battle in the Ardoyne area of Belfast.
- 17 June 1972: The IRA exploded a 150–200 lb car bomb outside the Woodvale Arms public house at the end of the Shankill Road, Belfast. 18 people were injured in the blast despite a 20-minute warning.
- 18 June 1972: Three British soldiers (Arthur McMillan (aged 37), Ian Mutch (aged 31) and Colin Leslie (aged 26)) were killed in an IRA booby-trap bomb attack. The bomb had been left in a derelict house in Bleary, County Armagh.
- 19 June 1972: An associate of the Official IRA (Desmond Mackin, aged 37) was shot dead by the Provisional IRA during a dispute in the Cracked Cup Social Club, Leeson Street, Lower Falls, Belfast.
- 19 June 1972: A British soldier, Bryan Sodden (aged 21), was shot dead by an IRA sniper while on mobile patrol, Brompton Park, Ardoyne, Belfast.
- 21 June 1972: A British soldier, Kerry McCarthy (aged 19), was shot dead while on sentry duty outside Victoria Royal Ulster Constabulary/British Army base, Derry.
- 24 June 1972: A bomb and gun attack occurred in the early morning of 24 June 1972, in the village of Crabarkey along the main A6 Belfast to Derry road just outside Dungiven. An army Land Rover was escorting a lorry that was transporting a crippled helicopter, damaged in a crash landing, toward RAF Aldergrove in County Antrim. IRA volunteers detonated a 120 pounds (54 kg) bomb hidden in two milk churns as the convoy passed, catching seven soldiers in the blast, killing three and injuring four of them. Immediately after the blast, the IRA opened fire on the lorry that had been following the Land Rover and three more soldiers including a helicopter pilot were injured. The three soldiers killed in the blast were Lance-Corporal David Moon (24) of No. 664 Squadron AAC, Private Christopher Stevenson (24) of the Parachute Regiment and Sergeant Stuart Reid (28) of the Royal Electrical and Mechanical Engineers. Malachy Bernard O'Kane, a farmer, was convicted of the attack and was ordered to serve at least 25 years of a life term. O'Kane was later released from prison and unsuccessfully ran as a Sinn Féin Candidate for Parliament in the 1997 general election.
- 26 June 1972: A British soldier was shot dead by an IRA sniper while on mobile-patrol in the Short Strand area of Belfast.
- 26 June–8 July 1972: The IRA declared a ceasefire in order to allow talks with the British government.
- 27 June 1972: A civilian was shot dead by the IRA after attempting to drive through one of their vehicle checkpoints.

=== July ===
- 4 July 1972: The IRA issued a statement where they reported the death of volunteer Denis Quinn, shot and killed by accident while on an IRA patrol near Coalisland, County Tyrone.
- 7 July 1972: A civilian was shot dead after crashing his car into an IRA roadblock.
- 7 July 1972: Two British Army captains were captured while off duty by an IRA patrol in Derry. The two officers were interrogated and released unharmed 18 hours later. The British Army set up a board of inquiry on the issue.
- 9 July 1972: A UDA member was shot dead by the IRA in the Markets area of Belfast.
- 10 July 1972: Five IRA bombs exploded in commercial areas of Derry, marking the end of the 26 June ceasefire.
- 11 July 1972: A British soldier was shot dead in an IRA gun attack in Derry.
- 13 July 1972: Four British soldiers and an IRA volunteer were killed in various gun-battles across Belfast. The British Army also killed two armed men.
- 14 July 1972: An IRA volunteer was shot dead in a gun battle with the British Army. Also killed in the exchange of fire were three British soldiers, an OIRA volunteer and a civilian. (See: Battle of Lenadoon)
- 15 July 1972: Two British soldiers were killed in separate IRA attacks in Belfast and Silverbridge, in South Armagh. William Whitelaw, Secretary of State for Northern Ireland, speaking at the House of Commons, claimed the IRA had six rocket launchers in its inventory to this date.
- 16 July 1972: Two British soldiers were killed in an IRA landmine attack on their armoured vehicle in Crossmaglen, County Armagh. In Belfast an RUC officer was killed in an IRA gun attack on his patrol car. A member of the IRA Youth Section (Na Fianna), was killed by a rubber bullet fired by security forces in Strabane, County Tyrone.
- 18 July 1972: A British soldier was shot dead by an IRA sniper at the British Army base in Ballymurphy, Belfast. The IRA also shot dead a civilian who attempted to stop a bomb attack on a building in Belfast.
- 18 July 1972: Almost 30 shooting incidents were reported overnight by the British Army between soldiers crewing military outposts and IRA volunteers in the Bogside, Derry.
- 19 July 1972: A five-month-old boy, Alan Jack, was killed when an IRA car bomb exploded on Canal Street in Strabane. He was the youngest victim of the Troubles up to that point.
- 19 July 1972: A Protestant civilian (Henry Gray, aged 71), was shot dead by IRA members while trying to prevent the bombing of a bar in Springfield Road, Belfast.
- 20 July 1972: A Protestant civilian, (Robert Leggett, aged 50) was shot dead attempting to stop an IRA bomb attack on his business premises, Springfield Road, Belfast.
- 21 July 1972: On "Bloody Friday" 22 bombs in Belfast killed two British soldiers, a UDA member and six civilians and injured 130 others. The IRA officially apologised for this set of attacks in 2002. An IRA volunteer was killed in a gun battle with British troops in the Markets area of Belfast.
- 21 July 1972: A number of car bombs exploded in Derry. No casualties were reported.
- 21 July 1972: A train was derailed and the Belfast-Dublin railway was blocked by the explosion of an IRA bomb in Portadown.
- 23 July 1972: A UDR soldier was kidnapped and shot dead by the IRA in the Ardoyne area of Belfast.
- 24 July 1972: A Chinese restaurant was destroyed by an IRA bomb in the Dockside area of Derry. As British troops arrived on the scene they were ambushed by a sniper. One civilian was wounded in the crossfire.
- 24 July 1972: A British soldier was shot dead by an IRA sniper in Ballymurphy, Belfast.
- 26 July 1972: A British soldier was shot dead in an IRA attack on a British foot-patrol in the Unity Flats, Belfast.
- 28 July 1972: An IRA volunteer was shot dead by a British sniper while sitting in a car outside the "Starry Plough Bar" in Belfast.
- 29 July 1972: The IRA opened fire on a British army observation post in the Derry's walls.
- 29 July 1972: A customs caravan and a car showroom were bombed in Derry.
- 31 July 1972: Three car bombs exploded in the Claudy bombings, killing nine people on Claudy High Street near Derry. The IRA have always denied involvement, but they are believed to have been responsible. In Operation Motorman, the biggest British military operation since the Suez crisis, the army used 12,000 soldiers supported by tanks and bulldozers to dismantle barricades and take IRA held "no go areas" in Belfast and Derry.

=== August ===
- 3 August 1972: An IRA volunteer and a British soldier were killed in separate attacks in Belfast and Tyrone.
- 4 August 1972: A British soldier was killed by an IRA sniper while on foot-patrol in the Andersonstown area of Belfast.
- 7 August 1972: Four British soldiers were killed in three separate IRA attacks across Northern Ireland.
- 7 August 1972: The British army claimed that the IRA launched a rocket attack on La Salle school, in Andersontown, Belfast. The building had been converted to be used by the military. The IRA claimed instead that two 50 lb bombs were planted in the facilities.
- 9 August 1972: An IRA volunteer was killed when a bomb exploded accidentally in a garage in Newry.
- 11 August 1972: Two IRA volunteers died when the van bomb they were transporting exploded prematurely in the Lower Falls, Belfast.
- 14 August 1972: Two British soldiers were killed in an IRA booby-trap bomb attack at Casement Park British Army base in Belfast. A civilian was also killed in the crossfire between an IRA unit and a British patrol in the Ardoyne area of Belfast.
- 17 August 1972: A bomb planted by the IRA wrecked a crowded bar at Agnes Street, in Shankill Road. There were 55 injuries and damage to 35 surrounding residences.
- 17 August 1972: A British soldier was shot dead by the IRA in a sniper attack just off the Grosvenor Road in Belfast.
- 18 August 1972: Two British soldiers were killed in separate IRA sniper attacks in Belfast. The first soldier was killed while on mobile patrol at Excise street off the Grosvenor Road, the second soldier was killed at the junction of Beechmount Avenue & the Falls Road while manning a vehicle checkpoint.
- 22 August 1972: The IRA shot dead a member of the Loyalist Association of Workers on Turin Street in Belfast.
- 22 August 1972: Nine people were killed when a bomb exploded prematurely at a customs post in Newry. Among the dead were two lorry drivers, four customs staff, and three IRA volunteers.
- 23 August 1972: A British soldier was shot dead in an IRA sniper attack in the Andersonstown area of Belfast.
- 23 August 1972: A British soldier and four civilians were shot and wounded in Belfast, Hollywood and Lurgan.
- 24 August 1972: A British soldier was killed in an IRA landmine attack on a British mobile-patrol in Crossmaglen, County Armagh.
- 25 August 1972: A British soldier was shot dead by an IRA sniper in the Shantallow area of Derry.
- 26 August 1972: Two UDR soldiers were killed in an IRA remote controlled bomb attack in Cherrymount, County Fermanagh.
- 26 August 1972: Two IRA volunteers died in a premature bomb explosion in Downpatrick, County Down.
- 27 August 1972: A British soldier was shot dead by an IRA sniper in Creggan Heights, Derry.
- 28 August 1972: A British soldier was shot dead in an IRA sniper attack on Beechmount Avenue in Belfast. A civilian was also killed when he triggered a booby-trap bomb near his farm in County Fermanagh. It was reported that the bomb had been intended for soldiers who were patrolling the area following reports of gunfire.
- 30 August 1972: Two British soldiers were killed in separate IRA gun and bomb attacks in Belfast.

=== September ===
- 10 September 1972: three British soldiers were killed in an IRA landmine attack on a British Army armoured personnel carrier near Dungannon, County Tyrone.
- 15 September 1972: a British soldier was shot dead in an IRA sniper attack in the Bogside area of Derry.
- 16 September 1972: British soldiers manning security post within the grounds of the Royal Victoria Hospital trade fire with three IRA units at night. One man was wounded.
- 17 September 1972: an IRA volunteer was shot dead by the British Army during a riot in the Creggan area of Derry.
- 18 September 1972: a British soldier was shot dead in an IRA gun attack while on foot-patrol in the Lecky Road area of Derry.
- 20 September 1972: a British soldier was killed in a gun battle with the IRA on Springhill Avenue in Ballymurphy, Belfast.
- 21 September 1972: a UDR soldier and his wife were killed in an IRA gun attack on their home in Derrylin, County Fermanagh.
- 21 September 1972: IRA commander Eddie Campbell was captured by British troops in a house at Jamaica street.
- 22 September 1972: a British soldier was killed in an IRA sniper attack in Crossmaglen, County Armagh.
- 27 September 1972: a British soldier was killed in an IRA gun attack in Derry. A civilian was killed in an IRA gun attack at the corner of Ligoniel Road and Mill Avenue, Belfast.
- 29 September 1972: an IRA volunteer and a British soldier were killed in a gun-battle in the Lower Falls area of Belfast.
- 30 September 1972: a British soldier was shot dead by an IRA sniper in the Ardoyne area of Belfast.

=== October ===
- 2 October 1972: an undercover British soldier (Edward Stuart, aged 20) was shot dead by the IRA while driving laundry van, Juniper Park, Twinbrook, Belfast.
- 2 October 1972: the IRA kidnapped three alleged informers (Edward Bonner, Kevin McKee and Seamus Wright), who were later killed and buried.
- 6 October 1972: an IRA volunteer (Daniel McAreavey, aged 21) was killed during an IRA attack on a British Army base, Osman Street, Lower Falls, Belfast.
- 10 October 1972: an off-duty UDR soldier (John Ruddy, aged 50) was shot dead by the IRA outside his home at Dromalane Park, Newry, County Down.
- 10 October 1972: three IRA volunteers died (John Donaghy, Patrick Maguire and Joseph McKinney) when a bomb they were assembling exploded in a house, Balkan Street, Lower Falls, Belfast.
- 13 October 1972: an off-duty RUC officer (Robert Nicholl, aged 22) was shot dead by the British army while driving his car along Castle Street in Belfast.
- 18 October 1972: a British soldier (Anthony David, aged 27) died four weeks after being shot by an IRA sniper while on mobile-patrol, Falls Road, Belfast.
- 22 October 1972: an off-duty UDR soldier (John Bell, aged 21) was shot dead by the IRA on his farm at Derrydoon, near Newtownbutler, County Fermanagh.
- 22 October 1972: two barges were bombed and sunk by the IRA at Lough Neagh with a loss of £80,000.
- 24 October 1972: two British soldiers were killed in separate IRA sniper and bomb attacks in Belfast and Armagh.
- 28 October 1972: a British soldier (Thomas McKay, aged 29), was shot dead by an IRA sniper while on foot-patrol on Bishop Street, Derry.
- 31 October 1971: a British soldier (Richard Sinclair, aged 19) was shot dead by an IRA sniper while on foot-patrol, Antrim Road, New Lodge, Belfast.

=== November ===
- 8 November 1972: a UDR soldier (Irwin Long, aged 29) was shot dead by the IRA while driving his car along Lake Street, Lurgan, County Armagh.
- 10 November 1972: a British soldier (Ronald Kitchen, aged 20) was shot dead by the IRA while manning a vehicle checkpoint, Oldpark Road, Belfast.
- 13 November 1972: an IRA volunteer (Stanislaus Carberry, aged 34), was shot dead by the British Army while driving his car along La Salle Drive, near Falls Road, Belfast.
- 14 November 1972: a British soldier (Stanley Evans, aged 19) was shot dead by the IRA as he stood guarding homes being raided by the British Army, Stanhope Street, Unity Flats, Belfast.
- 16 November 1972: an RUC officer (Joseph Calvin, aged 42) was killed by an under-car booby trap bomb which detonated in car park, Quay Lane, Enniskillen, County Fermanagh.
- 20 November 1972: two British soldiers, William Watson (aged 28) and James Strothers (aged 31), were killed by a booby-trap bomb hidden in an abandoned house in Cullyhanna, County Armagh.
- 22 November 1972: an off-duty UDR soldier (Samuel Porter, aged 30) was shot dead by the IRA at his home, Ballinahone, near Maghera, County Londonderry.
- 28 November 1972: the IRA fired 15 rockets at ten security posts throughout Northern Ireland. One RUC officer (Robert Keys, aged 55) was killed in a rocket attack on the RUC/British Army base in Belleek, County Fermanagh. This marks the first recorded use of an RPG-7 by the IRA. Two IRA volunteers, John Brady (aged 21) and James Carr (aged 19), were killed in a premature bomb explosion in the Bogside, Derry. A British Army bomb disposal expert, Paul Jackson (aged 21), was killed while attempting to defuse an IRA bomb, Strand Road, Derry.

=== December ===
- 5 December 1972: the IRA fired 15 rockets and mortars at security posts throughout Northern Ireland. An off-duty UDR soldier (William Bogle, aged 27) was shot dead by the IRA outside a post office, Main Street, Killeter, near Castlederg, County Tyrone.
- 6 December 1972: eleven British soldiers were hurt when their APC was hit by a rocket in the Lower Falls district of Belfast. One of them lost an arm. Another three soldiers were hurt in a gun attack on their APC in the Ballymurphy district of Belfast.
- 7 December 1972: a widowed mother of ten, Jean McConville, was kidnapped and shot dead by an IRA squad, purportedly for being an informer, although her family denied the claim. Her remains were missing for many years until it was recovered and interred next to her late husband. The IRA denied any involvement in the killing until the 1990s, when it issued an acknowledgement and helped to locate the body. An investigation many years later by N.I. Ombudsman Nuala O'Loan found no evidence she had been an informer.
- 8 December 1972: a British soldier (John Joesbury, aged 18) died two days after being shot by the IRA while on mobile patrol, Whiterock Road, Ballymurphy, Belfast.
- 10 December 1972: a British soldier (Stewart Middlemass, aged 33) was killed by a booby-trapped bomb attached to a rocket launcher by the IRA at Fort Monagh British Army, Turf Lodge, Belfast.
- 13 December 1972: an off-duty RUC officer (James Nixon, aged 49) was shot dead by the IRA outside the Chester Park Hotel, Antrim Road, Belfast.
- 16 December 1972: an IRA volunteer (Louis Leonard, aged 26) was shot dead by loyalists at his butchers shop in Derrylin, County Fermanagh.
- 18 December 1972: Ulster Unionist Party councillor, who was also a member of the Police Authority, William Johnston (aged 48), was kidnapped from his home on the Drumarg estate, Armagh. He was found shot dead a short time later at Knockbane, near Middletown, County Armagh.
- 20 December 1972: an off-duty UDR soldier (George Hamilton, aged 28) was shot dead by the IRA at his workplace, a building site at Kildoag, Claudy, County Londonderry.
- 24 December 1972: a British soldier (Colin Harker, aged 23) died three months after being shot by an IRA sniper on Lecky Road, Derry. He was injured on 14 September 1972.
- 27 December 1972: an IRA volunteer (Eugene Devlin, aged 22) was killed by the British Army during an attempted sniper attack on their patrol on Townsend Street, Strabane, County Tyrone.
- 28 December 1972: an IRA volunteer (James McDaid, aged 30) was shot dead by the British Army while walking across a field at Ballyarnet, County Londonderry.

== 1973 ==
- 1 January 1973: a rocket hit Springfield Road RUC base in Belfast, injuring two people. The following night, another rocket was fired at Beragh RUC base, County Tyrone. It missed the target and hit an unoccupied house nearby.
- 4 January 1973: a UDR soldier (James Hood, aged 48) was shot dead by the IRA outside his home in Straidarran, near Feeny, County Londonderry.
- 5 January 1973: a civilian (Trevor Rankin, aged 18) was shot dead by the IRA outside a Ben Madigan filling station, Shore Road, Belfast. He had been mistaken for an off-duty UDR soldier.
- 14 January 1973: three RUC constables (David Dorsett, Henry Sandford, and Mervyn Wilson) were killed in separate IRA bomb attacks in Cappagh and Derry City.
- 15 January 1973: an off-duty UDR soldier (David Bingham, aged 22) was kidnapped while driving his car along Grosvenor Road, Belfast, and shot dead by the IRA. His body was found the next day, 16 January, in an abandoned car on Institution Place, off Durham Street, Belfast.
- 18 January 1973: an IRA volunteer (Francis Liggett, aged 25) was shot dead by the British Army during an attempted robbery in the grounds of the Royal Victoria Hospital in Belfast.
- 18 January 1973: a Soviet-made anti-rocket was fired to a British Army outpost in the junction of Louisa Street and Oldpark Road, Belfast. This was the second rocket attack in the district since the IRA add this weapon to its inventory.
- 25 January 1973: William Staunton (aged 46), a resident magistrate died of his injuries three months after being shot on 11 October 1972 outside St Dominic's School, Falls Road, Belfast.
- 26 January 1973: a UDR Land Rover was hit by an IRA grenade and gunfire near Whitecross, County Armagh. Three soldiers were hurt. Another soldier was badly wounded by a sniper while patrolling in Lurgan, County Armagh.
- 30 January 1973: a UDA member, Francis Smith (aged 28), was kidnapped and shot dead by the IRA near Rodney Parade, Belfast, allegedly in response to the killing by loyalists of a 15-year-old Catholic boy (Peter Watterson), the previous day.
- 1 February 1973: a British soldier (William Boardley, aged 30) was shot dead in an IRA sniper attack while he was manning a Vehicle Check Point (VCP) on Meeting House Street, Strabane, County Tyrone.
- 2 February 1973: James Greer (aged 21), a Protestant civilian, was shot at his workplace, a paint store, off Springfield Road, Belfast. Reason remains unknown. The body of Patrick Brady, a member of the Catholic Ex-Servicemen's Association, was found the same day in an abandoned car, Maurice Street, off Springfield Road, Belfast.
- 2 February 1973: a UDA member (Robert Burns, aged 18), was killed in an IRA drive-by gun attack on the Oldpark Road, Belfast.
- 4 February 1973: an IRA volunteer (Anthony Campbell, aged 19) and three Catholic civilians, Ambrose Hardy (26), Brendan Maguire (33), and John Loughran (35), were shot dead by British Army snipers in New Lodge, Belfast.
- 6 February 1973: a British soldier (Michael Murtagh, aged 22) was killed in an IRA rocket attack on an Armoured Personnel Carrier, Servia Street, Lower Falls, Belfast.
- 7 February 1973: a UDA member (Glenn Clarke, aged 18) was kidnapped by the IRA and later found shot dead off Hallidays Road, New Lodge, Belfast.
- 8 February 1973: an RUC officer (Charles Morrison, aged 26) was shot dead by an IRA sniper while sitting in stationary patrol car in Dungannon, County Tyrone.
- 10 February 1973: two IRA volunteers, Leonard O'Hanlon (aged 23) and Vivienne Fitzsimmons (aged 17), were killed when a bomb they were assembling exploded prematurely in the grounds of Castleward National Trust Estate, near Strangford, County Down.
- 14 February 1973: a British soldier (Edwin Weston, aged 20) was shot dead by an IRA while patrolling the Divis Flats complex, West Belfast.
- 20 February 1973: two British soldiers, Malcolm Shaw (aged 23) and Robert Pearson (aged 19), were shot dead when their mobile-patrol was ambushed by IRA snipers in Cupar Street, Lower Falls, Belfast.
- 21 February 1973: a British soldier (Michael Doyle, aged 20) was killed in an IRA gun attack on Fort Pegasus British Army base, Whiterock, Belfast.
- 25 February 1973: a child, Gordon Gallagher (aged 9), was killed after he accidentally triggered an IRA booby trap bomb which had been planted at the rear of his home, Leenan Gardens, Creggan, Derry.
- 27 February 1973: two RUC officers, Raymond Wylie (aged 25) and Ronald Macauley (42) were shot dead while on mobile patrol during an IRA sniper attack at Aghagallon, south Antrim.
- 28 February 1973: a British soldier (Alan Kennington, aged 20) was killed in an IRA gun attack while on foot-patrol, Crumlin Road, Ardoyne, Belfast.
- 3 March 1973: an off-duty UDR soldier (David Deacon, aged 39) was shot dead by the IRA in Mullennan, County Londonderry.
- 4 March 1973: a British soldier (Gary Barlow, aged 19) was tortured and later shot dead after being abducted by the IRA while his Army unit was raiding homes on Albert Street, Lower Falls, Belfast.
- 6 March 1973: a British soldier (Anton Brown, aged 22) was shot dead by an IRA sniper while patrolling Whitecliff Crescent, Ballymurphy, Belfast. Another British soldier (Joseph Leahy, aged 31) was wounded by an IRA booby-trap bomb planted in a derelict house in Mullaghbawn, near Forkill, County Armagh. He died two days later, on 8 March 1973.
- 8 March 1973: the Provisional IRA conducted its first operation in England, planting four car bombs in London. Two bombs exploded, killing one person and injuring 265 others. Ten members of the IRA team, including Gerry Kelly and sisters Dolours and Marian Price, were arrested at Heathrow Airport trying to leave the country.
- 8 March 1973: a British soldier (John Green, aged 21) was shot dead by the IRA while guarding a polling station, Slate Street School, Lower Falls, Belfast.
- 13 March 1973: a British soldier (John King, aged 22) was killed by an IRA booby trap bomb while on foot-patrol at Coolderry, near Crossmaglen, County Armagh.
- 16 March 1973: an off-duty UDR soldier driving his car (William Kenny, aged 28) was kidnapped by the IRA at Halliday's Road, New Lodge, Belfast. Found shot dead a short time later in entry off Edlingham Street, New Lodge.
- 17 March 1973: a British soldier (Michael Gay, aged 21) was killed in an IRA landmine attack on his armoured patrol at Parkanaur, near Dungannon, County Tyrone.
- 17 March 1973: IRA bomb exploded in the Spar Supermarket, William Street, Lurgan.
- 23 March 1973: three British soldiers, Barrington Foster (aged 28), Michael Muldoon (aged 25), and Thomas Penrose (aged 28), were shot dead by the IRA in a house on Antrim Road, Belfast, to which the soldiers had been lured.
- 26 March 1973: the IRA fired four rockets at British Army and RUC targets. One was fired at a British Saracen APC near the border, one at an RUC Land Rover near the border and another at a British Army patrol in Belfast.
- 27 March 1973: a British soldier (Andrew Somerville, aged 20) was killed in an IRA landmine attack on a British mobile patrol in Ballymacilroy, near Ballygawley, County Tyrone.
- 27 March 1973: Patrick McCabe (aged 16), a member of the Irish Republican Army Youth Section, was shot dead by a British Army sniper while walking along Etna Drive, Ardoyne, Belfast.
- 29 March 1973: a British soldier (Michael Marr, aged 33) was shot dead by an IRA sniper while on foot patrol in Andersonstown, Belfast.
- 7 April 1973: two British soldiers, Terence Brown (aged 26) and Steven Harrison (aged 26), were killed in an IRA landmine attack on a British armoured mobile patrol at Tullyogallaghan, near Newtownhamilton, County Armagh.
- 9 April 1973: a British soldier (Charles Marchant, aged 18) was shot dead by an IRA sniper while on foot patrol on North Street, Lurgan, County Armagh. He had previously been injured on 26 January 1973, also in Lurgan.
- 11 April 1973: a British soldier (Keith Evans, aged 20) was shot dead by an IRA sniper while on foot-patrol on Westland Street in the Bogside, Derry.
- 12 April 1973: an IRA volunteer (Edward O'Rawe, aged 27) was shot dead by the British Army at the rear of a house on Cape Street, Lower Falls, Belfast.
- 17 April 1973: an IRA volunteer (Brian Smyth, aged 32) was shot dead by a British Army sniper while standing with group of men, Etna Drive, Ardoyne, Belfast.
- 19 April 1973: a Catholic civilian (Anthony McDowell, aged 12) was shot dead by the British Army during a gun battle between British Army and the IRA, Alliance Avenue, Ardoyne, Belfast.
- 20 April 1973: a British soldier was shot by an IRA sniper in New Lodge, Belfast, but survived. A British post was hit by a rocket and then raked with gunfire in Ballymurphy, Belfast. There were no other casualties.
- 28 April 1973: a British soldier (Kerry Venn, aged 23) was shot dead by an IRA sniper while on foot-patrol, Carn Hill, Shantallow, Derry City.
- 29 April 1973: a British soldier, Graham Cox (aged 19), was shot dead by an IRA sniper while on mobile-patrol, New Lodge Road, New Lodge, Belfast.
- 3 May 1973: a British soldier (Thomas Crump, aged 27) died one day after being shot by an IRA sniper while on foot-patrol at the junction of Foyle Road and Bishop Street, Derry City.
- 5 May 1973: three British soldiers (John Gibbons, William Vines, and Terence Williams) were killed by a booby trap landmine attack on their foot patrol at Moybane, near Crossmaglen, County Armagh.
- 10 May 1973: an off-duty UDR soldier, Franklin Caddoo (aged 24) was shot dead by the IRA at his farm at Rehaghy, near Aughnacloy, County Tyrone.
- 10 May 1973: an IRA volunteer, Anthony Ahern, a native of County Cork, was killed when a landmine he was preparing at Mullanahinch, near Rosslea, County Fermanagh, exploded prematurely.
- 13 May 1973: two British soldiers, Thomas Taylor (aged 26) and John Gaskell (aged 22), were killed when the IRA detonated a remote-controlled bomb as their foot patrol passed by a disused factory on the Donegall Road, Belfast.
- 13 May 1973: in County Tyrone, an IRA volunteer, Kevin Kilpatrick (aged 21), was shot dead when he attempted to smash his car through a UDR Vehicle Check Point (VCP) on The Diamond, near Coagh.
- 14 May 1973: a civilian, Roy Rutherford (aged 33), was killed after triggering an IRA booby-trap bomb, intended for the security forces; the bomb had been hidden in a derelict cottage on Moy Road, Portadown, County Armagh.
- 17 May 1973: four off-duty British Army soldiers (Barry Cox, Arthur Place, Derek Reed, and Sheridan Young) were killed by a booby trap bomb while getting into a car outside the Knock-na-Moe Castle Hotel, Omagh, County Tyrone; a fifth soldier (Frederick Drake) died of his injuries on 3 June.
- 18 May 1973: an IRA volunteer (Sean McKee, aged 17) was shot dead by the British Army while carrying out a sniper attack on a British patrol on Fairfield Street, Ardoyne, Belfast.
- 24 May 1973: two British soldiers, John Wallace (aged 32) and Ian Donald (aged 35), were killed in an IRA remote-controlled bomb attack as they searched houses in Cullaville, County Armagh.
- 26 May 1973: Paul Crummey (aged 4) was killed during an IRA sniper attack on a British Army foot patrol on Finaghy Road North, Belfast.
- 5 June 1973: the IRA shot dead a patrolling RUC officer (David Purvis, aged 22) on Belmore Street, Enniskillen, County Fermanagh.
- 5 June 1973: a civilian, Terence Herdman (aged 17) was found shot dead near Clogher, County Tyrone. The IRA claimed he was an informer.
- 12 June 1973: six Protestant civilians (Francis and Dinah Campbell, Elizabeth Craigmile, Nan Davis, Robert Scott and Elizabeth Palmer) were killed by an IRA car bomb on Railway Road in Coleraine, County Londonderry; the warning given by the IRA had been inadequate.
- 21 June 1973: a British soldier (Barry Gritten, aged 29) was killed by an IRA booby-trap bomb in an empty building on Lecky Road, Bogside, Derry.
- 21 June 1973: a British soldier (David Smith, aged 31) was killed by an IRA booby-trap bomb in an empty building in Strabane.
- 25 June 1973: three IRA volunteers (Patrick Carty, Dermot Crowley, and Sean Loughran) were killed when the bomb they were transporting exploded prematurely in their car on Gortin Road near Omagh, County Tyrone.
- 26 June 1973: the IRA shot dead a civilian (Noorbaz Khan, aged 45) who worked for the British Army as he left Bligh's Lane British Army Base, Derry.
- 1 July 1973: an IRA sniper shot dead a patrolling British soldier (Reginald Roberts, aged 25) at Bull Ring, Ballymurphy, Belfast.
- 4 July 1973: a British base in Derry was hit by two rockets and raked with gunfire. Another rocket exploded against the fence of a British base in Belfast, hurting two people. Two British patrols were ambushed elsewhere in Belfast and two people injured in the crossfire.
- 10 July 1973: the IRA shot dead a former UDR soldier (Isaac Scott, aged 41) outside Tully's Bar in Belleek, County Armagh, near Newtownhamilton.
- 11 July 1973: a rocket was fired at a British post guarding a gasworks in Derry. It hit an anti-rocket screen but there were no casualties. The IRA claimed responsibility.
- 17 July 1973: two British soldiers, Christopher Brady (aged 21) and Geoffrey Breakwell (aged 20), were killed by an IRA booby-trap bomb in an electricity junction box at Divis Flats, Belfast.
- 18 July 1973: a patrolling British soldier (Brian Criddle, aged 34) was wounded by an IRA landmine near Clogher, County Tyrone. He died four days later, on 22 July 1973.
- 20 July 1973: a patrolling British soldier (Richard Jarman, aged 37) was killed by an IRA booby-trap bomb in Middletown, County Armagh.
- 20 July 1973: the IRA shot dead an off-duty UDR soldier (Sidney Watt, aged 36) outside his home in Ballintemple, near Meigh, County Armagh.
- 21 July 1973: two IRA volunteers were killed when the bomb they were transporting exploded prematurely in their car in Newcastle, County Down.
- 3 August 1973: IRA members, carrying out an armed robbery, shot dead a Catholic civilian, James Farrell (aged 50), who was delivering wages to the British Leyland factory on Cashel Road, Dublin.
- 11 August 1973: an IRA volunteer died when the bomb he was transporting exploded prematurely in a car at Kilclean, County Donegal.
- 11 August 1973: an IRA assault team consisting of over 20 volunteers surrounded Crossmaglen RUC barracks. The barracks was hit with rockets, mortars and machine gun fire. The RUC fired a large number of shots at the unit. There were no serious injuries on either side.
- 13 August 1973: the IRA shot dead an off-duty RUC reservist (William McIlveen, aged 36) at his workplace, a factory on Cathedral Road, Armagh town.
- 16 August 1973: two IRA volunteers, Daniel McAnallen (aged 27) and Patrick Quinn (aged 18), were killed when a mortar prematurely exploded during an attack on Pomeroy British Army/RUC base in County Tyrone.
- 18 August 1973: a Protestant civilian (Trevor Holland, aged 36) was shot dead by the IRA from a passing car while he was standing outside a cafe on West Street, Edgarstown, Portadown.
- 18 August 1973: two IRA firebombs exploded at Harrods Department store in London causing slight damage.
- 20 August 1973: book bombs were sent to a number of places in London including the Old Bailey and the Union Jack Club. Ten incendiary devices were also defused in London's West End.
- 22 August 1973: an IRA book bomb exploded at the Conservative Party Central Office in London.
- 23 August 1973: the IRA shot dead a Protestant civilian (Margaret Meeke, aged 52) as she drove her car at Tullyvallan, near Newtownhamilton, County Armagh; the sniper mistook her car for that of a UDR soldier.
- 24 August 1973: a civilian (Patrick Duffy, aged 37) was found shot dead in a car on Buncrana Road, Derry. The IRA said he had been shot for being an informer.
- 24 August 1973: one person was injured when an IRA letterbomb exploded at the London Stock Exchange.
- 25 August 1973: one person was maimed when an IRA letterbomb exploded at the Bank of England in London. That same day, an IRA bomb was also defused in Oxford Street, Belfast.
- 25 August 1973: the IRA shot an undercover British soldier (Richard Miller, aged 21) outside Royal Victoria Hospital, Falls Road, Belfast. He died on 18 September 1973.
- 27 August 1973: a secretary at the British Embassy in Washington DC was seriously injured by the explosion of a letter bomb. The IRA claimed responsibility.
- 27 August 1973: the IRA destroyed The Royal Bastion monument to British Governor Walker in Derry with a large bomb.
- 28 August 1973: the IRA shot dead a UDR soldier (Kenneth Hill, aged 25) in the Culdee section of Armagh town while evacuating the area during a bomb alert.
- 29 August 1973: two IRA bombs exploded in a shopping centre in Solihull, England. A building society was extensively damaged.
- 30 August 1973: a British Army officer (Ronald Beckett, aged 36) was killed while trying to defuse an IRA bomb at Tullyhommon Post Office, near Pettigoe, County Fermanagh.
- 30 August 1973: two IRA volunteers, Francis Hall (aged 29) and Anne Marie Petticrew (aged 19), were fatally wounded in a premature explosion in a house on Elaine Street, Stranmillis, Belfast. Hall died on 30 August and Petticrew died on 1 September.
- 31 August 1973: one IRA volunteer (Patrick Mulvenna, aged 19) was killed and another fatally wounded in a shootout with the British Army, Ballymurphy Road, Ballymurphy, Belfast. The other IRA volunteer (James Bryson, aged 25) died on 22 September 1973.
- 2 September 1973: Three RUC officers were ambushed near Castlebar, County Mayo. Although shot, all three survived and were transferred back to Enniskillen under heavy police guard.
- 5 September 1973: a Catholic civilian (Patrick Duffy, aged 21) was killed when he triggered a booby-trap bomb by driving his tractor into a field at a farm at Greaghnagleragh, near Belcoo, County Fermanagh. It is believed it was planted by the IRA and intended for the security forces. The RUC had just removed a dummy bomb at the scene.
- 5 September 1973: a large office compound was destroyed by an IRA bomb at York Street, Belfast.
- 7 September 1973: the IRA shot dead an off-duty UDR soldier (Matthew Lilley, aged 54) near Belcoo, County Fermanagh.
- 8 September 1973: an IRA bomb exploded at the ticket office in Victoria Station, London, injuring five people.
- 10 September 1973: the IRA detonated bombs at two train stations in London; 13 people were injured.
- 12 September 1973: two police officers were injured when an IRA bomb exploded at the offices of the Royal Naval Association in London. A woman collapsed and died during an evacuation following a hoax bomb alert at Euston Station, London.
- 17 September 1973: a British Army bomb disposal expert (Ronald Wilkinson, aged 30) was wounded attempting to defuse an IRA bomb which had been planted in Birmingham, England; he died on 23 September 1973. Another IRA bomb was discovered at a Household Cavalry camp in Surrey.
- 20 September 1973: five people were injured when an IRA bomb exploded at the headquarters of the Duke of York in London.
- 22 September 1973: a civilian (James Brown, aged 26) was found shot dead on Foyle Road, Derry; the IRA claimed he was an informer.
- 2 October 1973: an IRA incendiary bomb caused extensive damage to a department store in Colchester, Essex; another IRA firebomb caused damage at Heathrow Airport.
- 3 October 1973: a British soldier (Lindsay Dobie, aged 23) was killed by a booby-trap bomb in a parcel left at Bligh's Lane British Army Base, Derry.
- 3 October 1973: the IRA shot dead a former UDR soldier (Ivan Vennard, aged 32) in Lurgan, County Armagh.
- 4 October 1973: four people were injured when an IRA bomb exploded at a British Army careers office in London.
- 12 October 1973: a civilian (Raymond McAdam, aged 24), killed in an IRA bomb attack on a shop in Annaghmore, near Newtownbutler, County Fermanagh.
- 16 October 1973: the IRA shot dead a patrolling RUC officer (William Campbell, aged 27), near Capital Cinema, Antrim Road, Belfast.
- 28 October 1973: an IRA sniper shot dead a patrolling British soldier (Stephen Hall, aged 27) in Crossmaglen, County Armagh.
- 28 October 1973: the IRA shot dead an off-duty RUC officer (John Doherty, aged 31, a native of County Donegal), near his mother's home in Lifford, County Donegal.
- 31 October 1973: Mountjoy Prison helicopter escape. Three IRA volunteers escaped from Mountjoy Prison, Dublin after a hijacked helicopter landed in the exercise yard. One of the escapees was former IRA Chief of Staff Seamus Twomey.
- 6 November 1973: an IRA sniper shot dead a patrolling British soldier (John Aikman, aged 25) in Newtownhamilton, County Armagh.
- 13 November 1973: a civilian (Bernard Teggart, aged 15) was found shot near Floral Hall, Zoological Gardens, Antrim Road, Belfast. The IRA claimed he was an informer.
- 14 November 1973: a civilian (John Lundy, aged 61) was killed during an IRA sniper attack on a British Army observation post on Moira Street, Short Strand, Belfast.
- 14 November 1973: a civilian (Kathleen Feeney, aged 14) was killed during an IRA sniper attack on a British Army patrol on Lecky Road, Derry.
- 15 November 1973: the RUC shot dead an IRA volunteer (Michael McVerry, aged 23) during a gun attack on Keady British Army (BA)/Royal Ulster Constabulary (RUC) base in County Armagh.
- 18 November 1973: IRA snipers fired shots at a Saracen armoured vehicle in the Clonard area, at two British Army patrol in Low Ormeau and at an RUC station at Glengormey, all the locations in Belfast.
- 24 November 1973: a patrolling British soldier (David Roberts, aged 25) was killed by an IRA landmine near Carlingford Street, Crossmaglen, County Armagh.
- 24 November 1973: the British Army shot dead a Fianna (IRA Youth Section) volunteer (Michael Marley, aged 17) during a bomb attack on a British Army patrol at Divis Flats, Belfast.
- 25 November 1973: the IRA shot dead two patrolling British soldiers (Joseph Brooks, aged 20, and Heinz Pisarek, aged 30), at Rossville Flats, Bogside, Derry. Six rockets and heavy gunfire hit Belleek RUC base in County Fermanagh. The attack came from across the border.
- 26 November 1973: the IRA shot dead a civilian (Anthony Braden, aged 58) who was driving his car along Jamaica Street, Ardoyne, Belfast.
- 27 November 1973: the British Army shot dead an IRA volunteer (Desmond Morgan, aged 18) as he tried to hijack a car in Coalisland, County Tyrone.
- 1 December 1973: an IRA sniper shot dead a patrolling RUC officer (Robert Megaw, aged 29) on Edward Street, Lurgan, County Armagh.
- 3 December 1973: the British Army shot dead an IRA volunteer (Joseph Walker, aged 18), who was part of a unit attempting to ambush a British patrol at The Rath, Central Drive, Creggan, Derry.
- 10 December 1973: an IRA sniper shot dead a patrolling British soldier (James Hesketh, aged 21) on Leeson Street, Lower Falls, Belfast.
- 11 December 1973: an off-duty RUC officer (Maurice Rolston, aged 37) was killed by an IRA booby-trap bomb attached to his car at his home in Newcastle, County Down. Another under-car bomb blew-off an unidentified RUC officer's leg in Downpatrick, County Down. Belcoo RUC base in County Fermanagh was attacked with rockets and machine-guns, wounding one officer.
- 15 December 1973: the IRA shot dead a former RUC officer (Ivan Johnston, aged 34) at Derrynoose near Keady, County Armagh.
- 15 December 1973: an IRA volunteer (James McGinn, aged 20) died when the bomb he was carrying exploded prematurely as he walked across Clady Bridge on the Tyrone-Donegal border.
- 18 December 1973: the IRA carried out a series of attacks in London. In one attack, two police officers were injured in an explosion in Ronan Way. More than fifty were injured (two seriously) when a bomb exploded on Thorney Street (an inaccurate telephone warning was called in), and six others were injured when a bomb exploded at a postal sorting office.
- 19 December 1973: one person was injured when an IRA letterbomb exploded at a postal sorting office in London.
- 20 December 1973: the IRA accidentally shot dead a civilian (Rodney Fenton, aged 23) on Atlantic Avenue, New Lodge, Belfast; an RUC reservist was the intended target.
- 23 December 1973: In a number of incidents bombs exploded at Kensington police station, Hammersmith offices of builders, George Wimpey and the White Lion public house on Tottenham Court Road.
- 24 December 1973: the IRA left two packages which exploded almost simultaneously in the late evening on Christmas Eve. One was in the doorway of the North Star public house, South Hampstead, which exploded injuring six people, and the other exploded on the upstairs veranda of the nearby Swiss Cottage Tavern, in which an unspecified number of people were injured.
- 24 December 1973: two IRA volunteers (Edward Grant and Brendan Quinn) died, killing one civilian (Aubrey Harshaw), when their bomb prematurely exploded in Clarke's Bar, Monaghan Street, Newry.
- 26 December 1973: one person was injured when an IRA bomb exploded at Stage Door public house in London.
- 31 December 1973: an IRA sniper shot dead a British soldier (Alan Daughtery, aged 23) travelling in an APC on Beechmount Avenue, near Falls Road, Belfast.

== 1974 ==
- 1 January 1974: A Catholic civilian (John Whyte, aged 24) was shot dead during an IRA sniper attack on a British Army patrol on McClure Street, off Ormeau Road, Belfast.
- 3 January 1974: A 10-lb bomb exploded in London at the home of Major General Philip Ward, General Officer commander of the London district. The building was heavily damaged. The IRA is suspected.
- 17 January 1974: The IRA shot dead an off-duty UDR soldier (Robert Jameson, aged 22) near his home at Trillick, County Tyrone.
- 20 January 1974: A UDR soldier (Cormac McCabe, aged 42) was shot dead by the IRA; his body was found in a field near Aughnacloy, County Tyrone.
- 21 January 1974: A British soldier (John Haughey, aged 32) was killed by an IRA remote-controlled bomb hidden in an electricity distribution box on Lone Moor Road, Creggan, Derry. It was detonated when a British foot-patrol passed.
- 23 January 1974: An IRA unit which included Rose Dugdale and Eddie Gallagher hijacked a helicopter and used it to drop bombs on Strabane RUC station. One of the bombs landed on the grounds of the station, but failed to explode.
- 25 January 1974: A British soldier (Howard Fawley, aged 19) was killed by an IRA landmine as he and his patrol searched a field at Ballymaguigan, near Ballyronan, County Londonderry.
- 26 January 1974: The IRA shot dead a patrolling RUC officer (John Rodgers, aged 50) on Antrim Road, Glengormley, County Antrim.
- 29 January 1974: An IRA sniper fired at a bus carrying Royal Air Force (RAF) personnel at Shimna Parade, Newcastle, County Down. The RAF personnel returned fire, killing an elderly civilian, Matilda Withrington (aged 79).
- 29 January 1974: The IRA shot dead a patrolling RUC officer (William Baggley, aged 43) on Dungiven Road, Derry.
- 2 February 1974: An IRA unit fired small arms and six rocket propelled grenades at an RUC outpost near Belcoo, County Fermanagh. The British army returned fire.
- 4 February 1974: Twelve people were killed in the M62 Coach Bombing, when a bomb exploded on a coach as it was travelling along the M62 motorway at Birkenshaw, England. The dead included eight soldiers, and the wife and two young children of one of the soldiers.
- 18 February 1974: A British soldier (Allan Brammagh, aged 31) was killed by an IRA booby-trap bomb hidden in a parcel which was left at the side of the road, while on foot-patrol at Moybane, near Crossmaglen, County Armagh.
- 23 February 1974: A large gun battle between the IRA and the British army occurred near Strabane, County Tyrone. The engagement also involved mortar rounds fired by the IRA. Some 25 traveller caravans were trapped between the warring factions; one caravan was destroyed by a mortar bomb.
- 24 February 1974: A civilian (Patrick Lynch, aged 23) was found shot dead at Rathlin Drive, Derry. He was killed by the IRA as an alleged informer.
- 2 March 1974: The IRA shot dead a patrolling RUC officer (Thomas McClinton, aged 28) on Donegall Street, Belfast.
- 3 March 1974: An IRA landmine exploded and killed a UDR soldier (Robert Moffett, aged 30) at Dunnamore, near Cookstown, County Tyrone.
- 10 March 1974: Two civilians, Michael McCreesh (aged 15) and Michael Gallagher (aged 18), were killed by an IRA booby-trap bomb hidden in an abandoned car at Dromintee, near Forkill, County Armagh. It was meant for a British foot-patrol. Gallagher died on 14 March 1974.
- 12 March 1974: A Fine Gael senator, Billy Fox, was kidnapped by the IRA and later found shot dead at Tircooney, near Clones, County Monaghan.
- 13 March 1974: The IRA shot dead a British soldier (David Farrington, aged 23) at a pedestrian checkpoint on Chapel Lane, Belfast.
- 15 March 1974: Two IRA volunteers, Patrick McDonald (aged 21) and Kevin Murray (aged 27), were killed when their landmine prematurely exploded on Aughnacloy Road, Dungannon, County Tyrone.
- 15 March 1974: A civilian (Adam Johnston, aged 34) was killed by an IRA lorry bomb on Queen Street in Magherafelt, County Londonderry. The warning sent by the IRA had been inadequate.
- 16 March 1974: IRA snipers shot dead two patrolling British soldiers, Roy Bedford (aged 22) and Philip James (aged 22), at Moybane, near Crossmaglen, County Armagh.
- 17 March 1974: An IRA sniper shot dead a patrolling RUC officer (Cyril Wilson, aged 37) in Rathmore, Craigavon, County Armagh.
- 17 March 1974: An IRA sniper shot dead a patrolling British soldier (Michael Ryan, aged 23), on Foyle Road, Brandywell, Derry.
- 19 March 1974: An off-duty RUC officer (Frederick Robinson, aged 40), was killed by a booby trap bomb attached to his car outside his home on Glenkeen Avenue, Greenisland, County Antrim.
- 21 March 1974: An IRA sniper shot a patrolling British soldier (James Macklin, aged 28), on Antrim Road, Belfast. He died on 28 March.
- 23 March 1974: The IRA shot dead a former British soldier from Northern Ireland (Donald Farrell, aged 56), while he was sitting in a stationary car near his home at Mountfield, near Omagh, County Tyrone. He had recently retired.
- 26 March 1974: A civilian (Joseph Hughes, aged 25), was killed when an IRA car bomb exploded on Springfield Road, Ballymurphy, Belfast. He had been driving past at the time.
- 31 March 1974, a civilian (Sean McAstocker, aged 28), was found shot dead, Lagan Street, Markets, Belfast. The IRA were responsible.
- 1 April 1974: It was reported that "small arms fire, mortar bombs and possibly rockets were used" in an attack on a British base in Derry. Two British soldiers were injured.
- 9 April 1974: The IRA shot dead John Stevenson, a Commanding Officer of the British Army, at his home near Otterburn British Army base, Northumberland, England.
- 10 April 1974: The IRA shot dead a former UDR soldier (George Saunderson, aged 58), at his workplace, Derrylin Primary School in Derrylin, County Fermanagh.
- 11 April 1974: A patrolling British soldier (Norman McKenzie, aged 25) was killed by an IRA land mine attack while on mobile patrol at Mullynaburtlan, near Lisnaskea, County Fermanagh.
- 11 April 1974: A patrolling UDR soldier (David Sinnamon, aged 34), was killed by a remote controlled bomb, hidden in a derelict house which detonated when an Ulster Defence Regiment foot patrol passed by in Dungannon, County Tyrone.
- 14 April 1974: The IRA shot dead an undercover British soldier (Anthony Pollen, aged 27), observing a republican commemoration parade at Meenan Square, Bogside, Derry.
- 16 April 1974: An IRA sniper shot dead an RUC officer (Thomas McCall, aged 34), outside Newtownhamilton RUC base in County Armagh.
- 18 April 1974: A civilian (Seamus O'Neill, aged 32), was killed when he triggered a booby-trap bomb on his farm, The Loup, near Moneymore, County Londonderry. It exploded about 8 ft from his tractor as he drove past Saltersland church hall. There had been a small explosion there earlier in the day. It is believed both bombs were planted by the IRA and that the second bomb was for security forces investigating the first.
- 20 April 1974: A civilian (James Corbett, aged 20), was shot dead by the IRA as an alleged informer. His body was found by the side of Upper Springfield Road, Hannahstown, Belfast.
- 22 April 1974: A civilian (Mohammed Khalid, aged 18), who worked for the British Army was shot dead by the IRA in his car at Silverbridge, County Armagh.
- 1 May 1974: A British outpost came under IRA attack at Crossmaglen, County Armagh. It was hit by three rockets and a 15-minute gun-battle followed. No injuries were reported.
- 2 May 1974: Up to 40 members from the Provisional IRA East Tyrone Brigade attacked the isolated 6 UDR Deanery base in Clogher, County Tyrone with machine gun and RPG fire resulting in the death of Private Eva Martin, a UDR Greenfinch, the first female UDR soldier to be killed by enemy action.
- 10 May 1974: The IRA shot dead two patrolling RUC officers, Brian Bell (aged 29) and John Ross (aged 40), on Finaghy Road North, Finaghy, Belfast.
- 13 May 1974: Two IRA volunteers, Eugene Martin (aged 18) and Sean McKearney (aged 19), were killed when their bomb prematurely exploded at a petrol filling station, Donnydeade, near Dungannon, County Tyrone.
- 18 May 1974: The IRA is blamed of a car bomb that exploded at Heathrow airport; three people were wounded and about 50 cars destroyed.
- 31 May 1974: A former Royal Navy serviceman, Alfred Shotter (aged 54), was killed by an IRA booby trap bomb hidden in a dustbin at his former home, Strabane Old Road, Gobnascale, Derry. It is believed to have been planted by the IRA.
- 5 June 1974: An IRA sniper shot dead a patrolling British soldier (Frederick Dicks, aged 21) on Irish Street, Dungannon, County Tyrone.
- 17 June 1974: A bomb exploded at the Houses of Parliament in London, causing extensive damage and injuring 11 people.
- 18 June 1974: A patrolling RUC officer (John Forsythe, aged 30) was killed by an IRA booby-trap bomb in an entry off Market Street, Lurgan, County Armagh.
- 22 June 1974: RUC officer Daniel O'Connor (aged 35) was shot dead from a passing car driven by IRA volunteers while on foot patrol at the junction of Crumlin Road and Clifton Park Avenue, Belfast.
- 22 June 1974: An IRA sniper shot dead a patrolling British soldier (Kim Ian McCunn, aged 18), New Lodge Road, Belfast.
- 24 June 1974: Two IRA volunteers, Gerard Craig (aged 17) and David Russell (aged 18), died when the bomb they were planting at a supermarket, Greenhaw Road, Shantallow, Derry, exploded prematurely.
- 29 June 1974: An IRA sniper shot a patrolling British soldier (David Smith, aged 26) on Whiterock Road, Ballymurphy, Belfast. He died on 4 July.
- 2 July 1974: A patrolling British soldier (John Walton, aged 27) was killed by an IRA booby-trap bomb in a derelict house at Carrickgallogly, near Belleek, County Armagh.
- 12 July 1974: The IRA shot dead a UDA member (John Beattie, aged 17) while he was standing on the corner of Glenrosa and Moyola streets, Tiger's Bay, Belfast.
- 17 July 1974: The IRA bombed the White Tower, Tower of London; one English civilian (Dorothy Household, aged 48) was killed.
- 20 July 1974: A former British soldier (Brian Shaw, aged 21) was found shot dead in a derelict house on Arundel Street, off Grosvenor Road, Belfast.
- 23 July 1974: A British Airways Belfast-London flight, carrying 85 passengers including James Flanagan, RUC Chief Constable, made an emergency landing at Manchester after the pilot was told of a bomb warning. The IRA claimed it planted an un-primed bomb aboard the jet to prove it could breach airport security. It warned that in the future bombs would be set to explode.
- 23 July 1974: A UDR soldier (John Conley, aged 43) was killed when a car bomb exploded while he was helping to evacuating civilians from the area at Bridge Street, Garvagh, County Londonderry. Inadequate warning was given.
- 30 July 1974: The IRA devastated the commercial centre of Bangor, County Down, in an overnight firebomb attack.
- 30 July 1974: An IRA sniper shot dead a patrolling British soldier (Bernard Fearns, aged 34) on Hillman Street, New Lodge, Belfast.
- 3 August 1974: A Protestant civilian (Charles McKnight, aged 25) was killed by a booby trap bomb when he entered the cab of his employer's lorry, parked outside house at Ballycraigy, Newtownabbey, County Antrim. CAIN cites IRA as responsible. Reason unknown.
- 13 August 1974: Two Royal Marines, Dennis Leach (aged 24) and Michael Southern (aged 19), were killed when the IRA detonated a remote-controlled bomb in their observation post at Drummuckavall, near Crossmaglen, County Armagh.
- 23 August 1974: The IRA shot dead an undercover RUC officer (Peter Flanagan, aged 47) inside the Diamond Bar on George Street, Omagh, County Tyrone.
- 23 August 1974: The IRA shot dead a former UDR soldier (William Hutchinson, aged 29), while engaged in a traffic census at Cabragh, near Dungannon, County Tyrone.
- 26 August 1974: A patrolling British soldier (Philip Drake, aged 20) was killed by an IRA sniper in Drumbeg, Craigavon, County Armagh.
- 27 August 1974: An IRA volunteer (Patrick McKeown, aged 29) died when his bomb prematurely exploded in a house in Barcroft Park, Newry.
- 7 September 1974: A civilian (Mary Bingham, aged 58) was shot dead during an IRA sniper attack on a British foot patrol in Dungannon, County Tyrone.
- 8 September 1974: A Catholic man (Arthur Rafferty, aged 56) died three weeks after being shot on Newington Street, Belfast, by the IRA. A piece of cardboard was found nearby that had written on it: "this is the penalty for a sexual assault on a child of seven years old at the Waterworks". After the shooting a caller rang the Irish News and said it had been a "punishment shooting" carried out by the IRA. Rafferty's family dispute this and a later investigation by the police ombudsman found no evidence that Mr Rafferty was suspected by the police of an offence of this nature.
- 16 September 1974: The IRA shot dead Martin McBirney, a resident magistrate (aged 55), at his home on Belmont Road, East Belfast. His sister-in-law, Frances Cooke, suffered a fatal heart attack upon hearing the news.
- 16 September 1974: The IRA shot dead Rory Conaghan (aged 54), a judge, at his home, Beechlands, off Malone Road, Belfast.
- 22 September 1974: The IRA shot dead a former prison officer (William McCully, aged 58) at his home, Hillmount Gardens, Finaghy, Belfast.
- 29 September 1974: Twenty-three mortar bombs were launched by the IRA at a British Army facility in Crossmaglen. The facility was also hit by automatic fire. The attack was to be combined with an air strike using a hijacked Cessna plane that was eventually called off.
- 29 September 1974: An aerial bombing was attempted on the British Army base at Crossmaglen by two IRA members who hijacked a three-seat Cessna plane from a flying club at Dundalk, while another two IRA men remained on the ground to prevent club members from raising the alarm. The IRA unit loaded the aircraft with four cylinder bombs and forced the pilot to fly over the border. The attack failed after the hijackers became lost, and one of them launched a bomb five miles away from the intended target before flying back to the Republic. The dropping of the bomb was witnessed by British soldiers manning a border outpost. The Cessna eventually made a safe landing in a field near Ravensdale, County Louth. The strike was intended to support the mortar attack on the same compound.
- 5 October 1974: A female civilian (Asha Chopra, aged 25) was killed during an IRA sniper attack on an RUC patrol at Greenhaw Road, Shantallow, Derry.
- 5 October 1974: Guildford pub bombing – four British soldiers and a civilian were killed and 182 were hurt when the IRA bombed a pub frequented by off-duty soldiers. Four people, dubbed the "Guildford Four", would be convicted for the bombing and imprisoned for life. Fifteen years later Lord Lane of the Court of Appeal would overturn their convictions noting "the investigating officers must have lied". Some of the Four had spent the entire 15 years in prison.
- 8 October 1974: An RUC officer (Arthur Henderson, aged 31) was killed by an IRA booby-trap bomb in an abandoned car on West Street, Stewartstown, County Tyrone.
- 21 October 1974: The IRA kidnapped and shot dead an off-duty British Territorial Army soldier (Malcolm Gibson, aged 28) in Belfast. He was found shot dead in a derelict house, shortly after being abducted while driving a laundry van at Velsheda Park, Ardoyne, Belfast.
- 23 October 1974: A British soldier (Michael Simpson, aged 21) died three weeks after being shot by an IRA sniper while on foot patrol on Racecourse Road, Shantallow, Derry.
- 28 October 1974: The IRA detonated a van bomb outside the British Army base at Ballykinlar, County Down, killing two British soldiers, Alan Coughlan (aged 22) and Michael Swanick (aged 20).
- 30 October 1974: An IRA volunteer (Michael Meenan, aged 16) died when his bomb prematurely exploded at a garage on Strand Road, Derry.
- 30 October 1974: a civilian (Gordon Catherwood, aged 44), shot dead by an IRA sniper aiming at the victim's son, a UDR soldier, Upper Hightown Road, near Belfast.
- 6 November 1974: An IRA sniper shot dead two patrolling British soldiers, Brian Allen (aged 20) and Stephen Windsor (aged 26), while on foot patrol in Crossmaglen, County Armagh.
- 6 November 1974: An IRA volunteer, Hugh Coney (aged 24), was shot dead by the British Army during an escape attempt from Long Kesh Prison in County Down.
- 7 November 1974: Two British soldiers, Vernon Rose (aged 30) and Charles Simpson (aged 35) were killed by an IRA booby trap bomb at an electricity sub station at Aghalarg, near Stewartstown, County Tyrone.
- 7 November 1974: An off-duty British soldier (Richard Dunne, aged 42) and a civilian (Alan Horsley, aged 20), were killed when a bomb was thrown through the window of the Kings Arms, Woolwich, England. Twenty-eight other people were injured.
- 8 November 1974: An IRA volunteer (Gerard Fennell, aged 28), was shot dead by a British Army sniper from a concealed observation post during the attempted hijacking of a van, Stewartstown Road, Twinbrook, Belfast.
- 12 November 1974: Two civilians, Leonard Cross (aged 19) and Hugh Slater (aged 29), who worked for the British Army were found shot dead by the side of Sheriffs Road near Derry.
- 14 November 1974: An IRA volunteer, James McDade (aged 28), died after the bomb he was planting outside a telephone exchange in Coventry, England exploded prematurely.
- 15 November 1974: A patrolling British soldier (Anthony Simmons, aged 19), was shot dead by an IRA sniper while on foot patrol on Fountain Street, Strabane, County Tyrone.
- 16 November 1974: A UDR soldier (Thomas McCready, aged 32) on mobile patrol was killed by an IRA sniper in Newry, County Down.
- 20 November 1974: An RUC officer (Robert Forde, aged 29) was killed by an IRA booby trap bomb hidden under a pathway at Rathmore, Craigavon, County Armagh.
- 21 November 1974: The Birmingham pub bombings kill 19 people. The "Birmingham Six" would be tried for this and convicted. Many years later, their convictions would be quashed and they would be released. The IRA has never claimed or accepted responsibility.
- 2 December 1974: A British soldier (John Maddocks, aged 32), was killed while on foot patrol by an IRA booby trap bomb hidden in a milk churn in a field at Gortmullan, near Derrylin, County Fermanagh.
- 2 December 1974: An IRA volunteer, Ethel Lynch (aged 22), was wounded when her bomb prematurely exploded in a house on Crawford Square, Derry. She died on 7 December.
- 7 December 1974: An IRA volunteer, John McDaid (aged 16), died when his bomb prematurely exploded in a house on Bridge Street, Derry.
- 14 December 1974: IRA snipers shot a British Army soldier (Michael Gibson, aged 20) and an RUC officer (David McNeice, aged 19) while on joint foot patrol at Killeavy, near Forkill, County Armagh. Gibson died from his injuries on 30 December 1974.
- 17 December 1974: An IRA bomb exploded at Tottenham Court Road, London, killing a passer-by, George Arthur (35).
- 21 December 1974: A bomb was defused in Harrods department store in Knightsbridge, London. A second bomb was defused in the King's Arms public house in Warminster, Wiltshire.
- 22 December 1974: The IRA leadership declared a temporary ceasefire, pending talks with British government officials. Shortly before the ceasefire came into effect, the IRA bombed the London home of the Conservative Party leader and former Prime Minister Edward Heath. He was not home and no one was injured.

== 1975 ==
- 10 January 1975: the British Army shot dead an IRA volunteer, John Francis Green (aged 27), in a shed on a farm in Tullynageer, near Castleblaney, County Monaghan.
- 19 January 1975: The IRA's Balcombe Street Gang shot up two hotels, the Carlton Tower Hotel and Portman Hotel, in London. Twelve people were injured. (See Carlton Tower and Portman Hotel shootings).
- 20 January 1975: IRA volunteer Kevin Coen was shot dead by the British Army, at Cassidy's Cross near Kinawley, County Fermanagh.
- 21 January 1975: two IRA volunteers, John Kelly (aged 26) and John Stone (aged 23), driving along Victoria Street, Belfast, were killed when the bomb they were transporting exploded prematurely. A series of bomb attacks across Belfast later ensued.
- 24 January 1975: a British soldier (Thomas Lea, aged 32) died eight months after being injured in an IRA bomb attack, Colinward Street, off Springfield Road, Belfast. He was wounded on 5 May 1974.
- 26 January 1975: the IRA planted a boobytrap bomb inside an Air Training Corps hut. The unprotected wooden hut was located within the grounds of Cavehill primary school. The bomb was triggered when 16yr old Edward Wilson opened an internal door, killing him instantly and injuring 5 other cadets aged between 13 and 15 years old.
- 27 January 1975: the IRA exploded a time bomb at Lewis's department store in Manchester, England. Following a warning telephoned to the Press Association at 16:07 pm, the bomb exploded 17 minutes later injuring 19 people, one of them seriously. Seven bombs were also planted in London, five of them exploded injuring six people.
- 31 January 1975: an RUC officer (George Coulter, aged 43) was shot dead by an IRA sniper while on mobile patrol on Donaghmore Road, Dungannon, County Tyrone.
- 8 February 1975: a British soldier (William Robson, aged 22) died two days after being shot by an IRA sniper while on foot-patrol in the village of Mullan, County Fermanagh.
- 10 February 1975: the IRA leadership declare a truce. The ceasefire was to last officially until 23 January 1976, however it was not respected by all IRA units and violence continued throughout the year.
- 11 February 1975: a postman on relief duty (Christopher Mein, aged 25) was killed on his milk round by the IRA in Galbally, Cappagh, County Tyrone. The regular milkman was apparently the intended target.
- 27 February 1975: an off-duty police officer Stephen Tibble was shot dead as he joined in the chase of a suspect on his motorbike in Barons Court, London; the suspect had been spotted by a detective coming out of a house discovered to be an IRA bomb factory.
- 17 March 1975: an IRA volunteer (Thomas Smith, aged 28), a native of Dublin, was shot dead by the Irish Army while attempting to escape from Portlaoise Prison in County Laois.
- 24 March 1975: a post office official (William Elliott, aged 51) was shot dead when he arrived at the scene of a robbery at the post office in Silverbridge, County Armagh. It is alleged that the IRA was responsible and that the gunmen thought Elliott was an RUC officer.
- 25 April 1975: a UDA member (Samuel Johnston, aged 33) was shot dead as he walked at the junction of Bachelors Walk and Carrickblacker Road in Portadown, County Armagh. Gunmen, thought to be IRA volunteers, pulled-up alongside him in a car and opened fire. Although the Sutton Database lists him as a civilian, Lost Lives lists him as a "high-ranking local UDA member".
- 2 May 1975: a UDA member (Alexander Millar, aged 55) was shot dead by the IRA at his workplace, Ardoyne Bus Depot, Ardoyne Road, Belfast.
- 10 May 1975: an RUC officer (Paul Gray, aged 20) was shot dead by an IRA sniper while on foot-patrol, Waterloo Street, Derry.
- 18 May 1975: an IRA volunteer (Francis Rice, aged 17) was stabbed to death by the UVF in a lane off Rathfriland Road, Castlewellan, County Down.
- 31 May 1975: the IRA kidnapped and shot dead one of their own members (Eamon Molloy, aged 22) from Belfast whom they alleged was an informer. His remains were located and returned to his family by the IRA on 28 May 1999.
- 1 June 1975: Margaret Kilfedder (aged 61), a Protestant civilian, was killed in a bomb attack on her home in Garrison, County Fermanagh. The house was previously owned by a Ulster Defence Regiment (UDR) soldier.
- 3 June 1975: the IRA shot a UDR soldier (Alfred Doyle, aged 24) and two civilians, David Thompson (aged 34) and John Presha (aged 30), dead in Thompson's car in Killeen, County Armagh.
- 4 June 1975: an IRA volunteer (Francis Jordan, aged 21) was shot dead while planting a bomb outside the British Army barracks at Pit Bar, Mill Vale, near Bessbrook, County Armagh.
- 10 June 1975: a UVF member (Roy Suitters, aged 39) was shot dead by the IRA at his greengrocer's shop, Crumlin Road, near Ligoniel Road, Belfast.
- 22 June 1975: Thomas Irvine (aged 23), a Protestant civilian was shot dead by the IRA from a passing car while he was standing at Westland Road, Belfast.
- 7 July 1975: an RUC officer (Andrew Johnston, aged 26), was killed by an IRA booby trap bomb, attached to a desk at Carrick Primary School on Sloan Street, Lurgan, County Armagh.
- 12 July 1975: a purported UDA member (James Carberry, aged 20) was found shot dead on Old Templepatrick Road, Ballyutoag, County Antrim. He was a doorman at a UDA club. It is believed the IRA was responsible. Although the Sutton Database lists him as a civilian, Lost Lives lists him as UDA member.
- 17 July 1975: the IRA killed four British soldiers (Calvert Brown, Edward Garside, Robert McCarter, and Peter Willis) in a remote controlled bomb attack near Forkill, County Armagh.
- 2 August 1975: the IRA shot dead a former UDR soldier (George McCall, aged 22), while he was walking near his home in Moy, County Tyrone.
- 10 August 1975: After riots broke out during an anti-internment march a gun battle broke out which lasted for two hours between IRA snipers & British soldiers around Divis Flats. Two civilians were killed in the crossfire Siobhan McCabe (4) & Patrick Crawford (15), and eight people were wounded during the battle.
- 13 August 1975: four Protestant civilians and a member of the UVF were killed in a gun and bomb attack on the Bayardo Bar in Belfast.
- 13 August 1975: the IRA kidnapped and shot dead a former RUC officer in County Armagh; his body was found near Newtownhamilton on 15 August 1975.
- 15 August 1975: the IRA shot dead a Protestant civilian (Norman Kerr, aged 28), a disc jockey packing up his equipment at the Camrick Bar, Market Street, Armagh town. The IRA claimed they killed Kerr due to his alleged association with Captain Robert Nairac and claimed it was in possession of his diary, which had been stolen in Portadown.
- 27 August 1975: a bomb exploded without warning at the Caterham Arms public house in Caterham, Surrey, England; ten off-duty British soldiers and 23 civilians were injured.
- 28 August 1975: seven people were injured when a bomb exploded in Oxford Street, London; a telephone warning was issued to The Sun newspaper five minutes before the explosion.
- 29 August 1975: a British Army bomb-disposal expert (Roger Goad, aged 40) attached to the police was killed attempting to defuse an IRA bomb which had been left in a shoe shop on Church Street, Kensington, London.
- 30 August 1975: the IRA shot dead an off-duty UDR soldier (Robert Frazer, aged 50) while he was driving away from a friend's farm at Ballymoyer, near Whitecross, County Armagh.
- 31 August 1975: the IRA shot dead an off-duty UDR soldier (Joseph Reid, aged 46) at his farm at Farnaloy, near Keady, County Armagh.
- 1 September 1975: five Protestant civilians were killed and seven wounded when IRA members attacked an Orange Order meeting hall at Tullyvallen, near Newtownhamilton in County Armagh. An off-duty RUC officer returned fire with a pistol. Before leaving, the attackers also planted a 2-pound bomb outside the hall, but it failed to detonate. The "South Armagh Republican Action Force" claimed responsibility, saying it was retaliation for a string of attacks on Catholic civilians by Loyalists.
- 5 September 1975: two people (Robert Lloyd and Grace Loohuis) were killed and 63 injured when an IRA bomb exploded in the lobby of the Hilton hotel in London.
- 8 September 1975: a UDA member (Andrew Craig, aged 20) was shot dead by the IRA at the corner of Alfred and Russell streets, Markets, South Belfast.
- 6 October 1975: an RUC officer (David Love, aged 45), was killed in an IRA bomb attack at the Roeview Inn, near Limavady, County Londonderry.
- 6 October 1975: a civilian (Alice McGuinness, aged 57) was killed three days after sustaining critical injuries in an IRA bomb attack on John McKeague's hardware shop on the Albertbridge Road, Belfast. John McKeague's sister was severely injured in the same bombing.
- 9 October 1975: a British soldier on patrol (Edward Gleeson, aged 28) was killed in an IRA landmine attack at Lurgancullenboy, near Crossmaglen, County Armagh.
- 9 October 1975: a civilian (Graham Tuck, aged 23) was killed when an IRA bomb exploded outside Green Park tube station, London, England.
- 10 October 1975: a UDA member (Ernest Dowds, aged 21) was shot dead by the IRA while walking near his home, Haywood Avenue, off Ormeau Road, Belfast.
- 14 October 1975: an RUC officer was killed in an IRA booby-trap bomb attack in Portadown, County Armagh.
- 23 October 1975: a civilian (Gordon Hamilton-Fairley, aged 45) was killed when a bomb attached to the car of Conservative MP Hugh Fraser exploded prematurely, Campden Hill Square, Kensington, London.
- 29 October 1975: the Provisional IRA shot dead an Official IRA volunteer (Robert Elliman, aged 27), in McKenna's Bar, Stanfield Street, Markets, South Belfast. Between 29 October 1975 and 12 November 1975, 11 people would die in the continuing feud between the two wings of the IRA. Most of those killed were members of the Official IRA.
- 30 October 1975: Eileen Kelly (aged 6) was shot dead by the IRA at her home, Beechmount Grove, Falls, Belfast. Her Official IRA volunteer father was the intended target during the Official IRA/Provisional IRA feud.
- 31 October 1975: the IRA abducted and killed Columba McVeigh (17) as a suspected informer; his body has never been recovered.
- 31 October 1975: the Provisional IRA shot dead an Official IRA volunteer (Thomas Berry, aged 27) outside Sean Martin's Gaelic Athletic Association Club, Beechfield Street, Short Strand, Belfast.
- 31 October 1975: a Provisional IRA volunteer (Seamus McCusker, aged 40), was shot dead by the Official IRA in New Lodge, Belfast.
- 3 November 1975: the IRA shot dead a Republican Clubs member (James Fogarty, aged 22) at his home, Rock Grove, Ballymurphy, Belfast.
- 6 November 1975: a UDR soldier (John Bell, aged 59) was shot dead by the IRA, while driving home from work at Ballymoyer, near Newtownhamilton, County Armagh.
- 9 November 1975: the IRA shot an OIRA volunteer (John Kelly, aged 19) dead as he walked along Ponsonby Avenue, New Lodge, Belfast. OIRA/(P)IRA feud.
- 10 November 1975: a UDR soldier (Joseph Nesbitt, aged 53) was shot dead by an IRA sniper outside Gough British Army Base at Carramoyle, near Keady, County Armagh.
- 11 November 1975: the Provisional IRA shot dead an Official IRA volunteer, a Republican Clubs member, and his relative in separate attacks in Belfast as part of the ongoing Provisional IRA/Official IRA feud.
- 12 November 1975: a civilian (John Batey) was killed when an IRA unit threw a bomb into Scott's Restaurant, Mount Street, Mayfair, London.
- 16 November 1975: an RUC officer (Joseph Clements, aged 48) on mobile patrol, was killed in a land mine attack near Sixmilecross, County Tyrone.
- 18 November 1975: two civilians, Audrey Edgson (aged 45) and Theodore Williams (aged 49) were killed when an IRA unit threw a bomb into Walton's Restaurant on Walton Street, London.
- 21 November 1975: a British soldier (Simon Francis, aged 29) was killed by an IRA booby-trap bomb hidden in an abandoned rifle close to a crashed car at Carrive, near Forkill, County Armagh.
- 22 November 1975: three British soldiers (James Duncan (19), Peter McDonald (19), and Michael Sampson (20)) were killed in a gun battle when an IRA unit attacked their undercover observation post at Drummuckavall, County Armagh (see Drummuckavall ambush).
- 25 November 1975: two RUC officers, Samuel Clarke (aged 35) and Patrick Maxwell (aged 36), were killed when their mobile patrol was caught in an IRA sniper ambush in Clonavaddy, near Ballygawley, County Tyrone. In a separate incident a UDR soldier, Robert Stott (aged 22), was shot dead by the IRA outside his home in The Fountain area of Derry.
- 27 November 1975: the IRA killed businessman and TV personality Ross McWhirter (aged 50) at his home, Village Road, Enfield, London; he had offered reward money to anyone who would inform on the IRA.
- 1 December 1975: two IRA volunteers, Laura Crawford (aged 25) and Paul Fox (aged 20), died when killed when the bomb they were transporting exploded prematurely at a car park, King Street, Belfast.
- 6 December 1975: two IRA volunteers, Sean Campbell (aged 20) and James Lochrie (aged 19), died when the landmine they were setting exploded prematurely at Kelly's Road, Killeen, County Armagh.
- 6–12 December 1975: four IRA volunteers held two people hostage in the Balcombe Street Siege.
- 18 December 1975: the IRA killed two British soldiers, Cyril McDonald (aged 43) and Colin McInnes (aged 20), in a bomb attack, Bank Place, near Guildhall Square, Derry. It was later established that the soldiers had been lured out of their sangar by children who offered them sweets. While the soldiers were distracted IRA volunteers lowered a bomb onto the roof of their sangar which exploded a few minutes later.

== 1976 ==
- 5 January 1976: The Kingsmill massacre: Gunmen stopped a minibus carrying eleven Protestant workmen, lined them up alongside it and shot them. Only one victim survived, despite having been shot 18 times. A Catholic man on the minibus was allowed to go free. A group calling itself the South Armagh Republican Action Force, a cover for IRA members, claimed responsibility. Although the Kingsmill massacre was in "direct response" to the killing of six Catholics the night before, the attack was planned before that.
- 5 January 1976: A RUC officer on mobile patrol (Clifford Evans, aged 30) was shot dead by an IRA sniper near Castledawson, County Londonderry.
- 13 January 1976: Two IRA volunteers (Rosemary Bleakley, aged 18, and Martin McDonagh, aged 23), along with two apparently uninvolved Catholic civilians (Mary Dornan, aged 36, and Ian Gallagher, aged 41) were killed when the bomb they were transporting exploded prematurely in North Street, Belfast.
- 17 January 1976: A British soldier Mark Ashford (aged 19) was shot dead in an IRA gun attack on a British checkpoint in Derry City.
- 17 January 1976: A Catholic civilian, Seamus O'Brien (aged 25), was found shot dead by the IRA at junction of Glen Road and Glenside Road, Andersonstown, Belfast; the IRA claimed he was an informer.
- 22 January 1976: An off-duty UDR soldier, John Arrell (aged 32), was shot dead while driving his firm's minibus home from work, by an IRA sniper in Claudy, County Londonderry.
- 22 January 1976: A Catholic civilian, Kieran McCann (aged 20), was shot dead at his workplace in Eglish, near Dungannon, County Tyrone, by the IRA as an alleged informer.
- 30 January 1976: A civilian, John Smiley (aged 55), was killed in an IRA bomb attack on the Klondyke Bar, a pub reportedly frequented by paramilitaries in the loyalist Sandy Row area of Belfast.
- 6 February 1976: Two RUC officers, James Blakely (aged 42) and William Murtagh (aged 31), were fatally wounded in an IRA gun attack while on foot patrol in the Cliftonville area of Belfast. Murtagh died the following day.
- 7 February 1976: Two Protestant teenagers, Rachel and Robert McLernon (aged 18 and 16, respectively), were killed by an IRA booby-trap bomb, intended for members of the security forces, which had been hidden in an abandoned crashed car at Tyresson Road, Cookstown, County Tyrone.
- 12 February 1976: An IRA volunteer Frank Stagg (34) died on his 62nd day of a hunger strike in Wakefield Prison in England.
- 12 February 1976: A RUC officer William Hamer (aged 31) was shot dead while on foot patrol in Claudy, County Londonderry.
- 12 February 1976: James O'Neill (aged 17), Irish Republican Army Youth Section, died after being badly burnt during an arson attack on a furniture warehouse, Antrim Road, New Lodge, Belfast.
- 13 February 1976: An IRA volunteer (Sean Bailey, aged 20) died one day after being injured in a premature bomb explosion in house, Nansen Street, Falls, Belfast.
- 15 February 1976: An IRA volunteer was shot dead by the British Army while escaping from a gun attack on the Ballygomartin Road in Belfast.
- 22 February 1976: A Protestant civilian, Marjorie Lockington (aged 55), was shot dead by IRA volunteers during a hijacking of her car near Killeen, County Armagh.
- 26 February 1976: An off-duty UDR soldier, Joseph McCullough (aged 57), was stabbed to death by an IRA unit while arriving to his farm at Tullyvallen, near Newtownhamilton, County Armagh.
- 27 February 1976: A UVF member was shot dead by the IRA in a drive-by shooting in the Donegall Pass area of Belfast.
- 27 February 1976: Harold Blair (aged 51), a Protestant employee of the Northern Ireland Electricity Company was wounded when he triggered an IRA booby-trap bomb in a derelict house on Landseer Street, Belfast. An electricity meter-reader, Blair accidentally triggered the anti-handling device on a bomb hidden in the meter box. It is believed a British foot-patrol was the intended target. Blair died the following day, 28 February.
- 4 March 1976: A bomb exploded in an empty train near Cannon Street station in London, England. Eight people in a passing train were injured.
- 7 March 1976: The IRA launched six mortar rounds into Belfast International Airport, injuring an RUC member and damaging cars in a parking area and the arrival lounge door. There were no casualties.
- 10 March 1976: Former UDA spokesman Sammy Smyth was shot dead by the IRA on Alliance Avenue in Belfast.
- 13 March 1976: A former British soldier was shot dead on Alliance Avenue in Belfast.
- 18 March 1976: The IRA attacked a British base in the Creggan, Derry City, with nine mortars and sniper fire.
- 27 March 1976: A bomb at London's Olympia Hall injures at least 80 people. One woman, Rachel Hyams (aged 79), later dies of her injuries. The IRA reportedly take responsibility.
- 30 March 1976: A British soldier (Donald Traynor, aged 28) was killed by an IRA booby trap bomb at the Orange Hall in Ballygargan, near Portadown, County Armagh.
- 31 March 1976: Three British soldiers (Roderick Bannon, aged 25; David Ferguson, aged 20; John Pearson, aged 23) were killed in a land mine attack on a British Army mobile patrol at Carrickgallogly Bridge, near Belleek, County Armagh.
- 1 April 1976: An UDR soldier was killed in an IRA gun attack in Castledawson, County Londonderry.
- 2 April 1976: An UDR soldier was shot dead by the IRA in Maghera, County Londonderry.
- 5 April 1976: A UDR soldier was shot dead by the IRA at his home near Newtownhamilton, County Armagh.
- 5 April 1976: An IRA volunteer was shot dead by the RUC shortly after carrying out a bomb attack on the Conway Hotel in Dunmurry, County Antrim.
- 6 April 1976: A UDR soldier was shot dead in an IRA sniper attack on a British mobile-patrol near Middletown, County Armagh.
- 7 April 1976: Three civilians were killed when IRA firebombs exploded in their Drapery shop at The Square in Dromore, County Down. They lived above the shop, whose owner was reportedly a loyalist.
- 15 April 1976: An IRA volunteer was shot dead by the British Army shortly after being apprehended near Forkill, County Armagh.
- 15 April 1976: An RAF Wessex helicopter carrying on British paratroopers was shot down after being hit by machine gun fire and an anti-tank rocket while approaching Crossmaglen security base. The pilot managed to crash-land the machine on a nearby football pitch, and wheeled it to the base. The Wessex was severely damaged, but no major injuries were reported.
- 16 April 1976: Two civilians were killed when a bomb exploded inside their workplace on Servia Street, Belfast. Although no group claimed responsibility it was reported that the blast was likely caused by "an IRA bomb stored on the premises".
- 19 April 1976: A Prison Officer was shot dead by the IRA in Dunmurry, County Antrim.
- 22 April 1976: A RUC Officer was shot dead by an IRA sniper while on patrol in Coalisland, County Tyrone.
- 29 April 1976: A UDR soldier and a civilian were killed in an IRA gun-attack in Dunamony, County Tyrone.
- 15 May 1976: Three RUC officers were killed in an IRA landmine attack on their patrol in Belcoo, Fermanagh. Another RUC officer was killed in a sniper attack in Warrenpoint, County Down.
- 16 May 1976: The IRA shot dead an RUC officer outside his home in Derryfubble, County Tyrone. Two civilians were shot dead as they stood outside a social club on Alliance Road, Belfast.
- 17 May 1976: An IRA volunteer was killed when British soldiers opened fire on a bus in the Strand Road, Derry.
- 21 May 1976: A civilian was killed when a bomb exploded on a train near Moira, County Down. A warning was given but the bomb detonated before the area could be evacuated.
- 22 May 1976: An RUC officer was shot dead in an IRA gun attack in Dungannon, County Tyrone.
- 2 June 1976: Two RUC officers were shot dead in separate IRA attacks in Derry and Belfast.
- 2 June 1976: A UDA member was shot dead at his home on the Shankill Road in Belfast by an IRA unit.
- 11 June 1976: Four British bases in Belfast were attacked with mortars and gunfire within minutes of each other. Several British soldiers were hurt and an IRA volunteer was shot.
- 19 June 1976: A UDA member was shot dead at his home in Dunmurry, County Antrim.
- 28 June 1976: A British soldier was killed when the landing zone of his helicopter-borne patrol was the subject of an IRA landmine attack near Crossmaglen, County Armagh.
- 30 June 1976: A British soldier was shot dead in an IRA gun-attack on the Springfield Road in Belfast.
- 30 June 1976: An IRA volunteer was killed during an attack on a British patrol when a grenade he was handling exploded prematurely.
- 1 July 1976: A Catholic civilian was shot dead by the IRA in the Finaghy area of Belfast. The IRA claimed he was an informer.
- 3 July 1976: A British soldier was shot dead by an IRA sniper while manning a checkpoint on Butcher Street in Derry.
- 6 July 1976: A Catholic civilian was shot dead by the IRA in Hannahstown, Belfast; the IRA claimed he was an informer.
- 7 July 1976: Two senior RUC officers were seriously injured after an IRA double agent led them to an arms dump outside Portadown. When the officers picked up one of the weapons it triggered a booby trap which detonated. One of the officers lost an arm, a leg and an eye in the explosion.
- 17 July 1976: Two IRA volunteers died when the bomb they were transporting exploded accidentally near Castlederg, County Tyrone.
- 18 July 1976: A civilian was killed by a booby-trap bomb planted in the laneway of his home at Drumgole, County Fermanagh. It is believed the bomb was planted by the IRA and was meant for two close relatives who were RUC reserve officers.
- 21 July 1976: An IRA landmine killed Christopher Ewart-Biggs, the newly appointed British ambassador to the Republic of Ireland, and his secretary, Judith Cook. Two others in the car, including the driver were seriously injured. A British soldier was also killed in a bomb attack in Derry City the same day.
- 30 July 1976: A UDR soldier was shot dead by the IRA in Moneymore, County Londonderry.
- 31 July 1976: An RUC officer was shot dead by an IRA sniper on Church Street in Lurgan.
- 8 August 1976: A British soldier was killed by an IRA bomb hidden in a booby-trapped bicycle in Crossmaglen.
- 10 August 1976: An IRA volunteer, Daniel Lennon, was killed when he was shot while escaping from a British Army patrol. After being shot his car went out of control, crashing and killing three Catholic children, whose mother later committed suicide and whose aunt was Mairead Corrigan Maguire.
- 11 August 1976: A civilian was killed during an IRA gun attack on a British observation post at Meenan Square, Derry.
- 19 August 1976: There was a gun attack on the home of the Grand Master of the Orange Order at West Circular Crescent, Belfast. His son was shot and died of his wounds on 26 August 1976. The attack was blamed on the IRA. The Grand Master, a frequent critic of the IRA, was thought to have been the target.
- 26 August 1976: A RUC officer was shot dead by an IRA unit in Andersonstown, Belfast.
- 1 September 1976: A British Army post in Crossmaglen was hit by 10 mortars. It caused extensive damage and some soldiers were hurt.
- 18 September 1976: A RUC officer was shot dead by an IRA unit while directing traffic in Portadown.
- 1 October 1976: A Protestant man died one month after being shot at his relative's house on Copperfield Street, Belfast. The Sutton Database claims he was a civilian who was shot by the IRA. However, Lost Lives claims he was a former British soldier. It also notes that a man was imprisoned for his murder but there was no charge of IRA membership.
- 8 October 1976: A RUC officer and a Prison Officer were killed in separate IRA gun attacks in Derry.
- 9 October 1976: A civilian was killed when IRA firebombs exploded in a shop on Bridge Street, Ballymena.
- 13 October 1976: IRA volunteers shot dead a UVF member outside his home in Annaghmore, County Armagh by opening fire on his car as he arrived home. Although the Sutton Database lists him as a civilian, Lost Lives lists him as a UVF member and notes that he had received a two-year suspended sentence for handling ammunition which he was said to have bought from a UDR soldier. His son was wounded in the attack and died on 25 October 1976.
- 16 October 1976: Garda Michael Clerkin was killed in the Garryhinch ambush near Mountmellick, County Laois, when a surprise booby-trap bomb exploded while he was investigating an anonymous tip about a bomb plot to assassinate Oliver J. Flanagan. Four other gardaí present were injured.
- 16 October 1976: Three IRA volunteers died when a bomb they were transporting exploded accidentally at Belfast Gas Works.
- 24 October 1976: Two British soldiers were killed when an IRA sniper team ambushed a British patrol in Ardoyne, Belfast.
- 26 October 1976: A UDR soldier was shot dead at his workplace on Eglish Street, Armagh town.
- 28 October 1976: A UDR soldier was killed in an IRA gun-attack in Pomeroy, County Tyrone.
- 2 November 1976: 26-year-old RUC detective DC Noel McCabe shot dead by the IRA on the Falls Road, Belfast. He was later posthumously awarded the Queen's Gallantry Medal.
- 2 November 1976: A RUC officer shot by the IRA at Fintona, County Tyrone as he alighted his patrol car in the town's main street; he survived the attack.
- 2 November 1976: A RUC reservist was seriously injured when a booby-trapped device planted by the IRA exploded in his lorry at Grange Park, Balleygawley.
- 3 November 1976: A Protestant businessman and former B-Special, Samuel McConnell (aged 59), was shot dead by the IRA at his home in Dunrod, County Antrim.
- 3 November 1976: a Protestant civilian, Georgina Strain (aged 50), was shot dead by the IRA at her home on Hogarth Street in the Tiger Bay area of North Belfast; the reason is unknown.
- 6 November 1976: A former RUC sergeant now working for the force as an office manager lost both legs when the IRA left a booby-trapped device attached to the garage door of his house in Newry, County Down.
- 7 November 1976: 40 people injured by a 500lbs bomb planted by the IRA in a stolen car. Exploded outside the Raglan Bar on Queen Street, Ballymena, County Antrim.
- 7 November 1976: Two British soldiers seriously injured by an IRA landmine which caught two armoured vehicles at Donagh, County Fermanagh.
- 7 November 1976: 33-year-old UDR soldier Lance Corporal Winston McCaughey, a father of two, was shot dead by the IRA outside his home on Abercorn Road, Derry.
- 9 November 1976: A UDR soldier Lance Corporal Jimmy Spears (aged 46), a father of three, shot dead by two IRA gunmen as he worked off-duty at his garage in County Londonderry.
- 11 November 1976: A UDR soldier was shot dead by the IRA outside his home in Kilrea, County Londonderry.
- 11 November 1976: A former IRA quartermaster was shot dead inside a social club on Saul Street, Belfast. He allegedly gave information to the RUC under interrogation and was ordered to leave the district. It was reported he was shot for repeatedly returning to the district.
- 13 November 1976: A 35-year-old employee of the Ministry of Agriculture was forced by the IRA to drive a van packed with explosives into Magherafelt, County Londonderry, and to the Co-op on Union Street. Explosives partially neutralised by the British Army caused less damage than intended when the remainder exploded.
- 15 November 1976: During a rain storm in Lurgan, North Armagh, a four-man UDR foot patrol was ambushed in the town centre by IRA gunmen, one of whom was firing an American-supplied Armalite. Two soldiers were hit; one was a 19-year-old who later recovered in hospital, the other was 41-year-old Private George Lutton who died at the scene.
- 16 November 1976: A Catholic civilian, James Duffy (aged 48), was shot dead by a lone republican gunman on the Falls Road in an apparent case of mistaken identity. The man was shot in the back of the head as he chatted with a colleague while making a delivery to a butcher's shop.
- 18 November 1976: A UDR soldier was shot dead in an IRA attack in Altnagelvin, County Londonderry.
- 28 November 1976: The IRA accidentally killed two Catholic civilians in separate booby-trap bomb attacks on buildings being used as British Army observation posts. 16-year-old Philomena Green was killed as she passed a derelict house on Mary Street, Lurgan, County Armagh. She entered the house and switched on a light which triggered a bomb, killing her instantly. Shortly afterwards, 46-year-old father of ten Frank McConnellogue noticed a suspicious device in an alleyway (regularly used by on-patrol British soldiers) close to the Bluebell Bar on Lecky Road in the Bogside area of Derry. He rushed to warn two men who were stood nearby when the device exploded; the two men survived but McConnellogue was killed instantly. An IRA statement apologised for the killings, stating that when it was clear the bomb plan had failed they had contacted the British Army and a local priest. Soldiers and the priest then warned people to stay away.
- 30 November: Three masked IRA volunteers left a bomb in a grocery shop near Loughall and escaped in a stolen car. The Army EOD carried out a controlled explosion inside McArtarsey's Store and the resultant fire caused major damage to the premises.
- 30 November: An army foot patrol on High Street in Newry came under sustained attack from IRA gunmen hidden in the grounds of St Clare's school; no soldiers were injured.
- 30 November: IRA volunteers started a fire as a 'come on' on Derry Lane, Dungiven. The RUC and fire brigade attended and came under fire from gunmen secreted in nearby fields. One RUC officer was hit in the neck and badly injured.
- 1 December 1976: An IRA rocket hit a British APC in Belfast. No injuries reported.
- 3 December 1976: A RUC reservist Joseph Scott (aged 50), a father of five, was on his regular duty guiding children over a school crossing in the centre of Dungannon. A masked gunman shot him three times in the back before escaping in a nearby car. He died en route to hospital.
- 3 December: An army foot patrol around the Short Strand in Belfast came under major gunfire from automatic weapons being fired from nearby nationalist housing. The soldiers returned fire and one IRA gunman was observed to fall, escaping with the aid of supporters into nearby housing.
- 3 December: The IRA bombed the Spar Foodliner Supermarket in Belfast. Nearby houses on St Ives Gardens, Stranmillis Road suffered collateral damage.
- 4 December: The IRA's Andersonstown unit attempted to explode a car bomb at the loyalist Linfield Football Club at Windsor Park. The 60 lb. device was defused by EOD. The football club was targeted several times during the Troubles.
- 4 December: A no-warning bomb exploded a few feet away from an Army OP on Mountview Street in the Oldpark area of Belfast. Several soldiers were inside the OP when the 10 lb. bomb exploded and were unhurt.
- 4 December: EOD spent seven hours defusing a massive 200 lb. milk churn bomb left by the IRA. Over 300 homes were evacuated as the Army worked on two milk churns packed with high explosives, shrapnel and a primed mortar shell.
- 7 December: In Glengormley, North Belfast, three masked men driving a stolen car parked outside a prison officer's house. One of the assailants got out and shot at the off-duty officer but missed. The car was abandoned in Oldpark, Belfast.
- 7 December: IRA volunteers threw two hand grenades from a car at two RUCR officers who were on security barrier duty in Kildare Street, Belfast. They managed to kick the grenades away before they exploded, immediately after which shots were fired from another car but missed. The vehicles escaped into the nationalist Derrybeg estate.
- 11 December 1976: A British soldier was shot dead by an IRA sniper while on patrol in the Bogside, Derry.
- 15 December 1976: A RUC officer was shot dead by an IRA unit while manning a security barrier in Portadown.

== 1977 ==
- 1 January 1977: A British soldier was shot dead by an IRA sniper in Crossmaglen. The IRA also carried out a carbomb attack at Harmin Park, Newtownabbey. A civilian was killed after an inadequate warning was given.
- 9 January 1977. A British soldier was killed in an IRA booby trap bomb attack on his patrol near Newtownbutler, County Fermanagh.
- 11 January 1977: A British soldier was shot dead by an IRA sniper at a security barrier in the Oldpark area of Belfast.
- 14 January 1977: An RUC officer was killed in an IRA bomb attack in Inishrush, County Londonderry.
- 16 January 1977: An IRA volunteer was shot dead by undercover British soldiers near Crossmaglen, County Armagh.
- 19 January 1977: A number of IRA booby trap bombs targeted security force members.
- 27 January 1977: An RUC officer was shot dead by an IRA unit on the Strand Road in Derry.
- 29 January 1977: Seven IRA bombs explode in Londons West End. Warnings are given and there are no casualties.
- 2 February 1977: Jeffery Agate (59), then managing director of the American Du Pont factory in Derry was shot dead by IRA volunteers outside his home at Talbot Park, Derry. This killing marked the beginning of a series of attacks on businessmen. There were further killings on 2 March 1977 and 14 March 1977.
- 4 February 1977: An IRA bomb factory is discovered by police in Liverpool, England.
- 5 February 1977: An RUC officer was shot dead by an IRA sniper while on patrol in Gilford, County Down.
- 12 February 1977: An RUC officer was shot dead by an IRA unit in Cloughmills, County Antrim.
- 23 February 1977: A UDR soldier was shot dead by an IRA unit in the Waterside area of Derry City.
- 24 February 1977: An RUC officer was shot dead by an IRA unit while manning a security barrier in Lurgan, County Armagh.
- 26 February 1977: Robert Mitchell, a Justice of the Peace, was shot dead by the IRA in Newry.
- 27 February 1977: An ex-British soldier was shot dead by the IRA in the Ardoyne area of Belfast.
- 2 March 1977: Donald Robinson, an English businessman, was shot dead by the IRA in Belfast.
- 4 March 1977: Rory O'Kelly, Senior Department of Public Prosecutions official, was shot dead by the IRA in Coalisland, County Tyrone.
- 9 March 1977: A UDR soldier was shot dead by the IRA on his farm near Caledon, County Tyrone.
- 10 March 1977: A civilian was shot dead by the IRA during a bomb attack on a business on York Street, Belfast.
- 13 March 1977: An RUC officer was shot dead by an IRA sniper while on patrol in Lisnaskea, County Fermanagh.
- 14 March 1977: James Nicholson, an English businessman, was shot dead when his car was ambushed by an IRA unit in Belfast.
- 15 March 1977: A UDR soldier was shot dead by an IRA unit in Bellaghy, County Londonderry.
- 16 March 1977: An IRA sniper, hidden in the grounds of a church at Omeath, fired two shots at the British Navy patrol ship HMS Vigilant in Carlingford Lough. Royal Marines onboard returned fire. No hits were recorded by either side.
- 25 March 1977: A UDR soldier was shot dead by an IRA unit in Coalisland, County Tyrone.
- 28 March 1977: A civilian was shot dead by an IRA unit in Crosskeys, County Antrim. Her son, an RUC officer, was the intended target.
- 4 April 1977: A British soldier was killed in an IRA landmine attack on an Armoured Personnel Carrier near Belleek, County Fermanagh.
- 6 April 1977: A UDR soldier was shot dead while driving a vehicle in the Northland Road area of Derry.
- 8 April 1977: Two RUC officers were shot dead in an IRA ambush in Moneymore, County Londonderry.
- 9 April 1977: A civilian was shot dead by the IRA in Hannahstown, near Belfast. The IRA claimed he was a British informer.
- 10 April 1977: The relative of an OIRA volunteer was shot dead by the IRA in the Turf Lodge area of Belfast as part of an ongoing feud.
- 15 April 1977: A British soldier was shot dead by the IRA in the City Cemetery, Derry.
- 17 April 1977: An IRA volunteer was shot dead by a British Army sniper on Flax Street in the Ardoyne area of Belfast.
- 23 April 1977: An IRA volunteer was shot dead by the British Army while in a car park in the Stewardstown area of Belfast.
- 29 April 1977: A UDR soldier was shot dead by the IRA outside his home in Dungannon, County Tyrone.
- 3 May 1977: A civilian was found shot dead in a field off Glen Road, Belfast. He was shot by the IRA as an alleged informer.
- 5 May 1977: An ex-British soldier was shot dead by the IRA in the Andersonstown area of Belfast.
- 12 May 1977: Douglas Deering, a Justice of the Peace, was shot dead by the IRA in Rosslea, County Fermanagh.
- 14 May 1977: Undercover British Army and SAS Captain Robert Nairac was captured by the IRA in south County Armagh. He was shot dead. His body has never been found.
- 20 May 1977: An off-duty UDR soldier was shot dead while driving a school bus in near Benburb, County Tyrone.
- 21 May 1977: An ex-RUC officer was shot dead by the IRA in the Lisburn Road area of Belfast.
- 28 May 1977: Five improvised mortar shells were launched by the IRA at Warrenpoint docks. All the bombs fell short and exploded in the waters of Carlingford Lough. The mortar and two shells were later found by the Garda in Drummallagh, near Omeath. The Irish Army defused the devices.
- 30 May 1977: A civilian was shot dead by the IRA in College Square, Belfast. He was mistaken for an off-duty member of the British Army.
- 2 June 1977: Three members of a Royal Ulster Constabulary (RUC) mobile patrol were shot dead by Irish Republican Army (IRA) snipers near Ardboe, County Tyrone. Part of ongoing attacks on Police and Army.
- 8 June 1977: A UDR soldier was shot dead by the IRA after leaving the Victoria Hospital on the Falls Road, Belfast.
- 22 June 1977: A Prison Officer was shot dead by the IRA in a drive-by attack outside the Crumlin Road Prison in Belfast.
- 29 June 1977: Two British soldiers were killed when their patrol was ambushed by IRA snipers outside North Howards Street British Army base in Belfast.
- 6 July 1977: An RUC officer was shot dead by the IRA while sitting in a stationary patrol vehicle in Aughnacloy, County Tyrone.
- 22 July 1977: A Prison Officer was shot dead in Ballymoney, County Antrim.
- 27 July 1977: The IRA shot dead a UDR soldier at his home on Woodvale Avenue, Belfast.
- 27 July 1977: The IRA shot dead a Republican Clubs (political wing of the OIRA) member at Alexander House, Belfast, as part of a republican feud.
- 27 July 1977: An IRA volunteer was shot dead by the OIRA as he drove along Divismore Crescent in the Ballymurphy area of Belfast, as part of a republican feud.
- 9 August 1977: Fianna Éireann (IRA youth wing) volunteer Paul McWilliams was shot dead by a British Army sniper in Ballymurphy, Belfast.
- 9 August 1977: A British soldier was shot dead by an IRA sniper outside Henry Taggart British Army base in Ballymurphy, Belfast.
- 10 August 1977: The IRA planted a small bomb in the grounds of the New University of Ulster, which Queen Elizabeth II was visiting. The bomb exploded shortly after the Queen had left. There were no injuries and little damage.
- 12 August 1977: A British soldier was shot dead by an IRA sniper while on patrol in the Turf Lodge area of Belfast.
- 22 August 1977: A civilian was kidnapped from his home near Crossmaglen, County Armagh by the IRA and shot dead. The IRA claimed he was a British informer.
- 28 August 1977: A British soldier was shot dead by an IRA sniper while on foot patrol in the Ardoyne area of Belfast.
- 31 August 1977: A British soldier was shot dead by an IRA sniper while on a British Army mobile patrol in the Antrim Road area of Belfast.
- 7 September 1977: A civilian was shot dead by the IRA in a bar in Dublin. The IRA claimed he was an informer.
- 8 September 1977: A UDR soldier was shot dead by the IRA in the Finaghy area of Belfast.
- 13 September 1977: A UDR soldier was shot dead by an IRA sniper while driving a vehicle in Gortin, County Tyrone.
- 25 September 1977: A UDR soldier was shot dead by the IRA in Brantry, County Tyrone.
- 3 October 1977: Army border patrol came under fire from suspected IRA sniper at Flurrybridge
- 4 October 1977: Army helicopter came under fire from a concealed IRA sniper as it landed at Jonesborough, County Armagh. Windscreen shattered, no injuries.
- 6 October 1977:
  - Masked IRA intruders attempting to free republican prisoners were fought off by Gardaí and Irish soldiers at Portlaoise jail in the Irish Republic.
  - IRA volunteers held up electricity workers laying cable at Crossmaglen on a cross border link.
- 7 October 1977: A prison officer was shot dead by the IRA in the Wellington Park area of Belfast.
- 8 October 1977:
  - Chairman of NIPOA (Northern Ireland Prison Officers Association) 40-year-old Desmond Irvine shot dead by the IRA.
  - IRA gunmen opened fire on Forkhill RUC Station in South Armagh.
  - IRA bomb attack on the Royal Victoria Hospital in Belfast. Two women were injured.
  - A female UDR soldier was shot dead by the IRA in Tynan, County Armagh.
- 10 October 1977: Five separate IRA bomb attacks on NI cinemas – The Strand cinema in Belfast, the Tudor cinema in Comber, the Queen's cinema in Bangor, the Regal cinema in Larne and the Regent cinema in Newtownards.
- 12 October 1977: The IRA shot dead a civilian near Ballygawley, County Tyrone. The victim was mistaken for an off-duty UDR soldier.
- 14–19 October: Multiple IRA bomb attacks targeting commercial premises in Belfast.
- 18 October 1977: An ex-RUC officer was shot dead by the IRA near Keady, County Armagh.
- 19 October 1977:
  - The IRA shot dead a civilian at his home on Ainsworth Pass, Belfast. The motive for the killing remains unclear.
  - IRA bomb attacks on the homes of two prison officers in Belfast. No injuries.
- 22 October 1977:
  - 15 bombs planted by IRA targeting the NI rail network, stations and trains targeted with widespread disruption.
  - IRA gun attack on a policeman in Eglington near Derry as he drove away from his home. He was wounded in the thigh.
- 24 October 1977: For the second time in a month, Forkhill RUC station came under fire from IRA gunmen. No injuries.
- 26 October 1977: IRA bomb attack on Greenan Lodge Hotel in Dunmurry, South Belfast. No injuries, but the building was completely destroyed.
- 1 November 1977:
  - RUC officers came under gunfire as their car exited the M1 motorway at the Kennedy Lane roundabout in Andersontown. No injuries.
  - Multiple bomb alerts in Belfast city centre, both real and hoax.
- 2 November 1977:
  - IRA bomb attack on Homemaker Discount store on Strand Road, Derry.
  - IRA bomb attack on U Plan store on Lower Donegal Street, Belfast.
  - IRA bomb attack on large furniture store in the Duncairn area of Belfast.
  - UDR soldier was killed in an IRA booby-trap bomb attack in Magherafelt, County Londonderry.
- 3 November 1977: IRA bomb attack on Northern Furniture store on Dublin Road, Belfast.
- 4 November 1977:
  - Shootings
      - IRA gunmen opened fire on two RUCR officers sat in their vehicle. The officers returned fire and the assailants fled.
      - 21-year-old guardsmen Samuel Murphy was shot in the Andersonstown area of Belfast, he died on 14 November. Two IRA members would later be convicted for his murder.
  - Bombings
      - An unexploded IRA bomb found attached to the car of a police officer as he arrived at Castlereagh RUC station. It had been wired to his ignition switch, but had failed to detonate.
      - Blast-bomb thrown at a Sangar outside the Unity Flats in Belfast which was bring manned by soldiers. No injuries.
      - 25 incendiary bomb attacks mainly in Derry and Belfast targeting commercial premises.
      - Part-time UDR soldier survived an IRA assassination attempt at his farm in County Londonderry. Explosive device hidden in a manure heap and connected to a wheelbarrow.
- 8 November 1977:
  - Major wholesalers in Corporation Street, Belfast destroyed by IRA car bomb.
  - Ballylumford power station evacuated due to a hoax device.
- 9 November 1977: Three IRA attacks on commercial premises in Belfast city centre.
- 11 November 1977:
  - The IRA detonated a car bomb on King Street, Belfast. A warning was given to evacuate the area although one civilian was killed.
  - Arson attack by masked IRA gang who stormed the Kildress Inn in Tyrone.
  - Gallagher's tobacco factory on Henry Street, Belfast hit by several incendiary devices.
- 15 November 1977: Several hoax gas cylinders left across Belfast.
- 16 November 1977: Car bomb outside supermarket at Rasharkin, County Antrim.
- 18 November 1977:
  - IRA bomb left in the doorway of Polyprint Fabrics exploded on Lisburn Road, Belfast. Significant damage caused, no casualties.
  - Explosive device left in Spar shop in Cookstown, County Tyrone. Partially detonated with minimal damage caused,
- 19 November 1977: Two separate buildings set alight in Belfast as a come-on to security services with bombs planted nearby. No casualties.
- 21 November 1977: An Army VCP came under automatic gunfire (either GPMG or Bren) on Monaghan Road in Aughnacloy, County Tyrone close to the Irish border.
- 22 November 1977:
  - IRA incendiary device planted inside a for sale baby blanket intended to explode in-store. A young mother unwittingly purchased the item and discovered the device at her home in Glencairn Pass, Belfast.
  - Soldier injured by explosive device planted by a Co-op on Springfield Road, Belfast which had been deliberately attacked as a come-on to security services.
- Late November 1977:
  - Two young men injured as one device exploded outside a draper's shop on Ormeau Road, Belfast.
  - Major conflagration in Smithfield Market in Belfast caused by firebombs.
  - IRA proxy bomb caused major damage to Corry's timber yard in Belfast.
  - Explosive device left on prison officer's windowsill. No casualties.
- 28 November 1977: Attempted IRA bombing of Newtownhamilton RUC station. Device defused.
- 29 November 1977: Dub supermarket in Upper Malone, Belfast bombed by IRA.
- 30 November 1977: IRA bombing of two shops on Crumlin Road, Belfast.
- 1 December 1977:
  - Army disposed of two explosive devices left at Ellison's Wholsalers on Great Victoria Street, Belfast.
  - Two parcels dropped outside SKF Roller Bearings factory on Newtownards Road, Belfast exploded causing minor damage.
- 2 December 1977:
  - Armed masked men forced their way into G&S Wholesalers on Gordon Street, Belfast and planted an explosive device before fleeing. The bomb exploded while the building was being evacuated and two employees suffered minor injuries.
  - Barr's C&C on Agnes Street off Shankill Road bombed.
- 3 December 1977:
  - Seamus Twomey, a former Chief of Staff of the IRA was arrested in Dublin.
  - 23 people injured including seven RUC officers and a soldier by an IRA bomb at a large Wellworth's store in Dungannon.
  - RUC car ambushed by IRA gunmen firing automatic weapons at Clover Hill Bridge on Benburb Road near Moy, County Tyrone. Firefight ensued and the assailants fled across fields.
- 5/6 December 1977: Bomb blitz targeting industrial, commercial and transport infrastructure. Thirty devices exploded across the province.
- 8 December 1977:
  - IRA bomb blitz....
      - Firebomb attack on Co-op store on York Street, Belfast.
      - Mortar bombs placed in shop doorways on Albertbridge Road, Belfast made safe by EOD.
      - Army patrol attacked with grenades on Antrim Road, Belfast. No injuries.
      - Army patrol attacked with grenades on Grosvenor Road, Belfast. No injuries.
    - Army patrol attacked with grenades on Rosen Street, Belfast. No injuries.
      - Army patrol attacked with grenades in the Moyard district of Belfast. No injuries.
      - Twenty houses badly damaged by IRA bomb on Canterbury Street, Belfast.
      - Chinese restaurant firebombed by the IRA in the Waterside area of Derry.
- 13 December 1977:
  - Multiple IRA bombings across Belfast targeting commercial premises. Two soldiers injured when two gas cylinders planted in Jackson's Sport on Bedford Street exploded.
  - Attempted assassination of a part-time 51-year-old UDR soldier at his farm in Ballymena, County Antrim. A bomb exploded beneath his tractor causing serious injuries and a leg was amputated in hospital.
- 14 December 1977:
  - An undercover British soldier was shot dead in an IRA ambush in the Turf Lodge area of Belfast.
  - Two RUC officers injured by IRA bomb planted outside a florist on Lisburn Road, Belfast.
  - Two bombs exploded in Derry, damaging McDowell's electrical shop and Monaghan's furniture store.
- 15 December 1977: An UDR mobile border patrol was attacked by IRA gunmen with automatic weapons in Kinawley, County Fermanagh.
- 16 December 1977:
  - The IRA attempted the assassination of a suspected informer. Two gunmen opened fire at Ford's Cross in Crossmaglen on the lorry driver who veered across the road and overturned. He was treated for cuts and bruises.
  - The IRA failed to kill an off-duty RUC officer in Bangor as he drove home along Newtownards Road. The officer fired back and managed to survive the attack.
- 17 December 1977: The IRA fired on a RUC mobile patrol at Dromore, County Tyrone. Two officers suffered injuries.
- 18 December 1977: James Clifford, a 53-year-old Protestant civilian, was shot dead outside his home on Belgrave Street in the Shankill area of Belfast.
- 20 December 1977: An RUCR officer was maimed by an IRA booby-trap device planted beneath his car on Ashley Avenue, Belfast.
- 21 December 1977: Five hotels across Northern Ireland were damaged when IRA firebombs exploded in them.
- 22 December 1977: The IRA announced a Christmas ceasefire.

== 1978 ==
- 12 January 1978: A UDR soldier was shot dead by the IRA in Newry.
- 13 January 1978: The IRA seriously damaged the Guildhall, Derry, in a bomb attack. There were no injuries.
- 23 January 1978: A number of British soldiers were wounded and had to be airlifted to hospital following an IRA mortar attack on the British Army/RUC base in Forkill, County Armagh. The mortars were fired from a flatbed truck and hit the sleeping quarters. Afterward, three RUC officers were hurt by a booby-trap bomb planted in the truck.
- 30 January 1978: Bernard Brown, a Catholic supermarket employee (aged 50), originally from Northern Ireland, was shot and wounded during an IRA robbery of the premises in Killygordon, County Donegal. He died of his injuries on 3 February.
- 4 February 1978: A Protestant civilian, Martha McAlpine (aged 69), was accidentally shot dead during an IRA attack from a passing van on a RUC foot patrol outside Seaview football ground, Shore Road, Skegoneill, Belfast.
- 7 February 1978: An off-duty UDR soldier, John Eaglesham (aged 58), was shot dead by the IRA while delivering mail at The Rock, near Pomeroy, County Tyrone.
- 8 February 1978: A UDR soldier, William Gordon (aged 39), and his 10-year-old daughter, Lesley Gordon, were killed by a bomb planted under their car outside their home in Maghera, County Londonderry.
- 17 February 1978: Twelve Protestant civilians were killed and 23 badly injured in the La Mon Restaurant Bombing, at Comber near Belfast.
- 17 February 1978: British Lieutenant Colonel Ian Corden-Lloyd was killed, and two other soldiers injured, when the Gazelle helicopter he was travelling in was attacked by an IRA unit. The helicopter crashed while taking evasive manoeuvers during the engagement.
- 26 February 1978: An IRA volunteer, Paul Duffy (aged 23), was shot dead by an undercover British Army unit at an arms cache in the yard of an unoccupied farmhouse in the Coagh/Ardboe area, County Tyrone.
- 28 February 1978: An RUC officer, Charles Simpson (aged 26), was shot dead in an IRA sniper attack on a RUC mobile patrol at junction of Clarendon and Francis streets in Rosemount, Derry.
- 1 March 1978: A British soldier, Paul Sheppard (aged 20), was killed in a machine gun attack on a British Army mobile patrol, Cliftonpark Avenue, Belfast.
- 3 March 1978: The IRA launched a gun attack on a British Army pedestrian checkpoint on Donegall Street, Belfast. A soldier, James Nowosad (aged 21), and a female civilian, Norma Spence (aged 25), who helped search female suspects, were shot dead.
- 4 March 1978: A British soldier, Nicholas Smith (aged 20), was killed by a booby-trap bomb in Crossmaglen, County Armagh. Smith was killed while attempting to remove an Irish flag from a telegraph pole; the flag had been wired to a landmine below the pole and exploded when it was removed.
- 17 March 1978: An IRA unit and an SAS unit became embroiled in a gun battle in a field at Lisnamuck, near Maghera, County Londonderry. One British soldier, David Jones (aged 23), was shot dead in the battle. A prominent IRA member, Francis Hughes, was wounded and captured following the shootout. Hughes died on hunger strike in 1981.
- 14 April 1978: A UDR soldier was shot dead while driving a school bus near Pomeroy, County Tyrone.
- 15 April 1978: An RUC officer was killed in a booby-trap bomb attack outside his home near Armoy, County Antrim.
- 22 April 1978: An RUC officer was shot dead by the IRA at his home in Lisburn.
- 25 May 1978: Two civilians were kidnapped by the IRA in Belfast and later killed and secretly buried. Their remains were found in 1999 in County Monaghan. The two had been executed for robbing an IRA-run bar. They reportedly admitted stealing IRA weapons for use in robberies, but had apparently handed back the weapons and any money they gained from robberies.
- 3 June 1978: An alleged criminal was shot dead by the IRA near Jonesborough, County Armagh.
- 10 June 1978: An IRA volunteer was shot dead by undercover British soldiers while hijacking a car in the Bogside area of Derry City.
- 16 June 1978: An RUC officer was shot dead by the IRA in the Foyle Street area of Derry.
- 17 June 1978: An IRA unit ambushed an RUC vehicle near Camlough, County Armagh. One RUC officer was killed outright and another was wounded and captured. The IRA gave back the body of the second officer on 9 July. A post-mortem revealed he had died of his wounds soon after the ambush.
- 20 June 1978: Three IRA volunteers and a passing UVF member were shot dead by undercover British soldiers during an attempted bombing at a Post Office depot on Ballysillan Road, Belfast.
- 25 June 1978: A UDR soldier was shot dead by during a bomb and sniper ambush of a British military convoy near Belcoo, County Fermanagh.
- 4 July 1978: A RUC officer was shot dead by the IRA outside Castlederg RUC barracks in County Tyrone.
- 12 July 1978: A British soldier was killed in an IRA radio-controlled booby-trap bomb attack while on foot-patrol in Crossmaglen, County Armagh.
- 19 July 1978: A British soldier was killed in an IRA remote-controlled bomb attack in Dungannon, County Tyrone.
- 2 August 1978: An RUC officer was shot dead in an IRA drive-by shooting while on foot-patrol in Ballymena, County Antrim.
- 8 August 1978: A Catholic civilian, Mary McCaffrey (aged 65), was critically wounded when a bomb exploded near her home on Forfar Street, off Springfield Road, Belfast. It is thought that it was planted by the IRA and meant for a British Army patrol. She died of her wounds on 27 September 1978.
- 11 August 1978: An undercover British soldier was shot dead in an IRA ambush on the Letterkenny Road in Derry.
- 17 August 1978: A British soldier was killed in an IRA car bomb attack on a British patrol in Forkill, County Armagh.
- 18 August 1978: Eight bombs were found or exploded in and near establishments of the British Army of the Rhine in Germany. One person suffered minor injuries. A week later a car bomb was found at Rhine Army HQ.
- 19 August 1978: Two former British soldiers were killed in IRA gun attacks in Belfast and Keady.
- 5 September 1978: A British soldier was shot dead by the IRA in Newry.
- 11 September 1978: The IRA shot dead an off-duty RUC officer in Loughmacrory, County Tyrone.
- 21 September 1978: The IRA carried out a large bomb attack against Eglington airfield. The terminal building, two hangars and four planes were destroyed in the attack. There were no injuries.
- 28 September 1978: The IRA launched a gun attack on a British Army foot-patrol on Waterloo Place, Derry. A civilian who helped the British Army to search people was shot dead.
- 29 September 1978: The IRA fired shots at the car of an RUC officer in Newry. A civilian who was travelling in the car was accidentally shot dead but not the officer.
- 6 October 1978: A UDR soldier was shot dead while at a cattlemart in Newry.
- 12 October 1978: A civilian was killed when the IRA bombed a train at Belfast Central station. A bomb warning was given but there was not enough time to carry out a full evacuation.
- 12 November 1978: A British soldier was killed when an IRA booby trap bomb detonated as a British patrol passed by in Crossmaglen, County Armagh.
- 14 November 1978: The IRA launched a large-scale bombing offensive in towns across Northern Ireland. Serious damage was caused to the centres of Castlederg, Enniskillen, Armagh, Belfast and Cookstown. There were 37 injuries in the attacks although warnings were issued.
- 16 November 1978: A fire officer, Wesley Orr (aged 53), was killed when an IRA grenade exploded at Bass Brewery, which had been set alight, Glen Road, Andersonstown, Belfast.
- 24 November 1978: An IRA volunteer (Patrick Duffy, aged 50) was shot dead by undercover British Army soldiers at an arms cache in an unoccupied house on Maureen Avenue, off Abercorn Road, Derry.
- 26 November 1978: The Deputy-Governor of Long Kesh Prison, Albert Miles (aged 50), was shot dead by the IRA outside his home, Evelyn Gardens, off Cavehill Road, Belfast.
- 27 November 1978: An off-duty UDR soldier, Robert Bachelor (aged 36), was shot dead by the IRA just after he left his workplace, Institution Place, near Durham Street, Belfast.
- 30 November 1978: The IRA carried out 14 bomb attacks in towns and villages across Northern Ireland. The IRA issued a statement saying it was preparing for a "long-war".
- 1 December 1978: The IRA carried out 11 bomb attacks on towns across Northern Ireland. There were no injuries.
- 14 December 1978: A Prison Officer, John McTier (aged 33), died three days after being shot by the IRA while leaving Crumlin Road Prison, Belfast.
- 17 December 1978: The IRA carried out bomb attacks on cities in England including Bristol, Coventry, Liverpool, Manchester and Southampton.
- 19 December 1978: A British soldier, James Burney (aged 26), was shot dead by an IRA sniper while guarding other soldiers who were raiding a house on Baltic Avenue, New Lodge, Belfast.
- 21 December 1978: Crossmaglen ambush – A four-man IRA unit ambushed a British patrol near St. Patrick's church in Crossmaglen, County Armagh. The IRA unit fired a large number of shots from three Armalites and one AK-47. Three British soldiers, Graham Duggan (aged 22), Kevin Johnson (aged 20), and Glen Ling (aged 18), were killed in an IRA ambush while on foot patrol. The army unit returned fire but the IRA unit made its escape in an armour-plated van.

== 1979 ==
- 5 January 1979: Two IRA volunteers were killed in Ardoyne, Belfast, when the bomb they were transporting in a car exploded prematurely.
- 4 February 1979: Former prison officer Patrick Mackin (60), and his wife Violet (58), were shot dead by the IRA at their home in Oldpark Road, Belfast. This was part of an escalating campaign against prison officers, co-inciding with the Dirty protest and Blanket protest in the Maze prison.
- 14 February 1979: A British soldier was shot dead by an IRA sniper on the Abercorn road in Derry.
- 24 February 1979: Two Catholic teenagers, (Martin McGuigan and James Keenan) were killed by a remote controlled bomb hidden in a trailer near Keady, County Armagh. The IRA said they were mistaken for a British Army patrol.
- 3 March 1979: An Army Air Corps Gazelle was heavily damaged when engaged with machine gun fire by an IRA unit at Glassdrumman, County Armagh, Both the pilot and a Grenadier Guards Major were wounded. In spite of his injuries, the pilot flew the battered helicopter back to Crossmaglen base.
- 19 March 1979: An IRA unit launched a mortar attack on Newtownhamilton British army base. One British soldier was killed.
- 22 March 1979: Richard Sykes, then British Ambassador to the Netherlands, and his Dutch valet, Krel Straub, were killed in a gun attack in The Hague, Netherlands. The IRA also carried out 24 bomb attacks across Northern Ireland.
- 5 April 1979: Two British soldiers were killed when IRA snipers attacked the Andersonstown British Army barracks in Belfast.
- 11 April 1979: Two British soldiers were killed when IRA snipers ambushed their armoured mobile patrol in Ballymurphy, Belfast.
- 13 April 1979: An off-duty UDR soldier was shot dead by the IRA in Tynan, County Armagh.
- 16 April 1979: An IRA unit shot dead a Prison Officer in Clogher, County Tyrone.
- 17 April 1979: Four RUC officers were killed when the IRA exploded an estimated 1,000 pound van bomb at Bessbrook, County Armagh, believed to be the largest bomb used by the IRA up to that point.
- 19 April 1979: In Belfast a British soldier was shot dead by an IRA sniper.
- 25 April 1979: A UDR soldier was shot dead by an IRA sniper while driving a lorry in County Tyrone.
- 29 April 1979: A UDR soldier was shot dead by an IRA sniper in Edendork, County Tyrone.
- 6 May 1979: Two undercover British soldiers were shot dead by an IRA unit which ambushed their vehicle in Lisnaskea, County Fermanagh.
- 9 May 1979: A British soldier was killed in an IRA bomb attack on his foot-patrol in the Turf Lodge area of Belfast.
- 19 May 1979: An ex-UDR man was shot dead by the IRA while delivering bread to a shop in Garrison, County Fermanagh
- 20 May 1979: An RUC officer was shot dead by the IRA outside of a church in Derry.
- 3 June 1979: Two RUC officers were killed when the IRA detonated a bomb underneath their patrol vehicle near Crossmaglen, County Armagh.
- 6 June 1979: A UDR soldier was shot dead in an IRA attack on a British Army base on the Malone Road in Belfast.
- 9 June 1979: During a gun battle between the IRA and the British Army, an IRA volunteer was shot dead.
- 19 June 1979: A UDR soldier was shot dead by the IRA in Omagh, County Tyrone.
- 22 June 1979: An RUC officer was shot dead by the IRA near Coagh, County Tyrone.
- 24 June 1979: An off-duty UDR soldier was shot dead by the IRA while at his home in Markethill, County Armagh.
- 25 June 1979: A bombing believed to have been carried out by the IRA narrowly missed NATO Supreme Commander Alexander Haig as he travelled outside Brussels in Belgium. It is believed the intended target was a British General attached to NATO.
- 6 July 1979: The IRA detonated a small bomb at the British Consulate in Antwerp, Belgium, causing damage but no injuries
- 8 July 1979: A British soldier was killed in an IRA bomb attack on his foot patrol in Crossmaglen, County Armagh.
- 12 July 1979: Two IRA bombs exploded at a barracks of the British Army of the Rhine in Dortmund, West Germany, causing extensive damage but no injuries.
- 15 July 1979: A Catholic civilian was shot dead in the car-park of Falls Bowling Club on Andersonstown Road, Belfast. The Sutton Database claims that he was shot by the IRA. However, Lost Lives claims that the IRA denied responsibility and says that there is no obvious motive.
- 17 July 1979: An IRA unit launched a bomb attack on a British Army patrol in Rosslea, County Fermanagh. A civilian who was in the area was killed by shrapnel.
- 2 August 1979: Two British soldiers were killed by the IRA in a landmine attack at Cathedral Road, Armagh town. In Belfast, an RUC officer was shot dead by an IRA sniper.
- 3 August 1979: A Protestant civilian died after being injured by a bomb attack on a hotel in Ballycastle, County Antrim on 19 June.
- 7 August 1979: A civilian, Eamon Ryan, was shot dead by the IRA during a bank robbery in Tramore, County Waterford.
- 10 August 1979: A Protestant civilian was shot dead outside his home in Garvagh, County Londonderry. He was mistake for his brother who was a member of the UDR.
- 27 August 1979: An IRA bomb killed Earl Mountbatten of Burma at Mullaghmore, County Sligo the British Queen's first cousin, as well as The Dowager Baroness Brabourne, Mountbatten's elder daughter's mother-in-law (aged 83), The Hon. Nicholas Knatchbull, Mountbatten's elder daughter's fourth son (aged 14) and Paul Maxwell, a 15‑year-old Protestant youth from County Fermanagh who was working as a crew member. On the same day, the IRA launched the Warrenpoint ambush, which resulted in the deaths of 18 British soldiers at Narrow Water Castle, near Warrenpoint, County Down. As a British convoy passed, the IRA unit detonated a roadside bomb, killing six soldiers. IRA sniper fire then drove the soldiers to cover behind a nearby gatehouse, where a second bomb was detonated and killed a further twelve.
- 28 August 1979: Four British soldiers were wounded when the IRA detonates a bomb under a bandstand in Brussels, Belgium, as British Army musicians were preparing to perform.
- 14 September 1979: A Prison Officer was shot dead by the IRA off the Crumlin Road in Belfast.
- 19 September 1979: A Prison Officer was shot dead by the IRA outside the Crumlin Road Prison in Belfast.
- 5 October 1979: A former UDR soldier was shot dead while driving his car into car park in Newry, County Down.
- 8 October 1979: An undercover British soldier was shot dead when his car was ambushed by an IRA unit on the Falls Road, Belfast.
- 12 October 1979: The IRA shot dead a solicitor as he left Andersonstown British Army/RUC base in Belfast.
- 15 October 1979: A UDR soldier was shot dead by the IRA in Roslea, County Fermanagh.
- 17 October 1979: An IRA unit armed with M60 machine guns and RPG-7 rocket launchers occupied the border village of Carrickmore, County Tyrone for three hours. The incident was filmed by a BBC Panorama crew leading to friction between the BBC and Margaret Thatcher's government.
- 19 October 1979: An off-duty UDR soldier was shot dead by the IRA in Fintona, County Tyrone.
- 24 October 1979: A Protestant civilian was shot dead outside his home in Lyndhurst Parade, off Ballygomartin Road, Belfast.
- 28 October 1979: A British soldier and an RUC officer were killed when an IRA unit launched a heavy machine gun attack on Springfield Road Barracks, Belfast,
- 29 October 1979: An off-duty UDR soldier was shot dead by the IRA in Dungannon, County Tyrone.
- 5 November 1979: A Prison Officer was shot dead by the IRA outside the Crumlin Road Prison, in Belfast.
- 13 November 1979: A British Beaver reconnaissance aircraft was hit six times by an IRA unit which had mounted a roadblock in South Armagh. In Crossmaglen, a British soldier was killed in an IRA booby-trap bomb attack.
- 23 November 1979: A Prison Officer was shot dead by the IRA while at his home in Glengormley, County Antrim.
- 3 December 1979: A Prison Officer was shot dead by the IRA at his home in Belfast.
- 16 December 1979: Dungannon land mine attack – A landmine bomb killed four British soldiers near Dungannon, County Tyrone. Another soldier was killed by a booby-trap bomb planted in a concealed observation post in a derelict house at Forkill, County Armagh. A former member of the Ulster Defence Regiment (UDR), James Fowler, was shot dead by the IRA in Omagh, County Tyrone.
- 17 December 1979: A Prison Officer was shot dead by the IRA off the Crumlin Road in Belfast.
- 22 December 1979: An off-duty RUC officer travelling in his car was shot dead by an IRA sniper in County Monaghan.

== See also ==
- Timeline of Continuity IRA actions
- Timeline of Real IRA and New IRA actions
- Timeline of Irish National Liberation Army actions
- Timeline of Official Irish Republican Army actions
- Timeline of Ulster Volunteer Force actions
- Timeline of Ulster Defence Association actions
- Timeline of the Troubles
- List of attacks on British aircraft during The Troubles
