= List of terrorist incidents in 1975 =

This is a timeline of incidents in 1975 that have been labelled as "terrorism" and are not believed to have been carried out by a government or its forces (see state terrorism and state-sponsored terrorism).

== Guidelines ==
- To be included, entries must be notable (have a stand-alone article) and described by a consensus of reliable sources as "terrorism".
- List entries must comply with the guidelines outlined in the manual of style under MOS:TERRORIST.
- Casualties figures in this list are the total casualties of the incident including immediate casualties and later casualties (such as people who succumbed to their wounds long after the attacks occurred).
- Casualties listed are the victims. Perpetrator casualties are listed separately (e.g. x (+y) indicate that x victims and y perpetrators were killed/injured).
- Casualty totals may be underestimated or unavailable due to a lack of information. A figure with a plus (+) sign indicates that at least that many people have died (e.g. 10+ indicates that at least 10 people have died) – the actual toll could be considerably higher. A figure with a plus (+) sign may also indicate that over that number of people are victims.
- If casualty figures are 20 or more, they will be shown in **bold**. In addition, figures for casualties more than 50 will also be **underlined**.
- Incidents are limited to one per location per day. If multiple attacks occur in the same place on the same day, they will be merged into a single incident.
- In addition to the guidelines above, the table also includes the following categories:

0 people were killed/injured by the incident.
1–19 people were killed/injured by the incident.
20–49 people were killed/injured by the incident.
50–99 people were killed/injured by the incident.
100+ people were killed/injured by the incident.

== List ==
Date	Type	Dead	Injured	Location	Details	Perpetrator	Part of
January 13, 19	RPG attacks, shooting, hostage-taking	0	23	Paris, France	El Al aircraft at Paris-Orly Airport, were subject to attempted RPG attacks by Popular Front for the Liberation of Palestine (PFLP) terrorists led by Carlos the Jackal. While the intended attacks failed, collateral damage was suffered, and the second attack resulted in gunfighting and a seventeen-hour hostage situation.	PFLP	Israeli–Palestinian conflict
January 19	Shooting	0	12	London, United Kingdom	The IRA fired shots into the Carlton Tower Hotel and later the Portman Hotel. 12 people were injured from both attacks.	Provisional IRA's Balcombe Street Gang; PIRA	The Troubles
January 23	Bombing	0	3	London, United Kingdom	A bomb planted at a pumping station injured three people.	Provisional IRA's Balcombe Street Gang; PIRA	The Troubles
January 24	Bombing	4	53	New York City, United States	At 1:29 p.m., a bomb explodes at the historic Fraunces Tavern at the corner of Pearl and Broad streets in the Financial District, Manhattan. The Puerto Rican nationalist group Fuerzas Armadas de Liberación Nacional Puertorriqueña (FALN) claimed responsibility in message found in a nearby telephone booth. Four people were killed (three of them immediately and a fourth at a hospital) and 53 others were injured.	FALN	
January 28	Bombings	0	0	Washington, D.C. and Oakland, California, United States	A bomb explodes at the Vietnam section of the U.S. Agency for International Development in Washington, D.C. A second bomb was planted at the Department of Defense Supply Agency building in Oakland, California, but fails to detonate. The extremist Weather Underground group was responsible for both attacks.	Weather Underground	
January 31	Kidnapping	0	1	Cali, Colombia	FARC guerrillas kidnap Dutch consul Erick Leupin.	FARC	Colombian Conflict
February 26	Shooting	1	0	London, United Kingdom	Police Constable Stephen Tibble, 22, of the London Metropolitan Police Service, was fatally shot three times at point-blank range by Liam Quinn, a Provisional Irish Republican Army gunman escaping from an IRA bomb factory in Baron's Court, West London. Quinn fled to San Francisco and was extradited to face trial in Britain 13 years later. Sentenced to life with a recommended minimum sentence of 30 years in 1988, Quinn was freed in April 1999 under the Good Friday Agreement.	Liam Quinn; PIRA	The Troubles
March 1	Bombing	26	60	Nairobi, Kenya	An explosion aboard a Nairobi–Mombasa regular route bus kills 26 and injures another 60. The Kenyan People Liberation Front claimed responsibility for the blast [cite?].	Kenyan People Liberation Front	
March 2	Bombings	0	0	Toulouse and Lyon, France	Air Algérie's offices were bombed by the Charles Martel Group. No one was killed or injured in either attack.	Charles Martel Group	
March 3	Plot	0	0	Netherlands	Two Moluccans were arrested after weapons were found to be hidden in their car during traffic stop. It was later discovered that they had intended to kidnap Queen Juliana of the Netherlands.	Moluccan freedom fighters	
March 4–5	Shooting, hostage-taking	11 (+7)		Tel Aviv, Israel	In the Savoy Operation, Palestine Liberation Organization gunmen from Lebanon take dozens of hostages at the Savoy Hotel, eventually killing eight hostages and three IDF soldiers, and wounding eleven hostages.	PLO	Israeli–Palestinian conflict
April 5	Mountainview Tavern attack	5	50+	Belfast, United Kingdom	Members of the Provisional IRA bombed a bar that was frequented by Ulster Protestants. 1 Ulster Defence Association member and four civilians were killed and at least 50 people were injured with the bar being packed with people on a busy Saturday night.	PIRA	The Troubles
April 12	Strand Bar bombing	6	50+	Short Strand, Belfast, United Kingdom	Members of the Red Hand Commando (RHC) (a group linked to the Ulster Volunteer Force ) lobbed a bomb into the Strand Bar and shot at anyone trying to escape, the blast killed six people all local Catholic civilians: Mary McAleavey (57), Elizabeth Carson (64), Marie Bennett (42), Agnes McAnoy (62), Arthur Penn (33) and Michael Mulligan (33) and injured at least 50 others as the bar was packed on a busy Saturday night.	Red Hand Commando (RHC)	The Troubles
April 10	Attack	2	Unknown	Caquetá, Colombia	Nearly 50 guerrillas assault the town of Puerto Rico. Two policemen die.	FARC	Colombian conflict
April 19	Bombing	0	5+	New York City, United States	FALN sets off four bombs within a forty-minute period in Manhattan, injuring at least five people.	FALN	
April 24	Hostage-taking	2 (+2)	10 (+4)	Stockholm, Sweden	West German embassy siege: Six Red Army Faction (Baader-Meinhof) terrorists hold 11 people (including the German ambassador) hostage for almost 12 hours in the West German embassy. During the siege, two of the hostages (military attaché Colonel Andreas von Mirbach and economics attaché Heinz Hallagaart) were killed by faction members. Shortly before midnight, dynamite exploded and set the building on fire. The ambassador and the other nine hostages escaped from the embassy, mostly with only light injuries.	Red Army Faction	
April 27	Bleary Darts Club shooting	3	1	Bleary, County Down, United Kingdom	Members of the Ulster Volunteer Force (UVF) burst into a darts club frequented by Catholics and opened fire on the crowd inside the small building, killing three civilians & injuring a fourth civilian who survived the attack.	Ulster Volunteer Force	The Troubles
April 28	Hostage-taking, siege, shooting	4	82	Johannesburg, South Africa	1975 Fox Street siege was instigated by David Protter, a South African Jew, who seized about 20–30 hostages at the Israeli Consulate General where he worked as a security officer. After killing two consulate employees Protter opened fire on pedestrians and motorists in Fox and Von Brandis Streets, killing 2 and wounding 82. He surrendered to police early the next morning (29 April).	David Protter	
May 28	Shooting, Clash	0 (+2)	1 (+3)	Tucumán, Argentina	Part of Operativo Independencia: An armed confrontation between members of the People's Revolutionary Army (ERP) and the Argentine Army in Manchalá, near Rio Colorado.	ERP	Dirty War
June 1	Hostage-taking	3 (+4)		Kfar Yuval, Israel	Kfar Yuval hostage crisis	Arab Liberation Front	Israeli–Palestinian conflict
June 22	Shooting, bombing	12	0	Zerok, Afghanistan	HN launched an assault against the pro-Daoud governor in Paktika province.	Haqqani Network	
July 4	Bombing	15	77	Jerusalem	A bomb detonates in Zion Square killing 13 people and wounding 72. The Israeli Ministry of Foreign Affairs states the death toll at 14 with 80 injured.	PLO	Israeli–Palestinian conflict
July 14 – August	Shooting	2	1	Spain	A FRAP command kills a member of the Armed Police. Shortly afterwards another police officer is seriously injured and in August members of the FRAP assassinate a lieutenant of the Civil Guard.	FRAP	
July 26	Shooting	10	Unknown	Boyacá, Colombia	Members of the FARC attack a column of civilians at Guaduas Negras in Otanche that was preparing to rescue the corpse of a farmer accused of being an informant in the Army. Ten civilians die.	FARC	Colombian conflict
July 31	Shooting, bombing	3 (+2)	2	County Down, United Kingdom	Members of the Ulster Volunteer Force (UVF) attempt to plant a bomb on the tourbus of popular Irish band Miami Showband at a bogus military checkpoint. The bomb exploded prematurely and killed two UVF members. Other UVF members then opened fire killing three band members and injuring two others.	Ulster Volunteer Force	The Troubles
August 5	Hostage-taking	0	0	Kuala Lumpur, Malaysia	Five Japanese Red Army members took 53 hostages at the American Insurance Association. The siege ended after five other JRA members were released from prison.	Japanese Red Army	
August 12	Shooting, bombing	5	50+	Belfast, United Kingdom	Members of the Provisional IRA open fire and bomb a bar that was frequented by Ulster Volunteer Force members. 1 UVF member and four civilians were killed.	PIRA	The Troubles
August 26	Shooting, Assassination	1	0	Córdoba, Argentina	A Montoneros member, Fernando Haymal, was shot dead for giving information to the Córdoba Provincial Police after being arrested. According to Montoneros he was guilty of the charges of "traitor and delator".	Montoneros	Dirty War
August 27	Bombing	0	33	Caterham, United Kingdom	Bombing of the Caterham Arms public house by the Provisional IRA.	PIRA	The Troubles
August 28	Bombing	6	29	San Miguel de Tucumán, Argentina	Operation Gardel was the key name given by the Montoneros to the bombing of a Lockheed C-130 Hercules of Group 1 of Transport of the First Air Brigade during takeoff at the International Airport Lieutenant General Benjamín Matienzo, carrying 114 gendarmes, killing six and wounding 29.	Montoneros	Dirty War
September 1	Shooting	5	7	County Armagh, United Kingdom	Five Protestant civilians were killed and seven were wounded in a gun attack on Tullyvallen Orange Hall near Newtownhamilton. One of the Orangemen was an off-duty RUC officer, who returned fire. The attack was claimed by the South Armagh Republican Action Force (SARAF), which claimed it was retaliation for "the assassinations of fellow Catholics in Belfast".	PIRA	The Troubles
September 5	London Hilton bombing	2	63	London, United Kingdom	A bomb exploded at the Hilton Hotel. Two people were killed and 63 were injured. Scotland Yard received a warning a few minutes before the blast, but was unable to get the building evacuated in time.	Provisional IRA's Balcombe Street Gang; PIRA	The Troubles
September 5	Assassination attempt	0	0	Sacramento, United States	Former Manson Family member Lynette "Squeaky" Fromme attempts to assassinate U.S. President Gerald Ford due to his failure to protect ATWA. Her gun failed to fire and she was arrested.	Lynette Fromme	
September 8	Assassination	1	0	Colombia	The ELN kills the Inspector General of the Armed Forces General Ramón Arturo Rincón Quiñónez.	ELN	Colombian conflict
September 22	Assassination attempt	0	1	San Francisco, United States	Sarah Jane Moore tries to assassinate President Gerald Ford. The attempt fails when a bystander grabs her arm and deflects the shot. Moore stated the motive was to create chaos to bring "the winds of change" because the U.S. government had declared war on the left.	Sarah Jane Moore	
October 2	Shooting, Bombing	11		Northern Ireland, United Kingdom	The Ulster Volunteer Force (UVF) killed seven civilians in a series of attacks. Six were Catholics and one was a Protestant. Four UVF members were killed when the bomb they were transporting prematurely exploded as they drove along the Farrenlester road in Coleraine, County Londonderry.	UVF	The Troubles
October 5	Shooting, Attack	17 (+15)	30+	Formosa, Argentina	A group of 50 guerrillas assaulted the Infantry Regiment of Monte 29, the Subofficers' Casino of that force and the Airport El Pucú. The event was called by its perpetrators as Operation Primicia.	Montoneros	Dirty War
October 6	Attempted assassination	0	2	Rome, Italy	Attempt to assassinate Bernardo Leighton by the Chilean secret police and National Vanguard. Leighton and his wife were seriously injured.	National Vanguard; DINA	
October 6	Shooting, Clash	1 (+12)	1 (+Unknown)	Acheral, Tucumán, Argentina	At least one soldier and 12 ERP militants were shot dead in a confrontation of the so-called Operativo Independencia.	ERP	Operativo Independencia
9 October	Green Park Tube Station Bombing	1	20	London, United Kingdom	The IRA left a bomb at a bus stop just outside Green Park tube station. One person was killed and 20 were injured.	Provisional IRA's Balcombe Street Gang; PIRA	The Troubles
23 October	Bombing	1	0	London, United Kingdom	The IRA planted a booby-trap bomb under the car of Conservative MP Hugh Fraser. A passer-by noticed the bomb under the car, and by mistake detonated the device killing himself.	Provisional IRA's Balcombe Street Gang; PIRA	The Troubles
30 October	Bombing	0	17	London, United Kingdom	An IRA unit exploded a bomb at the Trattoria Fiore in Mount Street W1 which injured 17 people.	Provisional IRA's Balcombe Street Gang; PIRA	The Troubles
12 November	Scott's (restaurant) bombing	1	15	London, United Kingdom	One person was killed and 15 others injured when the IRA without threw a bomb into a Mayfair restaurant on Mount Street.	Provisional IRA's Balcombe Street Gang; PIRA	The Troubles
November 18	Bombing	2	23	London, United Kingdom	Bombing of Walton's Restaurant in the Chelsea neighborhood by the Provisional IRA.	PIRA	The Troubles
November 22	Ambush	3	1	County Armagh, United Kingdom	Members of the Provisional IRA attack British soldiers near the Northern Ireland–Republic of Ireland border, killing three and wounding one.	PIRA	The Troubles
November 27	Shooting, Assassination	1	0	London, United Kingdom	A PIRA active service unit shot dead Guinness Book of Records founder Ross McWhirter at his home.	Provisional IRA's Balcombe Street Gang; PIRA	The Troubles
December 2	Shooting, Assassination	2	0	Paraná, Argentina	General Jorge Esteban Cáceres Monié and his wife Beatriz Isabel Sasiain were murdered by members of the guerrilla Montoneros (who called it "Operativo Cacerola") at approximately 19:00 hours on the way from Villa Urquiza to Paraná (province of Entre Ríos), when they were in their pickup truck rafting the Las Conchas stream.	Montoneros	Dirty War
December 2–14	Hostage-taking	3		Wijster, Netherlands	Seven Moluccans hijack a train in hopes of forcing the Dutch government to recognize the Republic of South Maluku as an independent state. They kill three hostages before surrendering.	Moluccan freedom fighters	
December 4–19	Hostage crises	1 (indirect)		Amsterdam, Netherlands	Seven Moluccans took hostages at the Indonesian Consulate. One hostage died while attempting to escape by climbing down a rope along the side of the building.	Moluccan freedom fighters	
December 6–12	Hostage-taking, siege	0	0	London, United Kingdom	Four members of the Provisional IRA take two people hostage in a flat for six days before surrendering.	PIRA	The Troubles
December 19	Bombing	5	26	Dundalk, Ireland, and Silverbridge, United Kingdom	The loyalist paramilitary Red Hand Commando exploded a no-warning car bomb in Dundalk, killing two civilians and wounding twenty. Shortly after, the same group launched a gun and bomb attack across the border in Silverbridge. Two local Catholic civilians and an English civilian, married to a local woman, were killed in that attack, while six others were wounded. The attacks have been linked to the "Glenanne gang".	RHC	The Troubles
December 21–22	Hostage-taking, siege	3		Austria	Carlos the Jackal and his rebels attacked OPEC headquarters in Vienna and took over 60 hostages, mostly OPEC countries' leaders. On December 22, the hostages and rebels were transported in a DC-9 to Algiers, where 30 hostages were freed; the plane was then flown to Tripoli, Libya, where more hostages were freed, before flying back to Algiers where the remaining hostages were freed and the rebels were granted asylum.	Arm of the Arab Revolution	
December 23	Shooting	1		Athens, Greece	U.S. Central Intelligence Agency Station Chief Richard Welch was shot dead outside his home by Marxist terrorist group Revolutionary Organization 17 November. Welch's murder led to the passage of the Intelligence Identities Protection Act of 1982, making it illegal to reveal the name of an agent who has a covert relationship with an American intelligence organization.	Revolutionary Organization 17 November	
December 23–24	Shooting, Air Raid	14–50 (92+)	34 (+25)	Buenos Aires, Argentina	A failed assault on the Battalion Arsenals Depot 601 Domingo Viejobueno, in the town of Monte Chingolo, was the last great action of the People's Revolutionary Army. It aimed to appropriate 20 tons of weaponry. The attack was frustrated by the Argentine army, Federal Police and Police of the Province of Buenos Aires, and the Air Force. 30 guerrillas who surrendered were later shot dead by the army.	ERP	Dirty War
December 29	Bombing	11	75	New York City, United States	1975 LaGuardia Airport bombing: At 6:30 p.m., an explosion occurs at the lower-level TWA and Delta Air Lines baggage claim area at the La Guardia Airport, in Queens, killing 11 and injuring more than 75. The blast set off a fire, which firefighters managed to suppress. The physical damage was estimated at $750,000. An investigation revealed that about 25 sticks (12.5 pounds) of dynamite were placed in a parcel locker between two luggage carousels. The crime remains unsolved today, although Croatian nationalists are believed to be the perpetrators.	Croatian nationalists (suspected)	
31 December	Central Bar bombing	3	30	Gilford, United Kingdom	Irish National Liberation Army (INLA) members using the covername "Armagh People's Republican Army" killed 3 people in a bomb attack on a pub.	INLA	The Troubles

== See also ==
- List of terrorist incidents
