= 1975 Piccadilly bombing =

Bomb attack near Green Park Underground station, London

Coordinates: 51.5067°N 0.1427°W

- Part of the Troubles
- Aftermath of the bombing
- Location: Piccadilly, London
- Date: 9 October 1975; 21:00 (GMT)
- Target: Ritz Hotel London
- Attack type: Time Bomb
- Weapon: gelignite bomb
- Deaths: 1
- Injuries: 20
- Perpetrator: Provisional IRA

On Thursday 9 October 1975, a bomb attack just outside Green Park Underground station in the City of Westminster, London, left one man dead and injured 20 others. The attack was carried out by volunteers from the Provisional IRA's Balcombe Street Gang. The attack occurred during a period of heightened activity by the IRA in England and in particular London and surrounding areas, since the Caterham Arms pub bombing two months earlier in August 1975.

== Background ==
In March 1973 the Provisional IRA bombed England for the first time when they bombed the Old Bailey courthouse in the centre of London, killing one person and injuring over 200.

During summer 1974 the IRA launched a string of attacks in England, which included a letter bomb campaign and the bombing of Westminster Hall. In October 1974 a new, more intense bombing campaign was launched in England by the IRA Active Service Unit known as the Balcombe Street gang.

In February 1975 the IRA agreed to a long term truce with the British government. The truce officially lasted until January 1976, but the IRA broke the truce on 27 August 1975 when they bombed a pub in Caterham, Surrey injuring over 30 people. A month before the bombing outside Green Park station, the IRA unit bombed the Hilton Hotel in London on 5 September 1975 which killed two people and injured over 60 others.

== The bombing ==
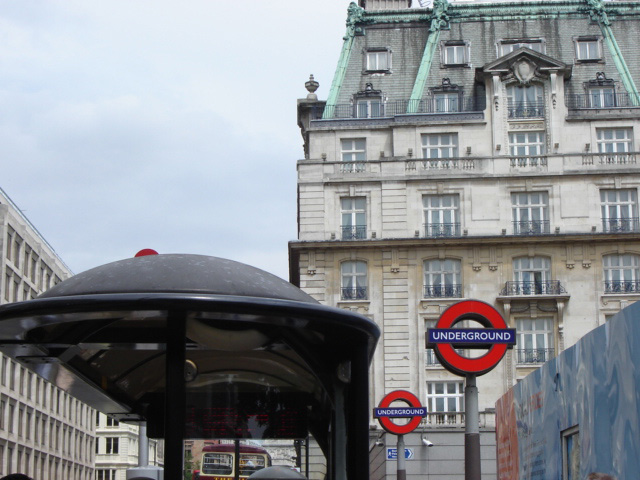
The Ritz Hotel London which was the original target opposite the Green Park station where the bomb exploded

At around 21:00 GMT on 9 October 1975, a bomb thrown at a bus stop just outside Green Park Underground station exploded, killing a homeless man (23-year-old Graham Ronald Tuck), who died of a heart attack after suffering severe head and chest injuries. 20 other people, including two children, were injured; the majority of the injuries were the result of flying glass hitting passers-by. The force of the blast threw pedestrians off their feet, shattered shop windows across the road and blew cars onto the pavement. The station had not been the original target, the bomber was constructing a bomb in the toilet of the Ritz Hotel London when he heard noises that startled him; he ran out of the hotel and threw the bomb at the station a few yards across the road and jumped into his getaway car.

The attack occurred almost exactly one year after the Guildford pub bombings in October 1974. The force of the explosion threw cutlery and glassware from the dining tables in the Ritz Hotel. Customers escaped injury because the main restaurant, which bore the brunt of the blast, had been emptied to make way for a wedding reception earlier that day.

== Aftermath ==
The IRA's bombing campaign in London would continue their campaign killing several more people and injuring dozens more in bomb and gun attacks. The worst of these was the bombing at Walton's restaurant in November which killed two people and injured over 20 others. The active service unit was caught at the siege of Balcombe Street in December 1975 ending its campaign in London.

== See also ==
- Chronology of Provisional Irish Republican Army actions (1970–79)
