= Carlton Tower and Portman Hotel shootings =

1975 IRA shootings in London, England

Carlton Tower and Portman Hotel Shootings
- Part of The Troubles
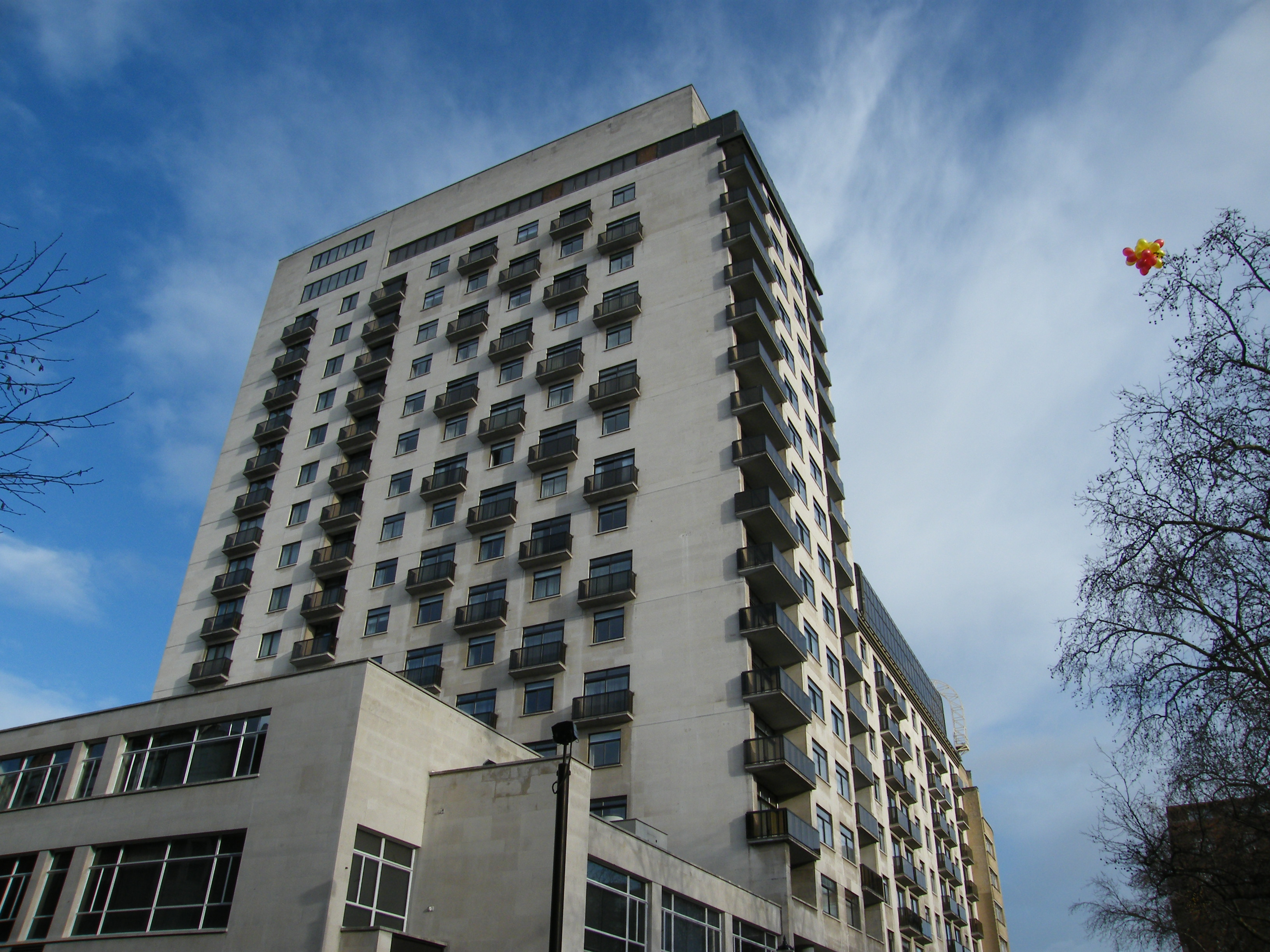
- The Jumeirah Carlton Tower, previously just the Carlton Tower hotel which the IRA fired shots at
- Location: Portman Square, London & Cadogan Place, Knightsbridge, London, England
- Date: 19 January 1975
- Attack type: shooting
- Weapons: Sten & M1 carbine
- Deaths: 0
- Injuries: 12
- Perpetrator: Provisional IRA

On 19 January 1975 the Provisional IRA's Balcombe Street Gang opened fire with automatic weapons on two hotels in London, England. Twelve people were injured by broken glass. The IRA carried out a similar attack a month before, and attacked one of the hotels again a few months after.

It was the first attack of 1975 carried out by the IRA unit, who had been responsible for the Woolwich pub bombing and Guildford pub bombings which resulted in the deaths of seven people (5 off-duty British soldiers and 2 civilians) a few months earlier.

== Incident ==
The IRA team headed by Eddie Butler drove slowly by the Portman Hotel in Portman Square and fired approximately 20 rounds of 9mm ammunition into the hotel using a Sten Submachine gun. Two hours later another IRA team drove by the Carlton Tower Hotel located along Cadogan Place, Knightsbridge and fired into it with an M1 carbine. Four people were injured in this attack, mainly from flying glass.

At first people believed the attacks might have been motivated by anti-Semitism as both hotels were owned by Jewish businessmen. But police believed it to be the work of the Provisional IRA who carried out a similar shooting attack a month earlier on the 14 December 1974 against the Churchill Hotel also in Portman Square in which three people were injured, including two American tourists and a Swedish businessman.

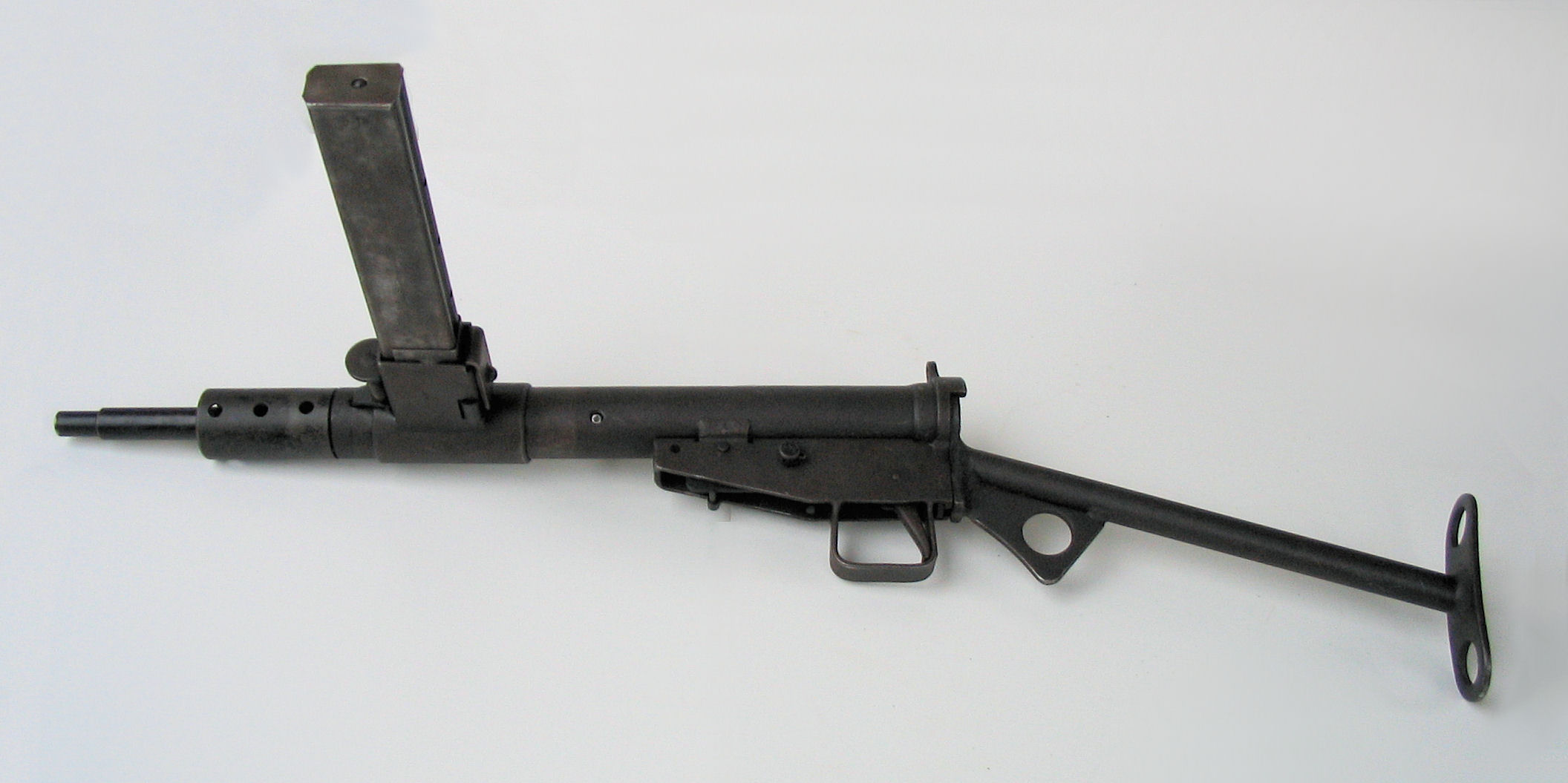
A Sten submachine gun like the one used to shoot at the Portman Hotel by the IRA, in January 1975

== Aftermath ==
The IRA continued carrying out attacks in England for the month of January 1975. On 23 January a time bomb at the Woodford Waterworks pumping station in North London exploded, causing three injuries. Then on 27 January two of seven times planted by the Balcombe Street Gang exploded in Kensington High Street and Victoria street injuring a total of six people. A bomb exploded in Manchester in which over 20 people were injured.

In September 1975 the IRA again attacked the Portman Hotel. They exploded a bomb outside the entrance injuring three people & blowing the glass out of the hotel windows.

== See also ==
- Chronology of Provisional Irish Republican Army actions (1970–79)
