= Walton's Restaurant bombing =

1975 event in the Troubles

Coordinates: 51.493696°N 0.168067°W

- Part of the Troubles
- Location: Walton Street, Chelsea, London
- Date: 18 November 1975; 21:50 (GMT)
- Target: London's West End Business'
- Attack type: Time bomb
- Deaths: 2
- Injuries: 23
- Perpetrator: Provisional IRA Balcombe Street Gang

On Tuesday evening 18 November 1975 an Irish Republican Army (IRA) unit nicknamed the Balcombe Street Gang, without warning, threw a bomb into Walton's Restaurant in Walton Street, Knightsbridge, London, killing two people and injuring almost two dozen others.

== Background ==
The IRA began a bombing campaign in England in 1973 when they exploded a car bomb outside the Old Bailey on 8 March of that year. According to the leader of the Balcombe Street unit, the first bombing they carried out was the Guildford pub bombings on 5 October 1974, which killed five people and injured over 60 others. In February 1975, the Provisional Irish Republican Army agreed to a truce. Before the truce, the IRA Active service unit (ASU), later dubbed the Balcombe Street Gang (because of the December 1975 Balcombe Street siege), had been bombing targets in England since autumn 1974, particularly in London and Surrey. In total the unit carried out around 40 bomb and gun attacks on mainland Britain between October 1974 - December 1975.

== Bombing ==
After the 1975 IRA–British Army truce began to break, the IRA's Balcombe Street ASU stepped up its bombing and shooting campaign on mainland Britain. On the night of 18 November 1975 the unit chose to bomb Walton's Restaurant, in Walton Street, Chelsea. At approximately 21:50 in the evening, an explosive device was thrown by IRA Volunteers through the window of the restaurant. Two civilians, Audrey Edgson (aged 45) and Theodore Williams (aged 49), were killed. The explosive device injured 23 other people, the oldest of them 71 years of age. The IRA used miniature ball bearings within the bomb to maximise injuries. Two persons, a man and woman, died at St. Stephen's Hospital shortly after being taken there. According to Dr. Laurence Martin, the consultant in charge of the casualty department in St. Stephen's Hospital, four of those injured required emergency operations. Martin reportedly said: "We have been involved with nine bomb incidents in the past two years but this is the worst".

Senior Scotland Yard official, James Nevin, deputy head of the bomb squad, said that the bomb used in the attack had been a "shrapnel‐like device" containing three pounds of explosives.

== Aftermath ==
This was the Balcombe Street gang's last major bomb attack during their fourteen-month bombing campaign of the British mainland. The IRA units bombing campaign would come to an end in December 1975 when they were caught at the Balcombe Street Siege which is where the unit got its name from.

== See also ==
- Chronology of Provisional Irish Republican Army actions (1970–79)
