= Roger Goad (explosives officer) =

British police officer

- Born: 5 August 1935; Jutogh, India
- Died: 29 August 1975 (aged 40); Kensington, England
- Military career
- Allegiance: United Kingdom
- Branch: British Army
- Service years: 1953–1974
- Rank: Captain
- Service number: 22966669
- Unit: Royal Army Ordnance Corps
- Conflicts: Cyprus Emergency; The Troubles
- Awards: George Cross; British Empire Medal
- Other work: Explosives Officer, Metropolitan Police Service

Roger Philip Goad, GC, BEM (5 August 1935 – 29 August 1975) was an explosives officer with London's Metropolitan Police Service who was posthumously awarded the George Cross for the heroism he displayed on 29 August 1975. He had previously been awarded the British Empire Medal in 1958 for gallantry whilst serving with the Royal Army Ordnance Corps in Cyprus, for repeated acts of deliberate courage in the disarming of bombs and booby traps set by terrorists.

== Early life ==
Goad was born in Jutogh, India. He was the son of Ronald William Goad and Daisy Bertha Goad (née Martin). Ronald Goad was a staff sergeant in the Royal Artillery.

== Army career ==
Goad enlisted in the Royal Army Ordnance Corps and worked his way up the ranks. He was a sergeant at the time he received the British Empire Medal in February 1958; and a warrant officer class 2 when he received a commission as lieutenant in February 1968. He was promoted to captain two years later, and retired from the army in August 1974. He then became an explosives officer with the Metropolitan Police.

== George Cross ==
On the night of 29 August 1975, Joseph O'Connell and Eddie Butler, members of the IRA's Balcombe Street Gang placed a bomb in the doorway of a shoe shop in Kensington Church Street in London. The Balcombe Street Gang was responsible for the 1974–1975 terror campaign in London which included the Guildford pub bombings, the London Hilton bombing & the Woolwich pub bombing among many others.

A warning about the bomb was telephoned to the Daily Mail newspaper at 9:35pm. Police officers discovered the device in the doorway of a branch of K-Shoes and the area was cordoned-off. A nearby pub was evacuated due to fears of a second bomb. Goad was the senior bomb disposal expert on the scene and he attempted to defuse the bomb but it exploded at 10:12pm, killing him instantly. It is unknown whether the bomb was detonated by its timer, or whether Goad triggered the bomb's anti-handling device. At the time, hundreds of people had gathered in the area and were being held back by the police cordon.

Goad was a 40-year-old married man with two children. His citation was published in the London Gazette of 1 October 1976. The four members of the IRA group were captured four months later at the conclusion of the Balcombe Street siege. After being convicted of a number of murders, the four were imprisoned for life, receiving a whole life tariff. They were released in 1999 as part of the Good Friday Agreement.

== See also ==
- Kenneth Howorth (Killed trying to defuse an IRA bomb in Oxford Street in October 1981)
- List of British police officers killed in the line of duty
