= Woolwich pub bombing =

Demolished pub in London, England

Kings Arms, Woolwich
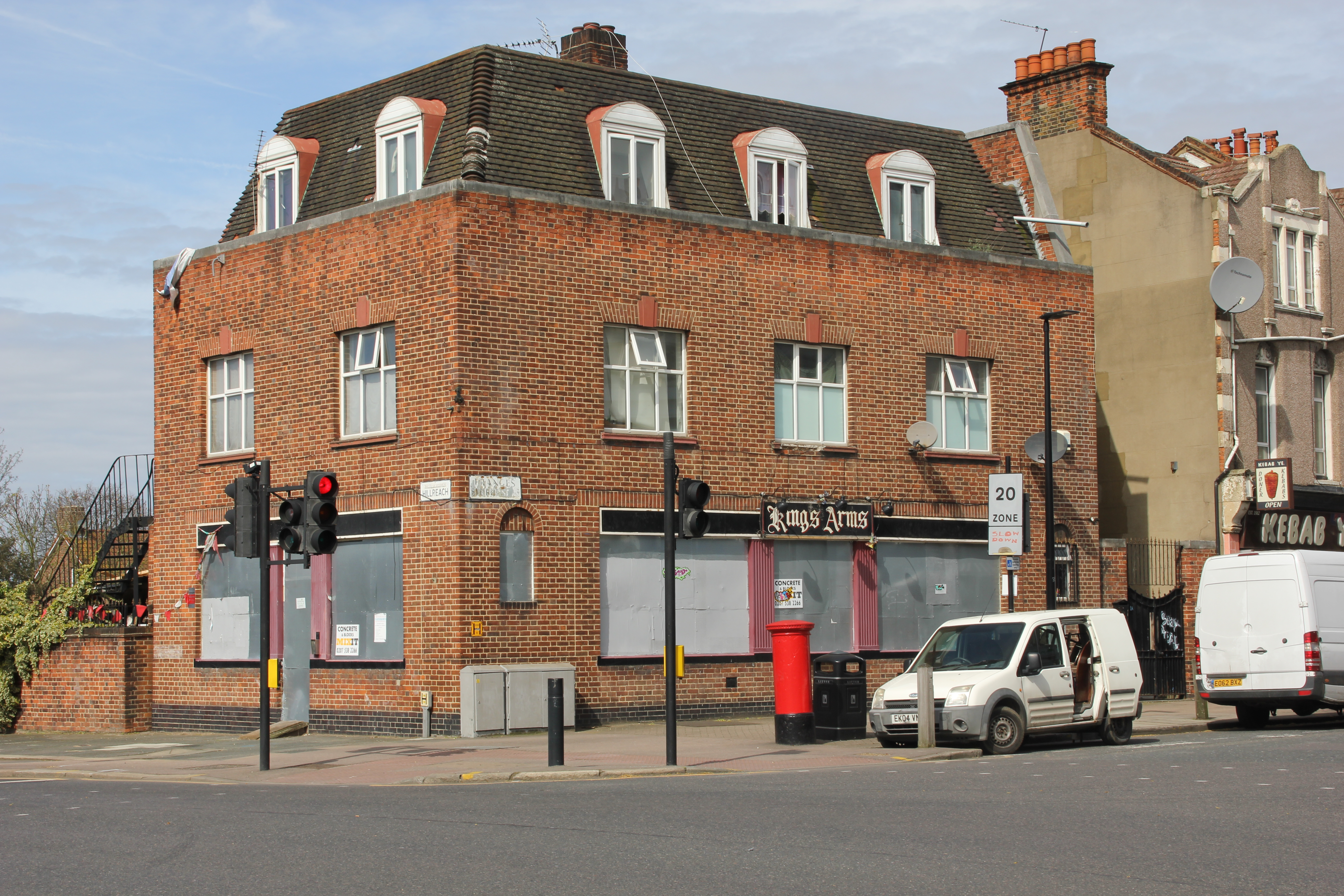
- Kings Arms (2018)

- Location within Royal Borough of Greenwich Location within Greater London

General information
- Location: Woolwich, London, England
- Coordinates: 51.4874°N 0.0561°E

The Woolwich pub bombing was an attack by the Provisional Irish Republican Army on the Kings Arms, a public house in Woolwich in southeast London, on 7 November 1974. Two people were killed in the explosion.

== Background ==
Standing at 1 Frances Street to the south of Woolwich Dockyard and the Royal Marine Barracks, and northwest of the Royal Artillery Barracks, the Kings Arms was built in the 19th century. In the 1881 census it is listed as the Kings Arms Hotel.

== Bombing ==
The pub was attacked by the Provisional Irish Republican Army on 7 November 1974, and two people were killed: Gunner Richard Dunne (aged 42), of the Royal Artillery (whose Barracks was just 100 yards away), and Alan Horsley (aged 20), a sales clerk. A further 35 people, including the landlady, Margaret Nash, were injured. Echoing similar attacks in Guildford the previous month, a bomb, made of 6 lb of gelignite plus shrapnel, had been thrown through a window into the pub.

Initially a left-wing extremist group called Red Flag 74 said it had placed the bomb, but responsibility was subsequently claimed by the Provisional Irish Republican Army (IRA) and specifically by part of the Active Service Unit apprehended in December 1975 at the Balcombe Street Siege. Two of the Guildford Four were wrongfully charged in December 1974 with involvement in the Woolwich pub bombing, and their convictions in October 1975 were eventually quashed in 1989 after a long campaign for justice.

The bombing was most likely the work of the Balcombe Street ASU, which claimed sole responsibility during the 1977 trial of four members apprehended at the siege and included Joe O'Connell, who stated from the dock:

We have instructed our lawyers to draw the attention of the court to the fact that four totally innocent people - Carole Richardson, Gerry Conlon, Paul Hill and Paddy Armstrong - are serving massive sentences for three bombings, two in Guildford and one in Woolwich, which three of us and another man now imprisoned, have admitted that we did."

The other three members apprehended at the siege were Hugh Doherty, Eddie Butler and Harry Duggan. Liam Quinn (a US-born member) and Brendan Dowd were also active within the unit. Sentenced to life imprisonment, the 'Balcombe Street four' served 23 years in English prisons until transferred to Portlaoise Prison, County Laois, Ireland, in early 1998. They were then released in 1999 under the terms of the Good Friday Agreement.

Neither the Woolwich bombing nor the wrongful imprisonments resulted in further charges or convictions. Three British police officers—Thomas Style, John Donaldson and Vernon Attwell—were charged in 1993 with conspiracy to pervert the course of justice, but each was found not guilty.

In continuation of a 'troubles' overseas offensive, the Royal Artillery Barracks in Woolwich were bombed by the IRA in December 1983.

== Redevelopment of Kings Arms ==
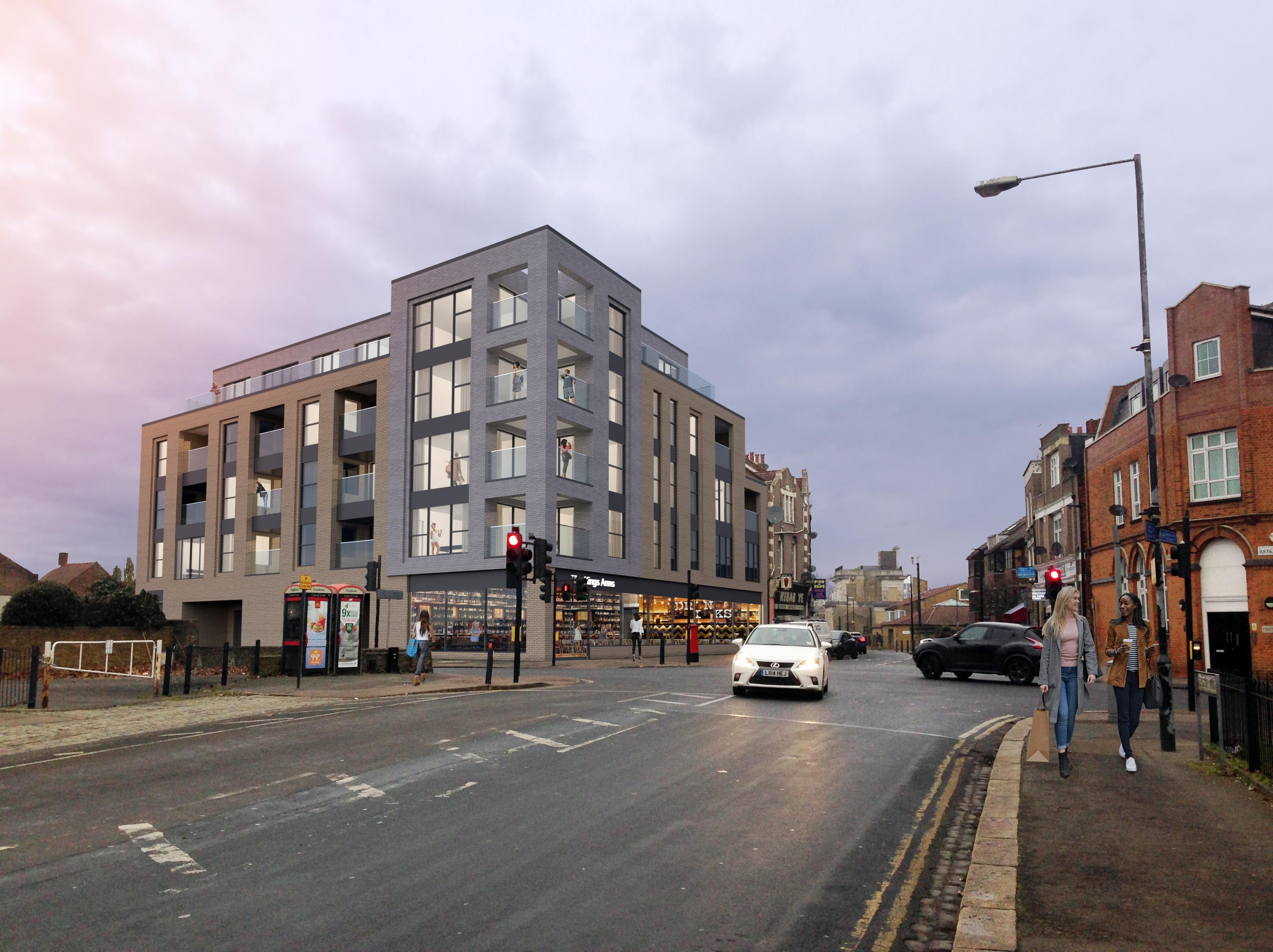
CGI of approved scheme for the Kings Arms

On 17 April 2018, P2P Residential Limited obtained full planning permission to demolish the pub and redevelop it as 19 residential units, nine parking spaces and a replacement pub across the ground floor and basement.

Similar plans had been proposed in 2013; permission was granted in 2015 for 12 residential units and a pub, but the then owner did not implement the consent. The pub was demolished for redevelopment in 2020. Following a 2022 planning application, a Tesco Express supermarket was opened on the ground floor of the building.

== See also ==
- Birmingham pub bombings
- Guildford pub bombings
