= Kensington Church Street =

Shopping street in Kensington, London

- A4204
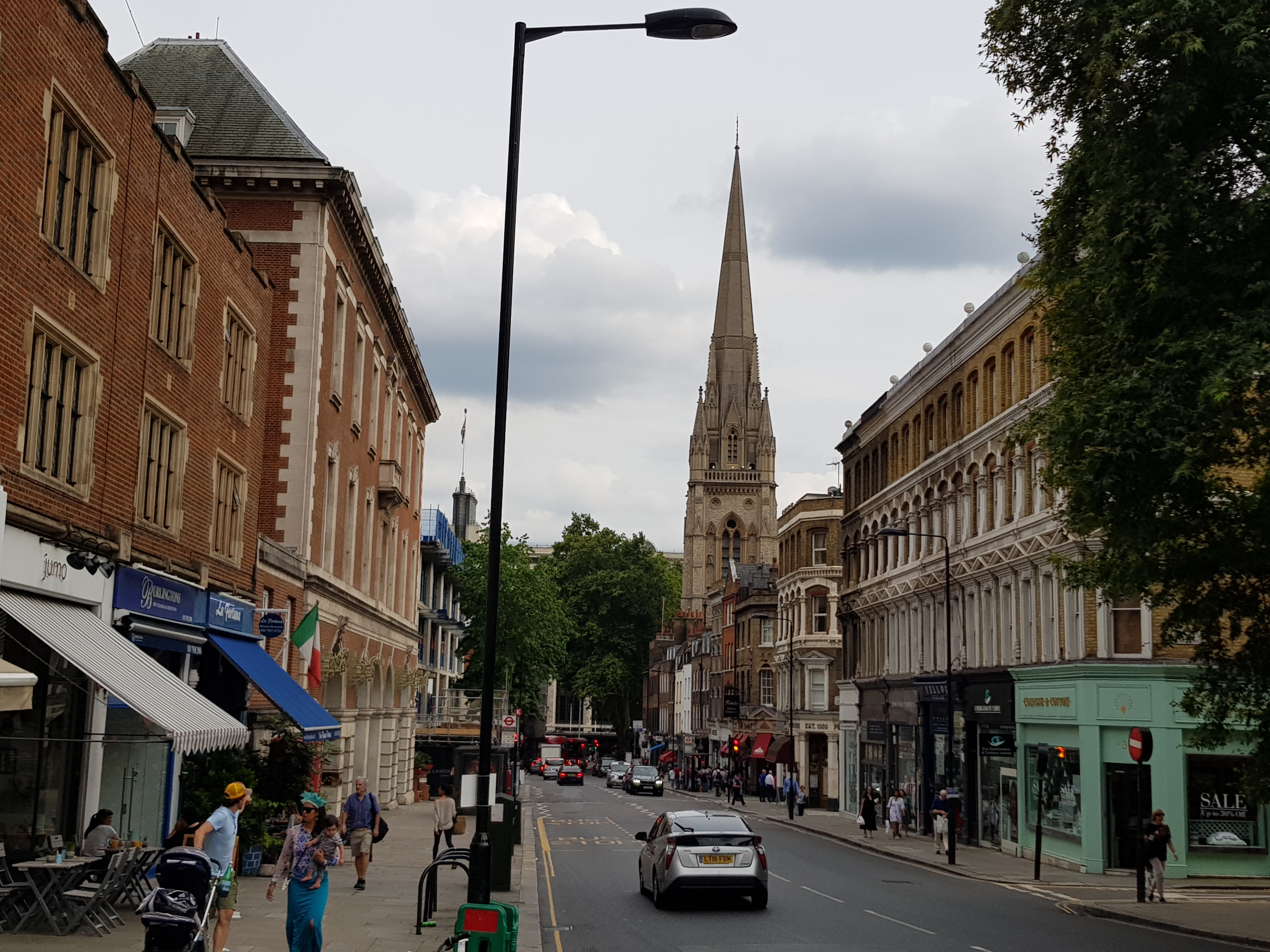
- Kensington Church Street, 2019. Looking south towards St Mary Abbots church

- Location within City of Westminster
- Former names: Church Lane, Silver Street
- Location: Kensington, London
- Postal code: W8
- Nearest Tube station: Notting Hill Gate
- Coordinates: 51°30′21.03″N 0°11′39.53″W
- North end: Notting Hill Gate
- South end: Kensington High Street

Other
- Known for: Shopping, fine art and antique sellers.

Kensington Church Street is a shopping street in Kensington, London, England, designated the A4204, and traditionally known for its art and antiques shops.

Buildings at the southern end date back to the early 1700s. It is named after Kensington's original church of St Mary Abbots. The south part was formerly called Church Lane, and the north part, Silver Street. Until 1864 there was a toll gate at Campden Street.

The street runs north to south from Notting Hill Gate to Kensington High Street. There are several Grade II listed Georgian and Victorian buildings.

Time Out calls it "eccentrically posh".

== Bombing ==
On the night of the 29 August 1975, Joseph O'Connell and Eddie Butler, members of the IRA's Balcombe Street Gang placed a bomb in the doorway of a shoe shop. A warning was phoned to the Daily Mail at 9:35pm. The bomb exploded at 10:12pm, killing Roger Goad, a Metropolitan Police explosives officer who was attempting to defuse it.

== Notable buildings, shops and residents ==
The composer Muzio Clementi lived at Number 128 from 1820 to 1823, and is commemorated with a blue plaque. The novelist and journalist Tom Stacey lived there during the 1950s.

Number 138 is a house built in 1736-1737. It was the home and studio of the artist Lucian Freud from the 1970s until his death in 2011. The building is now Grade II listed.

From 1966 to 1969, Barbara Hulanicki's influential fashion shop Biba was located at 19-21 Kensington Church Street. The antique dealer Eila Grahame had a shop on Kensington Church Street from 1969 until her death in 2009. The Rowley Gallery, a picture-frame makers, has had premises at several addresses in Kensington Church Street since 1898.

== In fiction ==
The street is mentioned several times in The Napoleon of Notting Hill by G. K. Chesterton.
