= Murder of Stephen Tibble =

1975 killing in London

Stephen Tibble
- Born: 13 August 1953
- Died: 26 February 1975 (age 21); West Kensington, London, England
- Police career
- Department: Metropolitan Police Service
- Service years: 6 months
- Rank: Police Constable
- Awards: Queen's Police Medal

PC Stephen Andrew Tibble, QPM (1953 – 26 February 1975) was a police officer in London's Metropolitan Police Service. During a chase through West Kensington, the unarmed Tibble was fatally shot by Liam Quinn, an American member of the Provisional Irish Republican Army.

== Death ==
Four unarmed plain-clothed police officers, Trainee Detective Constables Derek Wilson and Kenneth Mathews and Police Constables Adrian Blackledge and Les White in two teams, had spent the day on the lookout for burglary suspects in the Fairholme Road area of West Kensington. At one point during the course of the operation, Blackledge noticed a man behaving in a suspicious manner outside house number 39 on Fairholme Road; when he spotted the same individual thirty minutes later he decided to question him. Blackledge approached the suspect and introduced himself as a police officer and requested that the man empty out his pockets. The suspect was Liam Quinn, a US citizen from an Irish Republican family in San Francisco who had immersed himself in all things Irish, including affecting an Irish accent. A Provisional IRA volunteer, he had replaced Brendan Dowd as a member of the IRA's active service unit operating in London at the time.

Blackledge noticed that Quinn was carrying a lot of Irish money on him, and so told Quinn he wanted to escort him back to the address he had been seen leaving in Fairholme Road to see what he had been up to. Quinn then attempted to flee, running west down Charleville Road, pursued by Blackledge, heading toward where Wilson and Matthews were sitting on a bench. The pair joined the chase and Wilson later stated that he heard the sound of a motorbike approaching from behind. The rider was 21-year-old off-duty PC Stephen Tibble, who was married and had been a serving officer for six months.

Initially flagged down by Wilson, Tibble gave chase on his motorbike, riding past the pursuing officers and the running Quinn, and pulled to a stop at the junction of Charleville Road and Gledstanes Road. Tibble dismounted from his motorbike, crouched and spread out his arms to block the path of the suspect and catch hold of him. At that point, Quinn pulled a gun out and shot Tibble twice in the chest at point-blank range with a .38 Long Colt revolver.

Tibble died three hours later in hospital. It is often erroneously believed that Quinn fled into the tunnel at Barons Court tube station, but in fact he had been pursued by Wilson on Tibble's motorbike and evaded capture by running through the ground floor of a tower block off Talgarth Road.

== Bomb factory ==
The police discovered that the flat in Fairholme Road that Quinn had been seen entering was a bomb factory. The basement was found to contain enough bomb-making equipment to make half a dozen high-explosive bombs. Also found were an automatic pistol and ammunition as well as English and Irish money, wigs and a letter addressed to Joe O'Connell, another IRA volunteer. The landlord stated to police that a "Michael Wilson" occupied the flat.

The discovery of the factory led police to identify four other suspects, who later became known as the Balcombe Street gang after they held a couple hostage in the Balcombe Street Siege in Marylebone. The London-based IRA active service unit had been responsible for a series of bombings and killings in England. This included the inadvertent car-bomb killing of Gordon Hamilton-Fairley, a cancer specialist who was not the target, and the assassination of Ross McWhirter, a conservative political activist and a co-founder of the Guinness Book of Records; he was shot on his doorstep by the unit after he offered a reward for their capture.

== Aftermath ==
Quinn escaped to Dublin where he was later arrested for assaulting a police officer. One of the plain-clothed officers who encountered him in the London incident identified him, but extradition from the Republic of Ireland to the United Kingdom was refused by the Irish courts. After serving a prison sentence in Ireland for IRA membership, Quinn, a US citizen of Irish and Mexican descent, returned to San Francisco shortly after his release.

Quinn was arrested in California by the Federal Bureau of Investigation in 1981 after the US government approved an extradition request from British authorities. He then instigated a seven-year battle against extradition to the UK. Quinn was extradited to England in 1988 and was tried and found guilty of murder. He was sentenced to life imprisonment in February 1988 with a recommended minimum sentence of thirty years. Quinn served eleven years in Portaloise prison before he was released in April 1999, along with the rest of the Balcombe Street gang, under the terms of the Good Friday Agreement.

Sympathetic members of the public donated money to Tibble's widow. He was posthumously awarded the Queen's Police Medal for gallantry (the last award of that medal to a British police officer for gallantry rather than distinguished service) and a memorial was erected at the spot where he was killed on Charleville Road in Barons Court.

== See also ==
- List of British police officers killed in the line of duty
