= Harry Duggan =

Harry Duggan may refer to:

- Harry Duggan (footballer)
- Harry Duggan (Irish republican)
