= Walton Street =

Walton Street may refer to:

- Walton Street, Oxford
- Walton Street, London
