= Harry Duggan (Irish republican) =

Irish republican soldier

Harry Duggan is a former member of the Provisional Irish Republican Army (IRA) and a representative of Sinn Féin in County Clare. He was part of an IRA unit based in England, of which Duggan and three others were labelled the "Balcombe Street Gang" by news media after a five-day siege in the eponymous London Street. He and his co-accused were imprisoned for seven murders along with other charges.

== Biography ==
Duggan was born in 1952 in Kilburn, London to parents from Feakle, County Clare. He had three siblings. His family returned to County Clare when he was three years old. He trained as a carpenter at a local factory, having left school aged fourteen. In the late sixties, at the onset of The Troubles in Northern Ireland, he became involved with Sinn Féin. Later, his family was told he'd been "killed in action." Gardai said his son had been buried secretly which led to his father searching a graveyard in Scarriff for his remains.

On 6 December 1975, officers working for the Metropolitan Police chased Duggan, Edward Butler, Martin Joseph O'Connell and Hugh Doherty by car through London after detectives deployed as part of Operation Comb – a reaction to the IRA's recent attacks – had witnessed the group firing an automatic weapon from their car into Scott's restaurant in Mayfair. They became trapped in a cul-de-sac, barged into 22B Balcombe Street and took couple Sheila and John Matthews hostage in the living room of their first-floor flat. After family appeals and days of negotiations, the four gave themselves up, releasing the Matthews separately between their own surrender. During the siege, Duggan's identity was confirmed by fingerprints taken in Ireland. His father, Harry Duggan senior, said that he'd heard nothing from his son for the two years prior, adding that he'd been a quiet boy who'd never given the family any trouble.

It was claimed that the unit's members received SAS-style training, producing a secretive, tightly knit group, largely unknown to the Republican community. Duggan and the others were convicted of the murders of Ross McWhirter – killed by gunshot – and Roger Goad, Gordon Hamilton Fairley, Robert Anthony Lloyd, Graham Ronald Tuck, Audrey Edgson and John Francis Bately – all killed by bombs. On 10 February 1977, trial judge Joseph Cantley sentenced the four to 47 life terms, with a recommendation of 30-year terms of imprisonment. After the trial, the Press Association called the unit "the most violent, ruthless and highly-trained" to date sent to Great Britain.

Duggan was transferred from England to Portlaoise Prison in May 1998, appearing briefly along with his co-convicted at Sinn Féin's Ard fheis a week later, before being returned to prison. He was released the following April, aged 47, under the terms of the Good Friday Agreement. He returned to Feakle and became the county chair and spokesperson for Sinn Féin.
