= Attack on Cloghoge checkpoint =

1992 IRA bombing in Northern Ireland

Attack on the Cloghoge checkpoint
- Part of the Troubles and Operation Banner
- Entrance to a British Army checkpoint near Newry, late 1980s
Date	1 May 1992
Location	North of Cloughoge (near Newry), County Armagh, Northern Ireland 54°9′0″N 6°20′39.90″W
Result	IRA victory: British checkpoint complex destroyed

Belligerents
Provisional IRA	(United Kingdom) British Army

Commanders and leaders
Unknown	Lt. Andrew Rawding

Strength
2 active service units 1 railway bomb	24 soldiers in complex 2 patrols

Casualties and losses
None	1 killed 23 wounded
- Location within Northern Ireland

The attack on Cloghoge checkpoint was an unconventional railway bomb attack carried out on 1 May 1992 by the Provisional Irish Republican Army (IRA) against a British Army permanent vehicle checkpoint, manned at the time by members of the Royal Regiment of Fusiliers. The IRA's South Armagh Brigade fitted a van with train wheels that allowed it to move along a railway line. A large bomb was placed inside the van, which was then driven along the railway line to the target. The explosion killed one British soldier and injured 23 others. The complex, just north of the village of Cloghoge in County Armagh, on the southern outskirts of Newry, was utterly destroyed.

== The attack ==
During the late hours of 30 April, a group of four Provisional IRA members held a family hostage in Killeen, County Armagh, and stole a mechanical excavator. This was to be used to build a makeshift ramp up to the Dublin–Belfast railway line, which drew parallel to the Dublin–Belfast motorway (M1). At the same time, other IRA members stole a dark-painted Renault Master van in Dundalk, County Louth, which was then loaded with 2,200 lb (1,000 kg) of home-made explosives. The van was fitted with a bogie with a special wheelset that could run on the rail tracks. The excavator moved up the ramp and lifted the van onto the railway. The heavy machine was also used to build a ramp with stones and wooden planks to align the van bomb with the railway. The van was then driven some 800 metres north and a mile-long wire attached to a triggering device was added to the bomb. Meanwhile, other IRA members in a support role set up roadblocks on both sides of the border to keep people away from their target. The IRA unit who set up the checkpoint in the Republic wore Garda Síochána uniforms.

At about 2:00 AM, the van was clamped into first gear and directed at the Romeo-One-Five (R15) military checkpoint, a permanent vehicle checkpoint on M1 motorway, alongside the railway. The South Armagh Brigade had examined the compound and realised that the railway side of the fortified position was lacking blast wall protection.

A British Army patrol from the 2nd Battalion Royal Regiment of Fusiliers 300 yards (270 m) south of the outpost heard what sounded like a train approaching the checkpoint. The first tip that something was wrong was when a passer-by told another patrol, led by Lieutenant 'Zippy' Allanach, that his vehicle had been diverted by hooded men at one of the IRA checkpoints. Another soldier looking through a telescope from R14, a watchtower on top of Cloghoge mountain, spotted the van on the rails heading towards the checkpoint, which was alerted by radio immediately. The sentry at R15, Fusilier Andrew Grundy, spotted the incoming threat and alerted the other soldiers in the checkpoint, who rushed to take shelter from the bomb. Grundy tried to disable the improvised locomotive with gunfire, to no avail.

Meanwhile, an IRA member, from the high ground south of the position, waited for the van to reach its target, guided by the vehicle's courtesy lights. An IRA statement claims that a braking device was then used to stop the van when it passed abreast of the complex. The IRA volunteer then radioed the men at the end of the wire to trigger the bomb. At 2:05, the explosive went off, demolishing the checkpoint. The 10-ton sangar was lifted off of its foundation and thrown 12 yards away. Fusilier Grundy was killed almost instantly, but the rest of the soldiers, all inside a reinforced concrete bunker, survived the massive blast. A total 23 troops received injuries of different severity.

== Aftermath ==
Fusilier G. A. Colman was awarded a General Officer Commanding commendation for his role in rescuing the body of Fusilier Grundy and the wounded soldiers.

The British Army's official report about this incident stated: "This was a well-planned and well-executed attack indicative of the imaginative, innovative and capable nature of South Armagh PIRA".

Former British Army Brigadier Peter Morton put in question the wisdom of these fixed military compounds along the border by comparing the bases with "Crusader castles showing the flag on every Ulster road and hillside, (they) are sitting targets for the terrorists, to be reconnoitred in safety and attacked at leisure. They drain resources, sap the strength of the security forces, and place many lives needlessly in danger."

The checkpoint was never re-opened. Another smaller PVCP was built a few miles to the west. During the construction of the new outpost, there was an IRA rocket attack on a lorries' convoy carrying materials to the site on 30 July 1992. A sustained mortar attack was also carried out by the Provisionals on 6 August. This new checkpoint cost £7 million, only to be removed in 1998 right after the Good Friday Agreement.

== See also ==
- Chronology of Provisional Irish Republican Army actions (1992–1999)
- Improvised tactical vehicles of the Provisional IRA
- Attack on Derryard checkpoint
- Glenanne barracks bombing
- Drummuckavall Ambush
- Proxy bomb
