= 1975 LaGuardia Airport bombing =

Terrorist attack in New York City

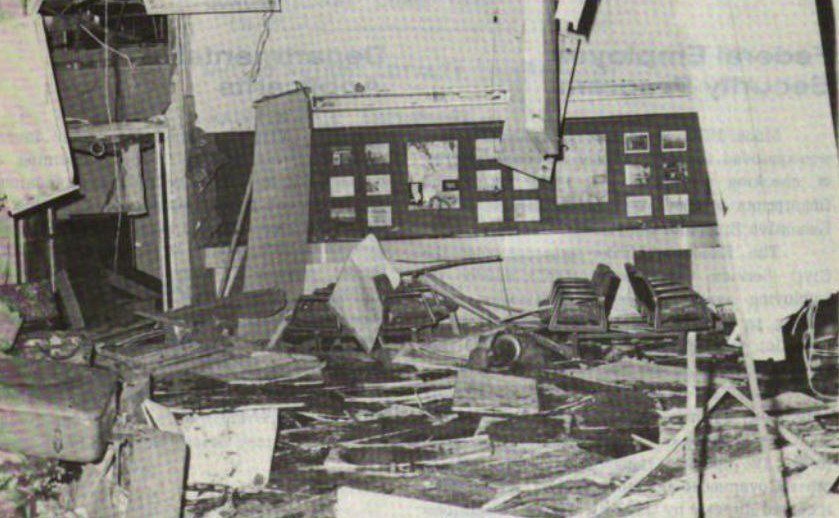
- Damage to the Trans World Airlines terminal
- Location: 40°46′28″N 73°52′17″W; Queens, New York City, US
- Date: December 29, 1975; 6:33 p.m. (local time)
- Target: LaGuardia Airport
- Attack type: Bombing, mass murder
- Deaths: 11
- Injuries: 74
- Perpetrator: Unknown
- Motive: Unknown

On December 29, 1975, a bomb detonated near the Trans World Airlines (TWA) baggage reclaim terminal at LaGuardia Airport in New York City, United States, killing 11 people and seriously injuring 74 others. Investigators theorized that it might have been committed by anti-Yugoslavia Croatians or agents of the Yugoslavian government intending to discredit the opposition, but the crime remains unsolved. The attack occurred during a four-year period of heightened terrorism within the United States, and 1975 was especially volatile, with bombings in New York City and Washington, D.C. and two assassination attempts on President Gerald Ford.

The LaGuardia Airport bombing was, at the time, the deadliest attack by a non-state actor to occur on American soil since the 1927 Bath School disaster, which killed 45 people (including the perpetrator). It was the deadliest attack in New York City since the 1920 Wall Street bombing, which killed 38 people, until the September 11 attacks in 2001, which killed 2,977.

== Attack ==
The bomb exploded at approximately 6:33 p.m. in the TWA baggage claim area in the central terminal. Investigators believed that the equivalent of 25 sticks of dynamite had been placed in a coin-operated locker located next to the baggage carousels. The bomb blew the lockers apart, sending fragments flying across the room. The fragmentation caused all 11 deaths and injured several people. Others were injured by shards of glass broken from the terminal's plate-glass windows. The force of the bomb ripped a 10-by-15-foot (3.0 by 4.6 m) hole in the 8-inch (20 cm) reinforced concrete ceiling of the baggage claim area.

The death toll could have been much worse if the area had not been largely clear of passengers at the time; two flights from Cincinnati and Indianapolis had arrived at 6:00 p.m. and most of the passengers on these flights had already left the area. Most of the dead and injured were airport employees, people waiting for transportation, and limo drivers. The deceased victims ranged in ages 25 to 72.

I walked into the [airport] terminal maybe 15 feet. It was black and full of smoke ... A girl, a young lady in her 20s, popped out of the smoke. I said something like, "You'll be all right" and carried her out. Her coat was smoking and she was blackened.

— Mike Schimmel, a businessman who had been in a limo outside the terminal when the bomb detonated and entered the terminal shortly afterward.

== Aftermath ==
One witness, 27-year-old Indianapolis lawyer H. Patrick Callahan, was with his law partner at the time of the bombing. He said:

My law partner and I had gone outside to see where the limo was ... We had just gone back and we were leaning against one of those big columns. The people who died were standing next to us," said Callahan. When Callahan awakened, all he could see was dust, and he could not even see his companion, who was two feet away at the time. The blast damaged Callahan's hearing, which did not return for a week. "The bomb appeared to have been placed in the lockers directly adjacent to the carousel that the luggage was on ... It was evil.

The bombing was condemned by Pope Paul VI and President Ford, who expressed that he was "deeply grieved at the loss of life and injuries". He stopped his vacation in Vail, Colorado and ordered FAA head John McLucas to investigate ways of tightening airport security. New York City mayor Abraham Beame said that the bombing "was the work of maniacs. We will hunt them down."

== Investigations ==
The NYPD's Queens chief of detectives Edwin Dreher led the investigation. He was less than 2 miles (3 km) from LaGuardia investigating a drug-related murder in the Astoria neighborhood when he heard about the bombing. He immediately went to the airport and summoned by radio all available detectives from the five boroughs, launching what was at the time the largest criminal investigation in the NYPD's history. The investigation included 120 NYPD detectives, 600 FBI agents, ATF agents and Port Authority investigators. They concluded that the bomb was composed of either TNT or plastic explosives and was controlled by household items such as a Westclox alarm clock and an Eveready six-volt lantern battery. One of the leads suggested was a paroled political activist who had been imprisoned for a previous bombing. The activist's brother had been arrested at LaGuardia on a fraud charge the day before the bombing. When subsequent investigations showed that the activist had an alibi, he was eliminated as a suspect.

The investigation may have been hampered by the cleanup operation, in which victims and debris were removed from the scene.

Following the attack, telephone calls were made to several American airports, such as those in Washington, Cleveland and St. Louis, warning of further attacks, but these were hoaxes. An anonymous caller phoned the news agency UPI claiming to represent the Palestine Liberation Organization (PLO) and assuming responsibility for the attack. However, the PLO spokesman at the United Nations denied all responsibility and condemned "the dastardly attack against the innocent people at LaGuardia". The PLO believed that the phone call linking it to the bombing was an attempt to sabotage talks at the UN scheduled for January 12 regarding the plight of Palestinians.

Other suggested perpetrators included the Mafia, the FALN (who were responsible for the bombing of New York's Fraunces Tavern in January 1975), and the Jewish Defense League, although no evidence was found to link these groups to the bombing other than their past violence. Many note similarities between the LaGuardia bombing and the plane hijacking and bombing of the same airport the following year by Croatian terrorist group Otpor, whose leader confessed guilt for the LaGuardia attack but later recanted, claiming that he had confessed under the effects of sleep deprivation. Convicted Croatian hijacker Zvonko Bušić was considered a person of interest. Although he spent more than 30 years in prison for another bombing, he was never charged in the airport bombing.

As there was no credible claim of responsibility, investigators concluded that the bomb had exploded at the wrong time and that the intent had been that it should detonate either 12 hours earlier or later, when the area would have been nearly clear of people. John Schindler, writing for The New York Observer, suggested that the Yugoslav State Security Administration (UDBA or UDSA) orchestrated the bombing as a false-flag attack as part of an ongoing effort to discredit Croatian dissidents.

The Air Transport Association offered a $50,000 reward for information leading to the arrest of the bombers. The crime remains officially unsolved. With no developments in the investigation, the bombing has been largely forgotten; there is no memorial for the victims.

== See also ==
- Crime in New York City
- Domestic terrorism in the United States
- List of terrorist incidents in 1975
- List of unsolved murders (1900–1979)
