= Walton Street, London =

Street in London, England

Coordinates: 51.495564°N 0.165711°W

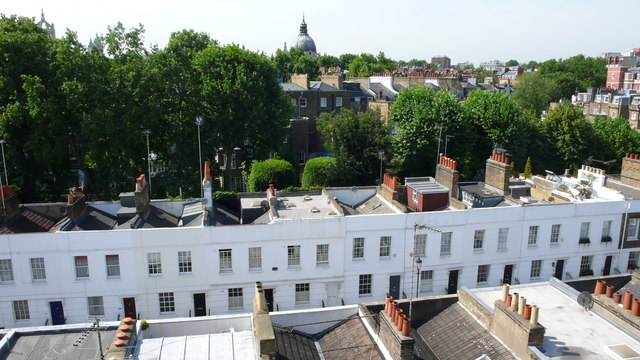
Walton Street, London SW3 in 2007

Walton Street is a street within west London's Chelsea district, bordering Knightsbridge. It runs south-west to north-east from Draycott Avenue to Walton Place, parallel to Brompton Road to the north.

It is known for its boutiques and restaurants.

On 18 November 1975, the Walton's Restaurant bombing took place, when an Irish Republican Army (IRA) unit nicknamed the Balcombe Street Gang threw a bomb into Walton's Restaurant without warning, killing two people and injuring almost two dozen.

== Notable residents ==
- Jahangir Hajiyev and Zamira Hajiyeva, Azerbaijani banker and fraudster, and his wife
- Edwin La Dell (1914–1970), artist
- Berthold Wolpe (1905–1989), printer, at No. 102
