= Eila Grahame =

English antiques dealer (1935–2009)

- Grahame as a debutante
- Born: 2 October 1935; London, England
- Died: 25 November 2009 (aged 74)
- Occupation: antiques dealer

Eila Grahame-Wigan, known as Eila Grahame (2 October 1935 – 25 November 2009) was an English antiques dealer known for her sure eye and judgement.

== Biography ==
Grahame was born Eila Grahame-Wigan on 2 October 1935 in London, England. Her father was Lewis Gretton Grahame of Claverhouse, Dundee, and her mother was Eira Grey Wigan. She could trace her family tree on her father's line back to Robert III, King of Scotland in 1466.

During World War II, Grahame's mother was killed by a bomb and she was sent to live with an aunt in Loudham. She was educated first at home, then at Downe House before coming out as a debutante.

Grahame established her antiques shop on Church Street in Kensington, London, in 1969, and specialised in English glass. Among her customers were Lucian Freud.

She died on 25 November 2009, aged 74.

== Legacy ==
Grahame's personal effects were sold at auction by Cheffins in December 2016 with the proceeds going to the Art Fund and the church of St Mary of the Assumption at Ufford, where she is buried. The sale reached a total value of £577,000.

A bequest of 136 glass objects from Grahame's collection was given to the collection of Dudley Museums Service, and was permanently loaned to the new White House Cone Museum of Glass from 2018. The objects include important examples of 18th-century British glass.

In August 2017, it was reported that previously unknown sketches by Alberto Giacometti were found buried under piles of dust-covered antiques in Grahame's shop in Kensington Church Street.
