= Hugh Doherty (Irish republican) =

Irish republican

Hugh Aodh Doherty
- Born: 1950 (age 75–76); Gorbals District, Glasgow, Scotland
- Occupation: Artist
- Known for: Balcombe Street Siege
- Parents: Dan Doherty (father); Madge Doherty (mother)
- Relatives: Pat Doherty (brother)
- Status: Released under terms of the Good Friday Agreement
- Criminal charges: 11 x Murder + 7 charges
- Penalty: 11 terms of life imprisonment (30 years judicial recommendation)

Details
- Date: 6 to 12 December 1975
- Country: England, United Kingdom
- State: London
- Locations: HM Prison Wandsworth; HM Prison Leicester; HM Prison Belmarsh; Portlaoise Prison

Hugh Aodh Doherty is a Scottish-born Irish republican. A former volunteer in the Provisional Irish Republican Army (IRA), he is known for his role in the Balcombe Street Siege in London in December 1975.

== IRA activity ==
Doherty is known for his role in the Balcombe Street Siege of December 1975, at the resolution of which he was sentenced to eleven terms of life imprisonment for offences including murder, with a judicial recommendation he serve at least 30 years.

Doherty and fellow members of his active service unit had targeted tourist attractions, soldiers, police officers, politicians and other establishment figures as part of the IRA's armed campaign against Northern Ireland being a part of the United Kingdom.

The Balcombe Street gang, who were named after the London street on which they were arrested after a six-day siege that was broadcast live on television and watched by millions, were responsible for a 14-month campaign of bombings and shootings across the south-east of England.

Doherty is also known for the murder, together with Harry Duggan, of Ross McWhirter on 27 November 1975 at 6:45 p.m. Ross McWhirter (12 August 1925 – 27 November 1975) was, with his twin brother, Norris McWhirter, the cofounder of the 1955 Guinness Book of Records (known since 2000 as Guinness World Records) and a contributor to the television programme Record Breakers.

== Trial ==
At his trial at the Old Bailey in 1977, Doherty received eleven life sentences and seven other sentences ranging from eighteen to twenty-one years' imprisonment. In 1987, Jeremy Corbyn handed a petition to then-prime minister Margaret Thatcher which demanded better visiting conditions for Doherty and his fellow IRA prisoner Nat Vella, along with "the immediate transfer of Irish political prisoners to prisons near their homes". In May 1998, he was transferred from England to Portlaoise Prison in County Laois in Ireland.

Following his transfer, Doherty made an appearance at the 1998 Sinn Féin Ard Fheis at which the party accepted the Good Friday Agreement. Under these terms, Doherty was released from prison, on 9 April 1999.

== Personal details ==
Doherty was born in the Gorbals Region in Glasgow, Scotland in 1950, He has been painting since 1982. He started with landscapes and seascapes and now works as a professional artist in Ireland. He is the brother of Sinn Féin MP and MLA Pat Doherty.
