= Balcombe Street siege =

1975 hostage incident in London, England

Coordinates: 51°31′23″N 0°09′44″W

- Part of The Troubles
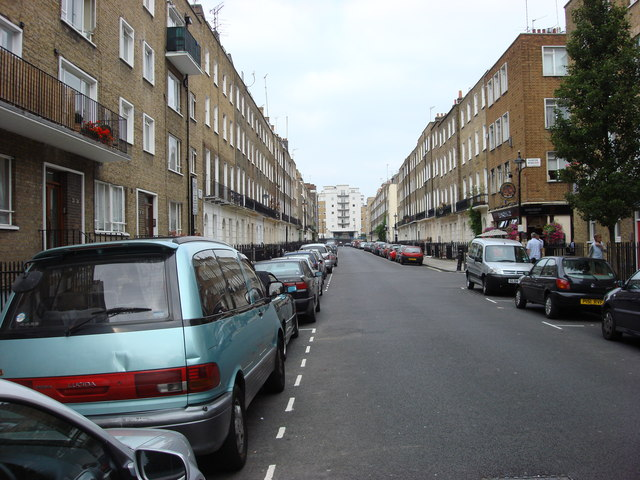
- Modern view of Balcombe Street, Marylebone. No. 22b, the building involved in the siege, is to the left.
Date	6 to 12 December 1975
Location	London, England
Result	IRA members surrendered with the hostages rescued

Belligerents
Metropolitan Police	Provisional Irish Republican Army

The Balcombe Street siege involved members of the Provisional Irish Republican Army (IRA) and London's Metropolitan Police, and lasted from 6 to 12 December 1975. The siege ended with the surrender of the four IRA members and the release of their two hostages. The events were televised and watched by millions.

== Background ==
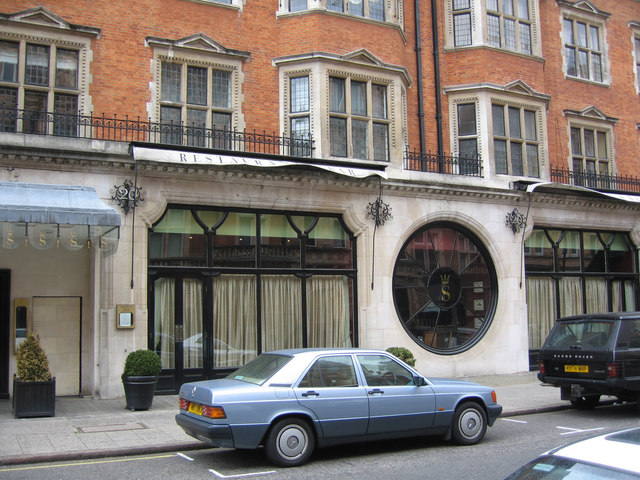
Scott's restaurant in 2005, the second attack on which preceded the siege.

In 1974 and 1975, London was subjected to an intense 14-month campaign of gun and bomb attacks by the Provisional IRA. In one incident the Guinness Book of Records co-founder and conservative political activist Ross McWhirter was assassinated; he had offered a £50,000 reward to anyone willing to inform the security forces of IRA activity.

The four members of what became known as the "Balcombe Street gang", Joe O'Connell, Edward Butler, Harry Duggan and Hugh Doherty, were part of a six-man IRA Active Service Unit (ASU) that also included Brendan Dowd and Liam Quinn. Quinn had recently shot dead police constable Stephen Tibble in London after fleeing from police officers. The flat he was seen fleeing from was discovered to be a bomb factory used by the unit.

The Balcombe Street siege started after a chase through London, as the Metropolitan Police pursued Doherty, O'Connell, Butler and Duggan through the streets after they had fired gunshots through the window of Scott's restaurant in Mount Street, Mayfair. They had thrown a bomb through the restaurant window a few weeks before on 12 November 1975, killing John Batey and injuring 15 others. The Met's Bomb Squad had detected a pattern of behaviour in the ASU, determining that they had a habit of attacking again some of the sites they had previously attacked, and that they did not carry out attacks on the weekend or on days that it rained. In a scheme devised by a young detective sergeant, the Met flooded the streets of London with plainclothes officers on the lookout for the ASU, in what was known as Operation Combo. The four IRA men were spotted as they slowed to a halt outside Scott's and fired from their stolen car.

Inspector John Purnell and Sergeant Phil McVeigh, on duty as part of the dragnet operation, picked up the radio call from the team in Mount Street as the stolen Ford Cortina approached their position. With no means of transport readily available, the two unarmed officers flagged down a taxi cab and tailed the men for several miles through London, until the IRA men abandoned their vehicle. Purnell and McVeigh, unarmed, continued the pursuit on foot despite handgun fire from the group. Other officers joined the chase, with the four IRA men running into a block of council flats in Balcombe Street, adjacent to Marylebone station, triggering the six-day standoff. Purnell was awarded the George Medal; several other police officers were also decorated.

== The siege ==
The four men went to 22b Balcombe Street in Marylebone, taking its two residents, middle-aged married couple John and Sheila Matthews, hostage in their front room. The men declared that they were members of the IRA and demanded a plane to fly both them and their hostages to Ireland. Scotland Yard refused, creating a six-day standoff between the men and the police. Peter Imbert, later Commissioner of the Metropolitan Police, was the chief police negotiator. Max Vernon, who was later chief negotiator of the Iranian Embassy siege, was another of the police negotiators.

The men surrendered after several days of intense negotiations between Metropolitan Police Bomb Squad officers, Detective Superintendent Peter Imbert and Detective Chief Superintendent Jim Nevill, and the unit's leader Joe O'Connell, who went by the name of "Tom". The other members of the gang were named "Mick" and "Paddy", thereby avoiding revealing to the negotiators precisely how many of them were in the living room of the flat. The resolution of the siege was a result of the combined psychological pressure exerted on the gang by Imbert and the deprivation tactics used on the four men. The officers also used carefully crafted misinformation, through the BBC Radio news—the police knew the gang had a radio—to further destabilise the gang into surrender. A news broadcast stated that the Special Air Service were going to be sent in to storm the building and release the hostages. This seemed to deter the gang and they eventually gave themselves up to the police.

== Trial ==
The four were found guilty at their Old Bailey trial in 1977 of seven murders, conspiring to cause explosions, and falsely imprisoning John and Sheila Matthews during the siege. O'Connell, Butler and Duggan each received 12 life sentences, and Doherty received 11. Each of the men was later given a whole life tariff, the only IRA prisoners to receive this tariff. During the trial they instructed their lawyers to "draw attention to the fact that four totally innocent people were serving massive sentences" for Guildford pub bombings and (for two of them) a Woolwich pub bombing. Despite telling the police that they (The Balcombe ASU) were responsible, they were never charged with these offences and the Guildford Four and Maguire Seven remained in prison for 15 more years, until it was ruled that their convictions were unsafe.

== Release ==
After serving 23 years in English prisons, the four men were transferred to Portlaoise Prison, County Laois, Ireland, in early 1998. They were presented by Gerry Adams to the 1998 Sinn Féin Ard Fheis as 'our Nelson Mandelas', and were released in 1999 as part of the Good Friday Agreement.

== See also ==
- Roger Philip Goad
- Gordon Hamilton-Fairley
- List of hostage crises
- List of terrorist incidents in London
