= Cloughoge, County Armagh =

Village in County Armagh, Northern Ireland

Coordinates: 54.14122°N 6.35687°W

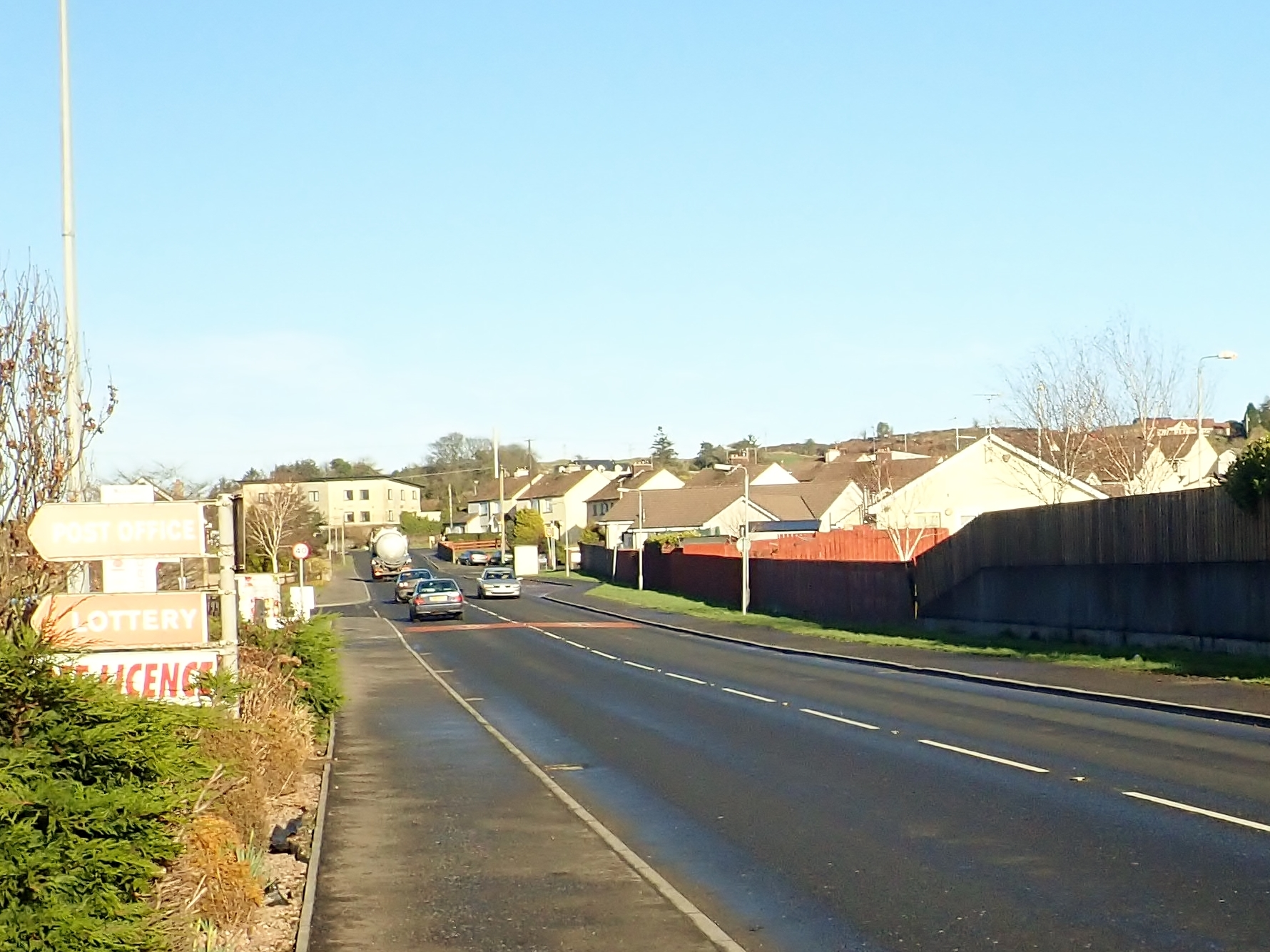
Entering the village of Cloughoge from the southwest along Forkhill road

Cloughoge is a small village outside Newry in County Armagh, Northern Ireland. In the 2021 census, the village had a population of approximately 400.

== See also ==
- List of villages in Northern Ireland
