= Joe O'Connell (Irish republican) =

Irish republican

Volunteer Joe O'Connell

Personal details
- Born: Martin Joseph O'Connell; 1951 (age 74–75) Kilkee, Ireland
- Party: Sinn Féin
- Organisation: Provisional IRA
- Arrested: December 1975
- Sentenced: 12 life sentences
- Released: 1999 under the terms of the Belfast Agreement

Martin Joseph O'Connell (born 1951), better known as Joe, is an Irish republican and a former volunteer in the Provisional Irish Republican Army (IRA). He is most noted for having been a member of the Balcombe Street gang.

== Early life and IRA career ==
O'Connell was born in Kilkee, in rural County Clare, 'a stronghold of Gaelic-speaking inhabitants and old-guard IRA sympathisers', to a farming family. He was scholastically gifted, doing well at Querrin National School, and eventually went to work for Marconi in Cork as a radio operator and electronics trainee; this experience and training in electronics made him a skilled bomb-maker when recruited in 1973 by Brian Keenan. Keenan was then IRA Quartermaster General and in charge of the England Department, responsible for the latest campaign in Britain, and specifically London. O'Connell lived for a time in Lower Market Street in Ennis, sharing a flat with a future member of the same Active Service Unit (ASU), Harry Duggan.

Irish republicanism, as well as being entrenched in the area, was also not unknown of in his family - his brother Michael had already served a prison sentence for IRA membership and possession of explosives. O'Connell soon became a training officer around the Republic of Ireland.

== IRA operations ==
O'Connell and fellow ASU member Brendan Dowd flew from Shannon Airport, County Clare to Heathrow in early August 1974, under the guise of looking for work in London. They rented a flat in Fulham (west London) for both living quarters and the storage of nitroglycerine and other equipment.

O'Connell, as the bomb-maker of the group, was responsible for making the first devices the ASU let off in their campaign, in the Guildford pub bombings on 5 October 1974. This was the beginning of a wide-ranging and peripatetic number of attacks O'Connell was involved in, ranging from the bombing of the Kings Arms, Woolwich, to throwing hand bombs into Sir Edward Heath's club and the Harrow School and the assassination of an insurance broker.

== Arrest and release ==
Along with other members of the unit, he was eventually cornered by the Metropolitan Police in Balcombe Street and arrested after a week-long siege. He was charged with sixty offences including 12 murders, conspiring to cause explosions and false imprisonment He received twelve life sentences and a whole life tariff. O'Connell made a speech from the dock in which he said:

We have recognised this court to the extent that we have instructed our lawyers to draw the attention of the court to the fact that four totally innocent people – Carole Richardson, Gerry Conlon, Paul Hill and Paddy Armstrong – are serving massive sentences for three bombings, two in Guildford and one in Woolwich, which three of us and another man now imprisoned, have admitted that we did.

After serving 23 years in English prisons the four men were transferred to the high security wing of Portlaoise Prison, Ireland, in early 1998. They were presented by Gerry Adams to the 1998 Sinn Féin Ard Fheis as 'our Nelson Mandelas', and were released together with Brendan Dowd and Liam Quinn in 1999 as part of the Belfast Agreement.
