= Record Breakers =

British children's television series (1972–2001)

- Also known as: Linford's Record Breakers (1998–2000)
- Created by: Alan Russell
- Developed by: BBC
- Presented by: Roy Castle; Fiona Kennedy; Cheryl Baker; Kriss Akabusi; Kate Sanderson; Linford Christie; Sally Gray; Fearne Cotton
- Starring: Norris McWhirter; Ross McWhirter
- Country of origin: United Kingdom
- Original language: English
- No. of series: 30
- No. of episodes: 276

Production
- Camera setup: Multi-camera
- Running time: 25 minutes

Original release
- Network: BBC1
- Release: 15 December 1972 – 21 December 2001

Related
- Blue Peter

Record Breakers is a British children's television show, themed around world records and produced by the BBC. It was broadcast on BBC1 from 15 December 1972 to 21 December 2001.

== Format ==
The programme was a spin-off series from Blue Peter which had featured record breaking attempts overseen by the McWhirter twins. As well as interviews with people who held British or World records, early editions of the programme would include a feature in which the studio audience would test the McWhirter brothers on their (almost infallible) knowledge of records, and the climax of each show would usually be a world record attempt in the studio, e.g. including actor Duke London.

== Presenters ==
It was originally presented by Roy Castle with Guinness World Records founders twin brothers Norris McWhirter and Ross McWhirter. Other hosts during this period included Dilys Morgan in 1973, Fiona Kennedy (1983–1986), Julian Farino (1985–1986), Cheryl Baker (1987–1997) and Kriss Akabusi (1993–1997). Ross was murdered by a Provisional IRA gunman in 1975, but his brother continued to appear on the show in the "Norris on the Spot" feature. Norris carried on as the book's sole editor until he left the show in 1985.

After Castle died in 1994, the show continued to be hosted by Baker and Akabusi, alongside newcomers Mark Curry in 1995 and later Ronald Reagan Jr. (1996–1997) who presented a report from the USA each week. The programme was revamped in 1998 and returned as Linford's Record Breakers, hosted by Linford Christie with new co-presenters Jack Lattimer, Kate Gerbeau and Jez Edwards. Lattimer and Gerbeau left after one series and were replaced by Sally Gray for the next two series. The show's original title returned for the final series in 2001; this was hosted by Edwards, alongside Fearne Cotton and Shovell.

== Production ==
The closing theme was "Dedication", performed by Roy Castle, who broke nine world records on the show himself. Producers of the series over the years were, Alan Russell (its creator), Michael Forte, Eric Rowan, Greg Childs, Annette Williams and Jeremy Daldry.

By the time Record Breakers was cancelled, it had been on air for 29 years, 7 days and was one of the longest-running TV programmes in Britain.

== Specials ==
All Star Record Breakers, which ran annually from 1974 to 1982, was a special Christmas edition of the show. Castle was joined for this extended edition by virtually all the BBC's children's TV presenters for music and dance numbers, which generally culminated with the ensemble cast performing a classic story.

== Transmission guide ==
=== Original series ===
Series	Start date	End date	Episodes
1	15 December 1972	19 January 1973	6
2	5 October 1973	9 November 1973	6
3	5 November 1974	17 December 1974	7
4	30 September 1975	11 November 1975	7
5	27 October 1976	1 December 1976	6
6	7 October 1977	18 November 1977	7
7	24 October 1978	12 December 1978	8
8	6 November 1979	18 December 1979	7
9	22 October 1980	7 January 1981	12
10	21 October 1981	23 December 1981	10
11	27 October 1982	22 December 1982	9
12	25 October 1983	20 December 1983	9
13	8 January 1985	5 March 1985	9
14	1 November 1985	20 December 1985	8
15	21 October 1986	16 December 1986	9
16	27 October 1987	22 December 1987	9
17	21 October 1988	16 December 1988	9
18	20 October 1989	15 December 1989	9
19	28 September 1990	14 December 1990	10
20	27 September 1991	13 December 1991	10
21	25 September 1992	11 December 1992	10
22	24 September 1993	10 December 1993	10
23	7 October 1994	23 December 1994	12
24	29 September 1995	22 December 1995	13
25	23 September 1996	16 December 1996	13
26	26 September 1997	19 December 1997	13
27	16 October 1998	18 December 1998	10
28	1 October 1999	19 November 1999	8
29	20 October 2000	8 December 2000	8
30	2 November 2001	21 December 2001	8

=== All Star Record Breakers ===
Air Date
27 December 1974
30 December 1975
24 December 1976
28 December 1977
27 December 1978
27 December 1979
24 December 1980
27 December 1981
26 December 1982

=== Specials ===
Entitle	Air Date
Japan Domino Toppling	10 April 1981
The Big Jump	25 October 1985
Dominoes	17 February 1988
Roy Castle Tribute	30 September 1994
Roy Castle – Personality Plus	28 December 1994

=== Record Breakers Gold ===
Series	Start date	End date	Episodes
1	1 January 1997	24 March 1997	13
2	5 January 1998	30 March 1998	13

== See also ==
- Guinness World Records Smashed
