= Scott's (restaurant) =

London seafood restaurant active since the mid-19th century

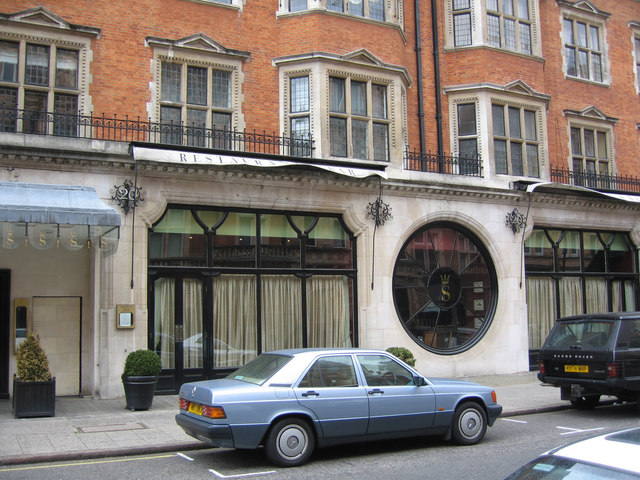
- Scott's restaurant, Mount Street, in 2005
- Interactive map of Scott's

Restaurant information
- Established: 1872; 154 years ago
- Owner: Caprice Group
- Food type: Seafood
- Location: 20 Mount Street, London, England
- Coordinates: 51.5099°N 0.1508°W
- Website: www.scotts-restaurant.com

Scott's is a seafood restaurant at 20 Mount Street, Mayfair, London. Originating as "Scott's oyster rooms" in Haymarket in the 1850s or earlier, it would become "Scott's Oyster and Supper Rooms" on Coventry Street in 1891, and moved to its present location in Mount Street in 1967. Scott's was a favourite of Ian Fleming. In 1975 it was attacked twice by the Irish Republican Army (IRA). The restaurant is part of the Caprice Holdings Limited group who also own The Ivy.

== History ==
=== Nineteenth century ===
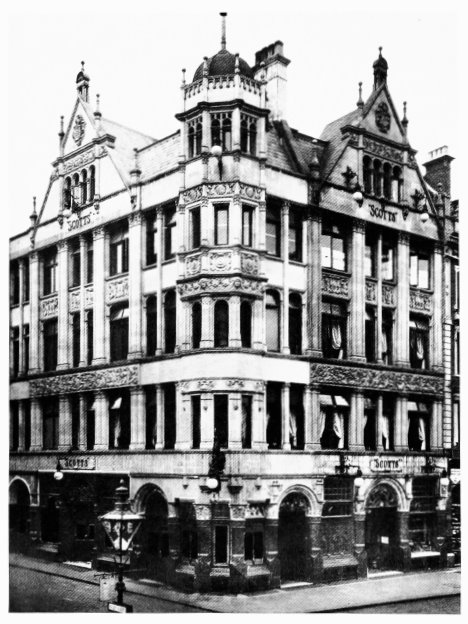
Scott's in 1895, in Coventry Street

A "Scott's oyster rooms" in or near Haymarket existed from at least 1853. In that year a Paul Shoreditch of Devereaux Court [sic], Temple, was brought before a judge for trying to pass a forged £5 note at the establishment. In 1859 a man was charged with assaulting a waiter at Scott's oyster rooms in Coventry Street.

In 1872, Charles Sonnhammer and Emil Loibl, the owners of the London Pavilion music hall, established an "oyster warehouse" at 18 Coventry Street. It stood on the corner with Great Windmill Street. Sonnhammer became the sole owner in 1875 following the break up of his partnership with Loibl in 1874. The business changed ownership again in 1876 and once more in 1891 when it became known as Scott's Oyster and Supper Rooms, located at numbers 18 and 19.

In 1892–94, numbers 18 and 19, together with number 20, were rebuilt in Bath stone to the design of architects Treadwell and Martin in a style described by the Survey of London in 1963 as being known at the time as "early French renaissance". The survey continued:

Wine and coffee bars, 'lobster-boiling rooms', etc., were planned for the basement, oyster bars and a grill-room for the ground floor, with three floors of dining-rooms above, and pantries and sculleries on the top floor. The two façades on this corner site are related, each having a gable (one dated 1892, the other 1894) and there is an octagonal oriel-turret at the angle, with carved panels containing scallop-shells. Bands of carved vegetation are still visible on the Great Windmill Street front. The plinth and stunted columns of polished dark Labrador granite, and the unpolished Kemnay granite up to the first-floor sills have been coloured black and the Bath stone above appears to have been painted.

As of 2015, the Coventry Street building still exists complete with decorations of an S monogram and shells in stone. It is now part of the Trocadero Centre.

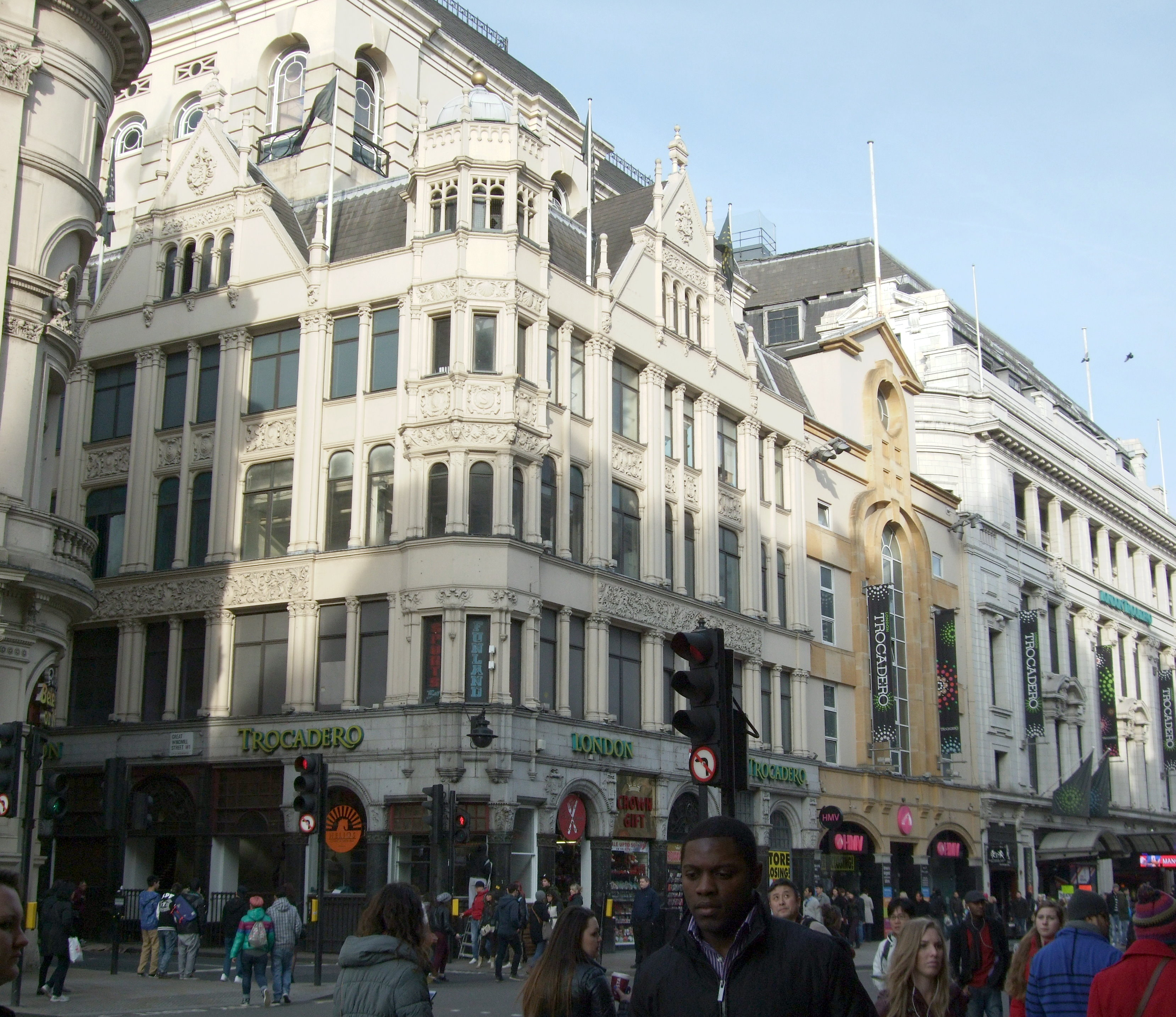
The old Scott's as it looks today

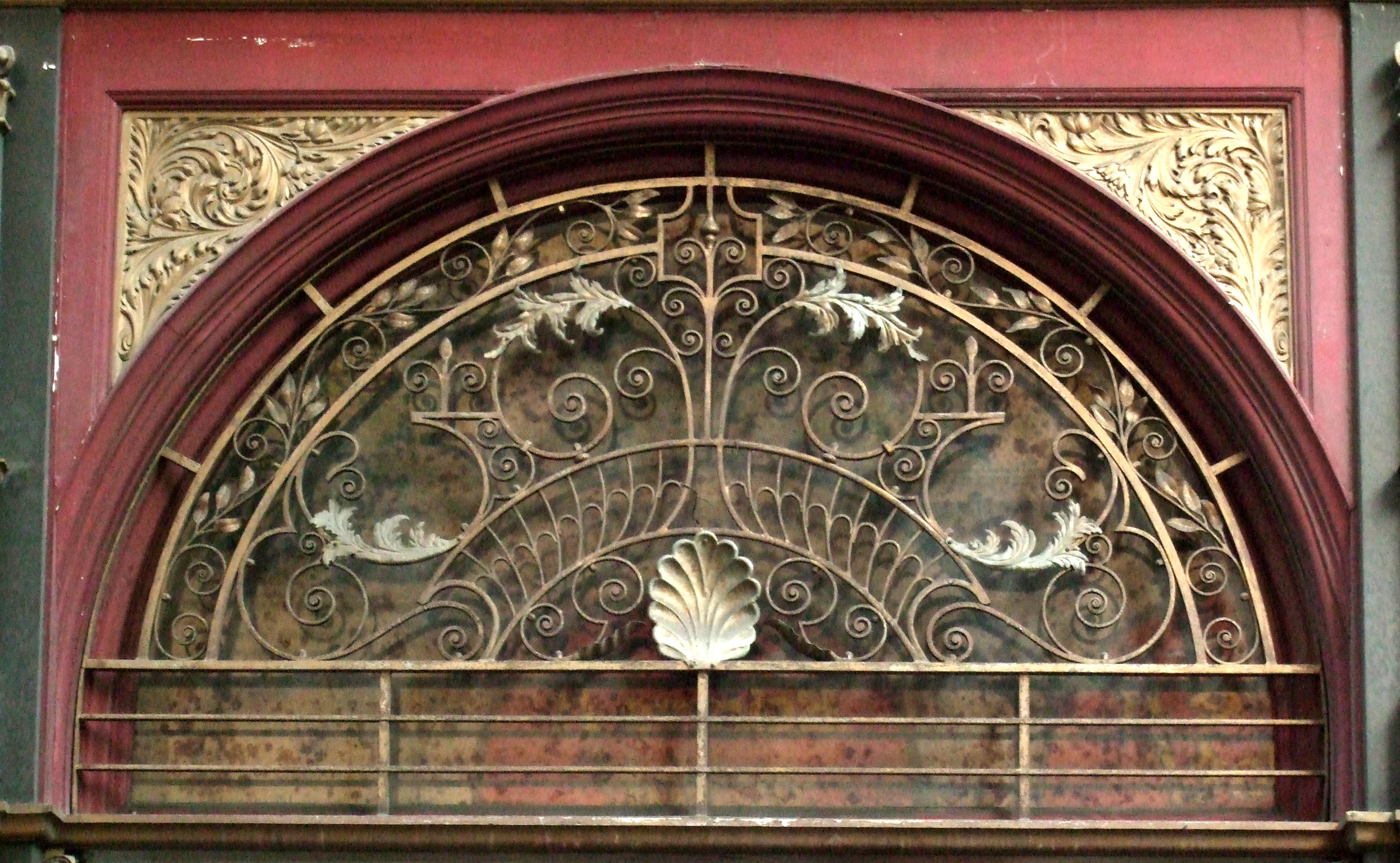
Ironwork with shell motif, western elevation

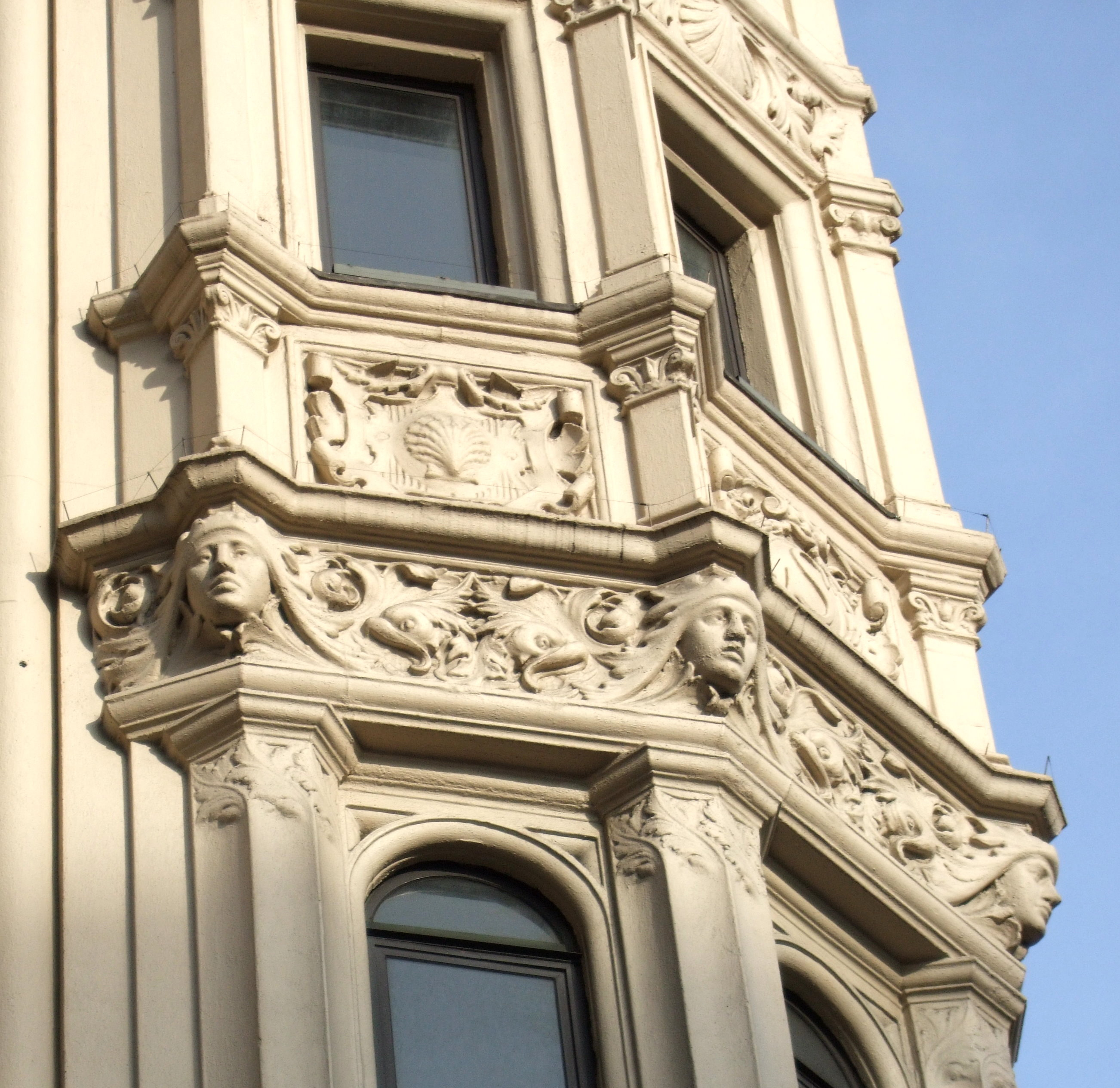
Shell and fishes decorations

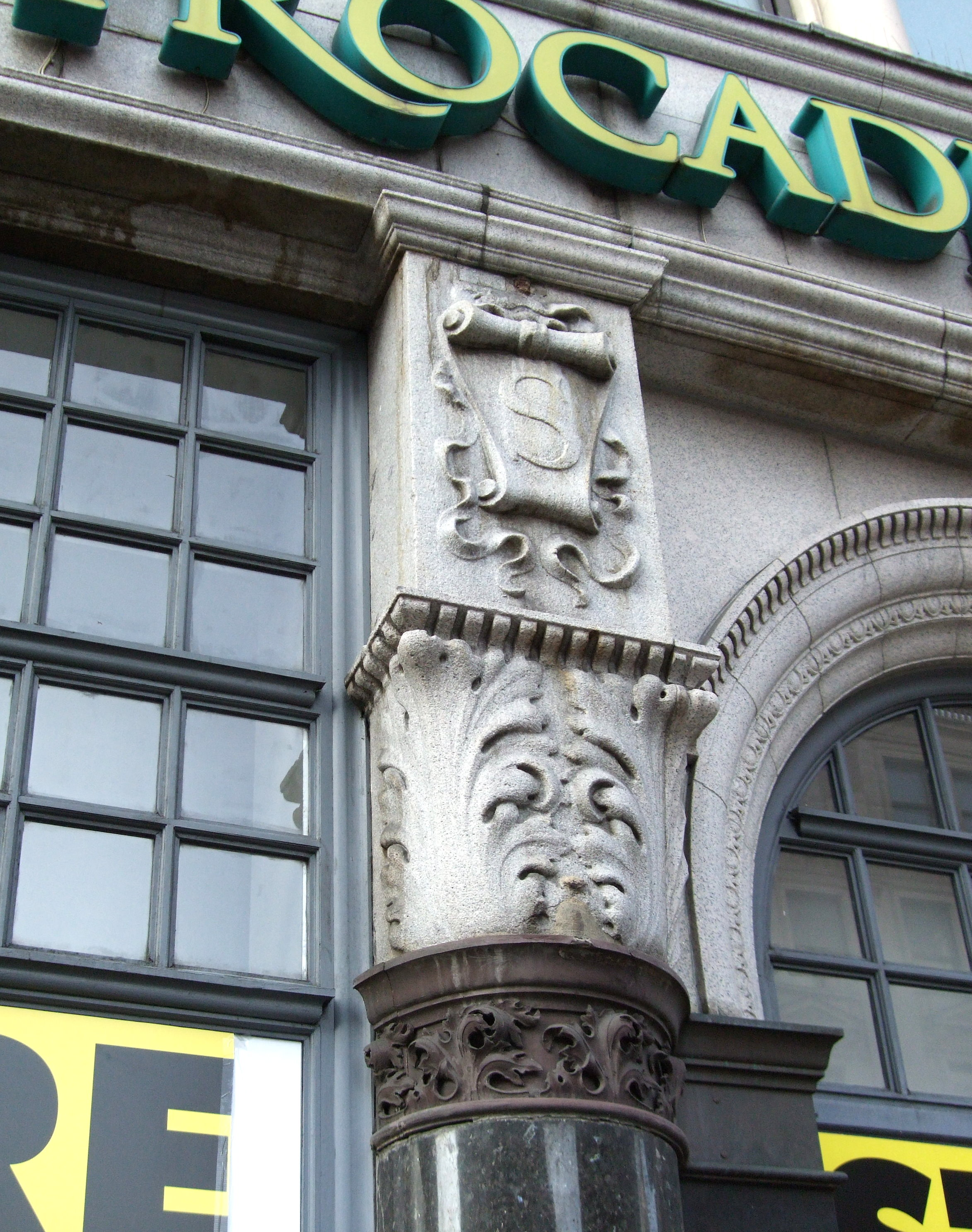
S monogram

=== Twentieth century ===
In 1914, Scott's was described as "the hub of the West End of London".

During the Second World War, James Bond author Ian Fleming had the idea of taking captured German U-boat officers Werner Lott and his second in command, for a day out and lunch at Scott's with the aim of getting them drunk so that they would reveal how they had managed to evade British mines in the Skagerrak. The plan failed but not before the restaurant filled with police officers from Special Branch after the head waiter overheard the party speaking in German. Later, when Scott's was still in Coventry Street, Fleming made his regular spot at the restaurant, a right-hand corner table for two on the first floor, the favourite also of Bond.

In 1967, the restaurant moved to Mount Street. Art dealer Robert Fraser had a flat on the third floor above the restaurant.

Anticipating the move to Mount Street, Kingsley Amis, in the first James Bond continuation novel, Colonel Sun, has Bond lunching at Scott's and fearing the worst: "But Bond had recently heard that the whole north side [of Coventry Street] was doomed to demolition, and counted every meal taken in those severe but comfortable panelled rooms a tiny victory over the new hateful London of steel and glass matchbox architecture".

On 12 November 1975, John Batey, aged 59, was killed when an IRA bomb exploded in the restaurant. Fifteen others were wounded. In December 1975, the IRA attacked the restaurant again, firing from a Ford Cortina as they drove past. The police had noticed that the IRA sometimes attacked the same location twice, and with little other intelligence to go on, had flooded London with plain clothes officers at vulnerable sites. Inspector John Purnell and Sergeant Phil McVeigh, who were both unarmed, were on the spot and were able to give chase in a London taxi despite several shots being fired at them. The terrorists were forced to abandon their car after driving into a cul-de-sac and continued on foot until they reached Balcombe Street where they barricaded themselves in a council flat with two hostages in what became known as the Balcombe Street siege.

In 1988, Kingsley Amis reviewed the restaurant for The Illustrated London News, noting that the decor was "luxurious to the safe side of vulgarity".

=== Twenty-first century ===
In 2013, the Financial Times reported that Scott's had been patronised in the recent past by former US President Bill Clinton, actor Tom Cruise and Angolan businesswoman Isabel dos Santos.

In 2013, Scott's was the scene of the argument between Charles Saatchi and his then wife Nigella Lawson, which led to Saatchi being cautioned for assault by the Metropolitan Police.

== See also ==
- List of seafood restaurants
