= Ross McWhirter =

English writer, political activist (1925–1975)

- Born: Alan Ross McWhirter; 12 August 1925; Winchmore Hill, Middlesex, England
- Died: 27 November 1975 (aged 50); Enfield, London, England
- Cause of death: Gunshot
- Education: Marlborough College; Trinity College, Oxford
- Occupations: Writer; political activist; television presenter
- Notable credit(s): The Guinness Book of Records, Record Breakers
- Spouse: Rosemary J. Hamilton-Grice
- Relatives: Norris McWhirter (twin brother)

Alan Ross McWhirter (12 August 1925 – 27 November 1975) was, with his twin brother, Norris, the cofounder of the 1955 Guinness Book of Records (known since 2000 as Guinness World Records) and a contributor to the television programme Record Breakers. He was assassinated by the Provisional Irish Republican Army (IRA) in 1975.

== Early life ==
McWhirter was the youngest son of William McWhirter, editor of the Sunday Pictorial, and Margaret "Bunty" Williamson. He was born at 10 Branscombe Gardens, Winchmore Hill, in London. In 1929, as William was working on the founding of the Northcliffe Newspapers Group chain of provincial newspapers, the family moved to Aberfoyle, in Broad Walk, Winchmore Hill. Ross McWhirter was educated at Chesterton School, Seaford, Marlborough College and Trinity College, Oxford.

Between 1943 and 1946, Ross served as a sub-lieutenant with the Royal Naval Volunteer Reserve aboard a minesweeper in the Mediterranean. McWhirter maintained his home and Guinness Publishing business in the Middlesex area as it became the Municipal Borough of Edmonton, then London Borough of Enfield, and finally as part of Greater London in 1965.

== Career ==
Ross and Norris both became sports journalists in 1950. In 1951, they published Get to Your Marks, and earlier that year they had founded an agency to provide facts and figures to Fleet Street, endeavouring "to supply facts and figures to newspapers, yearbooks, encyclopaedias and advertisers."

While building their business, they both worked as sports journalists. They knew and covered runner Christopher Chataway, a Guinness employee who recommended them to Hugh Beaver. After an interview in 1954 in which the Guinness directors enjoyed testing the twins' knowledge of records and unusual facts, the brothers agreed to start work on the book that would become The Guinness Book of Records. In August 1955, the first slim green volume, 198 pages long, appeared at bookstalls, and within four more months it had become the UK's number one nonfiction bestseller. Both brothers were regulars on the BBC show Record Breakers. They were noted for their encyclopedic memories, enabling them to provide detailed answers to questions from the audience about entries in The Guinness Book of Records. Norris continued to appear on the programme after Ross's death.

In 1958, long after the legend of William Webb Ellis as the originator of rugby had become engrained in rugby culture, Ross managed to rediscover Ellis's grave in a cemetery in Menton in Alpes Maritimes (it has since been renovated by the French Rugby Federation).

In 1965, Ross and Norris were guests on the American panel game show I've Got a Secret, where they exhibited their memorisation of the Guinness Book of Records.

== Politics ==
In the early 1960s, McWhirter was a Conservative Party activist and unsuccessfully fought the seat of Edmonton in the 1964 general election. Following his killing, his brother and others founded the National Association for Freedom (later the Freedom Association).

His views were on the right wing of the political spectrum.

== Controversy ==
=== Ireland ===
McWhirter advocated and lobbied for various restrictions on the freedom of the Irish community in Britain, such as compulsory registration with the local police and a requirement for signed photographs when renting flats or booking hotel rooms. In 1975, McWhirter offered a £50,000 reward (equivalent to £388,000 in 2025) for information leading to a conviction for several recent high-profile bombings in England that were publicly claimed by the Provisional Irish Republican Army (IRA). In doing so, McWhirter recognised that he could then be a target. This was described as a bounty by McWhirter, and considered a bounty by the IRA Army Council, a view that led directly to the events that followed. The idea was not originally his but that of John Gouriet.

=== Capital punishment ===
McWhirter advocated for capital punishment for terrorism offences. During a press conference on 4 November 1975, he proposed that terrorism be classified as treason and as a result carry the death penalty.

=== Alleged links to British intelligence ===
In his 1981 book, former counterterrorism operative Gordon Winter of the South African Bureau of State Security recalled a briefing with his London-based handler Alf Bouwer warning him to be wary of McWhirter, who he claimed was a British intelligence operative and member of the right-wing, anti-immigration Society for Individual Freedom, which he described as a "front" for "disseminating Establishment-type propaganda."

== Assassination ==
On 27 November 1975 at 6:45 p.m., McWhirter was shot and killed by Provisional IRA Volunteers Harry Duggan and Hugh Doherty, members of the IRA active service unit that was later dubbed the Balcombe Street Gang, for whose capture McWhirter had offered a reward. McWhirter was shot at close range in the head and chest with a .357 Magnum revolver outside his home in Village Road, Bush Hill Park. He was taken to Chase Farm Hospital but died soon after being admitted. Duggan and Doherty were apprehended following the Balcombe Street siege and charged with murdering McWhirter in addition to nine other victims. They were sentenced to life imprisonment in 1977 but released in 1999 under the terms of the Good Friday Agreement.

== Selected bibliography ==
Sports and general encyclopædia

- Get to Your Marks (1951, with Norris McWhirter) OCLC 963645353
- The Guinness Book of Records (1955–1975, with Norris McWhirter)
- Ross: The Story of a Shared Life (Norris McWhirter) ISBN 0-902782-23-1, OCLC 3540709
- Ross Was Right – The McWhirter File (Covenant Pub., 29 September 2014) ISBN 978-085205-118-4, OCLC 911093351

== See also ==
- List of journalists killed in Europe
