= Gordon Hamilton Fairley =

British scientist and cancer researcher

- Born: 20 April 1930; Australia
- Died: 23 October 1975 (aged 45); Kensington, London, England
- Cause of death: IRA car bomb
- Occupation: Professor of medical oncology

Gordon Hamilton Fairley DM, FRCP (20 April 1930 – 23 October 1975) was a professor of medical oncology. Born and raised in Australia, he moved to the United Kingdom, where he studied and worked. He was killed by a Provisional Irish Republican Army (IRA) bomb intended to assassinate Sir Hugh Fraser.

== Life and work ==
The son of a research worker in tropical diseases, Sir Neil Hamilton Fairley, Fairley grew up in Melbourne. He later studied at Magdalen College, Oxford, and St Bartholomew's Hospital, London. Trained in hematology as Leverhulme Research Scholar at the Royal College of Physicians, he continued his research with an emphasis on immunohematology.

In 1968, he became director of the Clinical Research Unit at the Institute of Cancer Research. Two years afterward, he became director of the Medical Oncology Research Unit. In 1972, he was appointed Imperial Cancer Fund Professor of Oncology. As Professor of Medical Oncology at St Bartholomew's Hospital, he contributed a great deal to the chemotherapy and immunology of malignant disease, and, in particular, to the treatment of the malignant reticuloses.

In 1969, he delivered the Goulstonian Lecture to the Royal College of Physicians.

== Death ==
The 45-year-old Fairley was killed by an IRA bomb in Kensington, London, on 23 October 1975 whilst walking his dog. The bomb, placed under a car outside the Fraser family home, was intended for Sir Hugh Fraser. Fraser, a long time friend of the Kennedy family, had been hosting Caroline Kennedy at the time. The Balcombe Street Gang were subsequently convicted of Fairley's murder.

Brian Keenan, a senior IRA commander, was also apprehended and stood trial at the Old Bailey in London in June 1980 accused of organising the IRA's bombing campaign in England and being implicated in the deaths of eight people, including Fairley. Keenan was sentenced to 18 years' imprisonment after being found guilty on 25 June 1980.

== Personal life ==
Fairley was married with four children, the youngest of whom was 12 years old when he died. Fairley had been offered an appointment as Elizabeth II's personal physician, but had turned it down, preferring to work with the public.

== Legacy ==
Fairley is commemorated by a memorial sculpted by Richard Kindersley in the crypt of St Paul's Cathedral which reads: "Gordon Hamilton-Fairley DM FRCP, first professor of medical oncology, 1930-75. Killed by a terrorist bomb. It matters not how a man dies but how he lives".

A ward at St Bartholomew's Hospital was named after him.

The European Society for Medical Oncology awards an annual medal and prize for a contribution to cancer research, named in honour of Fairley.

In 1982, his widow, Daphne, who was a speech and language therapist, established a specialist therapy school, Fairley House School, as a memorial to Fairley. Originally located in Prince's Gate, since 2005 the school has been located on Lambeth Road.
