= Guildford pub bombings =

1974 IRA bombings in Surrey, England

- Part of The Troubles
- Location: 51.237054°N 0.571753°W; Horse & Groom pub; Seven Stars pub, Guildford, England
- Date: 5 October 1974; 20:30 – 21:00 (BST)
- Target: British Army soldiers
- Attack type: Time bombs
- Deaths: 5 (4 off-duty British soldiers and 1 civilian)
- Injuries: 65+ (30 seriously)
- Perpetrators: Provisional IRA; Provisional IRA's Balcombe Street Gang

The Provisional Irish Republican Army (IRA) detonated two 6-pound (2.7-kilogram) gelignite bombs at two pubs in Guildford, Surrey, England on 5 October 1974. The pubs were targeted that evening because they were popular with British Army personnel stationed at Pirbright barracks. Four soldiers and one civilian were killed. Sixty-five people were wounded.

== The bombings ==
In 1974, a number of pubs in Guildford town centre were known to be "army pubs", frequented by military personnel stationed in the area. These included the Horse & Groom on North Street, The Seven Stars in Swan Lane, and the Three Pigeons on the High Street. The Provisional IRA Army Council had authorised attacks in England at a meeting in 1973, and army pubs were viewed as soft military targets.

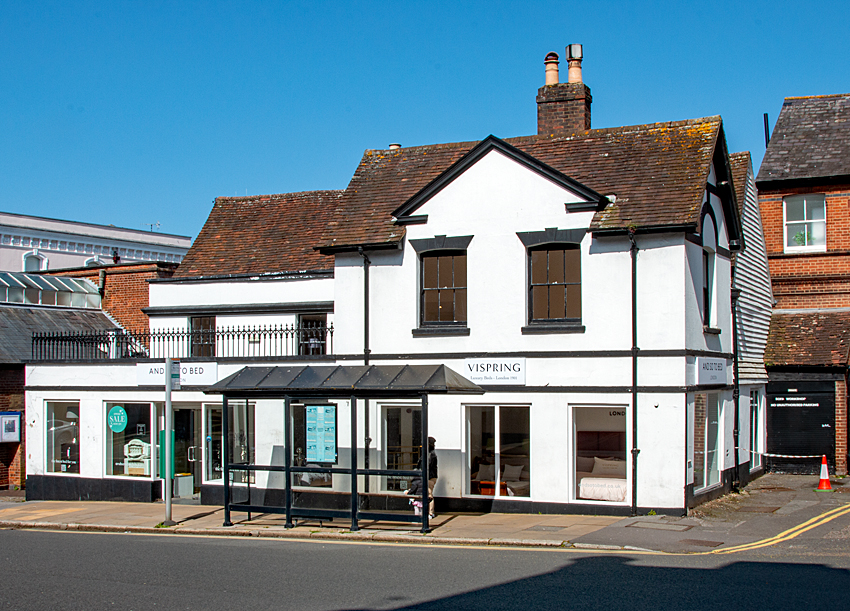
The former Horse & Groom pub in 2023.

The bomb in the Horse & Groom, thought to have been planted by a "courting couple" who have never been identified, detonated at 8.30pm, killing a civilian (Paul Craig), two members of the Scots Guards (William Forsyth and John Hunter) and two members of the Women's Royal Army Corps (Privates Ann Hamilton and Caroline Slater). The Seven Stars was evacuated after the first blast, and a second bomb exploded at 9pm while the pub landlord and his wife were searching the pub. The landlord sustained a fractured skull and his wife a broken leg, and five members of staff and one customer who had just stepped outside received less serious injuries.

These attacks were the first in a year-long campaign by an IRA active service unit who became known as the Balcombe Street Gang – whom police arrested in December 1975 after the Balcombe Street siege leading to their trial and conviction for other murders and offences. A similar bomb to those used in Guildford, with the addition of shrapnel, was thrown into the Kings Arms pub in Woolwich on 7 November 1974. A soldier and a civilian died in that explosion.

The Guildford bombings occurred only five days before the October 1974 United Kingdom general election. As all parties felt obliged to respond to the events, they contributed to the speedy and unchallenged passing of the Prevention of Terrorism Acts in November 1974.

== The Guildford Four ==
The bombings were at the height of the Troubles in Northern Ireland. The Metropolitan Police were pressured to apprehend the IRA bombers responsible for the attacks in England. In December 1974, the police arrested three men and a woman, later known as the Guildford Four. One of the four, Gerry Conlon, had been in London at the time of the bombings, and had visited his mother's sister, Annie Maguire. A few days after the Guildford Four were arrested, the Metropolitan Police arrested Annie Maguire and her family, including Conlon's father, Patrick "Giuseppe" Conlon – the "Maguire Seven".

The Guildford Four were wrongfully convicted of the bombings in October 1975 and sentenced to life in prison. The Maguire Seven were wrongfully convicted of providing bomb-making material and other support in March 1976 and sentenced to terms varying between four and fourteen years.

The Guildford Four were held in prison for fifteen years, while Giuseppe Conlon died near the end of his third year of imprisonment. All the convictions were overturned years later in the appeal courts after it was proved the Guildford Four's convictions had been based on confessions obtained by torture (as were some Maguire Seven confessions), whilst evidence specifically clearing the Four was not reported by the police.

During the trial of the Balcombe Street Gang in February 1977, the four IRA members instructed their lawyers to "draw attention to the fact that four totally innocent people were serving massive sentences" for three bombings in Woolwich and Guildford. The Balcombe Street Gang were never charged with these offences. The 1993 film In the Name of the Father is based on these events.

== New investigation ==
The Independent Commission for Reconciliation and Information (ICRIR) has been investigating the bombings since 2024.

== Aftermath ==
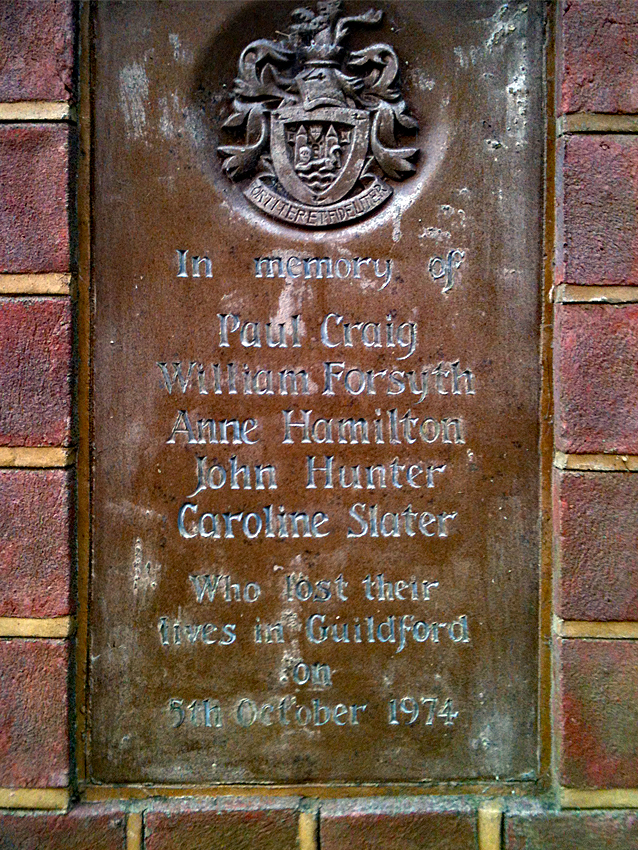
Guildford Bombing Memorial plaque in Quakers' Acre.

The London-based IRA active service unit's next attack was the Woolwich pub bombing on 7 November 1974, two people were killed in this attack, one soldier and a civilian who worked in the pub, over 30 people injured. Two of the Guildford Four were also convicted of this attack.

The Horse & Groom, the most heavily damaged pub, was repaired and reopened a few months later (and was given Grade II Listed Building status in 1988 for its 17th century rear) but was closed and boarded up in 1992, and the building has subsequently been used as a soft furnishing store. A memorial plaque bearing the names of those killed in the pub bombing is attached to the entrance arch of Quakers' Acre, a public garden square on the opposite side of the street.

== See also ==
- Chronology of Provisional IRA actions
- List of public house topics

== Sources ==
- BBC report on the attacks, bbc.co.uk, 5 October 1974; accessed 23 October 2015.
- The Road to Balcombe Street: The IRA Reign of Terror in London – Second Edition by Steven P. Moysey – Author
