= Liam Quinn =

American volunteer in the Provisional Irish Republican Army (born 1949)

William Joseph Quinn
- Born: 1949 (age 76–77); San Francisco, California, United States
- Other name: Liam Quinn
- Status: Released
- Allegiance: Provisional Irish Republican Army
- Conviction: Murder
- Penalty: Life imprisonment (35-year tariff)

William Joseph Quinn, known as Liam Quinn, (born 1949) is an American former volunteer in the Provisional Irish Republican Army who shot dead Stephen Tibble, an off-duty police officer, in London on 26 February 1975.

Tibble saw Quinn fleeing from the police after he had been noticed acting suspiciously near a house in which Quinn and members of the Balcombe Street Gang were later found to have been preparing bombs. The unarmed Tibble chased Quinn on his motorbike and, while attempting to stop him, was fatally shot twice in the chest.

== Extradition ==
Quinn escaped to Dublin in the aftermath of the shooting and served a short prison sentence after his arrest for assaulting a police officer there. After his release in 1978 he returned to his hometown of San Francisco but was arrested in 1981 and later extradited to England in February 1988 where he was convicted of murder and jailed for life with a recommended minimum term of 35 years.

Quinn served 11 years before he was released in April 1999, aged 51, along with the Balcombe Street Gang, under the terms of the Good Friday Agreement. While with the IRA, Quinn affected an Irish accent and was tagged with the nickname "Yankee Joe" because of his American origins.
