= Balcombe Street gang =

IRA bombers

Balcombe Street Gang
- Leader: Joe O'Connell
- Dates active: 1974–1975
- Headquarters: Safe houses in London
- Active regions: Mainly London
- Ideology: Irish republicanism
- Size: 4 involved in the Balcombe Street Siege, plus 2 others involved in the unit before Balcombe Street Siege.
- Part of: Provisional Irish Republican Army
- Wars: the Troubles

The Balcombe Street Gang was a Provisional Irish Republican Army (IRA) active service unit (ASU) (also known as the Balcombe Street Four or the Balcombe Street Unit) who carried out a bombing campaign in southern England in the mid-1970s. The majority of their attacks and attempted attacks took place in London and the rest in Surrey, Hampshire and Wiltshire. Between October 1974 and December 1975 they carried out approximately 40 bomb and gun attacks in and around London, sometimes attacking the same targets twice. The unit would sometimes carry out two or more attacks in one day; on 27 January 1975 they placed seven time bombs in London.

On 25 November 1974, they carried out three bomb attacks in the centre of London injuring 20 people. They were eventually caught during the Balcombe Street siege in December 1975, thus ending their 15-month bombing campaign in England. They have been described as "the most violent, ruthless and highly-trained unit ever sent to Britain by the Provisional IRA".

== Active members ==
The members of the Balcombe Street Gang's ASU were Hugh Doherty, Joseph O'Connell, Eddie Butler and Harry Duggan (these four were captured at the Balcombe Street siege). Liam Quinn (a US-born member) and Brendan Dowd were also active within the unit.

O'Connell and fellow ASU member Dowd flew from Shannon Airport, County Clare, to Heathrow in early August 1974, under the pretence of looking for work in London. O'Connell, as the bomb-maker of the group, was responsible for making the first devices the ASU detonated in their campaign, during the Guildford pub bombings on 5 October 1974. This was the beginning of a wide range of attacks O'Connell was involved in. They varied from the bombing of the Kings Arms, Woolwich, to throwing hand bombs in Sir Edward Heath's club and the murder of an insurance broker.

== Background ==
The targeting of English locations was also used in the 1881-1885 Fenian dynamite campaign and the IRA's 1939-40 bombing and sabotage campaign known as the English Campaign or the S-Plan.The Balcombe Street Unit was possibly the most effective IRA unit ever to carry out a bombing campaign in England. They had a focus on London (in particular the West End of London) where they targeted pubs, clubs and restaurants with bombings and shootings. They attacked several of their targets twice. Within the space of nineteen days they had planted their first six explosive devices, two in Guildford on 5 October, another two in Seymour Street and St. James's Square on the 11th, another at St James's Square on the 22nd and one in Harrow on the 24th.

In spring 1973, the IRA extended its bombing campaign to England, attacking military and symbolically important targets. The aim was to both increase pressure on the British government by swaying popular British opinion, with the goal of British withdrawal from Northern Ireland.

It began on 8 March 1973 when an 11-person ASU (which included Irish republicans such as the Price Sisters and Gerry Kelly) bombed the Old Bailey. Despite warnings, one person died of a heart attack and about 200 were injured, some seriously. The IRA always believed that one bomb in England was worth about 30 in Belfast and the huge media response seemed to prove this theory.

The ASU behind the Old Bailey bombing was caught trying to leave England by plane to Ireland. Although the IRA achieved its objective, it was a tactical error to try to leave so quickly, as British security forces would be extra vigilant at escape routes from England to Ireland.

The IRA General Headquarters realised this mistake. Instead, they decided that instead of sending over a large 10-person ASU for just one day of spectacular bombing, they would use smaller sleeper cells of three or four volunteers to carry out several bombings over a number of months.

IRA attacks in England for the rest of 1973 soon started to become more professional and sophisticated. The following attack was on 18 August 1973 when two IRA firebombs exploded at Harrods Department store, causing some damage but no injuries or deaths. This was the start of their prolonged bombing campaign in England. Just four days later an IRA book bomb exploded at the Conservative Party Central Office in London, injuring several people but none seriously. A few weeks later IRA bombs went off at King's Cross and Euston stations causing 13 injuries and wide spread damage, and panic in central London. From then on IRA bombs became a regular occurrence in London and other major English cities.

By 1974, England saw an average of one attack – successful or otherwise – every three days. These attacks included the Birmingham pub bombings on 21 July which were possibly the first major attacks on the Midlands.

== Trial ==
The Balcombe Street four came to trial at the Old Bailey on 24 January 1977. On 9 February 1977, the jury acquitted the defendants on twenty-six of the hundred indictments. On the remaining charges, the Balcombe Street Four were found guilty and each received a thirty-year minimum sentence. All were released on 14 April 1999 under the terms of the Good Friday Agreement.

== Aftermath ==
In follow-up raids after the siege, police discovered crossword puzzles in Brian Keenan's handwriting and his fingerprints on a list of bomb parts. A warrant was issued for his arrest. He was arrested by the Royal Ulster Constabulary at Banbridge in March 1979 on charges relating to the London campaign in the mid-1970s.

== Type of attacks ==
Most of the attacks carried out by the unit were bombings, but the unit was also involved in several shooting incidents.

The gang used several different methods to deliver and detonate their bombs. The unit's favoured method was using hand-thrown bombs. The unit made and used a series of these grenade-like devices. These were small devices with around 2–5 pounds (1–2 kg) of gelignite in them with a short fuse attached. The fuse would be lit and then thrown at its target by one volunteer while another volunteer would keep lookout. This method was used in the Woolwich pub bombing of November 1974 and the Waltons bombing of November 1975.

Another common method was making either a time bomb or an incendiary device with a timer on it, which would then be planted inside a pub, club, hotel, or other site. This method was used in the Guildford pub bombings of October 1974 and the Hilton bombing of September 1975. The unit also detonated a car bomb at Selfridge's department store on Oxford Street in December 1974. Booby-trap bombs were occasionally used. During these attacks, the unit would also place a second, hidden bomb with a timer nearby with the intent of killing or injuring security services reacting to the initial bombing.

On several occasions, the unit fired shots from rifles and submachine guns (usually Sten guns and M1 carbines) into hotels and restaurants, as in the attacks on the Carlton Tower Hotel and the Portman Hotel in January 1975. The gang also shot and killed several people, the most famous of whom was Guinness Book of Records founder Ross McWhirter in November 1975.

Nineteen people were killed in the ASU's campaign: 16 from bombings and three in shootings. Six of the dead were British military personnel, one was a London police officer, one was a member of the bomb squad, and 11 were civilians.
