= Active service unit =

IRA cell tasked with carrying out attacks

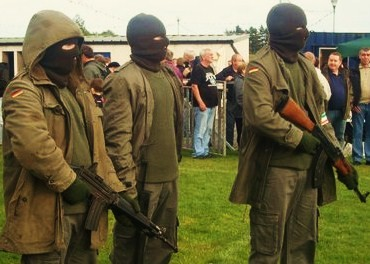
Active service unit at a 1981 hunger strikes commemoration in Galbally, County Tyrone, 2009, as part of a re-enactment. The weapons are a Beretta AR70, a MAC-10 machine pistol (with sound suppressor) and an AK-47 assault rifle.

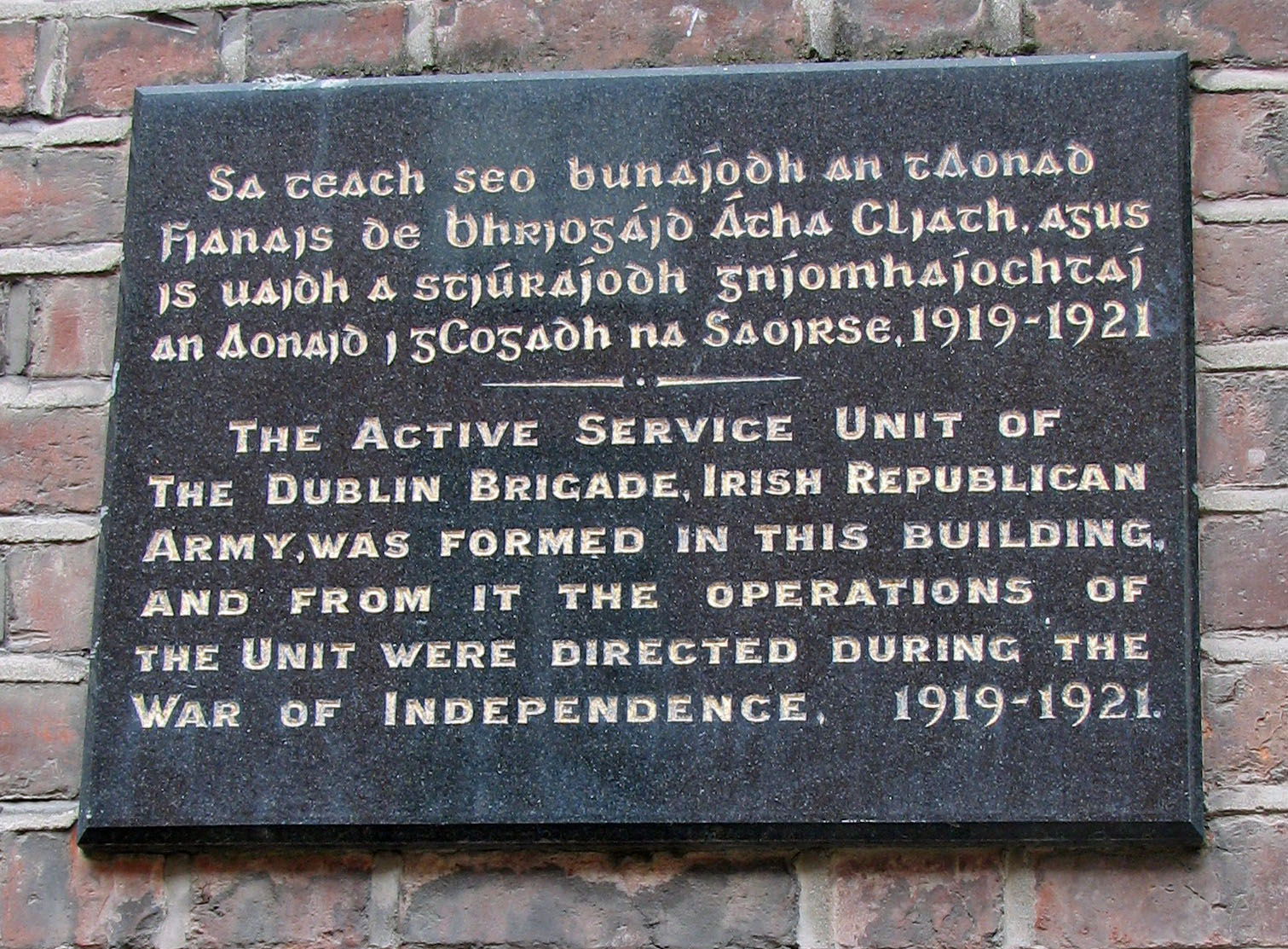
Wall plaque in Great Denmark Street, Dublin where the 1919 IRA Active Service Unit of the Dublin Brigade was founded. Every Brigade had an Active Service Unit; these were also called "Flying Columns".

An active service unit (ASU; Irish: aonad seirbhíse cogúla) was a Provisional Irish Republican Army (IRA) cell of four to ten members, tasked with carrying out armed attacks. In 2002, the IRA had about 1,000 active members of which about 300 were in active service units. The concept was first pioneered by Tom McEllistrim and other members of the Irish Republican Army.

== History ==
In 1977, the IRA moved away from the larger conventional military organisational principle owing to its perceived security vulnerability. In place of the battalion structures, a system of two parallel types of unit within an IRA Brigade was introduced. Firstly, the old "company" structures were used to supply auxiliary members for support activities such as intelligence-gathering, acting as lookouts or moving weapons.

The bulk of attacks from 1977 onwards were the responsibility of a second type of unit, the ASU. To improve security and operational capacity these ASUs were smaller, tight-knit cells, usually consisting of five to eight members, for carrying out armed attacks. The ASU's weapons were controlled by a quartermaster under the direct control of the IRA leadership. By the late 1980s and early 1990s, it was estimated that the IRA had roughly 300 members in ASUs and approximately 450 serving in supporting roles.

The exception to this reorganisation was the South Armagh Brigade which retained its traditional hierarchy and battalion structure and used relatively large numbers of volunteers in its actions. Some operations, like the attack on Cloghogue checkpoint or the South Armagh sniper squads, involved as many as 20 volunteers, most of them in supporting roles.

The smaller Republican paramilitary organisation the INLA also used the term "active service unit", as did the Loyalist paramilitary groups the Ulster Volunteer Force and Ulster Defence Association.

== See also ==
- Flying Columns, terminology for some types of Irish Volunteers units of circa the 1920s
- Fireteam and Squad, terminology for functional types of modern military units of similar size

== Bibliography ==
- O'Hearn, Denis. Bobby Sands: Nothing but an Unfinished Song, Pluto, ISBN 0-7453-2572-6
- Bell, J. Bowyer. The Secret Army - The IRA, 1997 3rd Edition, ISBN 1-85371-813-0
- Moloney Ed, The Secret History of the IRA, Penguin, London 2002, ISBN 0-14-101041-X
- O'Brien. Brendan, The Long War - The IRA and Sinn Féin. O'Brien Press, Dublin 1995, ISBN 0-86278-359-3
- ASUs in the Irish War of Independence
