= List of bombings during the Troubles =

This is a list of notable bombings related to the Northern Ireland "Troubles" and their aftermath. It includes bombings that took place in Northern Ireland, the Republic of Ireland, and Great Britain since 1968. During the conflict (1968–1998), there were at least 10,000 bomb attacks in Northern Ireland alone.

== 1969 ==
- 5 August - RTÉ Studio bombing: The Ulster Volunteer Force (UVF) detonated a bomb at Raidió Teilifís Éireann (RTÉ) headquarters in Donnybrook, Dublin, Republic of Ireland, causing significant damage.

== 1970 ==
- 11 August – 1970 Crossmaglen bombing: Two Royal Ulster Constabulary (RUC) officers were killed by a booby-trap car bomb exploded in Crossmaglen, County Armagh. They were the first RUC victims of the IRA.

== 1971 ==
- 2 November – Red Lion Pub bombing: Three Protestant civilians were killed and dozens injured by an IRA bomb attack on a Protestant bar on Ormeau Road, Belfast.
- 4 December – McGurk's Bar bombing: There were 15 civilians killed and 17 injured by a UVF bomb attack on a Catholic bar in Belfast.
- 11 December – 1971 Balmoral Furniture Company bombing: Three Protestant civilians—two of them children—and a Roman Catholic civilian were killed. 19 people were injured in the attack. No group claimed credit for the attack but it was believed to have been carried out by the IRA.

== 1972 ==
- 22 February – Aldershot bombing: Seven people were killed by an Official IRA bomb at Aldershot Barracks in England, thought to be in retaliation for Bloody Sunday. Six of those killed were female ancillary workers and the seventh was a Roman Catholic military chaplain.
- 4 March – Abercorn Restaurant bombing: A bomb exploded without warning in the Abercorn restaurant on Castle Lane, Belfast. Two were killed and another 130 were injured.
- 23 March – Donegall Street bombing: The IRA detonated a massive car bomb in Lower Donegall Street in Belfast's city centre. Seven people were killed in the explosion, including two members of the RUC. 148 people were injured.
- 21 July – Bloody Friday: The IRA exploded 35 bombs across Northern Ireland, and three large car bombs exploded in Derry, causing no injuries. The Belfast–Dublin train line was also bombed. The IRA detonated 22 bombs in Belfast's city center; nine people were killed (including two British soldiers and one Ulster Defence Association (UDA) member) from two bombs while 130 were injured.
- 31 July – Claudy bombing: Nine civilians were killed by a car bomb in Claudy, County Londonderry. No group has claimed responsibility, though the IRA was suspected.
- 22 August – Newry customs bombing: A bomb planted by the IRA detonated prematurely at a customs office in Newry. Three IRA members killed six civilians and themselves in the explosion.
- 14 September – Imperial Hotel bombing 1972: The UVF detonated a car bomb outside a hotel near Antrim Road, Belfast, which killed three people and injured 50 others. 91-year-old Martha Smilie, a Protestant civilian, was the oldest person killed during the Troubles.
- 31 October – Benny's Bar bombing: The UDA exploded a bomb outside a pub in Belfast, killing two Catholic children and injuring 12 people.
- 1 December – 1972 and 1973 Dublin bombings: Two civilians were killed and 127 were injured by two Ulster loyalist car bombs in Dublin, Republic of Ireland.
- 28 December – Belturbet bombing: Loyalist paramilitaries exploded a bomb in Belturbet, County Cavan, Ireland, which killed two teenagers and injured 8 other people, at the same time a bomb exploded in Clones, County Monaghan, injuring two other people.

== 1973 ==
- 8 March – 1973 Old Bailey bombing: A civilian died from the Old Bailey courthouse bombing in London; over 200 were injured, and a simultaneous explosion happened at the Ministry of Agriculture in Westminster. On the same day as the London bombings, 11 bombs exploded in Northern Ireland: five bombs exploded in Belfast, which included a bomb at the Merville Inn pub; five other bombs exploded in Derry in less than an hour. The first bomb exploded at Ebrington Barracks, and another detonated beside the RUC Waterside station. Another bomb exploded in Lurgan, County Armagh. Only one person was injured in the attacks.
- 12 June – 1973 Coleraine bombings. Six Protestant civilians were killed by an IRA bomb in Coleraine, County Londonderry. The warning given prior to the explosion was inadequate.
- 10 September – King's Cross station and Euston station bombings: 13 people were injured when the IRA exploded two bombs at railway stations in Central London.
- 18 December – 1973 Westminster bombing: A car bomb exploded on Thorney Street near Millbank in the City of Westminster, London, injuring 60 people.

== 1974 ==
- 4 February – M62 coach bombing: 12 people were killed by an IRA bomb planted on a coach on the M62 in the West Riding of Yorkshire carrying British soldiers and their families.
- 2 May - Rose & Crown Bar bombing - Six Catholic civilians were killed and 18 injured by a UVF bomb at a bar on Ormeau Road, Belfast.
- 17 May – Dublin and Monaghan bombings: the UVF detonated four bombs (three in Dublin, one in Monaghan) in the Republic of Ireland. They killed 33 civilians including a pregnant woman.
- 17 June – 1974 Houses of Parliament bombing: The IRA bombed the Houses of Parliament in London, injuring 11 people and causing extensive damage.
- 17 July – 1974 Tower of London bombing: The IRA detonated a bomb at the Tower of London, killing a civilian and injuring 41 people.
- 5 October – Guildford pub bombings: four soldiers and one civilian were killed and 65 people injured by IRA bombs at two pubs in Guildford, England.
- 7 November – Woolwich pub bombing: A soldier and a civilian were killed and 35 people injured when the IRA threw a bomb into the Kings Arms public house in Woolwich
- 21 November – Birmingham pub bombings: 21 civilians were killed and 182 injured by IRA bombs at pubs in Birmingham, England.
- 25 & 27 November – 1974 London pillar box bombings: The IRA exploded several bombs over a two-day period, injuring 40 people in total.
- 18 December – 1974 Bristol bombing: The IRA detonated two bombs in Bristol, injuring 20 people.

== 1975 ==
- 5 April – Mountainview Tavern attack: A group calling itself the Republican Action Force bombed a pub in Belfast, killing four Protestant civilians and a UDA member, and injured 50 people.
- 12 April – Strand Bar bombing: The Red Hand Commando (a UVF-linked group) bombed a Belfast pub, killing six Catholic civilians and injuring 50 others.
- 27 August – Caterham Arms pub bombing: The IRA bombed a pub in Surrey, injuring 33 people.
- 9 October – 1975 Piccadilly bombing: The IRA bombed a tube station in London, killing a civilian and injuring 20 others.
- 18 November – Walton's Restaurant bombing: The IRA bombed a restaurant in Knightsbridge, killing two civilians and injured over 20.
- 29 November – Dublin Airport bombing: The UDA bombed Dublin Airport, killing a civilian staff member and injuring 10 people.
- 19 December – Donnelly's Bar and Kay's Tavern attacks: Bombings killed two civilians. The attack was linked to the Glenanne gang.
- 20 December – Biddy Mulligan's pub bombing: The UDA bombed a popular Irish pub in London, injuring five people.
- 31 December – Central Bar bombing: Members of the Irish National Liberation Army (INLA) using a cover name, Armagh People's Republican Army, bombed a pub in Portadown, killing three Protestant civilians and injuring 30 people.

== 1976 ==
- 7 March – Castleblayney bombing: The UVF detonated a car bomb in County Monaghan, killing a civilian and injuring 17 others.
- 17 March – Hillcrest Bar bombing: The UVF detonated a car bomb outside a pub in Tyrone, killing four people and injuring 50.
- 27 March – 1976 Olympia bombing: An IRA bomb exploded in London, killing one civilian and injuring 85 others in the blast. Due to the outrage over this bombing, the IRA temporarily suspended attacks in England.
- 15 May – Charlemont pub attacks: Five Catholic civilians were killed and many injured by two UVF bomb attacks in Belfast and Charlemont, County Armagh.
- 21 July – Christopher Ewart-Biggs, the British Ambassador to Ireland, and his secretary Judith Cook, were killed in Dublin by a bomb planted in Biggs's car.
- 16 October – Garryhinch ambush: The IRA detonated a bomb at a farmhouse in Garryhinch, killing a member of the Garda and badly wounding four others.

== 1978 ==
- 17 February – La Mon restaurant bombing: 12 civilians were killed and 30 injured by an IRA incendiary bomb at the La Mon Restaurant near Belfast.

== 1979 ==
- 30 March – Airey Neave, Conservative MP for Abingdon, was assassinated. A bomb exploded in his car as he left the Palace of Westminster in London. The INLA later claimed responsibility for the assassination.
- 27 August – Warrenpoint ambush: 18 British soldiers were killed by an IRA bomb in Warrenpoint. A gun battle ensued between the IRA and the British Army, in which one civilian was killed. On the same day, four people (including the Queen's cousin Lord Louis Mountbatten) were killed by an IRA bomb on board a boat near the coast of County Sligo.
- 28 August – 1979 Brussels bombing: British Army bandsmen were targeted at the Grand-Place. The bombing injured seven bandsmen and eleven civilians.

== 1980 ==
- 17 January – Dunmurry train bombing: An IRA bomb prematurely detonated on a passenger train near Belfast, killing three civilians and injuring five others.

== 1981 ==
- 6 February – Attacks on shipping in Lough Foyle (1981–82): The IRA bombed and sank the British coal ship the Nellie M. An estimated £1 million was lost from the cargo.
- 19 May – Bessbrook landmine attack: The Provisional IRA South Armagh Brigade killed five British soldiers in a landmine attack at Bessbrook, Armagh.
- 10 October – Chelsea Barracks bombing: Two civilians were killed and over 20 British soldiers were injured in an IRA bombing outside the Chelsea Barracks.
- 17 October – Lieutenant-general Sir Steuart Pringle was injured in an explosion at his home in Dulwich, London, by a car bomb planted by the IRA. He lost a leg in the bombing.
- 26 October – The IRA bombed a Wimpy bar on Oxford Street, killing Kenneth Howorth, the Metropolitan Police explosives officer attempting to defuse it.

== 1982 ==
- 23 February – Attacks on shipping in Lough Foyle (1981–82): The IRA sank the St. Bedan, a British coal ship at Lough Foyle.
- 20 July – Hyde Park and Regents Park bombings: 11 British soldiers and seven military horses died in IRA bomb attacks in Regent's Park and Hyde Park, London. Many spectators were badly injured.
- 16 September – 1982 Divis Flats bombing: the INLA detonated a remote-control bomb hidden in a drainpipe as a British patrol passed Cullingtree Walk, Divis Flats, Belfast. Three people were killed: a British soldier, Kevin Waller; and two Catholic children, Stephen Bennett and Kevin Valliday. Three others, including two more British soldiers and a Catholic civilian, were injured in the attack.
- 6 December – Droppin Well bombing: 11 British soldiers and six civilians were killed by an INLA bomb at the Droppin' Well Bar, County Londonderry.

== 1983 ==
- 10 December – 1983 Royal Artillery Barracks bombing: A bomb exploded at the Royal Artillery Barracks in Woolwich, South East London. The explosion injured five people and caused minor damage to the building. The IRA claimed they carried out the attack.
- 17 December – Harrods bombing: an IRA car bomb killed three policemen and three civilians, and injured ninety outside a department store in London.

== 1984 ==
- 12 October – Brighton hotel bombing: the IRA carried out a bomb attack on the Grand Brighton Hotel, which was being used as a base for the Conservative Party Conference. Five people, including MP Anthony Berry, were killed. Margaret and Denis Thatcher were at the scene but unharmed.

== 1985 ==
- 28 February – 1985 Newry mortar attack: an IRA mortar attack on the Newry RUC station killed nine officers and injured thirty-seven.
- 7 December – Attack on Ballygawley barracks: the IRA launched an assault on the RUC barracks in Ballygawley, County Tyrone. Two RUC officers were killed and the barracks was completely destroyed.

== 1986 ==
- 11 August – Attack on RUC Birches barracks: The East Tyrone Brigade destroyed the RUC barracks at The Birches with a 200 lb. bomb driven in a JCB digger, near Portadown.

== 1987 ==
- 8 November – Remembrance Day bombing: 11 civilians were killed and sixty-three injured by an IRA bomb during a Remembrance Day service in Enniskillen, County Fermanagh. One of those killed was Marie Wilson; in a BBC interview, her father Gordon (who was injured in the attack) expressed forgiveness towards his daughter's killer, and asked Loyalists not to seek revenge. He became a leading peace campaigner and was later elected to the Irish Senate. He died in 1995.

== 1988 ==
- 15 June – Lisburn van bombing: Six off-duty British soldiers were killed by an IRA bomb on their minibus in Lisburn.
- 20 August – Ballygawley bus bombing: eight British soldiers were killed and 28 wounded by an IRA roadside bomb near Ballygawley.

== 1989 ==
- 20 February – Clive Barracks bombing: The Clive Barracks were bombed by the IRA. Only 2 people were injured in the attack but a fair amount of structural damage was done.
- 22 September – Deal barracks bombing: Eleven Royal Marines bandsmen were killed by the IRA at Deal Barracks in Kent, England.

== 1990 ==
- 25 June – Carlton Club bombing: A bomb exploded at the Carlton Club in London, injuring 20 people. Donald Kaberry died of his injuries on 13 March 1991.
- 20 July – The IRA bombed the London Stock Exchange.
- 30 July – Conservative MP Ian Gow was killed by a car bomb outside his house near Eastbourne.
- 6 September – RFA Fort Victoria bombing: The IRA planted two bombs aboard the Royal Fleet Auxiliary replenishment ship RFA Fort Victoria. One of them exploded, disabling the ship that had been constructed in Belfast and launched some weeks before. The second bomb failed to go off and was found and defused 15 days later.
- 24 October – The IRA delivered three proxy bombs to British Army checkpoints. Three men (who were working with the British Army) were tied into cars loaded with explosives and ordered to drive to each checkpoint. Each bomb was remotely detonated. The first exploded at a checkpoint in Coshquin, killing the driver and five soldiers; the second exploded at a checkpoint in Killean, with the driver narrowly escaping and a soldier killed; and the third failed to detonate.

== 1991 ==
- 7 February – Downing Street mortar attack: The IRA launched a mortar attack on 10 Downing Street during a cabinet meeting with one mortar shell exploding in the garden, causing minor injuries to two people and two further shells landing nearby.
- 31 May – Glenanne barracks bombing: The IRA launched a large truck bomb attack on a UDR barracks in County Armagh. Three soldiers were killed, while ten soldiers and four civilians were wounded.

== 1992 ==
- 17 January – Teebane bombing: A 600 lb (270 kg) (1,500 lb (680 kg) per another source) roadside bomb detonated by the IRA destroyed a van and killed eight construction workers (one of them a Territorial Army soldier) on their way back from Lisanelly British Army barracks in Omagh, County Tyrone, where they were making repairs. Another eight were wounded.
- 10 April – Baltic Exchange bombing: A van loaded with one ton of home-made explosives went off outside the building of the Baltic Exchange company, at 30 St Mary Axe, London, killing three people and injuring another 91. The bomb caused £800 million worth of damage. Three hours later, a similar sized bomb exploded at the junction of the M1 and the North Circular Road at Staples Corner in north London, causing substantial damage but no injuries. Both bombs were placed in vans and were home-made rather than Semtex; each weighed several hundred pounds.
- 1 May – Attack on Cloghoge checkpoint: The IRA used a modified van that ran on railway tracks to launch an unconventional bomb attack on a British Army checkpoint in South Armagh. The checkpoint was obliterated when the 1,000 kg bomb exploded, killing one soldier and injuring 23.
- 12 May – 1992 Coalisland riots: After a small IRA bomb attack on a British Army patrol in the village of Cappagh, in which a paratrooper lost both legs, British soldiers raided two public houses and caused considerable damage in the nearby town of Coalisland. Five days later, the conflict became a fist-fight between soldiers and local inhabitants. Shortly thereafter, another group of British paratroopers arrived and fired on a crowd of civilians and injured seven. Two soldiers were hospitalized, communication equipment was shattered and a rifle and a GPMG were stolen.
- 19 September – Forensic Science Laboratory bombing: The IRA detonated a 3,700 lb bomb at the Northern Ireland forensic science laboratory in south Belfast. The laboratory was obliterated, 700 houses were damaged, and 20 people were injured. 490 owners and occupiers claimed damages.

== 1993 ==
- 20 March – Warrington bombings: after a vague telephoned warning, the IRA detonated two bombs in Cheshire, England. Two children were killed and 56 people were wounded. There were widespread protests in Britain and the Republic of Ireland following the deaths.
- 24 April – 1993 Bishopsgate bombing: After a telephoned warning, the IRA detonated a large bomb in Bishopsgate, London. It killed one civilian, wounded 30 others, and caused an estimated £350 million in damage.
- 2 October – 1993 Finchley Road bombings: Three IRA time bombs exploded on Finchley Road in north London.
- 23 October – Shankill Road bombing: eight civilians, one UDA member, and one IRA member were killed, and another IRA member was injured when an IRA bomb prematurely exploded at a fish shop on Shankill Road, Belfast.

== 1994 ==
- 9–13 March – Heathrow mortar attacks: On 9, 11, and 13 March, the IRA fired improvised mortar bombs on to the runway at Heathrow Airport. There were no deaths or injuries.

== 1996 ==
- 9 February – 1996 Docklands bombing: The bomb killed two civilians.
- 18 February – Aldwych bus bombing: Edward O'Brien, an IRA volunteer, died when an improvised explosive device he was carrying detonated prematurely on a number 171 bus in Aldwych, central London. The 2 kg semtex bomb detonated as he stood near the door of the bus. A pathologist found O'Brien was killed "virtually instantaneously", while other passengers and the driver (left permanently deaf) were injured in the explosion.
- 15 June – 1996 Manchester bombing: the IRA detonated a bomb in Manchester, England. It destroyed a large part of the city centre and injured over 200 people. To date, it is the largest bomb to be planted on the British mainland since World War II. Several buildings were damaged beyond repair and had to be demolished.
- 7 October – Thiepval barracks bombing: The IRA detonated two car bombs at the British Army headquarters in Thiepval Barracks, Lisburn. One soldier was killed and 31 injured.

== 1998 ==
- 1 August – 1998 Banbridge bombing: A dissident republican group calling itself the Real Irish Republican Army (RIRA) detonated a bomb in Banbridge, County Down, injuring 35 people and causing extensive damage.
- 15 August – Omagh bombing: the RIRA detonated a bomb in Omagh, County Tyrone. It killed 29 civilians.

== 1999 ==
- 15 March – Solicitor Rosemary Nelson, who had represented the Catholic and nationalist residents in the Drumcree conflict, was assassinated by a booby trapped car bomb in Lurgan, County Armagh. A loyalist group, Red Hand Defenders, claimed responsibility.

== 2001 ==
- 4 March – 2001 BBC bombing: Television Centre, causing some damage to the building.
- 3 August – 2001 Ealing bombing: an RIRA car bomb injured seven civilians in Ealing, west London.
- 3 November - 2001 Birmingham bombing: a RIRA car bomb partially exploded outside a night club near New Street Station in Birmingham.

== See also ==
- Directory of the Northern Ireland Troubles
- List of Irish police officers killed in the line of duty
- Operation Banner
