= Pub bombing =

Attack on a pub using explosives

A pub bombing or a public house bombing is an attack on a pub or public house using explosives and other bombing making material like nails, bolts, screws and similar objects which can cause horrific injuries when the bomb detonates. The Provisional IRA's Balcombe Street Gang used bolts and screws in many of their bomb attacks in the mid-1970s. Neo-nazi David Copeland used nails in his bombs.

== History ==
The vast majority of pub bombings were carried out during Northern Ireland's "Troubles" conflict. The attacks were carried out by Irish republican and Ulster loyalist paramilitary groups, such as the Republican Provisional Irish Republican Army (IRA), Irish National Liberation Army (INLA) and the Loyalist Ulster Volunteer Force (UVF) and Ulster Freedom Fighters (UFF). There were some pub bombings carried out by other European urban guerrilla movements around the same period.

One of the first pub bombings of the Troubles in Northern Ireland was the IRA bombing of the Bluebell Bar in the Sandy Row area of Belfast a staunchly loyalist, Protestant area of Belfast. Almost 30 people were injured in this bombing which occurred on the 20 September 1971. A few weeks later the Loyalists carried out their first pub bombing when the UVF bombed what they believed to be a Republican owned pub called the Fiddler's House Bar on the 9 October 1971, to were hoping to hurt Catholics but instead killed a middle aged Protestant women & injured several others.

The worst pub bombing in Northern Ireland happened early on in the conflict. The McGurk's Bar bombing which was carried out by the UVF claimed the lives of 15 civilians and 17 others were badly injured. At the time it was the highest death toll from any attack in the North, until the IRA's Warrenpoint ambush which killed 18 people in August 1979.

The worst pub bombing in the UK was the Birmingham pub bombings of the 21 November 1974. 21 people were killed and 182 others were injured many of the seriously. It was the IRA's deadliest attack of the conflict in terms of civilian deaths and it was the highest death toll from a pub bombing during the conflict.

The worst pub bombing attack in the Republic of Ireland during the conflict was the bombing at Kay's Tavern which occurred in Dundalk in County Louth. Two people were killed in this attack and 20 more injured. The Red Hand Commando, a UVF linked group, claimed they carried out the attack.

During the 1970s, loyalists stepped up their bombing campaign against pubs and it was said they were helped allegedly by the security forces, in an alliance of UVF, UDR, UDA, RUC, RUC Special Branch, RUC Special Patrol Group and a small number of British soldiers. Between 1973 and 1977 they bombed a long list of pubs and other places.

Journalist Anne Cadwallader described some of the attacks in the 1974–75 period as being "the height of their campaign" which also included not just bomb attacks but shootings as well, known as "spray jobs" in Northern Ireland. The group these people belonged to was the Glenanne gang.

- 1 – 17 January 1974: Daniel Hughes was shot dead in a UVF gun attack on Boyle's Bar, Cappagh.
- 2 – 14 February 1974: The Glenanne Gang attack Traynors bar.
- 3 – 29 November 1974 – A loyalist bomb explodes at a bar called Hughe's Bar in Newry, fatally injuring John Mallon, and in another bomb attack on McArdles Bar, near Crossmaglen injuring Thomas McNamme who died less than a year later.
- 4 – 10 February 1975 – The UVF attack Haydebs Bar and they killed Eugene Doyle and Arthur Mullholland.
- 5 – 27 April 1975 – a loyalist gang attacked Bleary Dart's club and kill three people, Joe Toman, Brendan O'Hara and John Feeney were all killed playing a game of darts.
- 6 – 4 September 1975 – The UVF attacked McCann's bar near Ballyagan killing Margaret Hale in the attack.
- 7 – 22 August 1975 – The UVF destroys the "McGleenan's Bar". Many were injured and some lost legs and limbs in the attack, John McGleenan, Patrick Hughes and Thomas Morris were all killed.
- 8 – 19 December 1976 – The UVF planted a car bomb outside a pub in Dundalk and it exploded killing 2 people and injured 22 others.
- 9 – 17 March 1976 – The UVF planted a large car bomb outside a bar called the Hillcrest Bar, on St. Patrick's Day. The UVF car bomb explodes, and killed Andrew Small, Patrick Baranard, Joe Kelly, James McChauey. Many more were injured.
- 10 – 16 August 1976 – The Step Inn pub in Keady, Armagh is bombed by members of the Glenanne gang, killing Betty McDonald and Gerard McGleenan.

== Notable pub bombings ==
Year	Event	Location	Perpetrator(s)	Deaths	Injuries	Comments
1971	Red Lion Pub bombing	Belfast, Northern Ireland	Provisional IRA	3	30	Part of IRA campaign
1971	McGurk's Bar bombing	Belfast, Northern Ireland	Ulster Volunteer Force	15	17	Part of UVF campaign
1972	Benny's Bar bombing	Belfast, Northern Ireland	Ulster Freedom Fighters	2	12	Part of UFF/UDA campaign
1974	Rose & Crown Bar bombing	Belfast, Northern Ireland	Ulster Volunteer Force	6	18	Part of UVF campaign
1974	Guildford pub bombings	Surrey, England	Provisional IRA	5	65	Part of IRA England campaign. First attack carried out by the IRA's Balcombe Street Gang between October 1974 - December 1975
1974	Woolwich pub bombing	London, England	Provisional IRA	2	40	Part of IRA England campaign
1974	Talbot Arms pub bombing	London, England	Provisional IRA	0	8	Part of IRA England campaign
1974	Birmingham pub bombings	Birmingham, England	Provisional IRA	21	182	Part of IRA England campaign
1975	Mountainview Tavern bombing 1975	Belfast, Northern Ireland	Provisional IRA	5	50 - 60	Part of IRA campaign
1975	1975 Conway's Bar attack	Belfast, Northern Ireland	Ulster Volunteer Force	2	15	Part of UVF campaign
1975	Bayardo Bar attack	Belfast, Northern Ireland	Provisional IRA	5	50 - 60	Part of IRA campaign
1975	Strand Bar bombing	Belfast, Northern Ireland	Ulster Volunteer Force	6	50	Part of UVF campaign
1975	Caterham Arms pub bombing	Surrey, England	Provisional IRA	0	33	Part of IRA England campaign
1975	Biddy Mulligan's pub bombing	London, England	Ulster Freedom Fighters	0	5	Part of UDA/UFF campaign
1975	Donnelly's Bar and Kay's Tavern attacks	Dundalk, Republic of Ireland	Ulster Volunteer Force	2	21	Part of UVF campaign (1st part of double attack)
1975	1975 Central Bar bombing	County Down, Northern Ireland	Irish National Liberation Army (INLA)	3	30	Carried out by INLA members using the covername "People's Republican Army"
1976	1976 Step Inn pub bombing	County Armagh, Northern Ireland	Ulster Volunteer Force	2	20	Part of UVF campaign. One of a number attacks carried out by the Glenanne Gang around the Irish border between 1972 - 1977
1976	Hillcrest Bar bombing	County Tyrone, Northern Ireland	Ulster Volunteer Force	4	50	Part of UVF campaign
1976	Castleblayney bombing	County Monaghan, Ireland	Ulster Volunteer Force	1	17	A car bomb exploded outside the Three Star Inn pub, Part UVF campaign
1979	Glasgow pub bombings	Glasgow, Scotland	Ulster Volunteer Force	0	8	Part of UVF campaign
1982	Droppin Well bombing	Ballykelly, County Londonderry, Northern Ireland	Irish National Liberation Army	17	30	Bombing against British soldiers
1992	Sussex Arms pub bombing	London, England	Provisional IRA	1	7	Part of IRA England campaign
1999	Nail bombing at Admiral Duncan	Soho, London, England	David Copeland	3	70	Neo-Nazi terrorist hate campaign, many people injured badly from shrapnel & nails, some lost limbs.
2003	Mike's Place suicide bombing	Tel Aviv, Israel	Hamas and Al Aqsa Martyrs Brigades affiliated British citizens	3	50	Part of Second Intifada

== See also ==
- Time bomb
