= List of terrorist incidents in 1974 =

This is a timeline of incidents in 1974 that have been labelled as "terrorism" and are not believed to have been carried out by a government or its forces (see state terrorism and state-sponsored terrorism).

== Guidelines ==
- To be included, entries must be notable (have a stand-alone article) and described by a consensus of reliable sources as "terrorism".
- List entries must comply with the guidelines outlined in the manual of style under MOS:TERRORIST.
- Casualties figures in this list are the total casualties of the incident including immediate casualties and later casualties (such as people who succumbed to their wounds long after the attacks occurred).
- Casualties listed are the victims. Perpetrator casualties are listed separately (e.g. x (+y) indicate that x victims and y perpetrators were killed/injured).
- Casualty totals may be underestimated or unavailable due to a lack of information. A figure with a plus (+) sign indicates that at least that many people have died (e.g. 10+ indicates that at least 10 people have died) – the actual toll could be considerably higher. A figure with a plus (+) sign may also indicate that over that number of people are victims.
- If casualty figures are 20 or more, they will be shown in **bold**. In addition, figures for casualties more than 50 will also be **underlined**.
- Incidents are limited to one per location per day. If multiple attacks occur in the same place on the same day, they will be merged into a single incident.
- In addition to the guidelines above, the table also includes the following categories:

0 people were killed/injured by the incident.
1–19 people were killed/injured by the incident.
20–49 people were killed/injured by the incident.
50–99 people were killed/injured by the incident.
100+ people were killed/injured by the incident.

== List ==
Date	Type	Dead	Injured	Location	Details	Perpetrator	Part of
January 31	Hostage-taking	0	0	Singapore/Kuwait	Laju incident: JRA–PFLP attack on a Shell facility in Singapore and the simultaneous seizure of the Japanese embassy in Kuwait.	Japanese Red Army; PFLP	
February 4	Bombing	12	39	West Riding of Yorkshire, United Kingdom	12 people (nine soldiers and three civilians) are killed by the IRA in the M62 coach bombing.	PIRA	The Troubles
April 11	Massacre	18 (+3)	15	Kiryat Shmona, Israel	Kiryat Shmona massacre: at an apartment building by the Popular Front for the Liberation of Palestine members, killing 18 people, nine of whom were children.	PFLP	Israeli–Palestinian conflict
May 2	Bombing	6	18	Belfast, Northern Ireland	The Loyalist paramilitary group the Ulster Volunteer Force detonated a bomb inside a Catholic owned bar, killing six people & injuring 18.	Ulster Volunteer Force	The Troubles
May 15	Massacre	31 (+3)	70	Ma'alot, Israel	Ma'alot massacre: at the Ma'alot High School by Popular Front for the Liberation of Palestine members: 26 hostages were killed, 66 wounded.	PFLP	Israeli–Palestinian conflict
May 17	Car bombings	35	300	Dublin and Monaghan, Ireland	Ulster Volunteer Force detonate three car bombs, killing 35 civilians, the deadliest toll of any one day in 'The Troubles'. It is suspected that the British security forces may have assisted the bombers to plan and carry out the attacks. The UK government have so far refused to release files about the bombings.	Ulster Volunteer Force	The Troubles
May 28	Bombing	8	102	Brescia, Italy	Piazza della Loggia bombing: Eight people are killed and at least 90 wounded when a bomb placed in a rubbish bin explodes.	Ordine Nuovo	
June 24–25	Shooting	4 (+3)	8	Nahariya, Israel	1974 Nahariya attack	Fatah	Israeli–Palestinian conflict
July 24	Shooting	13 or 15		Alaminos, Cyprus	Alaminos massacre: was a massacre of 13 or 15 Cypriot Turkish civilians in the village of Alaminos which happened on 20 July 1974.	EOKA-B	Atrocities against Turkish Cypriots
July 17	Bombing	1	41	London, England	The Provisional IRA carried out the 1974 Tower of London bombing killing one person and injuring 41 others.	Provisional Irish Republican Army	The Troubles
July 23	Attempted bombing	0	0	Manchester, United Kingdom	The Provisional IRA planted a bomb on a passenger airliner. They called The Irish News to issue a warning that the plane could blow up. The PIRA later said they never intended on blowing up the plane but wanted to prove they could smuggle a bomb onto a passenger plane.	PIRA	The Troubles
July 24	Torture murder	1	0	Belfast, United Kingdom	Ann Ogilby is tortured and murdered by two teenage girls from the Ulster Defence Association in retaliation for Ogilby having an affair with a married UDA commander.	Ulster Defence Association	The Troubles
August 4	Bombing	12	48	San Benedetto Val di Sambro, Italy	Italicus Express bombing: train between Rome and Brennero explodes, killing twelve and injuring 44.	Ordine Nero	
August 6	Bombing	3	36	Los Angeles, California, United States	The 1974 Los Angeles International Airport bombing occurred in the overseas passenger terminal lobby of Pan Am. The attack killed three people and injured 36 others.	Muharem Kurbegovic	
August 14	Shooting	126		Maratha, Santalaris, Aloda in Cyprus	Maratha, Santalaris and Aloda massacre	EOKA-B	Atrocities against Turkish Cypriots
August 14	Shooting	84		Tochni, Cyprus	Tochni massacre: refers to the killing of 84 Turkish Cypriots from the village of Tochni, Larnaca, Cyprus by Greek Cypriot members of EOKA B during the Turkish invasion of Cyprus in the summer of 1974.	EOKA-B	Atrocities against Turkish Cypriots
August 30	Bombing	8	378	Tokyo, Japan	1974 Mitsubishi Heavy Industries bombing: Powerful bomb explodes at the Mitsubishi Heavy Industries headquarters in Marunouchi. Eight killed, 378 injured. Eight left-wing activists are arrested May 19, 1975, by Japanese authorities.	East Asia Anti-Japan Armed Front	
September 8	Bombing	88	0	Ionian Sea, Greece	TWA Flight 841: Bomb kills 88 on jetliner. Attributed to Abu Nidal and his terrorist organization.	Abu Nidal Organization	Israeli–Palestinian conflict
September 13	Bombing	13	71	Madrid, Spain	Cafetería Rolando bombing Basque group ETA bombs the "Rolando" cafeteria and kills twelve people.	ETA	Basque conflict
September 13	Hostage-taking	0	1	The Hague, The Netherlands	1974 French Embassy attack in The Hague: Three members of the Japanese Red Army take hostages at the French embassy. They wound a Dutch policewoman. All hostages are released without harm in exchange for JRA prisoner being released.	Japanese Red Army	
September 15	Hijacking, bombing	75	0	Phan Rang, South Vietnam	Le Duc Tan, a South Vietnamese ranger who had recently had his position in the army demoted hijacked Air Vietnam Flight 706 and demanded to be flown to Hanoi. After the pilots refused to give in to his demands, Tan detonated grenades and caused the plane to crash, killing everyone on board.	Le Duc Tan	Vietnam War
October 5	Bombings	5	65	Guildford, United Kingdom	Guildford pub bombings: by the IRA leaves four off-duty soldiers and a civilian dead and 44 injured.	Republican Army	The Troubles
November 7	Bombing	2		Woolwich, United Kingdom	Bombing of the Kings Arms, Woolwich	Provisional IRA	The Troubles
November 19	Shooting	4 (+3 terrorists)	20+	Beit She'an, Israel	1974 Beit She'an attack	DFLP	Israeli–Palestinian conflict
November 21	Bombings	21	182	Birmingham, United Kingdom	Birmingham pub bombings by the IRA kills 21 people, injures 182.	Provisional IRA	The Troubles
November 25 - 27	1974 London pillar box bombings	0	40	London, United Kingdom	1974 London pillar box bombings by the IRA's Balcombe Street Gang injures 40 over the course of three days .	Provisional IRA	The Troubles
November 30	Talbot Arms pub bombing	0	8	London, United Kingdom	The Talbot Arms pub bombing by the IRA's Balcombe Street Gang a double attack with one of the bombs failing to explode, in total 8 people were injured.	Provisional IRA	The Troubles
December 19	Bombing, Car bomb	0	9	London, United Kingdom	The IRA exploded a car bomb outside Selfridges department store on Oxford Street. The bomb caused £1.5 million worth of damage. There was 100 lbs of high explosives in the car, the biggest bomb the IRA had used in England at that time.	Provisional IRA	The Troubles

== See also ==
- List of terrorist incidents
