= 1974 London bombing =

1974 London bombing may refer to:

- 1974 London pillar box bombings
- 1974 Chelsea bombing
- 1974 Houses of Parliament bombing
- 1974 Tower of London bombing
- Brook's Club bomb attack
- Harrow School bombing
- Oxford Street bombing
- Bombing of the Kings Arms, Woolwich
