= Hennessy (film) =

1975 British thriller film

- Directed by: Don Sharp
- Screenplay by: John Gay
- Story by: Richard Johnson
- Produced by: Peter Snell executive Samuel Z. Arkoff
- Starring: Rod Steiger; Lee Remick; Richard Johnson
- Cinematography: Ernest Steward
- Edited by: Eric Boyd-Perkins
- Music by: John Scott
- Production company: Hennessy Film Productions
- Distributed by: American International Pictures (US); CIC (UK)
- Release date: 31 July 1975 (US)
- Running time: 103 minutes
- Country: United Kingdom
- Language: English
- Budget: $1,400,000

Hennessy is a 1975 British thriller film directed by Don Sharp and starring Rod Steiger, Trevor Howard, Lee Remick, Richard Johnson, Peter Egan, Stanley Lebor, Patrick Stewart and a young Patsy Kensit, the last two in their film debuts.

== Plot ==
After the death of his family during a riot in Belfast, Niall Hennessy comes up with a plan to blow up the British Houses of Parliament.

== Cast ==
- Rod Steiger as Niall Hennessy
- Lee Remick as Kate Brooke
- Richard Johnson as Inspector Hollis
- Trevor Howard as Cmdr. Rice
- Peter Egan as Williams
- Eric Porter as Tobin
- Ian Hogg as Gerry
- Stanley Lebor as Hawk
- John Hallam as Boyle
- Patrick Stewart as Tilney
- David Collings as Covey
- John Shrapnel as Tipaldi
- Hugh Moxey as Stephen Burgess (M.P.)
- Margery Mason as Housekeeper
- Paul Brennan as Maguire
- Paul Blake as Rally Leader
- Patsy Kensit as Angie Hennessy

== Production ==
The film was based on a story by actor Richard Johnson who called it "a modern re-telling of the Guy Fawkes story. There is absolutely no question of anyone trying to make entertainment out of terror. That is ridiculous." Johnson was best known as an actor but he had a long history of writing.

"The film is not specifically orientated on politics," said Johnson. "It is simply a thriller using the Irish problem as a background."

The film was a co production between Peter Snell and American International Pictures (AIP). AIP sent a copy of a manuscript to John Gay who agreed to write the screenplay. The original director was John Guillermin and Gay says development involved three trips to London to confer with British Lion, who were co-producers, before the script was approved. Guillermin and Gay then flew to Italy to pitch the project to Rod Steiger, who was making a film about Mussolini. Steiger agreed to star.

Gay says that Guillermin then received an offer to direct The Towering Inferno so left the project. The film had no director for two months until the producers signed Don Sharp, then directing Callan.

Production started in February 1974 and finished in September. "It is not an agitational film," said Steiger. "This is a suspense thriller."

Since 1973 the IRA had undertaken a bombing campaign in England including the 1973 Old Bailey bombing, the Bombings of King's Cross and Euston stations, the 1973 Westminster bombing, the 1974 Houses of Parliament bombing, M62 coach bombing, 1974 Tower of London bombing, the Guildford pub bombings, the Birmingham pub bombings, and the Woolwich pub bombing. This was why the Sunday Mirror called Hennessy "the most controversial British film made in years." Sam Arkoff of AIP said "We do not consider this a pro-IRA movie but we are very anxious to avoid public opinion in Britain. I think the film is brilliant. I realise the bombing campaign in Britain must have made people very bitter about the IRA. I ask people to see the film before they make up their minds."

=== Footage of Queen Elizabeth ===
The film contained footage of Queen Elizabeth II speaking at the State Opening of Parliament and apparently reacting to something happening in the House of Lords, was taken in 1970. The clips were purchased by AIP from Movietone News and incorporated in the film. Johnson later said "We got permission before we even began filming. The film would not have been made as it has been made without it."

Buckingham Palace consented to use of the clip in the film but later said this was a misunderstanding as to the way the news footage would be used in the film and they would not do it again.

== Release ==
The British Board of Film Classification initially refused to classify the film because of the footage. Producer Samuel Z. Arkoff managed to get it passed by adding a disclaimer stating that the British royal family had not participated and footage of the Queen was from newsreel and by cutting a six-second sequence where the Queen appeared to react to the explosion.

The Rank Organisation then refused to screen the film in its Odeon Cinemas, citing commercial reasons. EMI also refused to distribute it, with Chairman Sir Bernard Delfont claiming it was too sympathetic to the IRA to be shown at that time. Critics such as Alexander Walker protested against this. Bernard Delfont wrote in his memoirs "at best, the film was guilty of poor taste; at worst, it invited retaliation in the courts. It also happened to be a very tedious movie which earned a thorough panning from critics when eventually it did secure release. This did not stop some of them from pointing the finger at me as the enemy of free speech."

As a result, the film was only shown at a small number of independent cinemas. However John Gay says it was financially successful. Richard Johnson said "people are going to see it, and I think that proves my point: controversy is the stuff of entertainment and there are enough moral watchdogs around already without everybody jumping in. Audiences want to be made to think, to react for or against something. No one wants to watch dull or boring films. There's no halfway mark with something like Hennessy. I just hope that those against it will be outnumbered by those who are for it."

=== Critical reception ===
The Guardian called it "quite a good thriller". The Los Angeles Times called it "routine but competent."
