= Talbot Arms pub bombing =

1974 bombing in England

Coordinates: 51.4993°N 0.1493°W

- Part of the Troubles
- Location: Little Chester Street, Belgravia London
- Date: 30 November 1974; 22:00 (UTC)
- Target: British establishment
- Attack type: 2 thrown bombs
- Deaths: 0
- Injuries: 8
- Perpetrator: Provisional Irish Republican Army

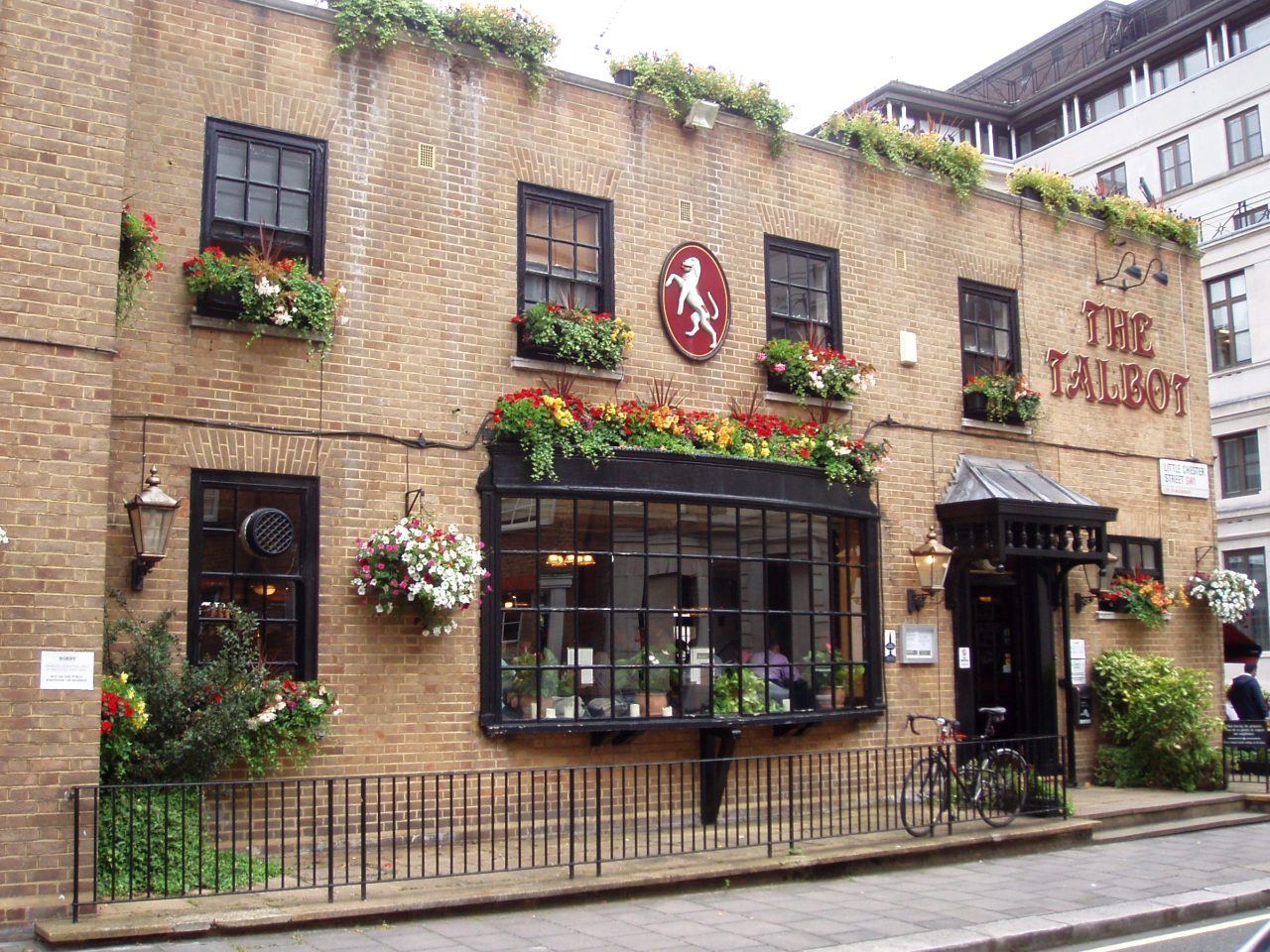
The Talbot Arms, Little Chester Street, as seen in 2008, renamed The Talbot

The Talbot Arms pub bombing took place on 30 November 1974, and was carried out by the Provisional Irish Republican Army (IRA). Eight people were injured in the attack, which involved the IRA throwing homemade bombs through the pub's window. Only one of the devices exploded; the other was taken as evidence and used to discover how the unit assembled its devices.

== Background ==
The attack came on the back of a string of IRA operations in England. The IRA had already carried out attacks on pubs in and around London, including in Guildford on 5 October—killing four off-duty soldiers and a civilian, and injuring 65 others—and on 7 November another off-duty soldier and a civilian were killed in the Woolwich pub bombing in which 35 people were also injured. The day before the Talbot Arms bombing, the British government had passed the Prevention of Terrorism Act. At the time described as “draconian”, it banned the IRA in Britain and gave the police unprecedented peacetime powers.

=== Location ===
The Talbot Arms pub has been described as then being a family friendly hostelry situated in Little Chester Street, a small mews in the upper-class area of Belgravia, Central London. It was, one recent commentator observed, "ideally situated" for the IRA's purposes, as it attracted "little or no passing traffic".

== Attack ==
The attack on the Talbot Arms pub happened at around 10:00pm on the night of 30 November 1974, when the pub had there were approximately 70 customers inside. An IRA volunteer threw a 2.5 pounds (1.1 kg) short-fused bomb, intending it to smash a window and detonate inside the pub; however, he misaimed and the device bounced off the window-frame, exploding outside. The bombs were wrapped in industrial tape and contained shrapnel composed of nuts and bolts packed around the gelignite, which was later found to be labelled Irish Industrial Limited Eversoft Frangex. Eight people were injured inside the pub, mainly from flying glass and debris. The sociologist Steven Moysey has suggested that, had the bomb exploded as intended, the result—a consequence of the shrapnel—would have been "carnage". A second bomb was then thrown, which succeeded in penetrating a pub window. This, however, failed to explode, and the Bomb Squad were later able to dismantle and forensically analyse it for clues. A joint investigation between the Metropolitan Police and the Royal Armament and Research Development Establishment deconstructed it and judged it to be a carbon copy of that used in the Woolwich bombing three weeks earlier. It was considered the biggest breakthrough the police had enjoyed up until then. The day after the bombing, Special Branch detained a number of suspects, although these were to have, commented McKee and Franey, "no effect at all" on the IRA's campaign.

== Later events ==
The attack on the Talbot Arms was followed by further attacks with throwing-bombs; a month later, only about 200 yards (180 m) around the corner from the pub, in Wilton Street, the IRA attempted to bomb the London flat of Prime Minister, Edward Heath, but missed him by 10 minutes. By August the following year the IRA had returned to the tactic of time bomb rather than manually throwing devices as at the Talbot Arms attack—when they bombed the Caterham Arms pub. Although many senior Sinn Féin men and republican symapthisers were arrested under the PTA following the attack on the Talbot Arms, Moysey has noted that "the ASU, safe in their anonymity, had no such concern", and continued their planned campaign.

== See also ==
- Glasgow pub bombings
- Biddy Mulligan's pub bombing
- Provisional Irish Republican Army campaign 1969–1997
