= Aldwych bus bombing =

1996 IRA attack in London, England

Coordinates: 51.5119°N 0.1190°W

- Part of the Troubles
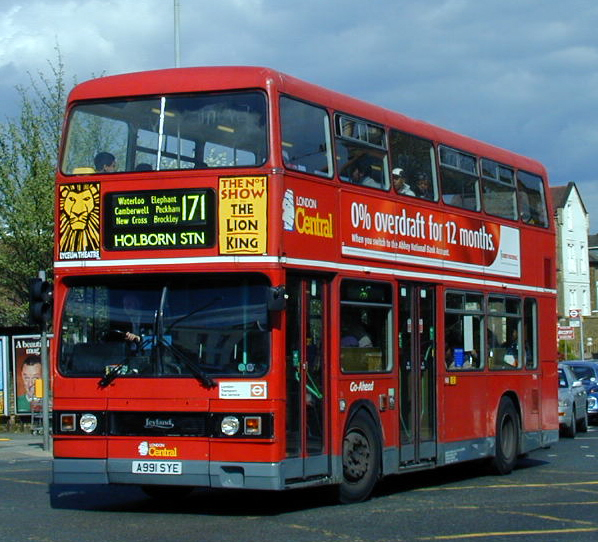
- A Leyland Titan double-decker bus identical to the one bombed.
- Location: Aldwych, London, United Kingdom
- Date: 18 February 1996; 22:38 (UTC)
- Attack type: Bombing
- Weapon: Improvised explosive device
- Deaths: 1 (the perpetrator)
- Injuries: 8
- Perpetrator: Provisional Irish Republican Army
- Assailant: Edward O'Brien

The Aldwych bus bombing occurred on 18 February 1996 in Aldwych, central London, England. Provisional Irish Republican Army (IRA) volunteer Edward O'Brien was carrying a bomb on a bus when it detonated prematurely, killing him and injuring eight other people.

== Background ==
The bus bombing occurred nine days after the Docklands bombing in east London, which marked the end of the IRA's ceasefire and the resumption of its armed campaign in England. On 16 February, an IRA bomb planted in a telephone box on Charing Cross Road, near Leicester Square tube station, was destroyed by a Metropolitan Police remote-controlled robot after a telephone warning.

=== Edward O'Brien ===
Edward O'Brien (18 September 1974 – 18 February 1996) was a Provisional Irish Republican Army (IRA) volunteer. He died in the bombing when the device he was carrying exploded prematurely. O'Brien grew up in Gorey, County Wexford, with his parents and two siblings. As a child he attended the local national and secondary schools. He was involved in several sports and was a member of St Enda's GAA Club where he played football and hurling. He also played for Gorey Rangers soccer club and was involved in boxing. He worked in a bakery.

O'Brien joined the IRA in 1992. He went to England to engage in paramilitary activity in an active service unit. Documents later recovered from O'Brien's residence indicated he was working for the IRA in Britain as early as August 1994, collecting information on targets, and assembling bomb-making equipment during a seventeen-month ceasefire. O'Brien may have been responsible for planting a bomb in a London telephone box on 15 February 1996 that was later deactivated by the police.

O'Brien's remains were buried in St Michael's Cemetery in Gorey.

== Bombing ==
At 10:38 pm on 18 February 1996, an improvised explosive device being carried by O'Brien detonated prematurely on a London Central Leyland Titan double-decker bus operating on route 171 in Aldwych, in the West End of London, England. The bus was travelling from Catford to Holborn with ten people on board. Police reported that O'Brien was sitting in the middle of lower floor of the bus when the 2 kg (4 lb) Semtex bomb detonated in his lap.

The bomb killed O'Brien instantly and injured people both inside and outside the bus, including London Central bus driver Robert Newitt, who was permanently deafened. The victims were brought to St Thomas's Hospital and University College Hospital. Three of them were in two cars in front of the bus at the time. The blast could be heard five miles away. Police said they received no warning about the bomb. The attack forced the closure of Charing Cross railway station.

== Investigation ==
It was initially reported by some media that three people were killed, but it then became clear that only the perpetrator was killed.

A police search of O'Brien's London address discovered 15 kilograms (30 lb) of Semtex, 20 timers, four detonators, an incendiary device, and ammunition for a 9 mm Walther revolver. The Walther pistol was discovered on him after his death. The police said they were also almost certain that O'Brien was the person who planted the telephone box bomb three days before the bus bombing.

Another Irishman, Brendan Woolhead, who was in the area at the time of the explosion and suffered a fractured skull, was briefly accused of involvement. His name was cleared and he was awarded around £200,000 in damages for libel. Woolhead died in October 1996 due to drug detoxification treatment for heroin addiction.

== Later events ==
In February 2021, in Dáil Éireann, the Tánaiste criticised Sinn Féin for organising a commemoration for O'Brien. The commemoration was organised by Wexford Sinn Féin councillor Fionntán Ó Súilleabháin, and was cancelled on 19 February 2021, "at the request of the family, due to significant online abuse targeting the family".

== See also ==
- 7 July 2005 London bombings
- List of bombings during the Troubles
