= 1974 Beit She'an attack =

Terrorist incident in Israel

Coordinates: 32.4917°N 35.4958°E

- The attack site
- Native name: הפיגוע בבית שאן (1974)
- Location: Beit She'an, Israel
- Date: 19 November 1974; 51 years ago
- Attack type: Mass shooting, kidnapping
- Weapons: AK-47 rifles, grenades, bombs and axes
- Deaths: 4 Israeli civilians (+3 Palestinian attackers)
- Injuries: 20+ Israeli civilians
- Perpetrator: Democratic Front for the Liberation of Palestine

The 1974 Beit She'an attack, which took place during 19 November 1974, was a raid by a squad of three Palestinian militants, belonging to the Democratic Front for the Liberation of Palestine militant organization, on the Israeli city of Beit She'an.

Four civilians were killed during the event and more than 20 civilians were injured. The three attackers were killed by responding Israeli special forces. The incident became notorious after an enraged mob of Israeli civilians that the army and police failed to control burned the bodies of the militants.

== The attack ==
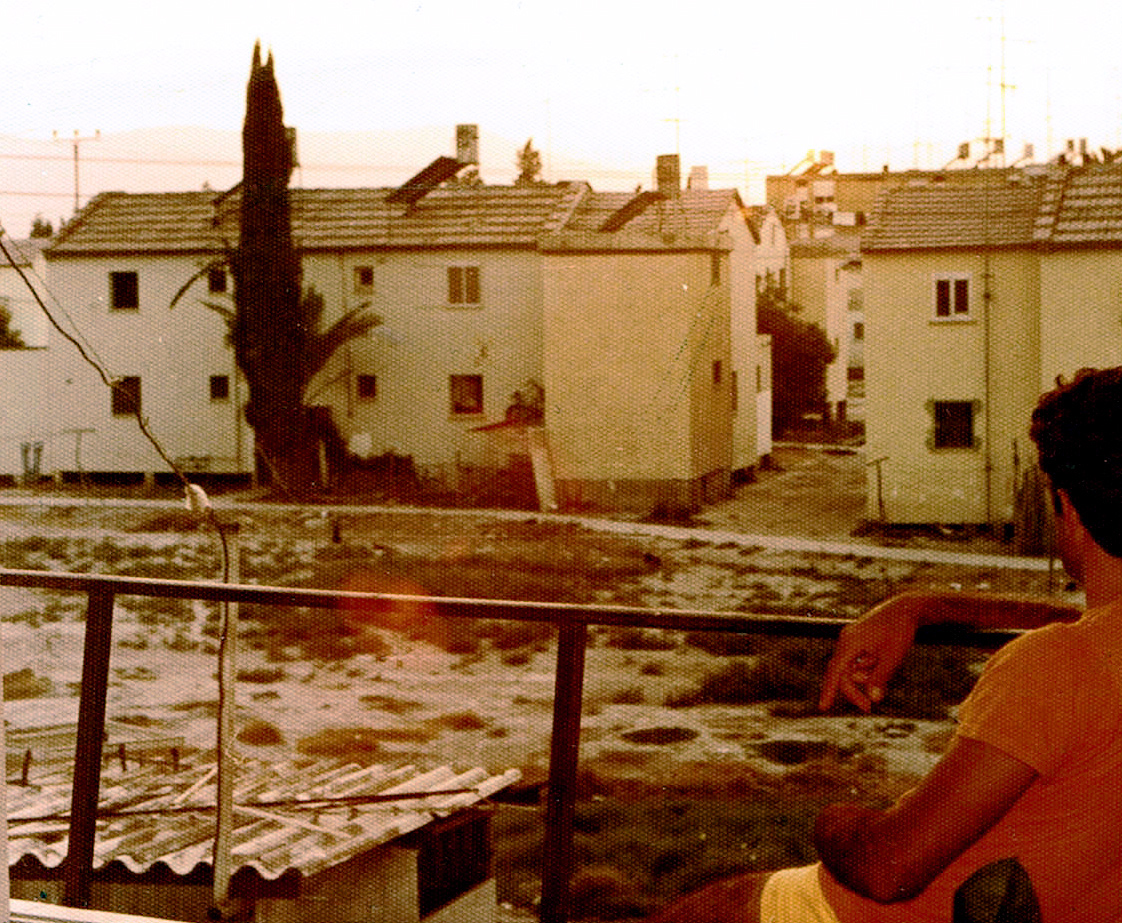
Typical neighborhood in Beit She'an during the late 1970s

On Tuesday, 19 November 1974, three Palestinian militants infiltrated into Israel from Jordan disguised as laborers. The militant squad arrived at the town of Beit She'an in northern Israel and entered a 4-storey building in the Eliyahu neighborhood. The militants were equipped with AK-47 rifles, grenades, bombs, axes, as well as a loudspeaker and leaflets for negotiations with the Israeli security forces.

Initially the militants fired through the apartment doors hitting Mazal Edry, who died later of her wounds in the stairwell. Then the squad broke into the apartment of the Bibas family who lived on the third floor. After murdering the mother of the family, they threw grenades from the windows, demanding the release of their comrades from Israeli prisons. During the event, the three children of the Bibas family, jumped out of the apartment from their third-floor window, suffering only light injuries. Jean Pierre Alimi, a resident of the neighborhood, was killed by the militants while he helped evacuate the wounded.

The people evacuated from the building alerted the Border Police who soon afterwards surrounded the building. An attempt was made to negotiate with the militants. The IDF sent a team from the elite Sayeret Matkal special forces unit, which included Muki Betser, Shay Avital, and Nehemiah Tamari. After negotiations failed, the Sayeret Matkal team broke into the building, and killed the three militants in an exchange of fire. During the exchange of fire, the father of the Bibas family was killed.

During the entire event some 20 Israeli civilians were injured, many of them children whom jumped out of their apartment windows to save their lives.

=== Fatalities ===
- Mazal Edry, 42, of Beit She'an
- Jean Pierre Alimi, 37, of Beit She'an
- Zohar Bibas, 53, of Beit She'an
- Yehuda Bibas, 53, of Beit She'an

== The perpetrators ==
After the attack the Palestinian militant organization Democratic Front for the Liberation of Palestine claimed responsibility for the attack. Prior to this attack the organization performed several major attacks against Israeli targets, including: the Avivim school bus massacre carried out on 22 May 1970, and the Ma'alot massacre carried out on 15 May 1974.

== Aftermath ==
After the militants were killed, a large crowd of locals gathered around the building. The police and IDF forces at the site failed to stop them as the angry residents entered the apartment and threw the bodies of the militants out the window. The angry mob poured petrol on the bodies and torched them. The body of one of the victims was accidentally lit as well. The maltreatment of the militants bodies was later on condemned by the Minister Shimon Peres and Rabbi Shlomo Goren who participated in the funerals of the victims.

Years after the event an avenue in Beit She'an was named "Shderat HaArba'ah" ("The Avenue of the Four") in memory of the victims of the attack. A synagogue was also built in Beit She'an named (Hebrew: היכל הארבעה, romanized: Heikhal ha HaArba'ah, lit. 'Hall of the Four') in memory of the victims.

== See also ==
- 2002 Beit She'an attack
- List of terrorist incidents, 1974
