= Caterham Barracks =

Military installation in Surrey, England

- Caterham
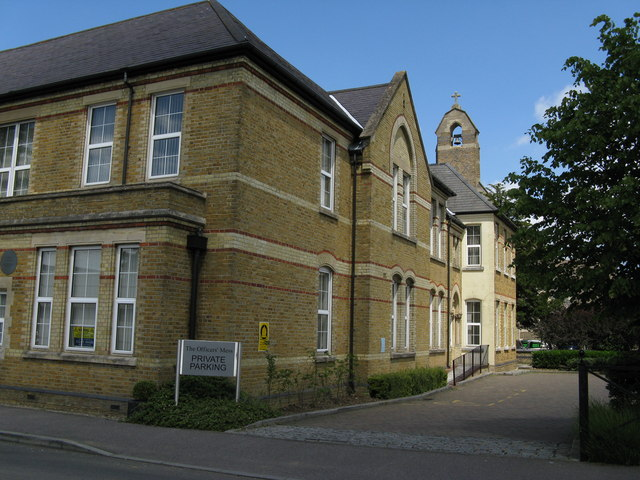
- The officers' mess at Caterham Barracks

Site information
- Type: Barracks
- Owner: Ministry of Defence
- Operator: British Army

Location
- Location within Surrey
- Coordinates: 51.288889°N 0.102222°W

Site history
- Built: 1877
- Built for: War Office
- In use: 1877-1995

Caterham Barracks was a military installation in Caterham, Surrey.

== History ==
The barracks were built as a depot for the Foot Guards regiments in 1877. The construction reflected a more humane style of barrack design in the aftermath of the Crimean War; the barrack blocks included better sanitation as well as cross-ventilation and cross-lighting of sleeping facilities for the first time. A local public house (the Caterham Arms) which was frequented by soldiers was targeted by the IRA with a bomb injuring 23 civilians and 10 off-duty soldiers in August 1975. The barracks were closed in 1995 and the site was redeveloped for housing using urban village principles after planning consent was given in June 1990.
