= Strand Bar bombing =

1975 Northern Ireland pub bombing

- Part of the Troubles
- Location: Anderson Street, Short Strand, Belfast
- Date: 12 April 1975; 8:12 pm
- Target: Catholics
- Attack type: Improvised bombing, shooting
- Deaths: 6
- Injuries: ~50
- Perpetrator: Red Hand Commando

The Strand Bar Bombing was a bomb attack on a pub in Belfast, Northern Ireland on 12 April 1975, during the Troubles. The Red Hand Commando (RHC), a loyalist paramilitary group, threw an improvised bomb into a pub frequented by Catholics in the Short Strand neighbourhood, killing six civilians and injuring about fifty others. It took place during a spate of tit-for-tat attacks by loyalists and Irish republican paramilitaries.

== Background ==
In February 1975, the Provisional Irish Republican Army (IRA) and British government entered into a truce and restarted negotiations. The IRA agreed to halt attacks on the British security forces, and the security forces mostly ended their raids and searches. There was a rise in sectarian killings during the truce, however Loyalists, fearing they were about to be forsaken by the British government and forced into a united Ireland, so the UVF, UDA & RHC all increased their attacks on Catholics and Irish nationalists including carrying out more Pub bombings. They hoped to force the IRA to retaliate and thus end the truce.

On 5 April, a week before the Strand Bar attack, the UVF bombed McLaughlin's Bar, killing two Catholic civilians. In retaliation, republicans bombed the Mountainview Tavern later that day, killing five Protestants using the name Republican Action Force.

== Bombing ==
The Strand Bar was in the Short Strand, a small Catholic enclave in the mainly-Protestant East Belfast. At 8:12pm on 12 April, RHC members threw an improvised bomb into the crowded pub. They stuck a wooden plank through the door handle to prevent anyone escaping, and witnesses said the bombers laughed and jeered as they did so, before speeding off in a car. One man threw a stool through the glass door of the pub but was unable to escape before the bomb exploded. The blast killed four women and one man outright, and another man died of his wounds a week later.

=== Victims ===
The victims were all local Catholic civilians: Mary McAleavy (57), Elizabeth Carson (64), Marie Bennett (42), Agnes McAnoy (62), Arthur Penn (32) and Michael Mulligan (33). Mary McAleavey was a mother to 11 children, Marie Bennett left behind seven children and Arthur Penn was a father of three children, Elizabeth Carson's husband William Carson lost an arm in the blast.

== Aftermath ==
Twenty minutes later, Protestant civilian Stafford Mateer was driving his car nearby when he was shot in an apparent revenge attack. He died of his wounds two days later.

The bombing was claimed by the "Ulster Young Militants", a name used by the Ulster Defence Association (UDA). However, in September 1975, a 31-year-old RHC member was charged with the murders. As he sat in the dock during one hearing, the teenage son of one of the victims "walked up to him and punched him in the face". The teenager was arrested and the magistrate fined him £10. During the trial, the prosecution relied heavily on the evidence of a witness referred to as 'Mr X', who claimed to have seen the accused driving the bombers' getaway car. The RHC member was acquitted of murder, the judge saying that "the certainty required for conviction is missing".

== See also ==
- McGurk's Bar bombing
- Rose & Crown Bar bombing
- Red Hand Commando
