= Glasgow pub bombings =

1979 terrorist attack in Glasgow, Scotland

- Part of the Troubles
- Location: Glasgow, Scotland
- Date: 17 February 1979; 9.50 pm & 10.05 pm (UTC)
- Target: Irish Catholics
- Attack type: Bomb
- Deaths: 0
- Injuries: 5
- Perpetrator: Ulster Volunteer Force (UVF)

The Glasgow pub bombings were two bomb attacks in Glasgow, Scotland, carried out by the Ulster Volunteer Force (UVF) on 17 February 1979. The UVF bombed two pubs frequented by Catholics: the Old Barns in Calton and, 15 minutes later, the Clelland Bar in Gorbals. Five people were injured, all at the Clelland Bar. The pubs were targeted because they were allegedly used for fundraising for Irish republicans in Northern Ireland. The attack sparked fears that sectarian violence would erupt in Scotland as a spillover of the Troubles. Experts believe a Provisional Irish Republican Army (IRA) veto on bombing operations in Scotland prevented the situation from escalating because the country was a centre of IRA support in terms of fundraising, safe houses, and gun-running.

The attacks were co-ordinated by William "Big Bill" Campbell, the UVF's top commander in Scotland, who was possibly involved with the 1971 McGurk's Bar bombing in Belfast which killed 15 people according to a book published in 2012. A police investigation led to Campbell, along with eight other UVF members (which included Angus McKenna), to be sentenced at Glasgow High Court in June 1979 and jailed. Campbell received a 16-year sentence for the pub bombings as well as criminal conspiracy related to firearms and explosives. The investigation was said to have wiped out the UVF's Scotland cell; however, the Northern Ireland Affairs Select Committee said in its report that "in 1992 it was estimated that Scottish support for the UDA and UVF might amount to £100,000 a year."

In 1995 his nephew Jason Campbell murdered a 16-year-old Celtic F.C. supporter in Bridgeton, Glasgow. He was jailed until released on parole in 2011. William Campbell died of natural causes in 1997 and received a funeral in his native Bridgeton, a loyalist stronghold, with thousands in attendance.

== See also ==
- Sectarianism in Glasgow
- Biddy Mulligan's pub bombing
- McGurk's Bar bombing
- Birmingham pub bombings
- Strand Bar bombing
