= RFA Fort Victoria bombing =

IRA bomb attack on RFA Fort Victoria

- Part of The Troubles
- RFA Fort Victoria

- Location: 54°37′07.38″N 5°53′42.24″W; Harland & Wolff shipyard, Port of Belfast
- Date: 6 September 1990
- Target: RFA Fort Victoria (A387)
- Weapon: 2 explosive charges
- Deaths: None
- Injuries: None
- Perpetrator: Provisional Irish Republican Army

The bombing of RFA Fort Victoria took place on 6 September 1990, when a unit of the Provisional Irish Republican Army (IRA) planted two bombs aboard the Royal Fleet Auxiliary replenishment ship at Harland & Wolff shipyard in Belfast, Northern Ireland, where the vessel had been launched four months before. One of them exploded in the engine room, causing flooding and serious damage. The second device didn't explode and was defused several days later. The attack resulted in a two-year delay before Fort Victoria became fully operational.

== Early IRA actions against shipping ==
One of the first IRA attacks on British ships since the Irish War of Independence was carried out against the Royal Navy fast-attack patrol boat HMS Brave Borderer, which was damaged by gunfire from a Boys anti-tank rifle in September 1965 while paying a visit to Waterford, Republic of Ireland. Another noteworthy operation against a British ship took place in April 1971, when the Royal Navy motorboat Stork was towed outside the port and blown up by the IRA off Baltimore, also in the Republic.

In Northern Ireland itself, two civilian coal ships, Nellie M and St Bedan, were boarded, bombed and sunk by the Provisional IRA between 1981 and 1982 in Lough Foyle.

== Provisional IRA attack ==
Fort Victoria is a 31,565 ton fleet stores ship and tanker of the Royal Fleet Auxiliary which had been ordered from Harland & Wolff on 24 April 1986, and eventually launched on 4 May 1990. The name of Fort Victoria was officially bestowed by the Duchess of York, on 19 June.

On 6 September 1990, while at dock and less than three months after being christened, a Provisional IRA unit planted two explosive devices on board. After a telephone warning from the IRA, one of the bombs exploded, causing extensive damage inside the engine room, which was holed and subsequently flooded. The ship listed 45 degrees, and the chances of sinking were high. The situation was under control after hours of work by emergency teams, which pumped the water out of the engine room. John Parker, chairman and chief executive of Harland and Wolff, praised the courage of the engineers for saving the ship. It was not learned that a second device had failed to explode until a second IRA phone call 24 hours later. It took two weeks to find and disable the second bomb, which stalled the works further.

== Aftermath ==
Fort Victoria eventually sailed from Belfast for sea trials on 29 June 1992, two years later than initially scheduled. Some politicians claimed that the attack was aimed at the personnel of the shipyard. Irish republican newspaper An Phoblacht called this "nonsense". It added: "The logic of their argument would dictate that any military action by any army anywhere is unjustified because civilian workers were involved in the construction of the enemy's machinery. This was an attack on a prestigious piece of British military hardware". The same source claimed that the total cost of the auxiliary ship was £130 million and that the operation showed the ability of the IRA to keep up its pressure on British forces. The IRA statement remarked: "We will not accept a colonial power adding insult to injury to the Irish people in occupied Ireland by using the Six Counties for con[s]tructing military machiner[y]." Democratic Unionist Party general secretary and MP Peter Robinson called for vetting of shipyard employees.

The attack and other problems with the construction of the vessel meant it was not delivered until 1993, three years after originally planned. The final cost of the ship, according to parliamentary sources, was £190 million, £63 million higher than the 1986 estimates.
