= London Buses route 171 =

London bus route

171
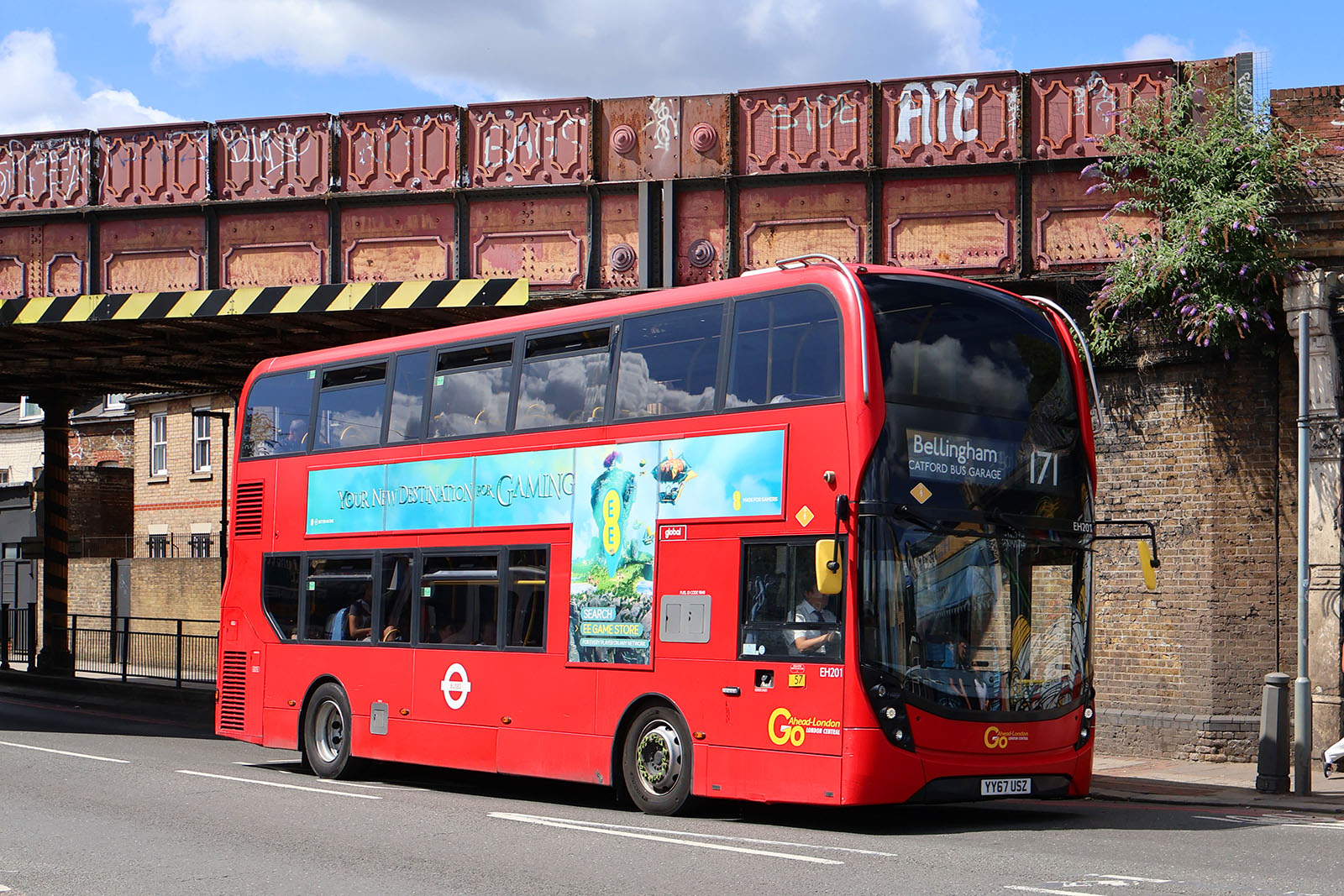
- London Central Alexander Dennis Enviro400H MMC in Catford in August 2023

Overview
- Operator: London Central (Go-Ahead London)
- Garage: New Cross

Route
- Start: Elephant and Castle
- Via: Peckham; New Cross; Brockley; Catford
- End: Catford bus garage

London Buses route 171 is a Transport for London contracted bus route in London, England. Running between Elephant and Castle and Catford bus garage, it is operated by Go-Ahead London subsidiary London Central.

== History ==
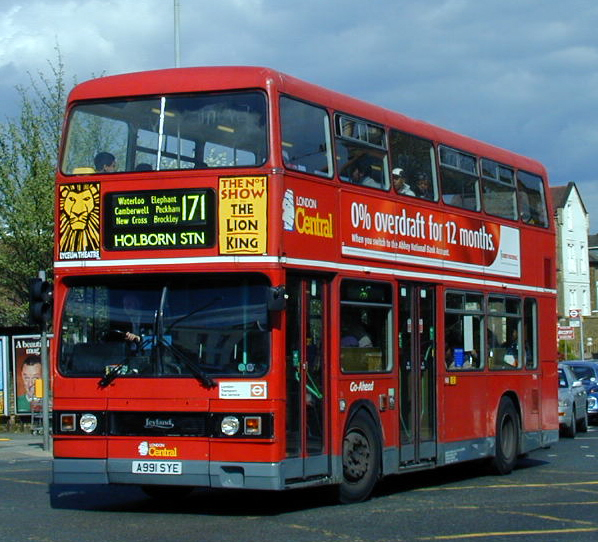
London Central Leyland Titan in Forest Hill in May 2001

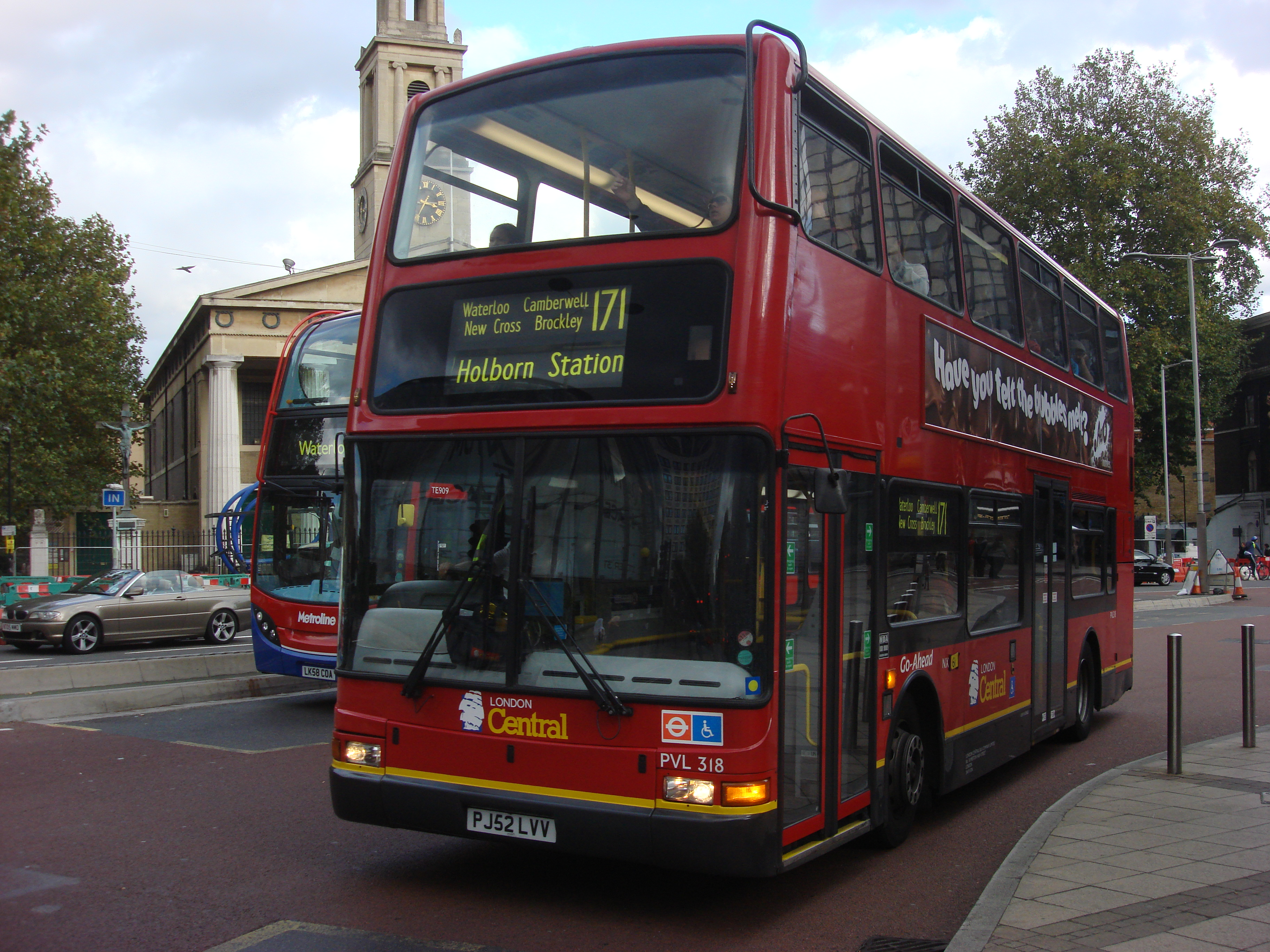
London Central Plaxton President bodied Volvo B7TL outside St John's Church, Waterloo in October 2008

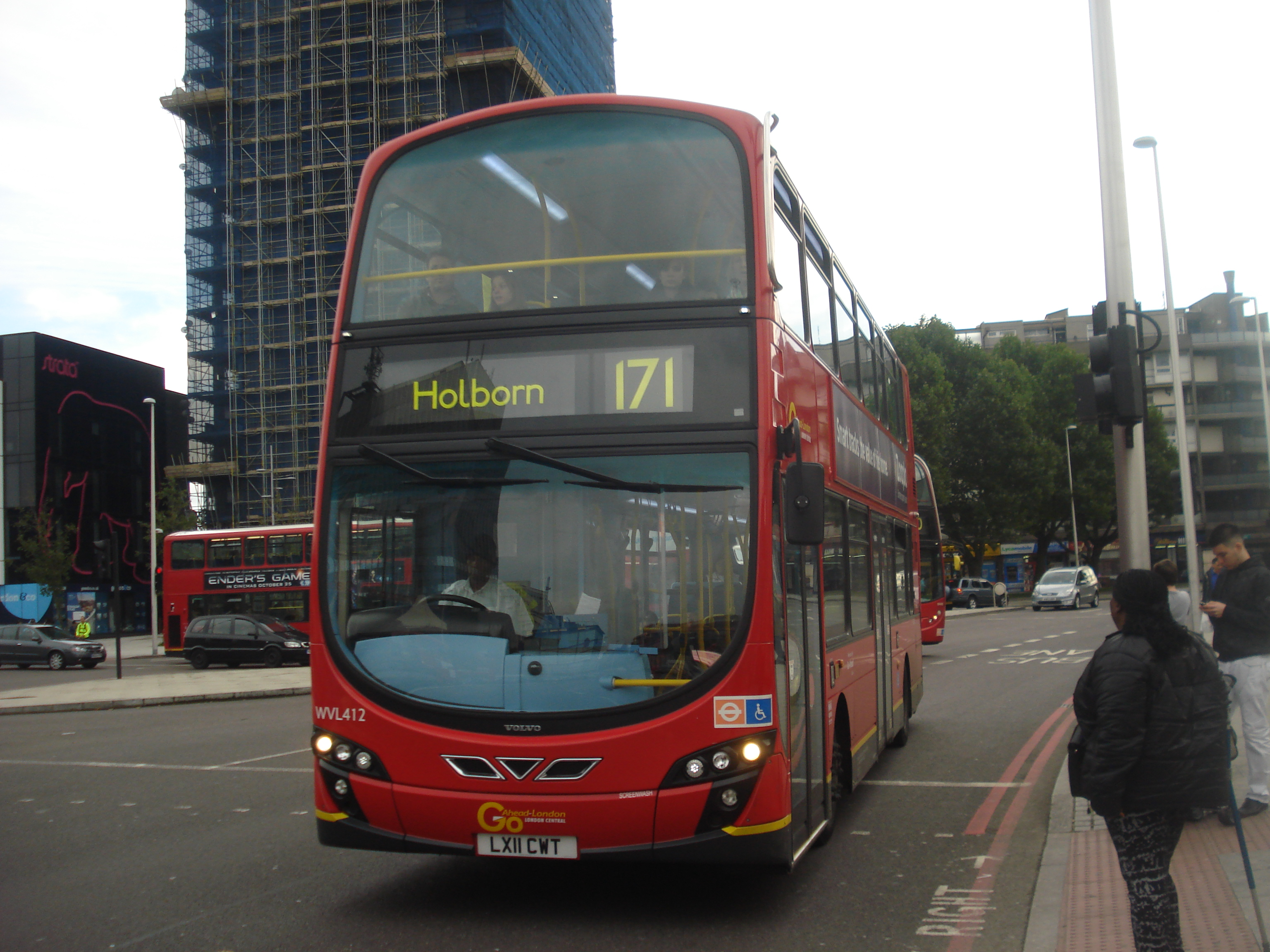
Go-Ahead London Wright Eclipse Gemini 2 bodied Volvo B9TL in Elephant and Castle in October 2013

=== 1952-1972 ===
Route 171 began operating on 6 April 1952 at Stage 7 of London Transport's post-war "Tram to Buses" conversion scheme to replace Kingsway Subway tram route 33. It ran as a daily service between Tottenham and West Norwood via Harringay, Manor House, Newington Green, Angel, Rosebery Avenue, Kingsway, Aldwych, Victoria Embankment, Westminster Bridge, Kennington, Brixton, West Norwood (Thurlow Arms) extended Sunday to West Norwood garage). The section between Harringay and Tottenham was new territory, not previously served by London buses.

=== 1973-present ===
On 18 February 1996, IRA member Edward O'Brien was killed when an improvised explosive device detonated prematurely on the route 171 bus he brought it onto as it was travelling along Aldwych towards King's Cross. It also injured eight other passengers.

Upon being re-tendered, it was retained by London Central with a new contract commencing on 29 April 2006. Go-Ahead London successfully tendered to retain the route with a new contract commencing on 30 April 2011.

== Current route ==
Route 171 operates via these primary locations:

- Elephant & Castle station
- Walworth
- Camberwell Green
- Peckham High Street
- Queens Road Peckham station
- New Cross Gate station
- Brockley station
- Crofton Park station
- Honor Oak
- Catford and Catford Bridge stations
- Catford bus garage
