= Chelsea Barracks bombing =

1981 IRA attack in London, England

- Part of the Troubles
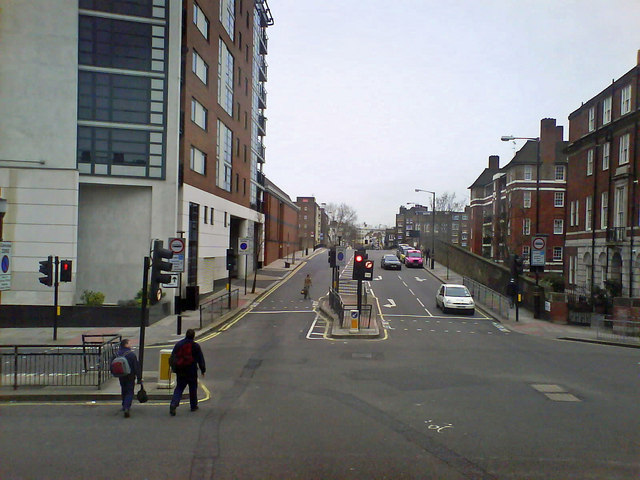
- Junction of Ebury Bridge Road, close to the bomb's location
- Location: 51°29′22″N 0°09′01″W; Belgravia, City of Westminster, London
- Date: 10 October 1981; 12:00 (GMT)
- Target: Irish Guards
- Attack type: Nail bomb IED
- Deaths: 2 civilians
- Injuries: 40 (23 soldiers)
- Perpetrator: Provisional IRA

The Chelsea Barracks bombing was an attack carried out by a London-based Active Service Unit (ASU) of the Provisional IRA on 10 October 1981, using a remote-controlled nail bomb. The bomb targeted a bus carrying British Army soldiers just outside Chelsea Barracks. The blast killed two civilians and injured 40 people, among them 23 soldiers.

== Background ==
In early October 1981, the Irish hunger strike, in which ten Irish Republican prisoners died, had just come to an end. The strike, started by Bobby Sands, was an attempt by the prisoners to have their political status reinstated. During the strike, Sands and another IRA volunteer, Kieran Doherty, were elected to the British and Irish parliaments respectively. The IRA resolved that action should be taken against the British Army or British Government to match the sacrifice made by the strikers.

== Bombing ==
An IRA Active Service Unit (ASU) in London decided to target members of the British Army Irish Guards regiment and planned to bomb two bus loads of guards on 10 October, as they were entering Chelsea Barracks. The device, believed to be a remote-controlled bomb, was hidden in a laundry van near the barracks, close to the junction of Ebury Bridge Road and St. Barnabas Street.

The bomb was detonated as a single bus passed, carrying 23 Irish Guards. Two other bus loads of Irish Guards were travelling a few minutes behind the one that was hit, so it seems that the bombers missed their main target. Two civilians, Nora Field, 59 and John Breslin, 18, were killed in the blast, and 40 people were injured, 23 of them soldiers, eight of whom received severe injuries. It was the worst attack carried out by the IRA in England since the London Hilton bombing, which killed two civilians and injured over 60 others.

== Aftermath ==
The IRA said in a statement the day after the bombing from Dublin that "the attack was aimed at a party of British soldiers". The statement added:

The attack is attributable to the state of war which exists between the British government who occupy Northern Ireland and the oppressed Irish people who strike out through the Irish Republican Army. We await the hypocrisy which will undoubtedly follow from British political leaders whose attitude to Irish victims of their violence in our country only strengthens our conviction in our cause and methods.

The IRA continued bombing targets in England. A week after the Chelsea bombing, the IRA seriously injured Lieutenant-General Sir Steuart Pringle when a booby-trap bomb exploded under his car. Pringle survived his injuries but lost his right leg. On 26 October 1981, Kenneth Howorth, a police explosives officer, was killed trying to defuse an IRA bomb placed in a Wimpy Bar in Oxford Street, London. A month later on 23 November 1981 a bomb exploded at the Royal Artillery Barracks in Woolwich injuring two people.

A year later, on 20 July 1982, two bombs killed 11 British soldiers, and injured 50 soldiers and civilians, during the Hyde Park and Regent's Park bombings. This was the deadliest IRA attack against the British Army in England during The Troubles. In December 1983, six people were killed and 90 injured in London when an IRA car bomb exploded outside Harrods department store. The IRA's most notable attack in Britain during that period occurred in Brighton in October 1984, when five people were killed and dozens injured in the Brighton hotel bombing, which was an attempt to kill British Prime Minister Margaret Thatcher.

=== Convictions ===
In 1986, Paul Kavanagh and Thomas Quigley, then aged 29, were given life sentences for the bombing in Chelsea, as well as the booby-trap bomb in Oxford Street. They were released in 1999 after the Good Friday Agreement.

== INLA bombing attempt ==
Four years after the Chelsea Barracks bombing, on 11 November 1985, the Irish Republican Revolutionary Socialist paramilitary organization the Irish National Liberation Army (INLA) again attempted to bomb Chelsea Barracks. An INLA unit placed three bombs right outside the barracks, each weighing about 12.5 pounds (5.7 kg). They were packed with nuts and bolts designed to cause maximum damage, but all three bombs were found and defused before they went off. Patrick McLaughlin, from Derry, was arrested in 1986 over the bombing attempt and was sentenced to life imprisonment. McLaughlin claimed he was innocent that he was a victim of a miscarriage of justice. In the book INLA: Deadly Divisions Henry McDonald and Jack Holland wrote: "McLaughlin is almost certainly an innocent man ... His links to the bomb team seem to be no more than accidental". A campaign claiming his innocence gathered some momentum in the 1990s. He was released in 1999 as part of the Good Friday Agreement.

== Sources ==
- NYTimes 11 October 1981
- Peter Taylor, The Provos: The IRA and Sinn Féin
- CAIN project
