= Kenneth Howorth =

British explosives officer (1932-1981)

Kenneth Howorth GM
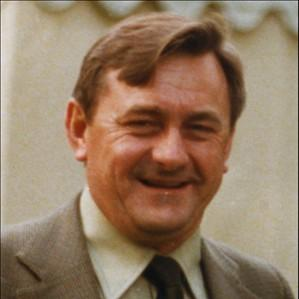
- Born: 28 September 1932; Littleborough, Lancashire, England
- Died: 26 October 1981 (aged 49); London, England
- Police career
- Department: Metropolitan Police Service
- Service years: 1973–1981
- Awards: George Medal

Kenneth Robert Howorth GM (28 September 1932 – 26 October 1981) was a British army officer and an explosives officer with London's Metropolitan Police Service who was killed whilst attempting to defuse a bomb planted by the Provisional IRA in Oxford Street.

Howorth served for twenty-three years with the Royal Army Ordnance Corps with postings to Austria, Japan, Tripoli in Libya, Stonecutters Island in Hong Kong and various United Kingdom bases. He reached the rank of Warrant Officer Class 1 (Conductor) before leaving to join the Metropolitan Police Service as a civilian explosives officer in 1973.

On 26 October 1981, police received warnings that bombs on a busy shopping street in central London would explode within thirty minutes. A booby-trapped bomb, planted by the IRA, was discovered in the basement toilet of a Wimpy restaurant on Oxford Street. While attempting to defuse the bomb, Howorth was killed instantly when it detonated. Howorth was survived by his wife Ann (who later died on 25 November 2003), his son Steven, and his daughter Susan. In 1983, he was awarded the George Medal for gallantry.

In 1985, IRA volunteers Paul Kavanagh and Thomas Quigley, both from Belfast, were convicted of Howorth's murder, along with other attacks, including the Chelsea Barracks nail bombing in September 1981, and each was given five life sentences with a minimum tariff of thirty-five years. In March 1999, the Northern Ireland Sentence Review Commission ordered the two men's release under the terms of the Good Friday Agreement, a decision immediately challenged at judicial review by the Home Secretary, Jack Straw. Mr Justice Girvan rejected the challenge, finding that the wisdom or fairness of the Northern Ireland Sentencing Act 1998, which established the early release scheme, was not a matter for the court and commenting "History will be the ultimate judge". The men were released on 23 March 1999.

== See also ==
- List of British police officers killed in the line of duty
