= 1974 Houses of Parliament bombing =

1974 IRA attack in London, England

Houses of Parliament bombing
- Part of the Troubles
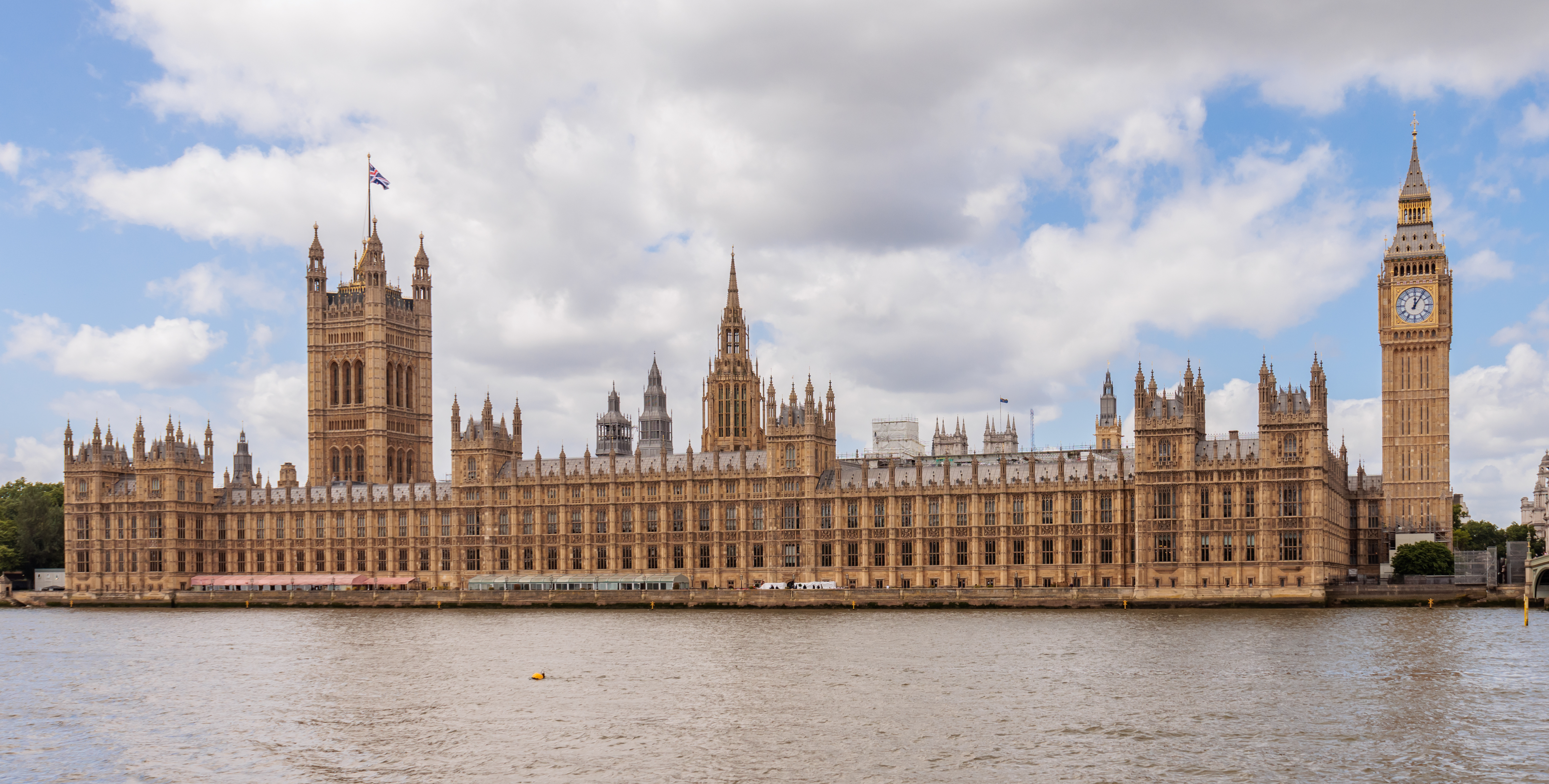
- Houses of Parliament in 2022
- Location: Houses of Parliament, London, United Kingdom
- Date: 17 June 1974; 08:30 (GMT)
- Target: Houses of Parliament
- Attack type: Time Bomb
- Deaths: 0
- Injuries: 11
- Perpetrator: Provisional IRA

On 17 June 1974 the Provisional IRA bombed the British Houses of Parliament causing extensive damage and injuring eleven people.

== Background ==
The Provisional IRA began a bombing campaign in England in March 1973 when they bombed the Old Bailey court house, injuring over 200 people. The following year was the worst year of the Troubles outside of Northern Ireland: at the beginning of 1974 the IRA exploded a bomb on a coach carrying soldiers and some family members on the M62, killing 12 people including four civilians. A month before the Houses of Parliament bombing, 34 people were killed in the Republic of Ireland in the Dublin and Monaghan bombings of May 1974 carried out by the Ulster Volunteer Force, the worst single incident of the conflict.

== Bombing ==
A man with an Irish accent telephoned the Press Association with a warning given six minutes before the device exploded. London police said a recognised IRA codeword was given. The bomb exploded in a corner of Westminster Hall at about 08:30 am on 17 June 1974. The IRA in a telephoned warning said it planted the bomb that weighed around 20 lb (9.1 kg). The explosion is suspected to have damaged a gas main and a fire spread fast through the main hall. An annex housing a canteen and a number of offices was destroyed, while the main hall itself received only light damage. The attack signaled the start of a renewed IRA bombing campaign in England that was to last until late 1975.

== Aftermath ==
The year 1974 ended with the IRA killing 28 people (23 civilians and 5 British soldiers) in bombing operations in England. 21 people were killed in the Birmingham pub bombings and a further 7 were killed in the Guildford and Woolwich Pub bombings. Nearly 300 people were injured from these bombings alone. The IRA called off their bombing campaign in February 1975 but restarted it in August 1975 with a bombing in a Caterham pub which injured over 30 people. A week later the IRA carried out the London Hilton bombing which killed 2 and injured over 60.

== See also ==
- 1974 Tower of London bombing
- Old Bailey bombing
- Brook's bombing
- List of attacks on legislatures
