= Biddy Mulligan's pub bombing =

1975 bombing carried out by the UDA in London

Coordinates: 51°32′30.65″N 0°11′52.96″W

- Part of the Troubles
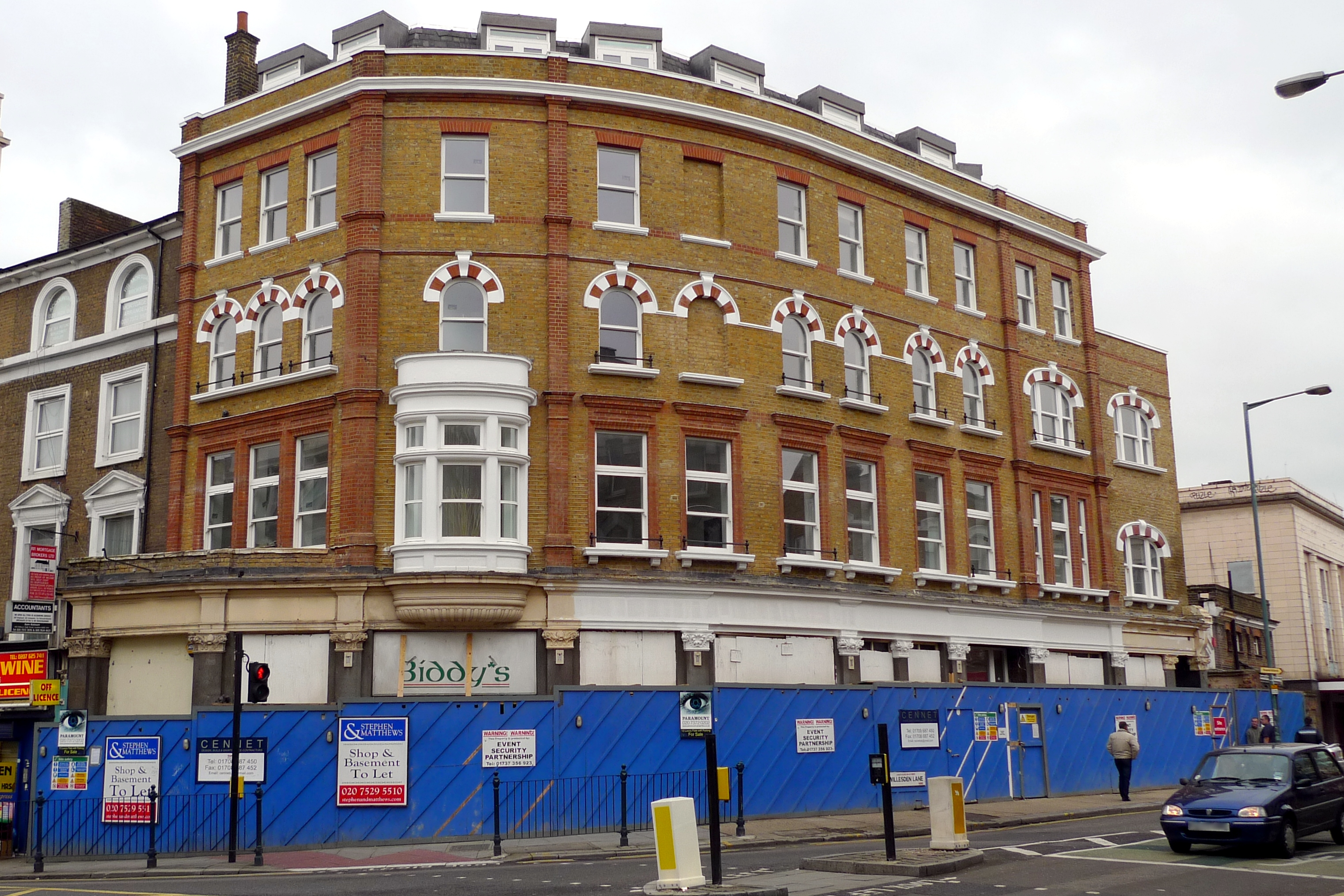
- Biddy Mulligan's pub in 2008, some time after closing down
- Location: Kilburn, London, England
- Date: 20 December 1975 (UTC)
- Target: Catholics/Irish republicans
- Attack type: Bomb
- Deaths: 0
- Injuries: 5
- Perpetrator: Ulster Defence Association (UDA)

The Biddy Mulligan's pub bombing occurred on the night of Saturday 20 December 1975 with the explosion of a 3 to 5 lb bomb at Biddy Mulligan's, an Irish pub on the corner of Kilburn High Road and Willesden Lane in northwest London. The device, left in a holdall, caused five injuries and damaged the premises.

The Ulster Defence Association (UDA) under the cover name Ulster Freedom Fighters (UFF) claimed responsibility, saying it was targeted because it was frequented by Irish republican sympathisers, with allegedly funds being raised for the Provisional Irish Republican Army (IRA). The attack ignited fears of a loyalist backlash against IRA attacks within England, and it was the first time the UDA struck outside Ireland. Indeed, a supposed Ulster Young Militants (UYM) caller claimed that they were going to "carry the war against the IRA on the mainland." A year earlier the funeral of Michael Gaughan took place in the area, which has a large Irish community, and likely the catalyst of the bombing.

A man and a woman in London, and four men in Glasgow, were arrested in connection with the attack. Samuel Carson and Alexander Brown of Bangor, County Down, and Noel Moore Boyd of Belfast, were jailed for 15, 14 and 12 years respectively at the Old Bailey in October 1976. Archibald McGregor Brown from Cumbernauld, who provided a safe haven in Scotland, received 10 years.

== See also ==
- 1975 Dublin Airport bombing
- Scott's Oyster Bar bombing
- Walton's Restaurant bombing
- Glasgow pub bombings
- Birmingham pub bombings
- 1975 Conway's Bar attack
- Hillcrest Bar bombing
- Balcombe Street siege
