= Rose & Crown Bar bombing =

1974 Bomb attack in Belfast

- Part of the Troubles
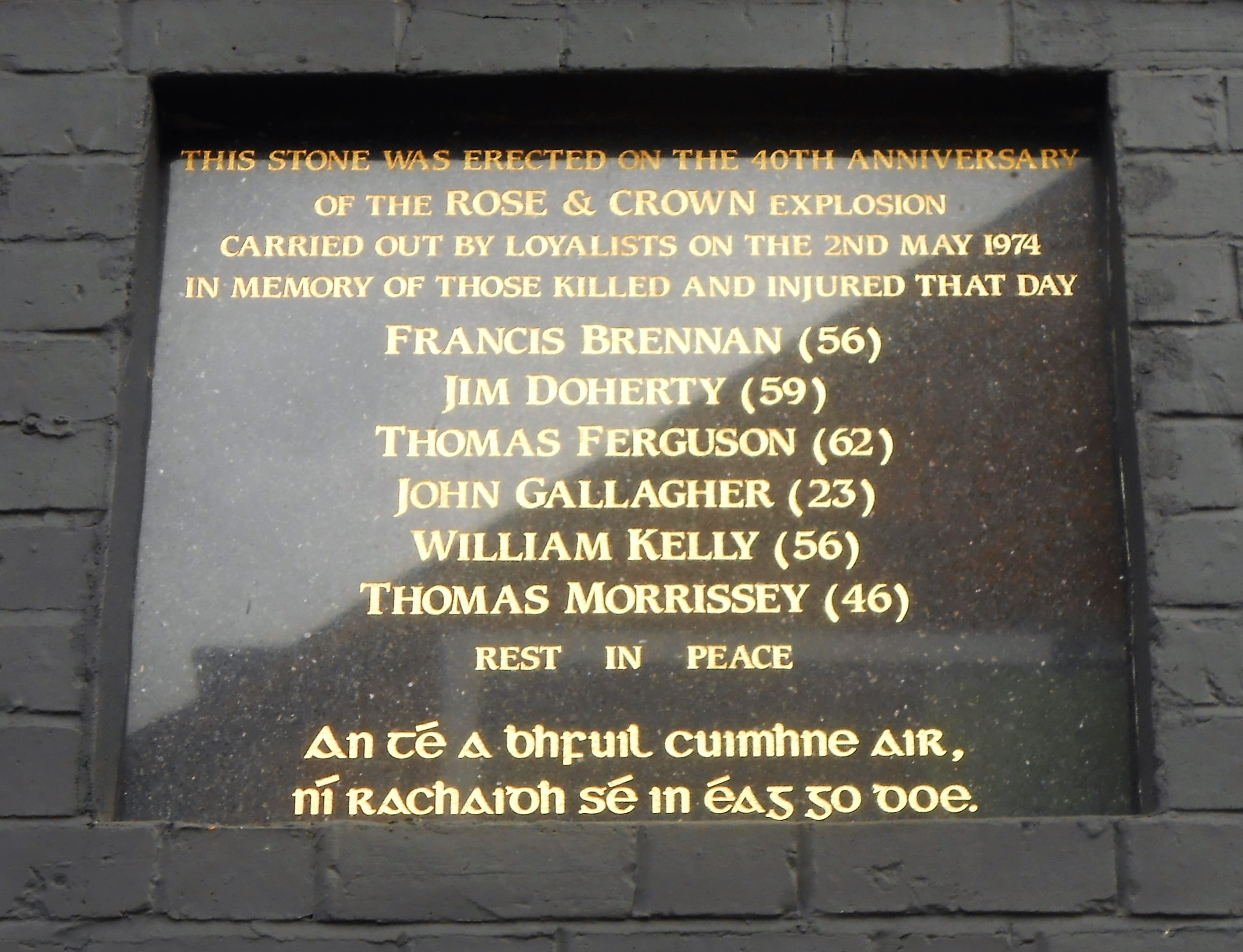
- Rose & Crown Memorial of the bombing
- Location: Ormeau Road, Belfast, Northern Ireland
- Date: 2 May 1974; 22:00 (GMT)
- Target: Irish Catholics, Irish Nationalists
- Attack type: Time bomb
- Weapon: bomb
- Deaths: 6
- Injuries: 18
- Perpetrator: Ulster Volunteer Force (UVF)

The Rose & Crown Bar bombing was a bomb attack carried out against a Catholic-owned pub in Belfast. The attack was carried out by the loyalist paramilitary group the Ulster Volunteer Force (UVF).

== The Bombing ==
On 2 May 1974 members of the Ulster Volunteer Force (UVF) threw a bomb, laden with 200lb of high explosives, through the front door of the Rose & Crown bar on the Ormeau Road. The bomb exploded immediately once inside. The explosion brought the front of the entrance crashing down, making it impossible for people to escape. Five Catholics were killed outright with another injured Catholic man dying several days later. Eighteen people were injured, including a 75-year-old man who lost a leg and another man who lost his arm.

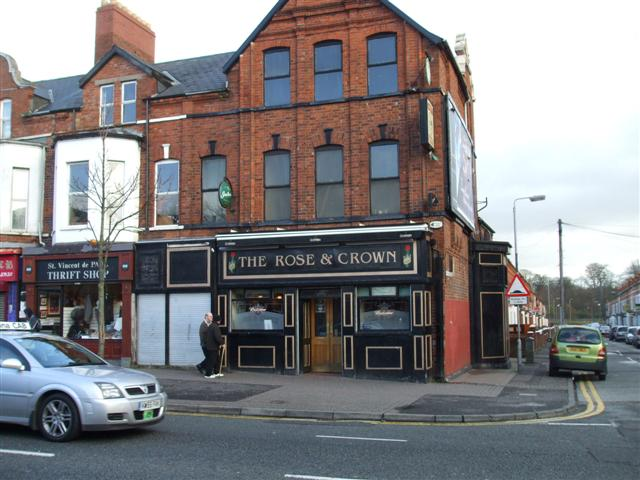
The Rose and Crown pub on the Lower Ormeau Road

== Aftermath ==
Two teenagers were eventually arrested and jailed for the bombing. In 2014, for the 40th anniversary of the bombing, a monument near the bomb site was dedicated to the victims of bombing.

== See also ==
- Timeline of Ulster Volunteer Force actions
- McGurk's Bar bombing
- Dublin and Monaghan bombings
- Loughinisland massacre
