= 1974 Tower of London bombing =

Suspected part of the Troubles in the UK

- Part of the Troubles (suspected)
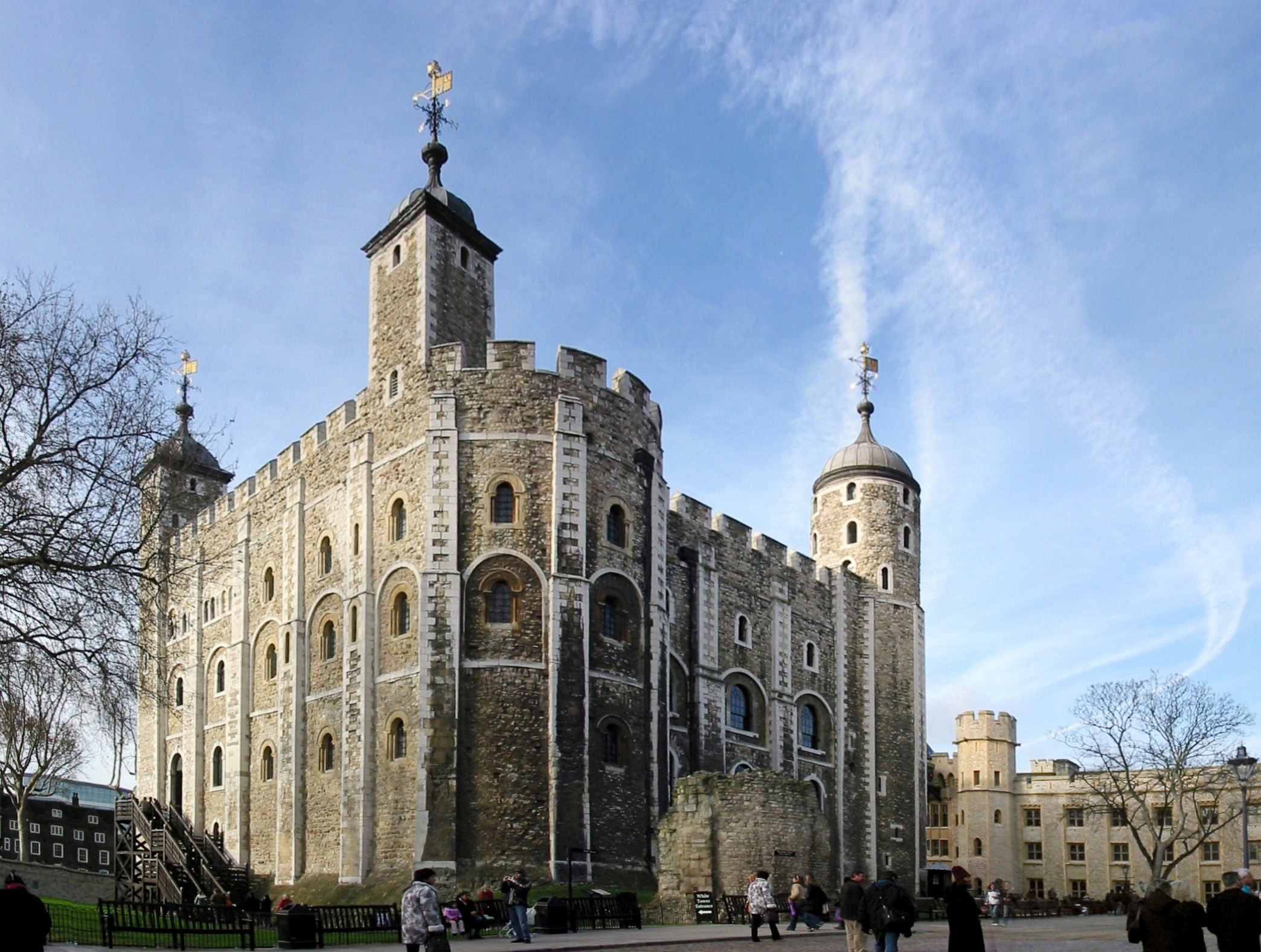
- The White Tower
- Location: 51.50823°N 0.07595°W; London, United Kingdom
- Date: 17 July 1974; 2:30 pm (UTC)
- Attack type: Bombing
- Deaths: 1
- Injuries: 41
- Perpetrator: Provisional IRA (suspected)

The 1974 Tower of London bombing happened on 17 July 1974 with the explosion of a 10–14-pound (4.5–6.4 kg) bomb in the White Tower of the Tower of London. The blast left one person dead and injured 41 people, with many having lost limbs and suffering severe facial injuries. The victim who died was Dorothy Household. At the time the Tower was busy with tourists. A dozen of the injuries were children. A scaffolding company working on the tower when the bomb detonated were able to act immediately to form the evacuation, ensuring the wounded were taken out of the building to safety and could gain urgent medical attention. The bomb was placed next to a wooden carriage of an 18th-century bronze cannon inside the Mortar Room. The gun carriage was destroyed.

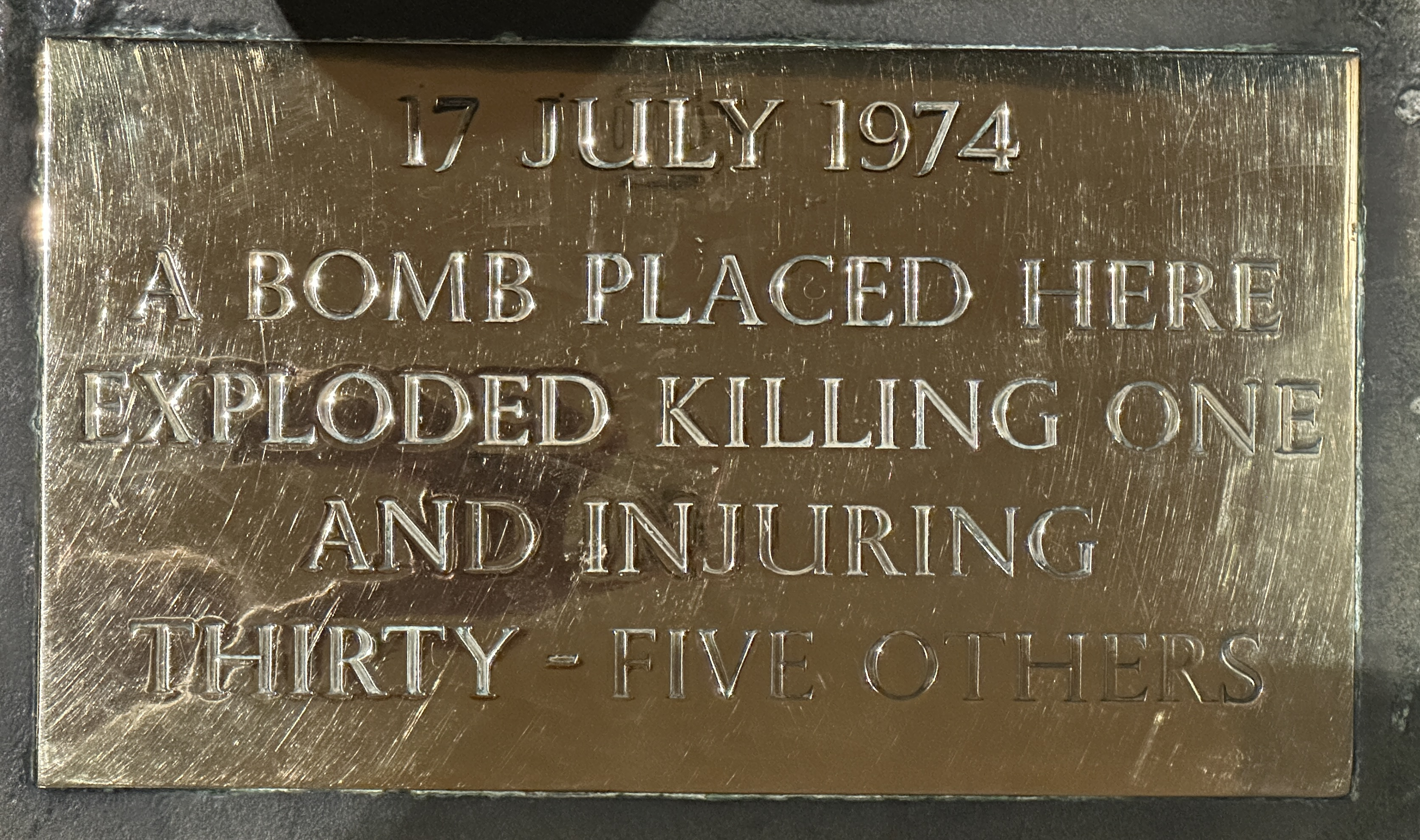
Plaque inside the White Tower noting where the bombing took place.

No group ever claimed responsibility for the attack, but it was widely believed the Provisional Irish Republican Army (IRA) was behind it. A month before the bomb, the IRA bombed the Houses of Parliament.

== See also ==
- 1974 Houses of Parliament bombing
- 1974 Oxford Street bombing
- Brooks's Club bombing
- 1974 London pillar box bombings
