= 1974 London pillar box bombings =

Series of IRA bombings in London in 1974

London pillar box bombings
- Part of The Troubles
- 1974 London pillar box bombings (Greater London) 1974 London pillar box bombings (the United Kingdom)
- Location: London, United Kingdom
- Date: 25 & 27 November 1974; 25 Nov: 5.50pm, 6.00pm, 6:50pm 27 Nov: 8.30pm & 8.50pm (GMT)
- Attack type: Time bomb
- Weapons: Gelignite bomb, "come-on bomb"
- Deaths: 0
- Injuries: 40
- Perpetrator: Provisional IRA

On 25 and 27 November 1974 the Provisional Irish Republican Army (IRA) placed several bombs in pillar boxes and one in a hedge behind a pillar box. This was a new tactic used by the IRA in England, although a similar tactic had been used in Northern Ireland during The Troubles several times previously. 40 people were wounded from five explosions in several districts.

== Background ==
The IRA began their bombing campaign of England in early 1973 when they bombed the Old Bailey courthouse, the seat of justice in Britain, they used a car bomb to attack it which injured over 200 people, caused extensive damage and one person died from a heart attack.

1974 was to be the IRA's most deadly year in England with close to 50 people being killed and with around 500 being injured. The year started with the M62 coach bombing a military coach which had soldiers and their families on it. Nine soldiers were killed and three civilians with just under 40 being injured, many seriously.

The IRA had been bombing targets in and around the London area since October 1974, including the Guildford pub bombings on 5 October and the Woolwich pub bombing on 7 November. Seven people were killed from these two bombings alone (5 British military personnel & 2 civilians) and almost 100 people were injured.

On 21 November the Birmingham pub bombings killed 21 and injured close to 200. The Prevention of Terrorism Act 1974 (PTA 1974) was passed through parliament quickly to give the police special powers in dealing with the IRA and similar groups. The powers gave the police powers to hold people in custody for up to seven days without charge. There was a strong desire to respond to what was perceived as "the greatest threat [to the country] since the end of the Second World War." Six men who were wrongly convicted of the bombings was a group known the Birmingham Six who spent 17 years in English jails until their convictions were overturned in 1991. The PTA 1974 was also used to convict other innocent people like Judith Ward of the M62 coach bombing and it was also used to convict the eleven members of the Guildford Four and Maguire Seven of the Guildford bombings. All these convictions were also overturned in the late 1980s/early 1990s.

== Bombings ==
Casualties
Caledonian Road	2
Piccadilly Circus	16
Victoria Street	2
Tite Street (1st)	0
Tite Street (2nd)	20

The IRA decided to send a message of defiance to the government over the PTA and to show that the IRA was very much still operational in England. They created bombs concealed in packets small enough to fit in a standard-sized pillar post box.

On 25 November 1974 the IRA planted bombs inside pillar boxes in various places around London. They made three small gelignite laden bombs with pocket watch timing devices. The first bomb on Caledonian Road, nearby King's Cross and Pentonville Road, went off at 5:50 pm that injured two people. Ten minutes later a second bomb went off outside Piccadilly Circus at 6:00 pm. This was the worst bomb of the day as it injured 16 people. The last bomb detonated near Metropole Cinema, just outside London Victoria station, and went off at 6:50 pm, injuring another 2 people. This brought the total injured to 20 for the day.

The Metropolitan Police called in the army bomb squad to check all pillar boxes in the W1 and N1 postal areas. In addition, false alarms throughout other places in London caused traffic chaos. The next day, many nervous post workers in central London refused to open boxes in fear that there could be a bomb.

Two days later on 27 November, a twin bomb attack near the National Army Museum on Tite Street in Chelsea occurred – again time bombs inside pillar boxes. The first bomb was small and designed to lure security services to the scene before a much larger bomb went off 21 minutes later in a hedge close by. The second explosion injured 20 people including an explosives officer, six policemen and two ambulancemen. Investigations showed that the second bomb had 3 to 5 lb of gelignite and 200 nails incorporated to make a claymore-type device. The second bomb was aimed to kill those on the scene.

== Aftermath ==
The secondary 'come-on' bomb in Chelsea, the first time it was deployed in London, forced the Metropolitan Police to make changes to responses to explosions. It required all police officers attending an explosion to carry out an immediate search around the scene and cordon the area off to ensure there would be no second bomb.

== Sources ==
- CAIN project
- Sixth Form Law
