= Caterham Arms pub bombing =

1975 terrorist attack in England

- Part of the Troubles
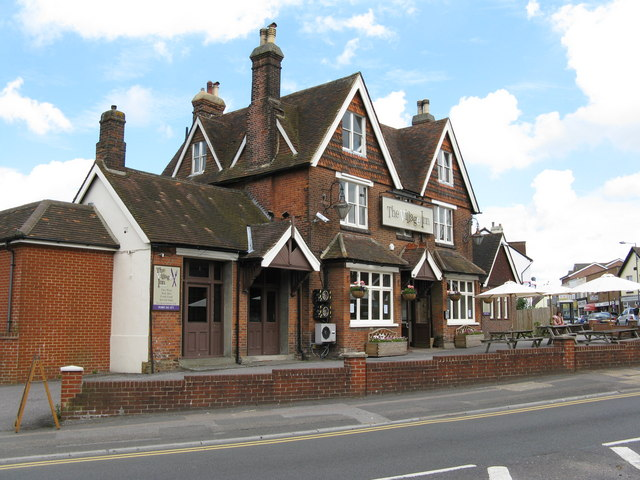
- The Caterham Arms in 2009
- Location: 51.2882°N 0.0983°W; Caterham, Surrey, England
- Date: 27 August 1975; 21:20 (GMT)
- Attack type: Time bomb
- Deaths: 0
- Injuries: 33
- Perpetrator: Provisional Irish Republican Army

On 27 August 1975 a Provisional Irish Republican Army bomb exploded without warning at the Caterham Arms public house in Caterham, Surrey, England. There were no fatalities, but 33 people were injured, some severely, including three off-duty soldiers who lost limbs.

== Background ==
In February 1975, the Provisional Irish Republican Army (IRA) agreed to a ceasefire with the British government. The last IRA attack in England was in January 1975 when they planted seven time bombs in London.

== The bombing ==
The IRA planted a time bomb in the Caterham Arms public house in Caterham, Surrey, leaving a 7 lb (3.2 kg) bomb in a duffel bag under a seat. There was no warning and the bomb exploded at 9:20pm, injuring 23 civilians and 10 off-duty soldiers. The pub was used by members of the Welsh Guards who were based at the barracks nearby. Some of the injuries were very serious, with at least three soldiers losing limbs, including a male soldier, who lost both legs and one arm, as well as two other soldiers who lost a leg each.

== Aftermath ==
This attack marked the start of a renewed bombing campaign in England and the end of the truce with the British government in England, in Ireland the truce was also starting to break with the South Armagh Brigade no longer recognizing the cease fire, having killed four British soldiers in July in a landmine attack in Forkhill, officially the truce lasted until January 1976.

The next day on 28 August 1975, the IRA detonated a bomb in Oxford Street, Central London, injuring several people; the following day on 29 August the IRA planted a booby-trap bomb in the doorway of a K-Shoes shop. Army bomb-disposal officer Roger Goad was killed while attempting to defuse the bomb.

== See also ==
- Chronology of Provisional Irish Republican Army actions (1970–1979)
- London Hilton bombing
- 1975 Piccadilly bombing
