= Timeline of the Troubles in Europe =

This is a timeline of the events and actions during the Troubles that were carried out in Western Europe, the countries included are West Germany, Belgium & the Netherlands the vast majority of which were carried out by Provisional IRA (PIRA) the other Irish Republican group was the Irish National Liberation Army (INLA) who carried out a small few attacks more for propaganda purposes. According to a study 18 people were killed on mainland Europe during The Troubles with around 60 people being injured. It is believed IRA Volunteers Dessie Grew & Donna Maguire were part of a four person active service unit based along the Belgian & Dutch border & who were responsible for many of the shootings & bombings in Europe from early 1989 to late 1990, with Dessie Grew as the commander of the unit.

== 1973 - 1987 ==
- January 1973 - A car bomb exploded in the Globe cinema carpark of JHQ Rheindahlen. The bomb was timed to go off when British military personnel were leaving the carpark. Nobody was hurt in the attack. A male & female IRA Volunteers were arrested shortly after.
- 18 August 1978 - Several bombs planted by the Provisional IRA detonated at the establishments of the British Army of the Rhine in West Germany. One person was injured in one of the blasts. Two days later on the 20 August a British Army spokesman said the PIRA was responsible.
- 22 March 1979 - Richard Sykes, then British ambassador to the Netherlands, and his Dutch valet, Karel Straub, were killed in a gun attack in The Hague, Netherlands
- 22 March 1979 - A Belgian bank employee was shot by the Provisional IRA, who thought it was Sir John Killick.
- 25 June 1979 - An IRA bomb in Brussels targeted but failed to hit a British general.
- 6 July 1979 - An IRA bomb detonates in a British consulate building in Antwerp, Belgium, causing damage but no injuries.
- 10 July 1979 - Two bombs planted by an IRA ASU exploded at a barracks of the British Army of the Rhine in Dortmund, West Germany, causing extensive damage but no injuries or deaths.
- 28 August 1979 - 1979 Brussels bombing. The IRA bombs the central square of Brussels whilst targeting British troops, injuring 18.
- 3 November 1979 - The Irish National Liberation Army (INLA) a Republican Socialist revolutionary group bombed the British consulate in Antwerp,
- 16 February 1980 - British soldier Mark Coe of the Royal Engineers was shot dead by an IRA unit outside his home, Bielefeld, West Germany.
- 1 March 1980 - Two IRA Volunteers shot and injured a British soldier who was jogging near his barracks in Osnabruck, Germany.
- 3 December 1980 - There was an assassination attempt on the then British European commissioner Christopher Tugendhat who was living in Belgium at the time when a passing car fired at him but missed just after he left his Brussels home. The PIRA later claimed responsibility for the attack.
- 24 November 1981 - The Irish National Liberation Army (INLA) claimed responsibility for exploding a bomb outside the British Consulate in Hamburg, West Germany.
- 25 November 1981 - the INLA claimed responsibility for exploding a bomb at a British Military base in Herford, West Germany; one British soldier was injured.
- 23 March 1987 - 31 people were injured in a car bomb attack at Rheindahlen Military Complex, near Mönchengladbach in Germany. See: 1987 Rheindahlen bombing

== 1988 - 1996 ==
- 6 March 1988 - Operation Flavius - A three-person IRA active service unit, while on a reconnaissance car bombing mission to Gibraltar, were shot dead by the SAS; locals said they heard no warning be given before the SAS opened fire, Seán Savage, Daniel McCann and Mairead Farrell were shot dead by SAS on the spot. Seán Savage, who was a few meters behind McCann & Farrell, seeing the shootings tried to run, but an SAS with high-powered pistols,
- 1 May 1988 - three British soldiers, all members of the Royal Air Force, were killed and four others were wounded when the IRA launched separate attacks in the Netherlands. In the first attack an IRA unit opened fire on a car carrying British soldiers near Roermond, killing one and injuring three. In the second attack, two British soldiers were killed when they triggered a booby trap bomb attached to their car in Nieuw-Bergen.
- 14 July 1988 - nine British soldiers were injured when the IRA detonated two bombs at a British military barracks in Duisburg, Germany. See: Glamorgan barracks bombing
- 6 August 1988 - Three Royal Engineers & a civilian were injured in a blast when the IRA bombed a British Army's Roy Barracks in Düsseldorf, Germany.
- 12 August 1988 - British Army Sergeant-Major Richard Heakin was shot dead by the IRA in Ostend, Belgium
- 30 August 1988 - Members of the IRA's European ASU Gerry McGeough and Gerard Hanratty were caught crossing the Dutch border by German police, the police discovered two AK47 assault rifles on them. They were later charged with the March 1987 bombing of JHQ Rheindahlen military base and the July 1988 of the British Army's Glamorgan barracks in Duisburg, both bombings happening in Germany close to Belgium's border. McGeough, who was wanted in the United States was extradited there on arms smuggling charges & served three years when he was released in 1996.
- 19 June 1989 - a bomb exploded at a British Army base in Osnabrück, Germany. There were no injuries but the explosion caused damage estimated at £75,000
- 2 July 1989 - a British soldier Steven Smith was killed in an IRA booby-trap bomb attack outside his home in Hanover, Germany. He was killed when an IRA bomb exploded as he opened the door of his Mercedes car
- 29 August 1989 - A booby-trap bomb placed under a British serviceman's car by the IRA in Hanover, Germany. German authorities said the bomb was a carbon copy of the bomb that killed British soldier Steven Smith in July.
- 2 September 1989 - two British soldiers were shot and seriously wounded at a military housing area near Munster, West Germany, in a suspected IRA attack
- 7 September 1989 - a German civilian (Heidi Hazell) was shot dead in West Germany in a stationary car with British licence plates[385] outside the British Army married quarters in Unna.[323] A gunman walked up to the car and shot her 14 times at point-blank range with an AK47. The IRA expressed regret for the death and claimed she had been shot "in the belief that she was a member of the British Army garrison" at nearby Dortmund.
- 26 October 1989 - IRA members opened fire on the car of an RAF corporal in West Germany. The car had stopped at a petrol station snack bar near RAF Wildenrath and inside it were the corporal, his wife, and their six-month-old daughter.[398] The corporal and his daughter were killed; his wife suffered shock.[398] The IRA expressed regret for the child's death and claimed its members did not know she was in the car
- 10 December 1989 - Two members from the Irish People's Liberation Organization (IPLO) shot and injured a gendarme in the Belgian port of Antwerp and escaped on foot. They had been intending to smuggle a small consignment of arms aboard a freighter bound for Ireland. Afterwards, Dutch police carried out raids on four homes and arrested an Irish citizen in Amsterdam.
- 4 May 1990 - a civilian security guard foiled an IRA bomb attack on British Army quarters in the Langenhagen barracks in Hannover, West Germany. Three men had penetrated the perimeter fence carrying two Semtex devices.[85] The IRA unit reportedly fired a number of shots before escaping.
- 27 May 1990 - two Australian tourists, Nick Spanos and Stephen Melrose, were shot dead in the Netherlands, having been mistaken for off-duty British soldiers from a base across the German border.[8] The IRA said it "deeply regretted the tragedy". See: Killings of Nick Spanos and Stephen Melrose
- 1 June 1990 - a British Royal Artillery officer, Michael Dillon-Lee, was shot dead by the IRA in Dortmund, West Germany. He was one of the most senior soldiers killed in the conflict – holding the rank of major. In a subsequent car chase a West German police officer was injured when the IRA unit fired on the pursuing officers.
- 14 June 1990 - a large IRA bomb badly damaged a building inside a British Army Training Camp in Hamelin near Hanover, West Germany.
- 28 June 1996 - The IRA launched a mortar attack on a British Army base in Germany. See: Osnabrück mortar attack

== See also ==
- Timeline of the Troubles in Great Britain
- Timeline of the Troubles in the Republic of Ireland
