= Killing of Heidi Hazell =

German citizen murdered by the IRA

Heidi Hazell
- Born: Heidi Schnaars; 24 September 1962; Worpswede, West Germany
- Died: 7 September 1989 (aged 26); Unna, Dortmund, West Germany
- Cause of death: Multiple gunshot wounds
- Known for: Victim of Provisional Irish Republican Army assassination

Heidi Hazell (24 September 1962 – 7 September 1989) was a German citizen murdered by the Provisional Irish Republican Army (IRA). The investigation into her murder was reopened in March 2015. The victim's family and the German Federal Attorney have argued that the Good Friday Agreement, which imposes limitations on retrospective criminal proceedings being filed against paramilitaries who committed crimes during The Troubles, may not be binding. This argument is made on the basis that the Geneva Convention would supersede the Good Friday Agreement in a situation where a civilian non-combatant like Hazell was killed by a paramilitary, thereby demanding prosecution as a war crime. The murder of Hazell, a German citizen, also took place in Germany and the country is not legally bound by the agreement between the United Kingdom and Ireland.

== Background ==
Heidi Hazell was born in Worpswede, West Germany, as Heidi Schnaars. In 1986, she married a British soldier stationed in the country. On 7 September 1989, in Unna near Dortmund, Hazell was sitting in the family car at her home. The car was approached by a member of the Irish Republican Army (IRA) in British Army battle dress, who opened fire with a Kalashnikov automatic weapon, shooting her over a dozen times. The gunman got into a car driven by another person and drove away.

British Prime Minister Margaret Thatcher described the murder of Hazell as "evil and cowardly". Speaking during a visit to Forres Academy, she said: "Let this message get across: Terrorists don't hesitate to attack wives and children, people who are totally innocent. That shows the evil nature of the work they do." The Generalbundesanwalt investigated against five individuals, known to be involved in terrorist activity, amongst which was Dessie Grew. At Grew's passing on 9 October 1990, the inquiry against him was concluded. It was the second IRA attack in West Germany that week, a previous one resulting in two British soldiers shot near Münster.

In a statement released in Dublin the following day, the IRA said:

An IRA Active Service Unit carried out last night's shooting in West Germany. The woman killed was believed to have been a member of the British Crown Forces garrisoned in Dortmund. It has now emerged that she was the German wife of a British Army staff sergeant. As we intend continuing our campaign until the British Army withdraws from Ireland, the outcome of last night's attack reinforces a warning we gave on 2 August 1988, for civilians to stay well clear of British military personnel. This warning applies to the use of vehicles personally belonging to British soldiers and all modes of military transport.

Sinn Féin President Gerry Adams responded to civilians that had been recently killed by the IRA, such as Hazell, husband and wife James and Ellen Sefton, Islania Niurati the six-month-old child of a British soldier in Germany, and teenager Terry Love, saying:

There can be no doubt where Sinn Fein stands on actions which lead to the deaths of civilians or injuries to civilians. I don't want to see anyone killed, much less a 19-year-old soldier, an Australian citizen or an Irish citizen, but there is a conflict. There is a war going on. People join armies to fight.

== Campaign of Melanie Anan ==
Melanie Anan, the niece of Hazell, started campaigning for justice, she inquired with witnesses and spoke to the Police Service of Northern Ireland. On 9 March 2015, she spoke at the European Day for Victims of Terrorism at Stormont Parliament. "Mrs Anan told the event that she finds it shocking that, in Northern Ireland, convicted terrorists are elected to government."

On 16 March 2015, Anan wrote an open letter to President Barack Obama, which was subsequently published by the unionist newspaper Belfast Telegraph. Turning to the President's relationship with Sinn Fein, Anan urged Obama to distance himself. "As we have been doing our research and inquiries as a family, we came across a picture of you and Gerry Adams; centered in the picture, Rita O'Hare, a wanted woman in Northern Ireland, as she shot a soldier in Northern Ireland," she wrote. On 16 March 2015, Adams was denied entry into the White House to celebrate St Patrick’s Day.

== Reopening of investigation into murder ==
The Generalbundesanwalt (German federal attorney) reopened the investigation into the murder of Hazell in March 2015. New evidence introduced to the authorities led to the decision to reopen the case, which had been closed in 1993.

== See also ==
- Chronology of Provisional Irish Republican Army actions (1980–89)
- Killings of Nick Spanos and Stephen Melrose
- List of unsolved murders (1980–1999)
- Osnabrück mortar attack
