= Lichfield gun attack =

1990 Provisional IRA shooting

- Part of the Troubles
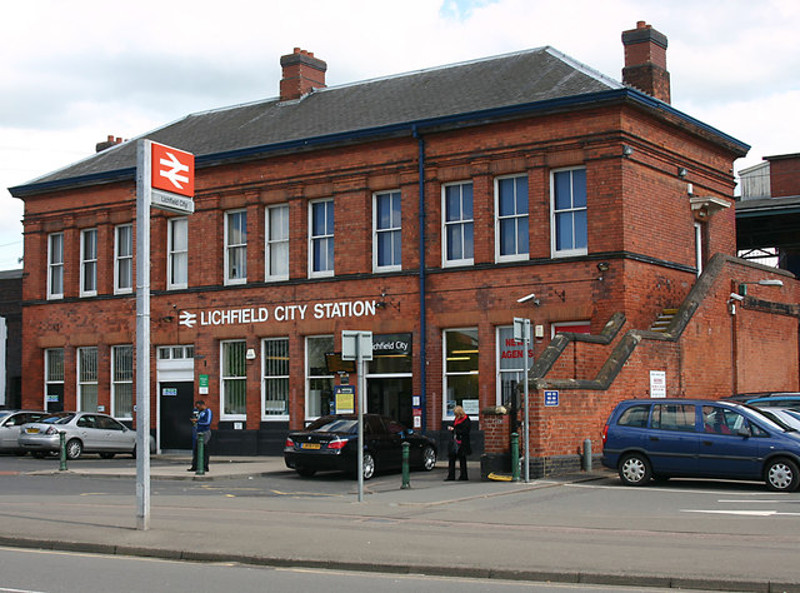
- Front of Lichfield City Station where the attack took place
- Location: Lichfield, Staffordshire, England
- Date: 1 June 1990; 14:49 (UTC)
- Target: British military personnel
- Attack type: shooting
- Weapon: Handguns
- Deaths: 1 British soldier
- Injuries: 2 British soldiers
- Perpetrator: Provisional IRA
- Assailants: IRA active service unit in West Midlands, England

The Lichfield gun attack was an ambush carried out by the Provisional IRA (IRA) on 1 June 1990 against three off-duty British soldiers who were waiting at Lichfield City railway station in Staffordshire. The attack resulted in one soldier being killed and two others badly wounded.

== Background ==
The IRA had stepped up their campaign against British military targets outside Northern Ireland in the late 1980s. In May 1988 they killed members of the RAF in attacks in the Netherlands. On 13 July 1988 nine British soldiers were injured when the IRA detonated two bombs at a British military barracks in Duisburg, Germany. On 1 August 1988 the first Provisional IRA bomb in England in four years was set off by a timer device at the British Army base at the Inglis Barracks in Mill Hill, North London. The two storey building containing the single men's quarters was completely destroyed. One soldier, Lance Corporal Michael Robbins, was killed. Nine others were injured. In September 1989 eleven Royal Marines were killed and 22 others injured when the IRA bombed their barracks in Deal, Kent, England. On 18 November 1989 two British soldiers were wounded when an IRA car bomb exploded at a British Army barracks in Colchester, England. On 20 February 1990 the IRA bombed a British military recruitment office in Leicester, England. Two people were injured in this attack. Five days later on 25 February 1990, another recruitment office was bombed, this time in Halifax, West Yorkshire. Less than three weeks before the Lichfield attack 16 May 1990 the IRA detonated another bomb under a military minibus in London, killing Sergeant Charles Chapman, and injuring four other soldiers. After this attack the IRA released a statement which read: "While the British government persists in its continued occupation of the north of Ireland the IRA will persist in attacking the British government and its forces in England."

== The shooting ==
On 1 June 1990 three off-duty British soldiers were sitting on a bench on a platform at Lichfield City railway station. Suddenly two paramilitary volunteers from the Provisional IRA appeared on the platform, pulled out handguns and fired shots at the soldiers, then jumped onto the tracks, ran across the line and through a builder's yard opposite the station. The attack killed 18-year-old private William Robert Davies of Pontarddulais, south Wales and injured two other soldiers, Robert Parkin, 20, and Neil Evans, 19. A British Rail employee who witnessed the shooting said he jumped across the tracks to try to help the soldiers.

"I and a station employee tried to staunch the flow of blood from the chest of one of the soldiers," he said.

The three soldiers, who were in training at Whittington Barracks, were waiting for a train to nearby Birmingham for weekend leave, said Detective Chief Superintendent Malcolm Bevington.

A week before the attack two Australian tourists, Nick Spanos and Stephen Melrose, were shot dead by IRA gunmen who mistook the Australians for British off-duty soldiers. These killings caused outrage across Australia, Britain and Ireland.

== Aftermath ==
The IRA released a statement after the attacks, saying: "While British troops remain in Ireland such attacks will continue."

The IRA continued their campaign in England and mainland Europe. On 9 June 1990 the IRA bombed the headquarters of the British Army's Honourable Artillery Company in central London, wounding 19 people. On 14 June 1990 a large IRA bomb badly damaged a building inside a British Army base at Hanover, West Germany. On 25 June 1990 an IRA bomb exploded at the Carlton Club in London, injuring 20 people. One of the wounded, Conservative politician Lord Kaberry, died of his injuries on 13 March 1991.

As of 2013, no-one had been convicted of the murder of Pte Davies.
