= Glamorgan barracks bombing =

1988 IRA bombing of British Army barracks in Germany

Glamorgan Barracks bombing
- Part of the Troubles
- Location: Duisburg, West Germany
- Date: 14 July 1988 (UTC)
- Attack type: Bomb
- Deaths: 0
- Injuries: 9
- Perpetrator: Provisional Irish Republican Army (IRA)

The Glamorgan barracks bombing was the bombing of a British Army military barracks in Duisburg, West Germany, carried out by the Provisional Irish Republican Army (IRA). The attack injured nine soldiers. The Glamorgan barracks housed soldiers from the Royal Corps of Transport. Seventy soldiers were sleeping at the time of the explosion. The two 20 lb (9 kg) bombs blew a hole in the barracks and tore the roof. Nine British soldiers received minor wounds. It was the first IRA attack on the European mainland since the Netherlands attacks in May. The two bombs were placed some eight yards inside the barracks compound, against the wall of the quarters were some 70 soldiers were sleeping. None of the nine injured soldiers needed hospital treatment, although an army sergeant spokesman said they were very lucky nobody was killed. Moments after the blast police saw the IRA getaway car run a red light and gave chase, but the IRA unit fired shots at the police car and the police gave up the chase, letting the IRA volunteers escape.

A month after the Glamorgan barracks bombing, the IRA bombed Roy barracks in Düsseldorf, West Germany. The blast tore part of the roof and wounded three British soldiers and a civilian.

== See also ==
- 1988 IRA attacks in the Netherlands
- Operation Flavius
- 1987 Rheindahlen bombing
- Provisional Irish Republican Army campaign 1969–1997
- Timeline of the Troubles in Europe
