= 1987 Rheindahlen bombing =

IRA attack on British Army in West Germany

- Part of the Troubles
- Location: Rheindahlen, West Germany
- Date: 23 March 1987; 22:30 (UTC+01:00)
- Target: Military target
- Attack type: Car bomb
- Deaths: 0
- Injuries: 31
- Perpetrator: Provisional IRA

The 1987 Rheindahlen bombing was a car bomb attack on 23 March 1987 at JHQ Rheindahlen military barracks, the British Army headquarters in West Germany, injuring thirty-one. The large 300 lb (140 kg) car bomb exploded near the visitors officers' mess of the barracks. The Provisional IRA later stated it had carried out the bombing. It was the second bombing in Rheindahlen, the first being in 1973, and the start of the IRA's campaign on mainland Europe from the late 1980s to the early 1990s. Although British soldiers were targeted, most of the injured were actually German officers and their wives. JHQ Rheindahlen was home to four major headquarters: two British (British Army of the Rhine and Royal Air Force Germany) and two NATO (Northern Army Group (NORTHAG) and Second Allied Tactical Air Force).

== Background ==
Other than attacks in Northern Ireland and England the Provisional IRA also carried out attacks in other countries such as West Germany, Belgium, and the Netherlands, where British soldiers were based. Between 1979 and 1990, eight unarmed soldiers and six civilians died in these attacks. It was the first IRA attack in West Germany since a British Army officer, Colonel Mark Coe, was shot dead by an IRA unit outside his home in, Bielefeld in February 1980. Coe's assassination was one of the first high-profile killings by the IRA in Germany and on mainland Europe. A year before, British Ambassador to the Netherlands Sir Richard Sykes was assassinated, whilst four British soldiers were hurt in the 1979 Brussels bombing in Belgium, just one day after the killing of Lord Mountbatten and the Warrenpoint ambush, which killed 18 British soldiers. In November 1981 the Irish National Liberation Army (INLA) bombed a British Army base in Herford, West Germany. There were no injuries in the attack. There was also a mortar attack on British Army base in Germany in 1996.

== The bombing ==
The IRA planted a 300-pound car bomb inside JHQ Rheindahlen, near the officers' mess (one of four at the JHQ). When the large car bomb exploded 31 people were injured, some of them badly. Twenty-seven Germans and four Britons were hurt in the bombing at 22:30 local time, among them Generalmajor Hans Hoster, the Chief of Staff of NATO's Northern Army Group. Rheindahlen was a major British military base in West Germany, with more than 12,000 service personnel (British and NATO) being stationed there. It was the headquarters of both the British Army of the Rhine and Royal Air Force Germany (RAF Rheindahlen).

The force of the blast ripped up the road and caused extensive damage to parked cars and surrounding buildings. The injured were taken to the RAF hospital at Wegberg, a few miles south of Rheindahlen, near the Dutch border.

== Aftermath ==
The IRA later said it had carried out the bombing of the Rheindahlen barracks. A statement from the IRA said: "Our unit's brief was to inflict a devastating blow but was ordered to be careful to avoid civilian casualties."

The National Democratic Front for the Liberation of West Germany, a previously unheard of group, also claimed to have been behind the attack.

The British Army of the Rhine was renamed British Forces Germany (BFG) in 1994.

== See also ==
- Osnabrück mortar attack
- Glamorgan Barracks bombing
- 1988 IRA attacks in the Netherlands
- Timeline of the Troubles in Europe
