= 1975 London bombing =

1975 London bombing may refer to:

- Scott's Oyster Bar bombing
- London Hilton bombing
- Green Park tube station bombing
- Walton's Restaurant bombing
- Trattoria Fiore bombing
