= Killings of Nick Spanos and Stephen Melrose =

Australian tourists murdered by the IRA

Stephen Melrose and Nick Spanos

Nick Spanos and Stephen Melrose were Australian tourists shot dead on 27 May 1990 in Roermond, the Netherlands by the Provisional Irish Republican Army (IRA), which stated it had mistaken them for off-duty British soldiers. The attack was part of an IRA campaign in Continental Europe.

== Background ==
British military personnel had been stationed in West Germany since the end of the Second World War. The Provisional IRA had been carrying out attacks in mainland Europe since 1979. Between 1988 and 1990 it intensified its operations there. On 1 May 1988, three members of the Royal Air Force (RAF) were killed in two IRA attacks in the Netherlands. One of the attacks took place in Roermond. On 12 August, Richard Michael Heakin, a British sergeant-major was shot dead at Ostend, Belgium. In June 1989, a British base in Osnabrück was bombed and the following month a British soldier was killed by an IRA booby trap bomb in Hanover.

Cars owned by British military personnel in Germany had distinctive number plates, which helped the IRA identify targets. In August 1988, following the killing of the three RAF members, they were replaced with standard British number plates. Critics of the move warned that British tourists would be at risk as their cars would be indistinguishable from soldiers' cars.

On 7 September 1989 German civilian Heidi Hazell, the wife of a British soldier, was shot dead as she sat in a car outside a British Army married quarter in Unna. The car had British number plates. The IRA stated she had been shot "in the belief that she was a member of the British army garrison at Dortmund".

On 26 October 1989, IRA members opened fire on the car of RAF corporal Mick Islania. The corporal had just returned to the car from a petrol station snack bar in Wildenrath. Also in the car were his wife Smita and their six-month-old daughter Nivruti. Corporal Islania was hit by multiple rounds and died instantly; his daughter was killed by a single shot to the head. Smita Islania suffered shock. The IRA expressed regret for the child's death and stated its members did not know she was in the car.

== The shooting ==
Nick Spanos (28) and Stephen Melrose (24) were Australian lawyers, based in London. They were in the Netherlands on a four-day holiday with Vicky Coss (Spanos's girlfriend) and Lyndal Melrose (Stephen's wife). On the night of 27 May 1990, the two couples had a meal at a restaurant in the town of Roermond, near the border with West Germany. The town was popular with off-duty British servicemen stationed in Germany; the Royal Air Force (RAF) bases of RAF Wildenrath, RAF Bruggen and JHQ Rheindahlen were nearby. As they returned to their car, at about 11pm, Spanos and Melrose were shot dead by two men clad in black with automatic weapons. The women were unhurt. The car used by the gunmen was found burnt-out in Belgium, the border of which is also near to Roermond.

== Aftermath ==
The IRA claimed responsibility the next day. Its statement said that its members mistook the two men for off-duty British soldiers and called the shooting "a tragedy and a mistake". The car used by Spanos and Melrose had British number plates, and Dutch police believed this may have led to them being targeted. Australian Prime Minister Bob Hawke described the statement of regret as "twisted, too late and meaningless."

Five days after the attack, the IRA shot dead Michael Dillon-Lee, a British Army major, in Dortmund. Two weeks later, it bombed a British Army base at Hanover.

Paul Hughes (born Newry, 1958), Donna Maguire (born Newry, 1963), Sean Hick (born Glenageary, 1956), and Gerard Harte (born Lurgan, 1956) were arrested in Belgium in June 1990, and were later charged with the murders of Spanos, Melrose and Major Dillon-Lee. Harte was convicted of the murders of Spanos and Melrose and sentenced to 18 years in prison, but his conviction was overturned on appeal. The other three were acquitted of the Roermond murders, but then extradited to Germany and tried for the murder of Major Dillon-Lee. All three were acquitted as well, although Maguire was remanded and later convicted of taking part in bombing a British Army base in Osnabrück in 1989. Evidence also linked Desmond Grew, an IRA volunteer later shot dead by the Special Air Service, to the group.

== Subsequent activity by Melrose family ==
In August 2010, Stephen Melrose's parents and sister visited Stormont to "find answers about his murder". They were greeted by Ulster Unionist Party MLA, David McNarry, but denied a meeting by both deputy First Minister, Martin McGuinness and Sinn Féin President, Gerry Adams. Speaking to the Belfast Telegraph, Melrose's sister, Helen Jackson, said the refusals of McGuinness and Adams "spoke volumes". She went on to say that:

"We feel that, basically, justice was never done. The people who killed Stephen are walking the street, living life, like us. How can that happen? We are just wondering how the system works, that that can be allowed to happen. Stephen was a lawyer, he deserves justice, everybody does.

Eighty-year-old Roy Melrose stated:

"We just wanted to find out if we could get any answers as to why the murderers of our son were let off. We feel that time heals a lot. We've looked at it that our son is a hero, that helps us a lot, thinking that way. He is a hero. I think there seems to be a lot of forgotten victims."

Before travelling to Northern Ireland, the family visited the murder scene in the Netherlands for the first time.

== See also ==
- Chronology of Provisional Irish Republican Army actions (1992–1999)
- 1988 IRA attacks in the Netherlands
- Osnabrück mortar attack
- Timeline of the Troubles in Europe
