= The Hooded Gunman =

Online game

A screenshot of the since deleted Hooded Gunman website, taken from the official Facebook page

The Hooded Gunman was a massively multiplayer online role-playing game created by entrepreneur Warren Dowey. The game was based on The Troubles of Northern Ireland. The game allowed the user to build a Loyalist or Republican criminal gang to build an empire based on racketeering drugs and killing members of the opposition. The game caused controversy in Northern Ireland due to its sensitive nature.

The game attracted heavy criticism from the Ulster Unionist Party. Their spokesperson Derek Hussey described it as 'tasteless and insensitive' and added that 'there is nothing glamorous or playful about para-militarism in Northern Ireland. At a time when many victims are coming to terms with the new dispensation and politicians are trying to draw a line under the past, this type of nonsense does not help'. The creator, Dowey, defended the game's existence, saying 'I don't want to take away from the fact that many people lost their lives to violence' and that 'The game does not glorify the paramilitaries by any sense, in fact it portrays them as drug dealers, and peddlers of alcohol and prostitution. There are no civilians within the game'. He also added that he believed the game was useful as a tool for combating PTSD.

The game, and its associated website, have since been taken offline. The official Facebook page for the game was last updated in June 2013, so it can be assumed the game was taken offline some time after that date. The Facebook page also provides some of the only extant images of the game's website, as well as some images of the artwork for the game. The page also contains deprecated links to a product page for a mug, indicating the game also sold merchandise.

== See also ==
- The Troubles
- Outline of the Troubles
- Timeline of the Troubles
- List of Irish uprisings
