= Outline of the Troubles =

The Troubles, a historical ethno-nationalist conflict in Northern Ireland that lasted about 30 years from the late 1960s to 1998. Also known internationally as the Northern Ireland conflict, it is sometimes described as an "irregular war" or "low-level war". The conflict began in the late 1960s and is usually deemed to have ended with the Good Friday Agreement of 1998. Although the Troubles mostly took place in Northern Ireland, at times violence spilled over into parts of the Republic of Ireland, England, and mainland Europe.

== Main articles ==
=== General ===
- Murals in Northern Ireland
- Operation Banner
- Provisional IRA campaign 1969–1997
- Segregation in Northern Ireland
- Parades in Northern Ireland
- The Troubles in Derry

=== Timelines ===
- Timeline of the Northern Ireland Troubles (1966–1998)
- Timeline of the Troubles in the Republic of Ireland (1969–1998)
- Timeline of the Northern Ireland Troubles in Britain (1969–1997)
- List of bombings during the Northern Ireland Troubles (1969–1998)

==== of republican actions ====
- Timeline of Provisional Irish Republican Army actions (1970–1997)
- Timeline of Irish National Liberation Army actions (1975–1999)
- Timeline of Continuity Irish Republican Army actions (1994–present)
- Timeline of Real Irish Republican Army actions (1997–present)
- Timeline of Óglaigh na hÉireann actions (2006–present)
- Timeline of Irish People's Liberation Organisation actions (1986–1992)
- Timeline of Official Irish Republican Army actions (1969–1972)

==== of loyalist actions ====
- Timeline of Ulster Volunteer Force actions (1966–1994)
- Timeline of Ulster Defence Association actions (1971–1994, 1997–1998)
- Timeline of Loyalist Volunteer Force actions (1996–2000)
- Timeline of Red Hand Commando actions (1973–1994)
- Timeline of Orange Volunteer Force actions (1998–2009)

== Paramilitaries ==
Laws in both the Republic of Ireland and the UK proscribe (ban) membership of a number of Irish republican and Ulster loyalist groups. Several other smaller paramilitary factions have appeared throughout the Troubles, and some groups have used cover-names to deflect responsibility for attacks.

In this context, operational refers to the period during which the 'official' paramilitary campaign was conducted.

=== Republicans ===
Name	Initials	Operational
Saor Éire	SÉ	1967–1975
Provisional Irish Republican Army	PIRA	1970–2005
Official Irish Republican Army	OIRA	1970–1972
Irish National Liberation Army	INLA	1974–2009
Irish People's Liberation Organisation	IPLO	1986–1992
Continuity Irish Republican Army	CIRA	1994–
Real Irish Republican Army	RIRA	1997–
Óglaigh na hÉireann (Real IRA splinter group)	ONH	2009–

Umbrella groups

- Irish Republican Socialist Movement
- Provisional Republican Movement

=== Loyalists ===
Name	Initials	Operational
Ulster Protestant Volunteers	UPV	1966–1969
Ulster Volunteer Force; Red Hand Commando	UVF; RHC	1966– 1972–2007
Ulster Defence Association; Ulster Freedom Fighters	UDA; UFF	1971–
Ulster Resistance	UR	1986–?
Loyalist Volunteer Force	LVF	1996–2005
Orange Volunteers	OV	1998–
Red Hand Defenders	RHD	1998–

Umbrella groups

- Ulster Army Council (UAC)
- Ulster Loyalist Central Co-ordinating Committee (ULCCC)
- Combined Loyalist Military Command (CLMC)

=== Cover names used by paramilitaries ===
- Protestant Action Force – Used by the UVF to claim sectarian attacks.
- South Armagh Republican Action Force – Used by the PIRA's South Armagh Brigade to claim sectarian attacks in the mid-1970s
- Catholic Reaction Force – Used by the INLA to claim sectarian attacks.
- Armagh People's Republican Army & People's Liberation Army – was used by the INLA to claim some of their earliest attacks, mostly in 1975.
- Ulster Freedom Fighters – Used by the UDA to claim violent attacks.
- Red Hand Brigade – Was used as a cover by the Glenanne gang members who carried out the Dublin and Monaghan bombings in May 1974.

=== Periods of activity ===
In the table below:

- The period of activity for republican groups is shown in green.
- The period of activity for loyalist groups is shown in orange.
- The period of ceasefire is shown in grey.

Group	Year																													
Group	70	71	72	73	74	75	76	77	78	79	80	81	82	83	84	85	86	87	88	89	90	91	92	93	94	95	96	97	98	99
Provisional IRA																														
Official IRA																														
UVF																														
UDA																														
INLA																														
IPLO																														
Continuity IRA																														
Real IRA																														
LVF																														

== State security forces ==
=== United Kingdom ===
- British Army
  - Territorial Army
  - Force Research Unit
  - Military Reaction Force
- Royal Air Force
- Royal Navy
- Metropolitan Police
- MI5
- GCHQ
- Secret Intelligence Service

==== Northern Ireland ====
- Royal Ulster Constabulary (RUC)
  - RUC Special Branch
- Ulster Special Constabulary (USC) – to 30 April 1970
- Northern Ireland Prison Service (NIPS)
- Ulster Defence Regiment (UDR) – from 1 January 1970 to 30 June 1992
- Royal Irish Regiment (RIR) – from 1 July 1992

=== Republic of Ireland ===
- Irish Army
- Garda Síochána (police)

== Political parties ==
Listing includes brief summary of ideology and position on the Good Friday Agreement 1998.

=== Irish nationalist ===
==== Pro-Agreement ====
- Sinn Féin (SF). President: Mary Lou MacDonald. Militant Republican and Socialist. Associated with the Provisional IRA. Translation from Irish: "We Ourselves".
- The Social Democratic and Labour Party (SDLP). Leader: Colum Eastwood. Moderate centre-left nationalist.
- The Workers' Party (WP). Leadership Disputed between Michael McCorry and Ted Tynan. Marxist nationalist. Formerly Official Sinn Féin.

==== Anti-Agreement ====
- The Irish Republican Socialist Party (IRSP). Militant socialist nationalist. Political wing of INLA. Have been on ceasefire since 1998.
- Republican Sinn Féin (RSF). President: Seosamh Ó Maoileoin. Militant nationalist. Associated with the Continuity IRA.
- The 32 County Sovereignty Movement (32CSM). President: Francis Mackey. Militant nationalist. Associated with the Real IRA.
- The Republican Network for Unity (RNU). Militant nationalist. Accused by Police Service of Northern Ireland (PSNI) of being the political wing of Óglaigh na hÉireann (Real IRA splinter group), however this is rejected by both groups.

==== Others ====
- Fianna Fáil
- Fine Gael
- Green Party
- Renua

=== Unionist ===
==== Pro-Agreement ====
- The Democratic Unionist Party (DUP). Leader: Jeffrey Donaldson. Radical populist unionist. Originally anti-Agreement.
- The Ulster Unionist Party (UUP). Leader: Doug Beattie. Moderate conservative unionist.
- The Progressive Unionist Party (PUP). Leader: Russell Watton. Moderate centre-left unionist. Political wing of Ulster Volunteer Force.
- The Conservative Party also organises and contests elections in Northern Ireland. Moderate unionist.

==== Anti-Agreement ====
- Traditional Unionist Voice (TUV). Leader: Jim Allister. Old school loyalist.

=== Other ===
- The Alliance Party of Northern Ireland. Leader: Naomi Long. Liberal cross-community. Pro-Agreement
- The Green Party. Environmentalist. Pro-Agreement.
- Ulster Third Way. Supports Northern Ireland independence.

== Political structures ==
=== Northern Ireland government ===
1921–1972

- Governor
- Prime Minister
- Cabinet

1998–

- First Minister and deputy First Minister
- Executive

=== Northern Ireland legislatures ===
1921–1972
The Parliament of Northern Ireland:

- House of Commons
- Senate

1972–1998

- The Northern Ireland Assembly (1973–1974)
- The Northern Ireland Constitutional Convention (1975–1976)
- The Northern Ireland Assembly (1982–1986)
- The Northern Ireland Forum (1996–1998)

1998–

- The Northern Ireland Assembly

=== Republic of Ireland government ===
- Taoiseach (prime minister)
- Department of Defence
- Department of Foreign Affairs and Trade
- Dáil Éireann (assembly)
- Seanad Éireann (senate)

=== United Kingdom government ===
- Prime Minister
- The Ministry of Defence (MOD)
- The Northern Ireland Office (NIO)
- The House of Commons
- The House of Lords
- The Northern Ireland Affairs Committee (House of Commons)
- The Northern Ireland Grand Committee (House of Commons)

== Peace process ==
=== Co-operative bodies ===
- British–Irish Council (BIC)
- British–Irish Inter-Parliamentary Body
- North/South Ministerial Council (NSMC)

=== Key steps in the peace process ===
- Sunningdale Agreement (1973)
- Anglo-Irish Agreement (1985)
- Downing Street Declaration (1993) and principle of consent
- Establishment of the IICD (1997)
- Belfast Agreement (1998)
- Amendment of Articles 2 and 3 (1999)
- Establishment of the Independent Monitoring Commission (2003)
- IRA ceasefire and decommissioning (2005)
- St Andrews Agreement (2006)

== Cultural and religious organisations ==
=== Religious ===
- Roman Catholic Church in Ireland
- Church of Ireland (Anglican)
- Presbyterian Church in Ireland
- Methodist Church in Ireland
- Free Presbyterian Church of Ulster

=== Sporting ===
- The Gaelic Athletic Association (GAA)

=== Politico-religious fraternal organisations ===
==== Unionist/Protestant ====
- The Apprentice Boys of Derry
- The Orange Institution
- The Independent Orange Order
- The Royal Black Institution

==== Nationalist/Catholic ====
- The Ancient Order of Hibernians (AOH)
