= Timeline of the Troubles in Great Britain =

This is a timeline of the events and actions during the Troubles that were carried out in Great Britain, the vast majority of which were carried out by Irish Republican paramilitaries. The Provisional IRA were by far the most active group, but both the Official IRA and the Irish National Liberation Army carried out a number of attacks, which included bombings and shootings. Ulster Loyalist paramilitary groups also carried out a small number of violent actions.

== List of actions/attacks 1970s ==
=== 1972 ===
- 22 February - 1972 Aldershot bombing The Official Irish Republican Army carried out a car bomb attack at the headquarters of the British Army's 16th Parachute Brigade and was claimed as a revenge attack for Bloody Sunday. Seven civilian staff (mostly female cleaners) were killed and 19 were wounded.

=== 1973 ===
- 8 March - 1973 Old Bailey bombing - The Provisional IRA conducted their first operations in England exploding two car bombs in the center of London. One bomb exploded outside the Old Bailey Courthouse, injuring 180 people and one man later died from a heart attack, the bomb exploded near Whitehall injuring about 30 other people, bringing the total injured for the day to over 200. Eight members of the IRA team were convicted for their roles in the bombings & received long prison terms, including Gerry Kelly and sisters Marian and Dolours Price.
- 3 April - A bomb exploded at a London sorting office in Paddington. A caller claimed the bombing was carried out by a group called "The Avengers" and said that they were not the IRA, but did belong to the Irish Republican movement.
- 18 August - The Provisional IRA began their first sustained bombing campaign in England, using mainly letter bombs sent by mail & firebombs planted in major cities around England. Between the 18 August - 28 September more than 40 bombs exploded in London, Birmingham and Manchester, other bombs were found and defused, 29 people were injured from the bombing campaign.
- 18 August - The IRA detonated two firebombs (incendiary devices) at Harrods Department store in London causing slight damage.
- 20 August - The IRA planted three incendiary devices in shops in New Street, Birmingham. No injuries.
- 21 August - Book bombs were received at a number of locations including the Old Bailey, the RAF Association in Chiswick, the Union Jack Club in Waterloo and the Northern Ireland Information Office in Central London. Ten incendiary devices were also discovered at a number of West End stores as well as one at Baker Street tube station (which was targeted again just over a week later), but none ignited.
- 22 August - A book bomb exploded at the Conservative Central Office in Westminster.
- 24 August - Two people are injured from a letter bomb sent to the London Stock Exchange. They were the first victims of the renewed IRA campaign in England.
- 25 August - Two men were injured when an IRA bomb exploded in the Bank of England in London. Another bomb was defused in a shop in Oxford Street.
- 27 August - An IRA letter bomb blew off the left hand of a female secretary in the British Embassy in Washington.
- 29 August - The IRA planted two bombs in Solihull and an incendiary device in Harrods in London.
- 30 August - Two Provisional IRA bombs exploded in Solihull town centre causing large damage but no injuries.
- 31 August - A bomb exploded in Old Quebec Street, Marble Arch damaging two hotels.
- September - The IRA detonate dozens of firebombs and letter bombs in cities around England during the month of September 1973 injuring over 20 people.
- 2 September - Two incendiary devices planted by the IRA in Birmingham were defused, one in Sherlock Street and the other Calthorpe Road, Edgbaston.

- 8 September - A bomb exploded at the ticket office in London Victoria station, five people were injured in the blast.
- 9 September - Several shops in Manchester were damaged by IRA firebombs.
- 10 September - King's Cross station and Euston station bombings The IRA detonated bombs at Kings Cross railway station and Euston railway station, 13 people were injured in total from both bombs.
- 12 September - Two Police officers were injured when an IRA bomb exploded at the offices of the Royal Naval Association in London. A woman collapsed and died during an evacuation following a hoax bomb alert at Euston Station in London.
- 12 September - The IRA exploded a bomb in a shopping-bag outside the offices of the Prudential Assurance Company, injuring six people, in Oxford Street in London.
- 13 September - An IRA bomb exploded at a Servicemen's headquarters in London.
- 15 September - A Provisional IRA device exploded in Oxford Street, London.
- 20 September - An IRA bomb exploded at the headquarters of the Duke of York barracks in Chelsea, London injuring five people, three civilians and two soldiers.
- 23 September - A British Army Captain died trying to defuse an IRA bomb planted in Birmingham city on Highfield Road. Captain Ronald Wilkinson (30) a member of the Hereford-based Royal Army Ordnance Corps Inspection and Disposal Unit was seriously injured when the bomb blew up in his face while trying to defuse it on the 17 September 1973, he died six days later in hospital on the 23 September. He was the first person to be killed directly from a Provisional IRA bomb planted in England.
- 2 October - An IRA firebomb caused damage to Heathrow Airport, another bomb exploded at Colchester, Essex.
- 4 October: Four people were injured when an IRA bomb exploded at a British Army careers office in London.
- 17 December - Brigadier MJP O'Cock injured his right hand when a postal device exploded at Collier House in London.
- 18 December - 1973 Westminster bombing: A bomb exploded in Thorney Street, which leads off Horseferry Road. The bomb was planted in a car which was known to have been stolen in London, and was parked outside Horseferry House, a building occupied by the Home Office, and opposite Thames House, which is mainly occupied by the Department of Trade and Industry. Both these buildings, and others nearby, were extensively damaged. At least 40 people were injured.
- 19 December - A person was injured when a postal device exploded at the GPO sorting office in London.
- 23 December: In a number of incidents bombs exploded at Kensington police station, Hammersmith offices of builders, George Wimpey and the White Lion public house on Tottenham Court Road.
- 24 December - The Provisional IRA left two packages which exploded almost simultaneously in the late evening on Christmas Eve. One was in the doorway of the North Star public house, at the junction of College Crescent and Finchley Road, Swiss Cottage, which exploded injuring six people, and the other exploded on the upstairs verandah of the nearby Swiss Cottage Tavern where an unspecified number of people were injured.
- 26 December - One person was injured when a bomb exploded at the Stage Door public house in London. A telephone kiosk was also badly damaged by a blast at Sloane Square tube station.

=== 1974 ===
- 1 January - Two bombs exploded in Birmingham city centre, causing minor damage.
- 3 January - Several bombs & incendiary devices explode in Birmingham, damaging the Victoria Law Courts on Corporation Street, the Ikon Gallery Cafe in Brindleyplace & the Royal Navy & Army Information Centre along with several nearby shops but caused no injuries.
- 5 January - Two bombs exploded within three minutes of each other. The first at Madame Tussauds, the second during the Boat Show at Earls Court Exhibition Centre. Police confirmed a telephone warning had been given shortly before both explosions allowing evacuations at both sites and there were no fatalities or injuries reported. It was later confirmed the devices had been planted by the IRA.
- 6 January - IRA active service units left bombs outside two senior British Army generals' homes. A 30 lb bomb was defused outside the home of General Sir Cecil Hugh Blacker and another exploded outside the empty home of Major General Sir Philip John Newling Ward, causing damage but no injury.
- 30 January - Three people were injured in three different IRA letter bombs. The first was sent to the Surrey residence of Judge Buzzard, the second to the Hertfordshire residence of Rt. Hon. Reginald Maudling. And the final device was sent to the offices of the Daily Express in Fleet Street, London.
- 2 February - The British MP Reginald Maudling had a letter bomb sent to his house by the IRA. It's believed the bomb was constructed by Shane Paul O'Doherty, an IRA expert bomb maker who sent dozens of letter bombs to England between 1973 and 1975.
- 4 February - M62 coach bombing An IRA bomb exploded aboard a bus carrying British soldiers and several of their family members in Yorkshire, killing nine soldiers and three civilians. At the time it was the highest number of deaths caused by an IRA bomb in England. A young woman named Judith Ward was wrongly convicted of this and other bombings in England and spent 18 years in jail until she was proven innocent in 1992 and released.
- 12 February - The IRA exploded a 50 lb bomb at the National Defence College at Latimer, Buckinghamshire. Ten people were injured in the blast.
- 26 March - An IRA unit used 25 lbs of explosives to bomb the British Army Claro Barracks in North Yorkshire causing large structural damage to the barracks.
- 7 April - The IRA carried out bombings in Birmingham and Manchester. No deaths or injuries.
- 9 April - Three IRA Volunteers shot dead John Stevenson, a British Army commanding officer of the All Arms Training Area in Otterburn British Army base, he was shot dead in his home near the base in Northumberland, England.
- 13 April - Kenneth Lennon was found shot dead in Chipstead, Surrey. Nobody claimed responsibility for the killing but Lennon was an IRA informer who had been rumoured to have been working for M16, it's possible an IRA unit tracked him down & shot him.
- 11 June - The IRA exploded a bomb at Queen Elizabeth Barracks in Strensall, North Yorkshire, causing extensive damage but no injuries or deaths.
- 17 June - Houses of Parliament 1974 bombing The Provisional IRA bombed the British Houses of Parliament causing extensive damage, a large fire and ended up injuring 11 civilians.
- 14 July - The IRA carry out bombings in Birmingham and Manchester.
- 15 July - The IRA carried out five attacks with incendiary devices around Birmingham and the Black Country. An attack on the Routunda building caused £250,000 worth of damages in broken glass whilst business's in Smethwick, Nechells & Curzon Street were also targeted.
- 17 July - The Provisional IRA bombed the Tower of London killing one man, injuring 40 people and causing extensive damage to the Tower.
- 23 July - IRA 1974 British Airways bombing attempt. No deaths or injuries.
- 23 July - Two IRA firebombs destroyed two stores in Birmingham City. The first exploded at Maples furnishing store on Corporation Street. The second exploded at Levins furniture store at Sparkhill. Several other firebombs were found in a store in the Hall Green area of Birmingham which were defused & made safe.
- 26 July - As part of the IRA's Midlands campaign, a firebomb exploded at a shop-fitters at Aston in Birmingham. The Harris and Sheldon building on corner of Priory Road in Aston sustained minor damage.
- August - In August 1974 the Provisional IRA's Balcombe Street Gang was sent to London as "sleeper cells" awaiting instructions to start operations in London & surrounding areas like Surrey & Kent.
- 5 October - Guildford pub bombings The Provisional IRA's Balcombe Street Gang exploded two time bombs in Guildford pubs in Surrey that were popular with local soldiers. Five people were killed at the Horse & Groom pub (4 soldiers & 1 civilian) and 65 others injured. This was the start of a sustained campaign by the IRA unit in London and southern England.
- 11 October - IRA Bombs explode at Victory Services Club and Army and Navy Club. One injured.
- 22 October - Brook's bombing The IRA threw a bomb into Brook's club injuring three people.
- 24 October - The IRA bombed a cottage in the grounds of Harrow public school which used to house the head of the school's Combined Cadet Force, which was the bomber's target. Nobody was hurt in the attack. This was the first time the unit gave a telephoned warning before a bombing occurred. See: Harrow School bombing
- 5 November - An IRA bomb exploded at the Conservative Party offices in Edmund Street, Birmingham, injuring one person a security guard. Also on the same night a bomb exploded in the center of Wolverhampton, but there were no injuries.
- 7 November - Kings Arms, Woolwich bombing The Provisional IRA's Balcombe Street Gang threw a bomb through the window of the Kings Arms pub in Woolwich. The blast killed a soldier and a barman and injured about 35 people.
- 14 November - James Patrick McDade, lieutenant in the Birmingham Battalion, of the Provisional Irish Republican Army (IRA) was killed in a premature explosion whilst planting a bomb at the Coventry telephone exchange in 1974. Along with the death of McDade another IRA Volunteer named Raymond McLaughlin was arrested near the scene of the bombing & was subsequently convicted for the Coventry bomb. There were three further IRA bomb explosions in England that day. The RAF Club in Northampton was badly gutted by a firebomb, the Conservative Club in Solihull was damaged by a bomb, and a timber yard in Ladywood in Birmingham was also subjected to a bombing.
- 21 November - Birmingham pub bombings An IRA unit active in Birmingham planted two bombs in pubs in Birmingham city. The IRA warnings were too late and 21 people were killed in the explosions, a further 182 people were injured. A third bomb was planted in the city but defused.
- 25 - 27 November - 1974 London pillar box bombings On 25 and 27 November 1974 the Provisional IRA placed several bombs in pillar boxes and one in a hedge behind a pillar box around London, including bombs at Tite Street, Piccadilly Circus, Victoria Street & Caledonian Road, 40 people were injured in total from the several bombs.
- 30 November - The IRA threw two bombs into Talbots Arms pub in Little Chester Street, injuring eight people. See: Talbot Arms pub bombing
- 11 December - The IRA threw a bomb into the Long Bar of the Naval and Military Club in Piccadilly. Later on there was an IRA gun attack on the London Cavalry Club. Nobody was hurt in either attack.
- 14 December - The IRA carried out a gun attack on the Churchill Hotel in London. Three people were injured in the attack.
- 17 December - The IRA planted three time bombs at telephone exchanges in London. One person George Arthur (34) who worked as a post office telephonist was killed in the blast.
- 18 December - 1974 Bristol bombing - Two IRA bombs exploded in Bristol shops injuring 20 people.
- 19 December - Oxford Street bombing The Balcombe Street Gang used a car bomb for the first time, outside Selfridges department store on Oxford Street. The bomb caused £1.5 million worth of damage. There was 100 lbs of high explosives in the car, the biggest bomb the IRA had used in England at that time.
- 20 December - A bomb left by the IRA at a railway station in Aldershot was defused.
- 21 December - The IRA firebombed Harrods department store. A second bomb at the King's Arms public house in Warminster, Wiltshire was defused.
- 22 December - The IRA unit threw a bomb into the flat of former British Prime Minister Edward Heath. Heath was not home at the time of the attack and there were no injuries.
- 23 December - IRA Volunteer Ronnie McCartney a member of the IRA's Southampton active service unit (formerly a member of a IRA London active service unit) while being chased by the police fired shots at three policemen in Portswood, Southampton causing injury to one, Malcolm Craig. McCartney was eventually captured & spent 21 years in jail. Some 30+ years later the two men came face to face for a reconciliation meeting in a BBC documentary called "Facing The Truth" which former South African Archbishop Desmond Tutu mediated.

=== 1975 ===
- 19 January - The IRA's Balcombe Street unit fired shots into two hotels, first the Carlton Tower Hotel was shot at & then the Portman Hotel. 12 people were injured in total.
- 23 January - The Balcombe Street gang exploded a time bomb at the Woodford Waterworks pumping station in North London. Three People were injured in the blast.
- 27 January - The Balcombe Street Gang planted seven time-bombs at multiple spots in London. At 6:30 pm a bomb exploded at Gieves, in Old Bond Street. At 9:30 pm bombs exploded at the Moreson chemical plant in Ponders End and a disused gas works in Enfield. Only minimal damage was caused by these two bombs. Two further bombs exploded in Kensington High Street and Victoria Street. A warning was given of a bomb in Putney High Street and a British Army bomb-disposal officer was able to defuse the device. A warning was also given for a bomb in Hampstead and it was defused. Two people were injured from the Kensington High Street bomb.
- 26 February - Murder of Stephen Tibble - Constable Stephen Tibble was shot dead by IRA volunteer Liam Quinn while Tibble was chasing him.
- 9 July - Three IRA Volunteers were arrested after a brief siege in Hope Street, Liverpool. Det Sergeant Tom Davies was seriously injured when he was shot in the stomach by one of the IRA volunteers. Another officer received more minor injuries when an IRA volunteer fired at the sergeant, but the bullet ricocheted off the ground and hit Davies in the head.
- 27 August - Caterham Arms pub bombing The IRA bombed a soldiers' pub in Caterham, Surrey. 33 people were injured, including ten soldiers, one of whom lost their leg. The police said it was a carbon copy of the bombs used in Guildford pubs back in October 1974. This was the beginning of a new sustained bombing campaign by the IRA in England.
- 28 August - Seven people were injured when a bomb exploded at a Peter Browns Outfitters in Oxford Street, London.
- 29 August - A bomb disposal officer Roger Goad was killed in Kensington, London outside a shoe shop, trying to defuse an IRA booby-trap bomb
- 30 August - A bomb exploded in the doorway of the National Westminster Bank in High Holborn, no injures.
- 5 September - London Hilton bombing - Two civilians are killed and 63 are injured.
- 15 September - Pamela Onslow, Countess of Onslow was injured by a postal device at Chilcott Avenue, another person was person was injured by a similar device at Alcan Aluminium Ltd in London.
- 22 September - Three people were injured when a IRA time bomb exploded outside the Portman Hotel in London's West End.
- 25 September - Two policemen were injured when a device exploded at the Hare and Hounds public house in Kent.
- 25 September - A bomb exploded outside a bank in High Holborn, London, no injuries.
- 9 October - 1975 Piccadilly bombing One civilian is killed and 20 injured in an IRA bomb attack outside Green Park tube station.
- 13 October - A IRA bomb planted outside Locket's Restaurant in London is defused by explosive officers.
- 23 October - The IRA planted a booby-trap bomb under the car of Conservative MP Hugh Fraser. A passer-by (Gordon Hamilton Fairley) noticed the bomb under the car, and by mistake detonated the device, killing himself.
- 29 October - Trattoria Fiore bombing - 17 civilians are injured in an IRA bombing in a West End restaurant.
- 3 November - Three people were injured, including solicitor, Richard Charnley, when a bomb placed under his car exploded at Connaught Square, London.
- 12 November - Scott's Oyster Bar bombing One person is killed and 15 others injured when the IRA threw a bomb into a Mayfair restaurant.
- 18 November - Walton's Restaurant bombing - Two people were killed and 23 injured when the IRA threw a bomb into another Mayfair restaurant
- 27 November - The IRA Balcombe Street unit shot dead Guinness Book of Records founder Ross McWhirter at his London home.
- 20 December - A bomb exploded at Biddy Mulligan's pub in Kilburn, London, injuring five people. The pub was said to have been frequented by Irish republican sympathizers. The Ulster Defence Association (UDA) claimed one of its "associate units" carried out the attack.

=== 1976 ===
- 29 January - Twelve small bombs exploded overnight in London, starting several fires and injuring one person. Police later found a thirteenth bomb that had failed to go off.
- 12 February - Frank Stagg died after 62 days on hunger strike in Wakefield Prison.
- 13 February - Police defused a 30-pound (14 kg) bomb found at Oxford Circus station.
- 1 March - IRA Volunteer Paddy Hackett is badly injured when a bomb he is carrying prematurely detonated at Stanhope Gardens, Kensington, London, blowing off one of his arms and a part off one of his legs.
- 4 March - Nine people were injured when a 10-pound (4.5 kg) bomb exploded near Cannon Street station, injuring eight passengers on a nearby train. The IRA released a statement: "We now issue a solemn warning to the British public. You have given the IRA the label of terrorist... Now we will act as terrorists."
- 15 March - An IRA bomb exploded on a Metropolitan line train at West Ham station, on the Hammersmith & City section of the line. The bomber, Vincent Donnelly, possibly took the wrong train and attempted to return to his destination. However, the bomb detonated prior to reaching the City of London. Donnelly shot Peter Chalk, a Post Office engineer, and shot and killed the train's driver Julius Stephen, who had attempted to catch the perpetrator. Donnelly then shot himself, but survived and was apprehended by police.
- 16 March - An empty train was severely damaged by a bomb at Wood Green station. The train was about to pick up fans from an Arsenal football match, but the bomb detonated prior to arriving at the station, injuring one passenger standing on the platform. Three men were sentenced to 20 years imprisonment for this attack.
- 27 March - A bomb placed by the Provisional IRA exploded in a litter bin at the top of an escalator in a crowded exhibition hall, Earl's Court. Over 15,000 people were attending the Daily Mail Ideal Home Exhibition at the time. Over 80 people were injured, 4 people lost limbs.

=== 1977 ===
- 29 January - The Provisional IRA exploded seven bombs in London's West End, causing large structural damage to a number of buildings. A bomb on Oxford Street inside Selfridges Department Store set a huge fire to the premises. About £500,000 was caused in damages,

=== 1978 ===
- 17 December - Provisional IRA bombs exploded in Manchester, Liverpool, Coventry, Bristol and Southampton, a bomb that exploded at Maggs Department Store in Clifton, Bristol injured 18 people.

=== 1979 ===
- 17 February - The Ulster Volunteer Force (UVF) bombed two pubs frequented by Irish Catholics in Glasgow, Scotland. Both pubs were wrecked and a number of people were wounded. It said it bombed the pubs because they were used for Irish republican fundraising, both pubs strongly denied this.
- 30 March - Shadow Northern Ireland Secretary Airey Neave was killed as he left the House of Commons car park by a booby-trapped car bomb planted by the Irish National Liberation Army (INLA) in 1979. The INLA released a statement in their monthly paper on the attack:
  In March, retired terrorist and supporter of capital punishment, Airey Neave, got a taste of his own medicine when an INLA unit pulled off the operation of the decade and blew him to bits inside the 'impregnable' Palace of Westminster. The nauseous Margaret Thatcher snivelled on television that he was an 'incalculable loss'—and so he was—to the British ruling class.
  ,
- 1 - 8 June - A number of letter bombs were sent to parts of Birmingham, injuring four postal workers in separate incidents, in the first week of June.
- 13 December - Three more letter bombs exploded in Birmingham.

== List of actions/attacks 1980s ==
=== 1980 ===
- 7 March - The INLA planted two 10 lb bombs at Netheravon British Army camp in the Salisbury Plain Training Area. Only one bomb detonated & caused damage starting a fire, injuring two soldiers.
- 2 December - An IRA bomb exploded at Princess Louise Regiment Territorial Army Centre, Hammersmith Road, London W6, injuring five people.

=== 1981 ===
- 10 October - Chelsea Barracks bombing - Two civilians are killed and over 20 British soldiers are injured in an IRA bombing outside Chelsea Barracks.
- 17 October - Lieutenant-general Sir Steuart Pringle was injured in an explosion at his home in Dulwich, London by a car bomb planted by the IRA. Sir Pringle lost a leg in the bombing.
- 26 October - The Provisional IRA bombed a Wimpy Bar on Oxford Street, killing Kenneth Howorth, the Metropolitan Police explosives officer attempting to defuse it.
- 13 November - The IRA bombed the home of Sir Michael Havers. Havers represented the Crown in two of the most notable miscarriages of justice in British judicial history: the trial and appeal of the Guildford Four and also of the Maguire family (known as the Maguire Seven), all of whom were wrongfully convicted. Collectively, they served a total of 113 years in prison and one of the Maguire Seven, Giuseppe Conlon, died in prison, convicted on the basis of discredited forensic evidence. Havers and his family were in Spain at the time of the bombing.
- 23 November - The IRA detonated a bomb which exploded at the Royal Artillery Barracks HQ, Government House, Woolwich New Road, London SE18. Two people were injured in the blast.

=== 1982 ===
- 20 July - Hyde Park and Regent's Park bombings - Eleven British soldiers are killed in an IRA double car bomb attack at Hyde & Regent's parks, over 50 are injured.

=== 1983 ===
- 10 December - 1983 Royal Artillery Barracks bombing On 10 December 1983 a bomb exploded at the Royal Artillery Barracks in Woolwich, South East London. The explosion injured five people and caused minor damage to the building. The IRA claimed they carried out the attack.
- 17 December - Harrods bombing - In London an IRA car bomb explodes outside Harrods store, six people are killed (three civilians and three police officers) and over 90 people, civilians & police are injured.

=== 1984 ===
- 12 October - Brighton hotel bombing - The IRA attempted to assassinate the then British Prime Minister Margaret Thatcher who was staying in the Brighton hotel ahead of the Tory party conference. Thatcher managed to escape with very minor injuries, but five people were killed in the blast and over 30 were injured, some badly.

=== 1985 ===
- 23 June 1985 - A bomb was found at the Rubens Hotel, a tourist hotel near Buckingham Palace, and made safe, based on information obtained following the arrest of 12 people including Patrick Magee who was wanted in connection with the bombing of the Grand Hotel in Brighton in September 1984. It was believed to be part of a campaign and hotels in resorts throughout Britain were searched.
- 12 November - Two bombs planted by the INLA were defused outside Chelsea Barracks in London.

=== 1988 ===
- 1 August - the Inglis Barracks bombing - A British soldier was killed and another nine injured when the IRA exploded a time bomb outside Inglis Barracks in Mill Hill, London.

=== 1989 ===
- 20 February - Clive Barracks bombing - The Clive barracks bombing was a bomb attack carried out by the IRA at Clive Barracks, Ternhill, Shropshire, England. Only two people were injured in the attack but a good deal of structural damages was done.
- 22 September - The Deal barracks bombing was a bomb attack by the Provisional Irish Republican Army on the Royal Marine Depot, Deal, England. 11 Royal Marines were killed and 22 injured.
- 19 October - The Guildford Four who were wrongfully convicted of the October 1974 Guildford pub bombings which killed five people, were released from prison after they had their convictions quashed. The group known as the Maguire Seven, who were convicted of providing bombs and explosive material to the Guildford Four had their convictions quashed separately in 1991. Both groups were exonerated with a public apology from former Prime Minister Tony Blair in 2015.
- 15 November: a Semtex bomb targeting British Army Lieutenant-general Sir David Ramsbotham was spotted and defused by police in Kelso Place, Kensington, west London. The IRA unit mistook their target and attached the bomb to a car of one of Ramsbotham's neighbors car instead.
- 18 November - a British Army staff sergeant lost both legs and his wife was also injured by an IRA bomb planted under the wheel-arch of their car in Colchester, England.

== List of actions/attacks 1990s ==
=== 1990 ===
- 20 February - The IRA bombed a British military van in Leicester City Centre, England. The Semtex bomb was placed under the van, two people were injured in the blast.
- 14 May - 1990 Eltham bombing - An IRA bomb attack on an army education office in Eltham, southeast London injured seven people.
- 16 May - 1990 Wembley bombing The IRA planted a bomb underneath a minibus at an army recruiting centre in Wembley, northwest London on 16 May 1990, killing a soldier and injuring four others.
- 22 May - After a high speed chase, a suspected IRA man was captured by police in North London with two loaded AK47 assault rifles in his car.
- 3 June - Lichfield gun attack - An IRA active service unit ambushed three off-duty British soldiers while they waiting at Lichfield City railway station in Staffordshire, killing 1 soldier and seriously injuring the 2 others.
- 9 June - Honourable Artillery Company bombing - 19 people were injured when the IRA exploded a bomb inside the Armoury House hall of the Honourable Artillery Company's (HAC) military barracks in London, England
- 13 June - An IRA bomb damaged the recently vacated 18th-century West Green House, home of Conservative Party figure & Thatcher friend, Lord McAlpine in Hartley Wintney, in Hampshire.
- 21 June - The IRA bombed the Royal Air Force (RAF) base at Stanmore in North London. There were no injuries.
- 26 June - Carlton Club bombing - The IRA bombed the Carlton Club, St James's, Central London, which is popular with Conservative MPs. 20 people were injured in the blast and Lord Kaberry of Adel died of a heart attack caused by the bombing. In a statement, the IRA said: "Like Brighton in 1984, the IRA has brought the war directly to those who keep the British Army on the streets and in the fields of Ireland. While such occupation continues, and the Nationalist people face daily oppression, the policy makers and their military arm will not be safe." The bomb contained 15 lb of Semtex explosives.
- 20 July - London Stock Exchange bombing - the IRA exploded a large bomb inside the London Stock Exchange. A 40-minute warning was giving and there was no injuries, but large structural damage was caused.
- 30 July - Ian Gow, Conservative MP for Eastbourne, was assassinated by the IRA when a booby trap bomb exploded under his car at his home in East Sussex. The IRA said he was murdered due to his role in British policy decisions in Northern Ireland.
- 17 September - The IRA admitted responsibility for the shooting of a British Army sergeant Bernard Cox at Finchley in north London. Margaret Thatcher, said that it was just one more barbaric act carried out in a cowardly way.
- 10 September - An IRA active service unit bombed a Military and Navy recruiting office in Derby. There were no reported injuries.
- 18 September - An IRA team attempted to kill Air Chief Marshal Sir Peter Terry at his Staffordshire home. Terry had been a prime target since his days as Governor of Gibraltar, in which capacity he signed the documents allowing the SAS to operate against IRA volunteers in 1988. The revenge attack took place at 9 pm at the Main Road house. The gunman opened fire through a window, hitting him at least nine times and injuring his wife, Lady Betty, near the eye. The couple's daughter, Elizabeth, was found suffering from shock. Peter Terry's face had to be rebuilt as the shots shattered his face, and two high-velocity bullets lodged a fraction of an inch from his brain.

=== 1991 ===
- 7 February - The IRA carried out a mortar attack of 10 Downing Street, in an attempt to assassinate Prime Minister John Major and his cabinet. One of the shells exploded in the back garden of 10 Downing Street; there were no deaths, but four people were slightly injured.
- 18 February - Bombings of Paddington and Victoria stations - The IRA exploded two bombs at underground stations in Central London, one person was killed and another 38 injured from the second bomb.
- 25 February - The IRA detonated a bomb on a railway line in Napsbury Lane St. Albans, England. The attack occurred on the railway line between St. Albans and Radlett. There were no injuries or deaths.
- 14 March - The Birmingham Six - who were wrongfully convicted of the 1974 Birmingham pub bombings which killed 21 people - were freed from prison after their convictions were quashed.
- 5 April - The IRA planted ten incendiary devices around stores in Manchester, which caused fires in several stores & shops.
- 27 June - IRA bomb was discovered and defused outside the Beck Theatre, Hayes, West London. A 30 lbs Semtex bomb was found in a brown holdall outside the theatre, it was designed to kill members of the Blues and Royals band who were a part of the British Army's Household Cavalry Regiment, the bomb was twice the size of the one was used in the Deal barracks bombing which killed 11 Royal Marines in September 1989.
- 7 July - IRA volunteers Nessan Quinlivan (26) and Pearse McAuley (25) escape from HM Prison Brixton using a pistol they smuggled into the prison.
- 15 November - Two IRA Volunteers died when the bomb they were carrying exploded prematurely near St Albans, Hertfordshire. One civilian was injured in the blast See: Patricia Black (Irish republican)#St Albans.
- 1 December - IRA incendiary devices detonated in three furniture shops in London's Tottenham Court Road and a furniture discount warehouse in north London. The attacks cause damage but no injuries.
- 2 December - An IRA incendiary device ignited at Littlewoods, Oxford Street, London W1. No injuries occurred.
- 7-8 December - On the 7 December night & early 8 December morning IRA firebombs exploded at shopping stores around Blackpool.Nobody was injured in the attack.
- 8 December - seven incendiary devices exploded in the Manchester Arndale shopping centre in England, causing severe damage There were no injuries.
- 10 - December - The IRA planted 16 incendiary devices in Blackpool, at least 10 of which started fires. Another 20 devices are found near the Manchester Arndale shopping center. There are no injuries.
- 16, December - The IRA plants incendiary devices at Brent Cross shopping center in north London and the city's National Gallery. No one injured.
  - The IRA detonated a bomb on a railway line near Clapham Junction in southwest London at 6.00 am. A 20 minute warning wa given & there were no injuries but bombing caused all main-line London station to close disrupting travel for a huge number of commuters and causing significant economic damage.
- 23 December - the IRA detonated incendiary devices at the Neasden Underground Depot and on a train at Harrow-on-the-Hill station, causing no injuries.

=== 1992 ===
- 10 January - A small 5 lb (2.3 kg) bomb left in a briefcase by the IRA exploded 300 metres away from Downing Street, London. No injuries were reported
- 28 February - An IRA bomb injured 29 people at London Bridge. See: 1992 London Bridge bombing
- 29 February - An IRA bomb exploded at the Crown Prosecution Service, London EC4, injuring two people.
- 1 March: A small device was discovered at White Hart Lane railway station Tottenham, London N17 and defused.
- 6 April: A device exploded outside a building housing various offices at Bridle Lane, near Piccadilly Circus, London W1.
- 10 April - Baltic Exchange bombing The IRA explode a massive Semtex bomb in the heart of London's financial district, killing three people, injuring over 90 and causing over £800 million worth of damage - £200 million more than all the bombs detonated in Ireland in the previous 23 years.
- 11 April - 1992 Staples Corner bombing - The IRA detonated a large van bomb at Staples Corner, North West London, causing a lot damage but not deaths or injuries. The bombing happened only hours after the Baltic Exchange bomb.
- 14 April - the INLA shot a British soldier (Michael Newman) outside a recruiting office in Derby, England. He died of his wounds the following day.
- 7 June - IRA volunteer Paul Magee and another IRA volunteer shot dead Special Constable Glenn Goodman on the A46 near Tadcaster, North Yorkshire and seriously injured PC Kelly, shooting him four times.
- 18 June - 1992 Leeds bombing - The INLA exploded four incendiary devices around Leeds city causing £50,000 worth of damage, other devices were found and defused. Two INLA volunteers were convicted of conspiracy to cause arson, Eamonn O'Donnell was jailed for twenty years and Sean Cruickshank for 15 years.
- 17 September - The authorities blamed the IRA for carrying out firebomb attacks at several tourist venues in London. Devices exploded at Madame Tussaud's waxworks, The Planetarium, and the Imperial War Museum. There were no injuries reported from any of the attacks.
- 12 October - Sussex Arms pub bombing - The IRA exploded a time bomb in the Sussex Arms pub killing one person and injuring four others.
- 19 October: Small device exploded under the wheel arch of a coach parked outside the Novotel Hotel, Shortlands, Hammersmith W6. No casualties. Device exploded under a car at Oxenden Street, London SW1. Two people treated for shock.
- 14 November: Stoke Newington Road lorry bomb: A IRA van discovered in Stoke Newington Road, London N16 containing a very large improvised explosive device. One policeman was shot and injured confronting two men.
- 15 November: The IRA planted a bomb at Canary Wharf in the Docklands. The device was spotted by security guards and was deactivated safely.
- 16 November: A IRA device in van in Collingwood Street, Bethnal Green E1 was made safe.
- 3 December - 1992 Manchester bombing - Two IRA bombs exploded in Manchester injuring a total of 65 people.
- 10 December - Wood Green Shopping City bombing - The IRA detonated two bombs in litter bins injuring a total of 11 people (4 police officers & 7 civilians).
- 17 December: A bomb hidden in a litter bin in a third-floor men's lavatory of the John Lewis department store, Oxford Street, London, by the IRA detonated just after 11 am. A second IRA bomb exploded 15 minutes later at the rear of the store, in Cavendish Square, while shoppers and staff were still being evacuated. Four people were injured.

=== 1993 ===
- 28 January - 1993 Harrods bombing - The IRA exploded a bomb in a litter bin outside Harrods in London, injuring four people. Two Englishmen (Jan Taylor & Patrick Hayes) linked to the revolutionary socialist group Red Action were later arrested for the bombing.
- 27 February - 1993 Camden Town bombing - The IRA exploded a bomb in a litter bin in Camden Town in London. The steel litter bin acted as shrapnel injuring 18 people.
- 20 March - Warrington bombings - The IRA exploded two bombs in litter bins in Bridge Street in Warrington, Cheshire, due to confusing warnings phoned in by the bombers two boys Johnathan Ball (3) and Tim Parry (12) were killed in the bombings and 56 people were injured. There was widespread protests in both England and Ireland over these bombings.
- 24 April - 1993 Bishopsgate bombing - The IRA exploded a large truck bomb which was estimated to have contained over a tone of high explosives in it outside Bishopsgate in the City of London, killing a man, injuring 44 people & causing over £350 million worth of damage. It was probably the largest IRA bomb detonated in England at that point.
- 2 October - 1993 Finchley Road bombings - The IRA exploded several bombs on Finchley Road in Hampstead, London. Five people were injured.
- 21 December - A series of Provisional IRA coded bomb warnings closed 40 British Rail stations, paralysed large sections of London Underground, affected more than 350,000 commuters and cost the capital's economy an estimated £34 million. London Underground evacuated 50,000 to 60,000 people from 100 Tube stations in 15 minutes at the height of the morning rush hour. About 300,000 rail commuters were either stranded in trains or found services cancelled. Deliberately vague warnings followed an IRA tactic to cause widespread travel disruption was in and around the capital.

=== 1994 ===
- 27 January - IRA bombs exploded in three shops along Oxford Street, London. One travel shop was destroyed in one of the blasts.
- 18 to 22 February 1994 - Incendiary devices and one small bomb were planted in various London shops: a record shop at 157 Charing Cross Road WC2; Topshop, Oxford Circus W1; Hennes, Oxford Circus W1; a newsagents (which was destroyed), Great Cumberland Place W1; Burtons, New Oxford Street WC1; Burtons, Regent Street W1; Liberty's, Regent Street W1; Mr. Byrite, Oxford Circus W1; and Mr. Handy, Edgware Road W2. Some devices ignited causing damage. Others were discovered and made safe. No injuries occurred.
- 9 - 13 March - Heathrow mortar attacks - The IRA fired mortars at Heathrow Airport on the 9, 11 and 13 March. Nobody was injured in the attacks.
- 3 August - In Bognor Regis a bomb attached to a bicycle exploded outside a Woolworths store causing damage to a number of shops but causing no injuries. A similar device was found outside a shop in Brighton & defused. The IRA later claimed to have planted both bombs. The IRA said it planted the bombs to mark the 25 anniversary of British troops arriving in Northern Ireland.
- 22 August - A high explosive device was defused outside a Laura Ashley shop in Regent Street, London. The IRA claimed responsibility. This was the last explosive device planted by the IRA before its 1994 ceasefire.

=== 1996 ===
- 9 February - 1996 Docklands bombing At 19:01 the IRA ended its 18-month ceasefire from August 1994 when they exploded a massive truck bomb in the Docklands area in Canary Wharf. Two people were killed in the explosion, other people were injured and massive damage was caused. The blast caused an estimated £150 million worth of damage and cost insurers £170 million.
- 15 February - A small bomb in a telephone kiosk planted at the junction of Charing Cross Road & Lichfield Street, London was defused in a controlled explosion.
- 18 February - Aldwych bus bombing An IRA bomb exploded prematurely in Aldwych, killing the IRA volunteer handling it - Edward O'Brien - and injuring another eight people on the bus.
- 9 March - A small high explosive device planted by the IRA detonated on the Brompton Road, London.
- 18 April - A small PIRA bomb exploded at the Boltons in Earls Court, London, no injuries or deaths were reported.
- 24 April - 1996 Hammersmith Bridge bombing - The IRA planted two bombs on Hammersmith Bridge in West London. The devices failed to off properly and only very slight damage was done to the bridge.
- 15 June - 1996 Manchester bombing The IRA exploded a massive truck bomb in Manchester along Corporation Street near the Arndale Centre. The bomb weighed over 3,300 pounds of explosives which was the largest bomb the IRA ever detonated in England, the blast caused massive damage to the centre of the city of Manchester causing an estimated by insurers at £700 million (equivalent to £1.2 billion in 2016) – surpassed only by the 2001 September 11 attacks and the 1993 Bishopsgate bombing in terms of financial cost. Over 200 people were injured in the blast.
- 23 September - London police shot dead Provisional IRA volunteer Diarmuid O'Neill during a raid on his home.

=== 1997 ===
- 26 March - the IRA carried out a double bomb attack on a mainline railway and signal box in Wilmslow, Cheshire. There was also a hoax bomb alert on the main Doncaster line. The attacks caused major and widespread railway and traffic disruption.
- 5 April - A hoax bomb warning led to the cancellation of the Grand National race that year at Aintree.
- 25 April - Two small devices were detonated under a pylon on the M6 motorway. Major disruption was caused to the roads as well as Luton Airport which had to be evacuated over PIRA hoax bomb warnings.
- 29 April - Six motorways & three airports were disrupted as a result of PIRA bomb warnings which turned out to be hoaxes, Gatwick & Heathrow airports were among those partially evacuated. This was the PIRA's last action in Britain, the group would call its final ceasefire less than two months later in July 1997 & formally ended its campaign in 2005 with all its units being stood down.

== See also ==
- The Troubles
- Timeline of the Northern Ireland Troubles and peace process
- Timeline of the Troubles in the Republic of Ireland
- List of bombings during the Northern Ireland Troubles and peace process
- Outline of the Troubles
- Timeline of the Troubles in Europe

== Sources ==
- Jack Holland, Henry McDonald, INLA – Deadly Divisions'
- CAIN project: A Chronology of the Conflict
- Terrorist Incidents (Hansard 4 March 1996)
- Peter Taylor - Behind The Mask: The IRA and Sinn Fein
- David McKittrick Lost Lives (1999)
