= Donna Maguire =

IRA member

- Born: 1967 (age 58–59); Newry, County Down, Northern Ireland
- Organisation: Provisional Irish Republican Army

Donna Maguire (born c. 1967 in Newry, County Down, Northern Ireland) is a former volunteer in the Provisional Irish Republican Army (IRA) once described as Europe's most dangerous woman.

A former convent girl from Newry, Maguire joined the IRA and, according to The Independent newspaper, was trained by Dessie Grew. In early 1989 she travelled to Europe as part of an IRA active service unit based in The Hague and Hanover. On 12 July 1989 Maguire and Leonard Hardy were arrested at Rosslare, County Wexford after arriving on a ferry from Cherbourg, and mercury switches, explosives and photographs of British Army bases in Germany were seized. At their trial at the Special Criminal Court in Dublin in February 1990, Maguire was acquitted of possession of explosives, but Hardy was sentenced to five years' imprisonment. German authorities had requested Maguire's extradition in relation to a bombing at a British Army barracks at Osnabrück on 19 June 1989 and the killing of a British soldier in a car bomb attack in Hanover several days later, but she was not re-arrested when she left court and she immediately returned to Europe.

Maguire was arrested in Belgium near the border with the Netherlands on 16 June 1990, after a farmer reported hearing gunshots in the woods and two handguns, a machine gun and explosives were found nearby. A second IRA member was arrested with Maguire but escaped across the border before being captured by Dutch police, who also arrested a second man who had been travelling with Maguire. Maguire was extradited to the Netherlands on 6 December 1990. In March 1991, she was acquitted of the murder of two Australian tourists mistaken for off-duty British soldiers in Roermond in May 1990, a decision which was upheld at an appeal in July of the same year. On 7 October 1991 Maguire was extradited to Germany.

While on trial in Düsseldorf on charges relating to the June 1990 murder of a British soldier in Dortmund, German authorities announced on 16 November 1992 she was also being charged with attempted murder over the 1989 Osnabrück bombing. On 9 June 1994 Maguire and three other IRA members were acquitted of the Dortmund murder although the judge said it was "clear they are members of the IRA and trained as IRA volunteers", and also acquitted of involvement in the May 1990 bombing of a British Army base in Hanover. She was remanded into custody to await trial on other charges relating to the 1989 Osnabrück bombing, and in June 1995 received a nine-year prison sentence after being found guilty of attempted murder, explosives offences and spying on British Army bases in Germany with intent to sabotage. Due to the length of time spent in custody on remand—during the trial she became the longest-serving remand prisoner in German legal history—Maguire walked free from the court.

On 17 January 1996, Maguire received £13,500 compensation due to a 1985 accident in Newry, when she tripped over a broken paving stone. She told the court "I have had to give up dancing, jogging and swimming because the ankle swells up. I can't wear high heels and the ankle is not very stable when I walk on rough ground or gravel". The compensation award was described as a disgrace by Ulster Unionist Party MP Ken Maginnis, and Conservative Party MP David Wilshire said it was shocking and obscene and called for the law to be changed. Colin Parry, who received £7,500 after the death of his 12-year-old son in the Warrington bomb attacks, called for a review of the compensation system saying "It's a kick in the teeth. Every time these judgments come along, it reminds us how little society appears to value a child's life".

Maguire married Hardy in County Louth in July 1996, and she has three children. Hardy was arrested in August 2005 while on a family holiday in Torremolinos, Spain and extradited to Germany in January 2006 to face charges over his role in the 1989 Osnabrück bombing. In April 2006 Hardy was found guilty of attempted murder and deliberately causing an explosion and was sentenced to six years' imprisonment. It later transpired that Hardy was not sent to prison and had left the court via a side door with Maguire, and a spokesperson for the Federal Ministry of Justice issued a statement saying that "Leonard Hardy is not in detention".

In January 2015, it was announced that Leonard Hardy and Maguire had been arrested by Spanish police in Lanzarote as part of an investigation into money laundering and smuggling. Five other people were also arrested, and 11 searches were carried out in the provinces of Las Palmas, Alicante, Málaga and Murcia. They said it involved properties with an estimated value of 10.5 million euros.

== See also ==
- Timeline of the Troubles in Europe
