= 1988 IRA attacks in the Netherlands =

Attacks on British soldiers in Limburg

1988 IRA attacks in Netherlands
- Part of the Troubles
- 1988 IRA attacks in the Netherlands (Netherlands)
- Location: 51°12′0″N 5°59′0″E; Roermond and Nieuw-Bergen, Limburg, Netherlands
- Date: 1 May 1988
- Target: RAF personnel
- Attack type: Shooting, bombing
- Deaths: 3
- Injuries: 3
- Perpetrator: Provisional IRA

The Provisional IRA carried out two separate attacks on 1 May 1988 against British military personnel in the Netherlands which resulted in the deaths of three RAF members and another three being injured. It was the worst attack suffered by the British security forces during The Troubles from 1969 to 1998 in mainland Europe.

== Background ==
1988 was one of the worst years of the Troubles conflict in terms of violence during the 1980s. It saw an increase in IRA activity, a new campaign of sectarian killings by loyalist paramilitaries, and a heavy response by the British Army to IRA attacks. On 6 March the SAS shot dead 3 IRA members in Gibraltar. On 16 March at the funerals of the IRA volunteers shot in Gibraltar, a loyalist UDA volunteer killed an IRA member, Kevin Brady, as well as 2 civilians and injured dozens of other people in a grenade and gun attack at Milltown cemetery in Belfast. At Brady's funeral, two plain clothed, off-duty, British Army corporals were cornered by an angry crowd who assumed they were under attack and the IRA killed both of them. In May, the UVF killed 3 Catholic civilians and injured 9 in a gun attack in a Belfast pub. On 15 June, 7 people were killed, first 6 British soldiers were killed in the Lisburn van bombing and then the IRA shot dead a UVF member.

On 7 July, an IRA member and 2 civilians were killed in a premature bomb explosion. Later that month on 23 July the IRA killed a family of three in a botched operation in Armagh. On 20 August the IRA killed 8 British soldiers and injured a further 28 in the Ballygawley bus bombing, this was the worst attack suffered by the British army since 1982. Ten days later on 30 August the SAS shot dead 3 more IRA Volunteers at Drumnakilly. One day later 3 civilians were killed when somebody triggered an IRA booby-trap bomb by mistake. Twenty-nine people were killed in the month of August alone. 104 people died in 1988 compared to 61 in 1986 and 57 in 1985. It was the worst year since 1982 when 110 people were killed.

=== Previous attacks in mainland Europe ===
The IRA and other Republican paramilitaries such as the Irish National Liberation Army (INLA) had been carrying out attacks against British military personnel and British diplomats on mainland Europe since the mid-1970s. Prominent attacks included:

- January 1973: A car bomb exploded in the Globe cinema carpark of JHQ Rheindahlen. The bomb was timed to go off when British military personnel were leaving the carpark. Nobody was hurt in the attack.
- 22 March 1979: Richard Sykes, then British Ambassador to the Netherlands, and his Dutch valet, Karel Straub, were killed in a gun attack in The Hague, Netherlands.
- 28 August 1979: Four British soldiers were wounded when the IRA detonated a bomb under a bandstand in Brussels, Belgium, as British Army musicians were preparing to perform.
- 16 February 1980: a British soldier was shot dead by the IRA outside his home, Bielefeld, West Germany.
- 24 November 1981: the left-wing Republican group INLA claimed responsibility for exploding a bomb outside the British Consulate in Hamburg, West Germany.
- 25 November 1981: the INLA claimed responsibility for exploding a bomb at a British Army base in Herford, West Germany; one British soldier was injured.
- 23 March 1987: 31 people were injured in a car bomb attack at Rheindahlen Military Complex, near Mönchengladbach in Germany.

== The attacks ==
The first attack of 1 May 1988 took place in the market of Roermond city, a popular social centre for British military personnel in the southeastern part of the Netherlands on the West German border. Two enlisted Royal Air Force members from the RAF Regiment based at RAF Wildenrath in Germany were sitting in a parked car near their base at around 01:00 am when IRA members fired shots from an automatic rifle into their car, killing one of the airmen (SAC Ian Shinner, 20) and badly injuring his companion. Police on the scene said that at least 23 bullets were fired into the vehicle.

Half an hour later in Nieuw-Bergen, about 30 miles north of Roermond, a booby-trap bomb that was placed under the car of four other RAF airmen exploded while they were parked outside a discotheque. The bombing killed two more RAF airmen (John Miller Reid and John Baxter) and injured two others. "The bodies were in such a condition that they could not immediately be identified", police spokesman Louis Steens told The Associated Press in Nieuw Bergen. The airmen were based at RAF Laarbruch, about 3 miles (5 km) away across the border in West Germany.

The IRA were able to identify the British military personnel due to the number plates on the cars. In both attacks, the cars being driven by the RAF members had British military licence plates.

The IRA issued a statement from Belfast in relation to the attacks saying: "We have a simple message for [Prime Minister Margaret] Thatcher. Disengage from Ireland and there will be peace. If not, there will be no haven for your military personnel and you will regularly be at airports awaiting your dead." Both the British and Irish governments condemned the attacks.

Many Irish Republicans saw the attacks as revenge for the killings of the three IRA volunteers in Gibraltar two months before (see Operation Flavius). In 1990, two Australian tourists were shot dead by the IRA in Roermond after being mistaken for British military personnel.

== See also ==
- 1987 Rheindahlen bombing (Germany)
- Operation Flavius (Gibraltar)
- Killings of Nick Spanos and Stephen Melrose (Netherlands)
- Osnabrück mortar attack (Germany)
