= Nieuw-Bergen =

Nieuw Bergen
- Town
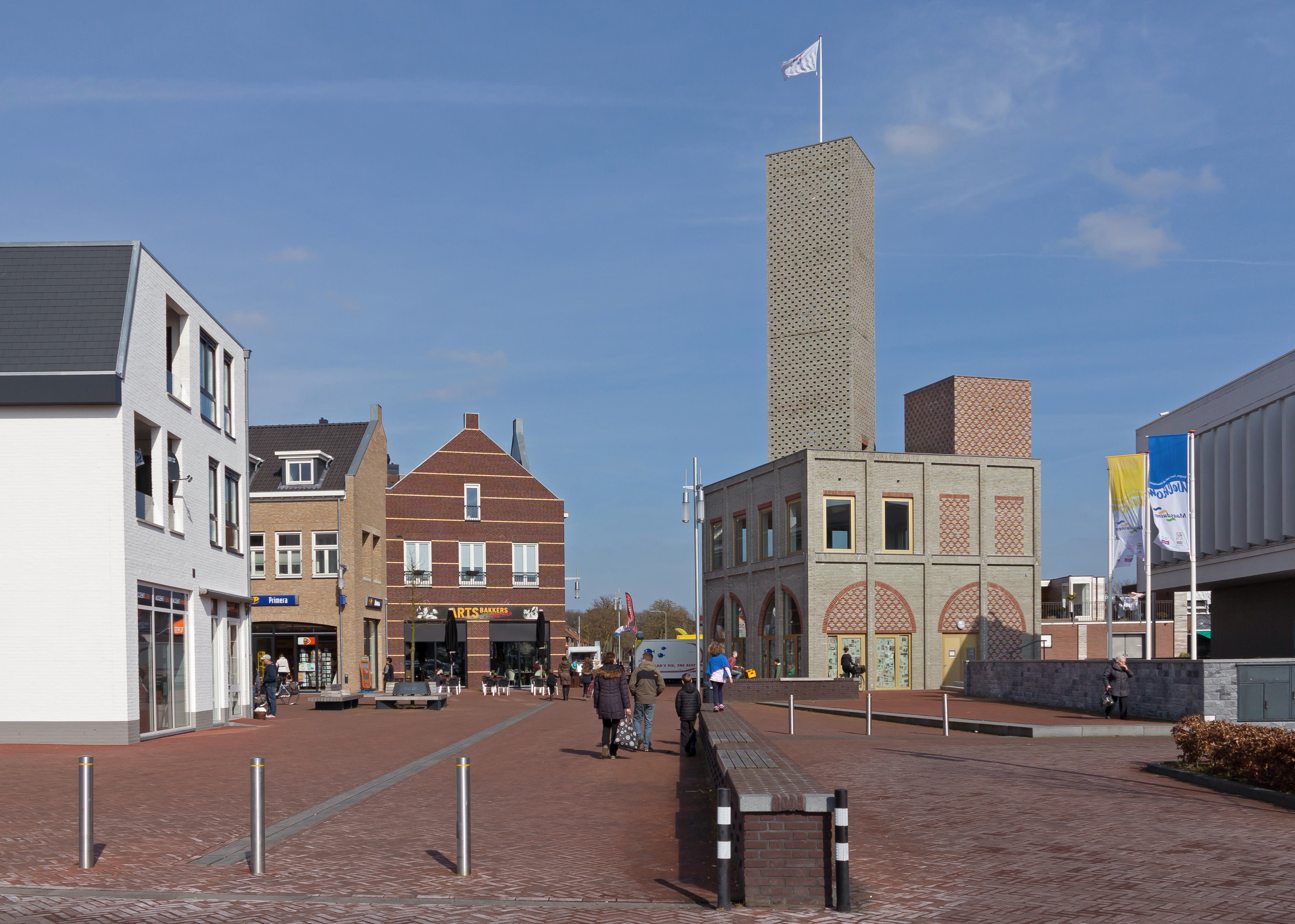
- Building at the square: het Raadhuisplein

- Location in the province of Limburg in the Netherlands Nieuw Bergen (Netherlands)
- Coordinates: 51°36′11″N 6°3′19″E
- Country: Netherlands
- Province: Limburg
- Municipality: Bergen, Limburg
- Established: 1963

Area
  - Total: 19.57 km^{2} (7.56 sq mi)
- Elevation: 14 m (46 ft)

Population (2021)
  - Total: 4,635
  - Density: 236.8/km^{2} (613.4/sq mi)
- Time zone: UTC+1 (CET)
  - Summer (DST): UTC+2 (CEST)
- Postal code: 5854
- Dialing code: 0485

Nieuw-Bergen (Dutch pronunciation: [ˌniu ˈbɛrɣə(n)]; Limburgish: Ni-j-Berge [ˌnɪj ˈbæʀ(ə)ɣə]) is a town in the Dutch province of Limburg. It is a part of the municipality of Bergen (L.) and lies about 28 km north of Venlo. Nieuw-Bergen was officially founded on 9 July 1963 as the new settlement.

After the destruction of Bergen in 1944–1945, a new settlement was built further to the east. Construction started in 1955. In 1969, the town hall of the municipality was built in Nieuw Bergen. In 1975, a church was built. In 2015, a shopping mall was built with apartments and a distinct 25 metres (82 ft) high tower to give the village a landmark.

In 1988, two British Royal Air Force off-duty soldiers were killed in the town by a bomb attached to their car by Irish Republican Army (IRA).

== Gallery ==
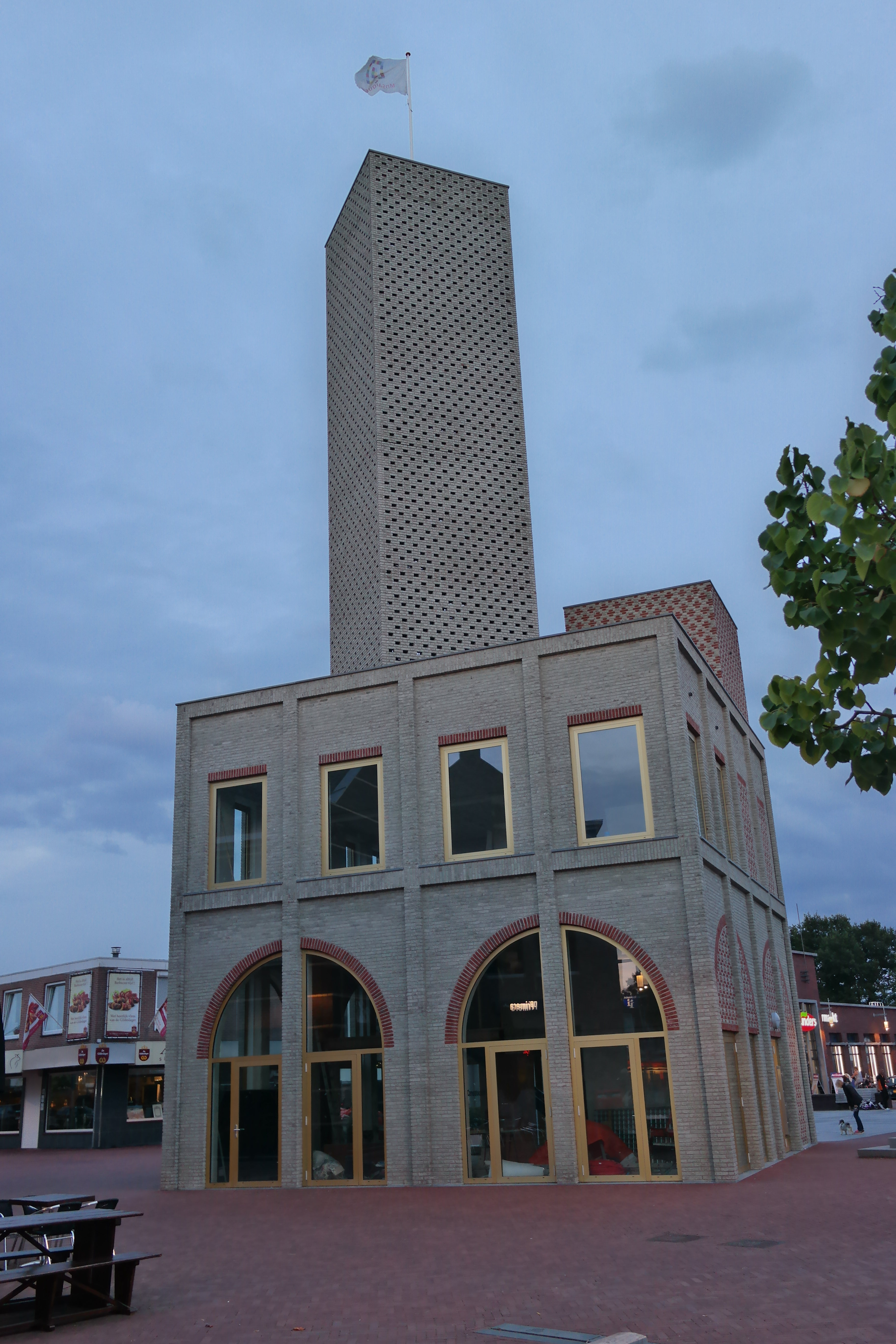
Town hall of Bergen

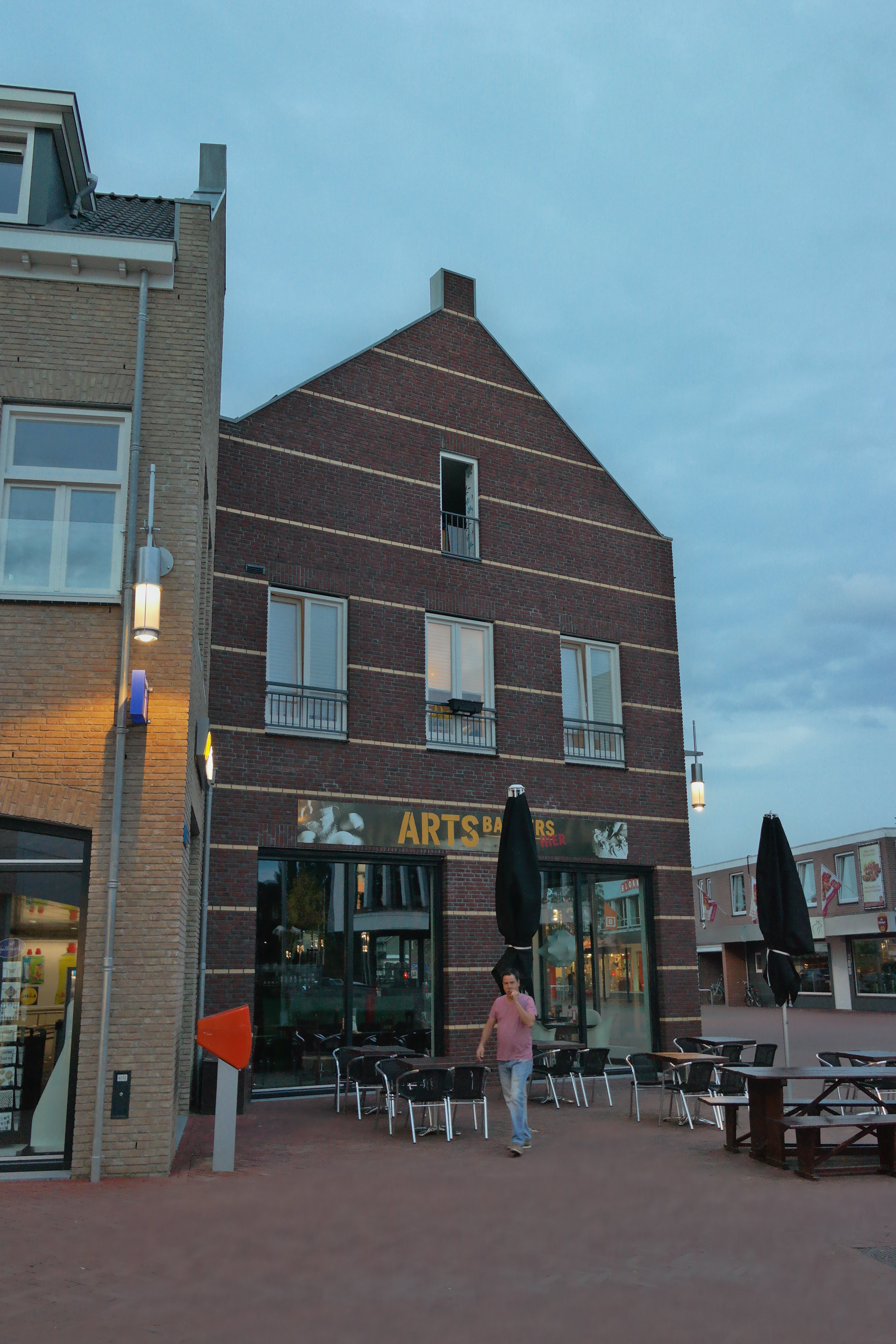
Cafeteria in Nieuw Bergen
