= Osnabrück mortar attack =

1996 IRA attack in Germany

- Part of the Troubles
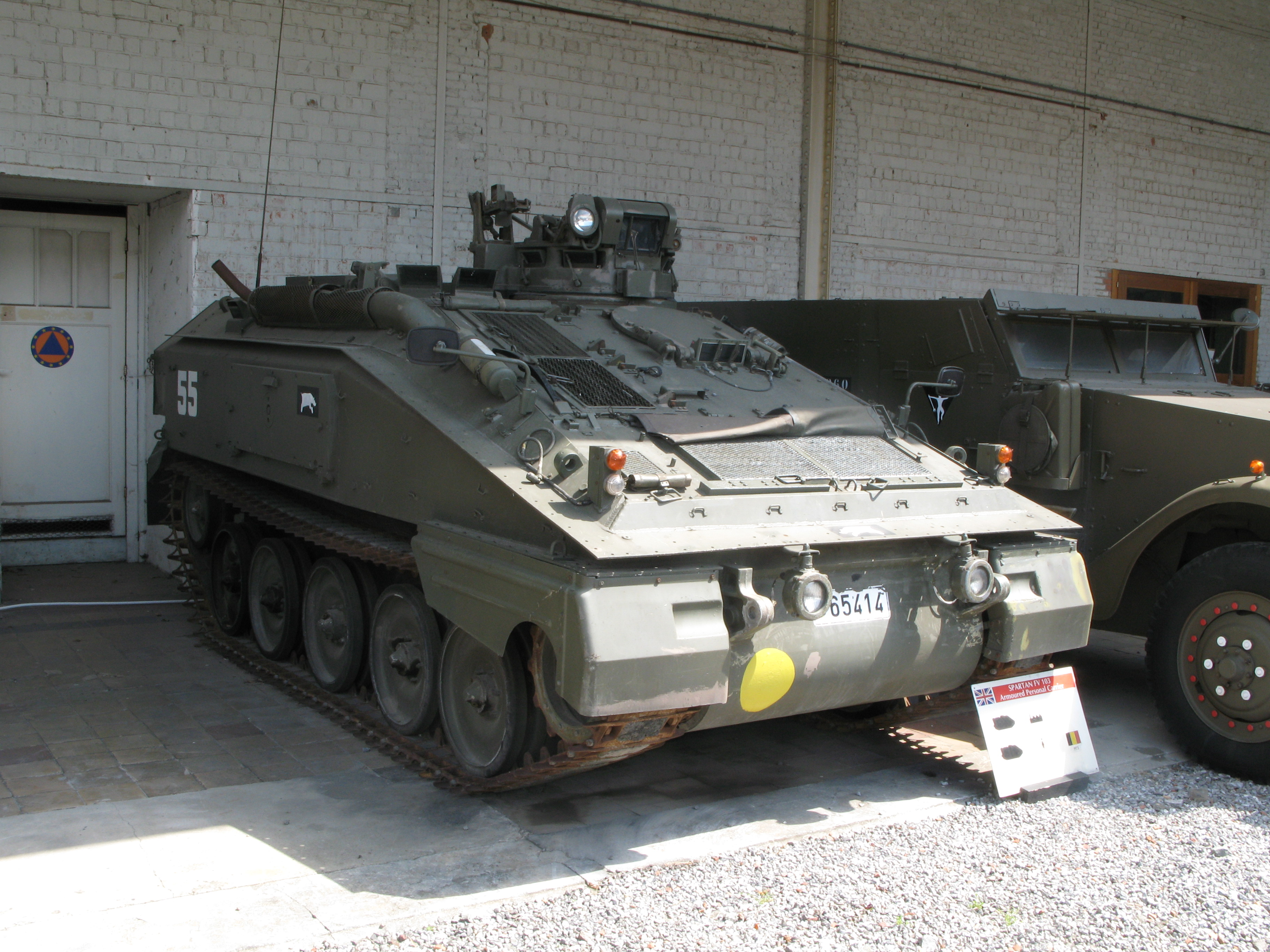
- A Spartan armoured carrier, a type of vehicle deployed at Osnabrück as part of the 4th Armoured Brigade

- Location: 52°18′1″N 7°58′59″E; Osnabrück, Germany
- Date: 28 June 1996; 18:50 (UTC+01:00)
- Target: British Army Quebec barracks
- Attack type: Mortar
- Deaths: 0
- Injuries: 0
- Perpetrator: Provisional IRA

The Osnabrück mortar attack was an improvised mortar attack carried out by a Provisional Irish Republican Army (IRA) unit based in mainland Europe on 28 June 1996 against the British Army's Quebec Barracks at Osnabrück Garrison near Osnabrück, Germany.

== Background ==
The main participants in the Troubles, in particular the British Government and the IRA, had accepted by the early 1990s that they could not resolve the conflict by force. The IRA believed that greater progress towards republican objectives might be achieved by negotiation. In this context, the IRA declared a "permanent cessation" of hostilities on 31 August 1994.

The IRA called off this ceasefire on 9 February 1996 because of the exclusion of Sinn Féin from the peace talks. They ended the truce by detonating a truck bomb at Canary Wharf in London, which caused serious damage to property and, despite advance warning from the IRA, the deaths of two civilians. In early June 1996, another truck bomb devastated Manchester city centre.

The Provisional IRA activities of 1996–1997 were used to gain leverage in negotiations with the British government during that period.

== The attack ==
The attack took place at 18:50, local time, when three Mark 15 mortar bombs were launched from an open Ford Transit van. The devices contained more than 180 lb (81.64 kg) of explosive in each projectile. The van had been modified by a former British Army engineer, Michael Dickson, who built the launch platform and aimed the tubes towards the barracks. The tubes were screwed to the floor of the van and masked with tarpaulins. Two of the bombs fell short of the perimeter fence and failed to explode, but the third went off 20 yards (18.3 mt) inside the base, leaving a crater near a petrol pump. No fire was ignited, but several buildings, cars and armoured vehicles were damaged by the blast. The destruction was described as 'substantial'. There were 150 soldiers inside the facilities at the time, but none were injured. An explosive charge was left in the vehicle with the intention of destroying forensic evidence, but the intact van's plates allowed it to be traced to Yorkshire.

The IRA unit was composed of five members, two of them women, who had rented a holiday home in northern Germany where they built the mortar launchers. Dickson later claimed at his trial that he had no experience in handling explosives during his career in the British Army's Royal Engineers. Dickson had served in several British bases in Germany, but never in Northern Ireland. Róisín McAliskey (daughter of republican activist Bernadette Devlin McAliskey) and Jimmy Corrie were also suspected of being members of the cell. The primary aim of the IRA with these events was reportedly to establish a permanent presence in mainland Europe.

== Aftermath ==
John Major, Prime Minister of the United Kingdom, said that the assault showed how the IRA and Sinn Féin were isolating themselves from the peace process. John Bruton, Taoiseach of Ireland, described the IRA strategy as "utterly pointless".

Whereas in 1994–95, the British Conservative Party government had refused to enter public talks with Sinn Féin until the IRA had given up its weapons, the Labour Party government in power by 1997 was prepared to include Sinn Féin in peace talks before IRA decommissioning. This precondition was officially dropped in June 1997.

Michael Dickson was arrested in December 2002 on an international arrest warrant relating to the 1996 mortar attack whilst he was driving a lorry-load of contraband cigarettes and tobacco at Ruzyne Airport in the Czech Republic. He was extradited to Germany and sentenced to six and a half years for attempted murder and setting off an explosion. He served his sentence in Celle maximum security prison in Germany, and was released after serving 27 months of his sentence. Róisin McAliskey battled successfully against the extradition warrant issued by Germany.

== See also ==
- 1985 Newry mortar attack
- 1994 British Army Lynx shootdown
- Barrack buster
- Chronology of Provisional Irish Republican Army actions (1990–1999)
- Downing Street mortar attack
- Timeline of the Troubles in Europe
