= Timeline of the Troubles =

Period of civil unrest in Northern Ireland (late 1960s–1998)

The Troubles were a period of conflict in Northern Ireland involving republican and loyalist paramilitaries, the British security forces and civilians. They are usually dated from the late 1960s to the Good Friday Agreement of 1998. However, sporadic violence has occurred since that time, with those involved often being referred to as dissident republicans and loyalists. The Troubles, sometimes known internationally as the Northern Ireland conflict, claimed roughly 3500 lives.

== Prior to 1960 ==
Since partition, the IRA had started a number of operations in Northern Ireland designed at bringing about their goal of a United Ireland. The intensity of this activity increased towards the end of 1941, where the IRA decided to step up its campaign of attacks in Northern Ireland. In response to this activity the Unionist authorities under John Miller Andrews introduced internment and using provisions of the Emergency Powers Act, instituted increasingly restrictive policies in Northern Ireland. This pattern of paramilitary violence, followed by increasingly restrictive measures on the behalf of the authorities came to define the run-up to the Troubles.

== 1960–1969 ==
Since 1964, civil rights activists had been protesting against the discrimination against Catholics and Irish nationalists by the Ulster Protestant and unionist government of Northern Ireland. The civil rights movement called for: 'one man, one vote'; the end to gerrymandered electoral boundaries; the end to discrimination in employment and in the allocation of public housing; repeal of the Special Powers Act; and the disbanding of the Ulster Special Constabulary.

=== 1966 ===
April	Loyalists led by Ian Paisley, a Protestant preacher, founded the Ulster Constitution Defence Committee (UCDC) to oppose the civil rights movement. It set up a paramilitary-style wing called the Ulster Protestant Volunteers (UPV).
21 May	A loyalist group calling itself the Ulster Volunteer Force (UVF) issued a statement declaring war on the Irish Republican Army (IRA). The group claimed to be composed of "heavily armed Protestants dedicated to this cause". At the time, the IRA was not engaged in armed action, and Irish nationalists were marking the 50th anniversary of the Easter Rising. Some unionists warned "that a revival of the IRA was imminent".
May–June	The UVF carried out three attacks on Catholics in Belfast. In the first, a Protestant civilian (Matilda Gould) died when UVF members tried to firebomb the Catholic-owned pub beside her house but accidentally struck her home. In the second, a Catholic civilian (John Patrick Scullion) was shot dead as he walked home. In the third, the UVF opened fire on three Catholic civilians as they left a pub, killing one, Peter Ward, and wounding the other two.

=== 1968 ===
20 June	Civil rights activists (including Stormont MP Austin Currie) protested against discrimination in the allocation of housing by illegally occupying a house in Caledon, County Tyrone. An unmarried Protestant woman (the secretary of a local Ulster Unionist Party (UUP) politician) had been given the house ahead of Catholic families with children. The protesters were forcibly removed by the Royal Ulster Constabulary (RUC).
24 August	Northern Ireland's first civil rights march was held. Many more marches would be held over the following year. Loyalists attacked some of the marches and organized counter-demonstrations to get the marches banned.
5 October	A Northern Ireland Civil Rights Association march was to take place in Derry. When the loyalist Apprentice Boys announced its intention to hold a march at the same place and time, the Government banned all marches taking place that day. When civil rights activists defied the ban, RUC officers surrounded the marchers and beat them indiscriminately and without provocation. Over 100 people were injured, including a number of MPs. This sparked two days of serious rioting in Derry between Republicans and the RUC.
8 October	About 2,000 students from Queen's University Belfast tried to march to Belfast City Hall in protest against police brutality on 5 October in Derry. The march was blocked by loyalists led by Ian Paisley. After the demonstration, a student civil rights group—People's Democracy—was formed.

== 1969–1970 ==
=== 1969 ===
4 January
A People's Democracy march between Belfast and Derry was repeatedly attacked by loyalists. At Burntollet it was ambushed by 200 loyalists and off-duty police (RUC) officers armed with iron bars, bricks and bottles. The marchers claimed that police did little to protect them. When the march arrived in Derry it was broken up by the RUC, which sparked serious rioting between Irish nationalists and the RUC. That night, RUC officers went on a rampage in the Bogside area of Derry; attacking Catholic homes, attacking and threatening residents, and hurling sectarian abuse. Residents then sealed off the Bogside with barricades to keep the police out, creating "Free Derry".
March–April
The loyalists intended to bring down the Ulster Unionist Party (UUP) Prime Minister of Northern Ireland, Terence O'Neill, who had promised some concessions to the civil rights movement. To this end, Members of the loyalist UVF and UPV bombed water and electricity installations in Northern Ireland, in deceitful false flag attacks, blaming them on the dormant IRA and on elements of the civil rights movement. There were six bombings and all were widely blamed on the IRA. As a response, British soldiers were sent to guard installations. Despite this, Loyalist-Unionist support for O'Neill continued to wane, and on 28 April he resigned as Prime Minister.
17 April
People's Democracy activist Bernadette Devlin was the youngest woman ever elected to Westminster, a record which stood until Mhairi Black's election in 2015.
19 April
During clashes with civil rights marchers in Derry, RUC officers entered the house of an uninvolved Catholic civilian, Samuel Devenny, and beat him, along with two of his daughters. One of the daughters was beaten unconscious as she lay recovering from surgery. Devenny suffered a heart attack and died on 17 July from his injuries.
13 July
During clashes with nationalists throwing stones at an Orange Hall in Dungiven, RUC officers beat Francis McCloskey, a Catholic civilian (aged 67). He died of his injuries the next day. Some consider this the first death of the Troubles.
5 August
The UVF planted their first bomb in the Republic of Ireland, damaging the RTÉ Television Centre in Dublin.
12–14 August
Battle of the Bogside – during an Apprentice Boys march, serious rioting erupted in Derry between Irish nationalists and the RUC. RUC officers, backed by loyalists, entered the nationalist Bogside in armoured cars and tried to suppress the riot by using CS gas, water cannon and eventually firearms. The almost continuous rioting lasted for two days.
14–17 August
Northern Ireland riots of August 1969 – in response to events in Derry, Irish nationalists held protests throughout Northern Ireland. Some of these became violent. In Belfast, loyalists responded by attacking nationalist districts. Rioting also erupted in Newry, Armagh, Crossmaglen, Dungannon, Coalisland and Dungiven. Six Catholics and two Protestants were shot dead and at least 133 were treated for gunshot wounds. Scores of houses and businesses were burnt out, most of them owned by Catholics. Thousands of families, mostly Catholics, were forced to flee their homes and refugee camps were set up in the Republic. This led to more people being displaced, with both Catholic & Protestant families leaving mixed estates & moving to estates that had either fellow Catholics or fellow Protestants in them making Belfast even more segregated between Catholic & Protestant. Protestants also moved from parts of Derry City, marking a similar divide in Derry as well as Belfast. This became the largest involuntary movement of a population in Europe since the end of the Second World War in 1945.

The British Army was deployed on the streets of Northern Ireland, which marked the beginning of Operation Banner.

11 October
Three people were shot dead during street violence in the loyalist Shankill area of Belfast. Two were Protestant civilians (George Dickie and Herbert Hawe) shot by the British Army and one was an RUC officer (Victor Arbuckle) shot by the UVF. Arbuckle was the first RUC officer to be killed in the Troubles. The loyalists "had taken to the streets in protest at the Hunt Report, which recommended the disbandment of the B Specials and disarming of the RUC".
October–December
The UVF detonated bombs in the Republic of Ireland. In Dublin it detonated a car bomb near the Garda Síochána central detective bureau. It also bombed a power station at Ballyshannon, a Wolfe Tone memorial in Bodenstown, and the O'Connell Monument in Dublin.
December
A split formed in the Irish Republican Army, creating what was to become the Official IRA and Provisional IRA.

== 1970–1979 ==
=== 1970 ===
31 March	Following an Orange Order march, intense riots erupted on the Springfield Road in Belfast. Violence lasted for three days, and the British Army used CS gas for the first time in large quantities. About 38 soldiers and dozens of civilians were injured.
3 April	Ian Freeland—the British Army's overall commander in Northern Ireland—announced that anyone throwing petrol bombs would be shot dead if they did not heed a warning from soldiers.
19 June	Edward Heath became Prime Minister of the United Kingdom after winning a majority in the general election.
27–28 June	Following the arrest of Bernadette Devlin, intense riots erupted in parts of Derry and Belfast. Further violence erupted in Belfast following Orange marches past Catholic neighbourhoods. This led to gun battles between republicans and loyalists. Seven people were killed.
3–5 July	Falls Curfew – a British Army raid in the Falls district of Belfast developed into a riot between soldiers and residents and then gun battles between soldiers and the 'Official' IRA. The British Army sealed off the area, imposed a 36-hour curfew and raided hundreds of homes under the cover of CS gas. Three Catholic civilians (Charles O'Neill, William Burns and Patrick Elliman) as well as a British journalist of Polish descent, Zbigniew Uglik, were killed by the British Army, sixty others were injured, and 300 were arrested. Fifteen soldiers were shot by the OIRA. After the change of UK Government from Labour to Conservative UK in June 1970 the UK's policy changed & became more open to the local Unionist government's influence. At this time UK Home Secretary Reginald Maudling declared in the House of Commons "We are now at war with the IRA". Maudling's statement also offered the opportunity to British Army CO of Belfast Frank Kitson to put his policies, including the use of Counter Gangs into play. Kitson had previously used these quasi-legal tactics with some success in Middle East and Africa
2 August	Rubber bullets were used for the first time.
August	The constitutional nationalist Social Democratic and Labour Party (SDLP) was formed.

=== 1971 ===
3–6 February	Under pressure from the unionist government of Northern Ireland, the British Army began a series of raids in nationalist areas of Belfast, sparking three days of violence. On 6 February, British soldiers shot dead Catholic civilian Bernard Watt in Ardoyne and IRA member James Saunders in Oldpark, claiming both were armed. Shortly after, the IRA shot dead British soldier Robert Curtis during rioting in New Lodge. He was the first on-duty British soldier killed in the Troubles. The next day, James Chichester-Clark, Prime Minister of Northern Ireland, declared that "Northern Ireland is at war with the Irish Republican Army Provisionals".
9 February	Five civilians, George Beck (aged 43), John Eakins (aged 52), Harry Edgar (aged 26), David Henson (aged 24), and William Thomas (aged 35) were killed by an IRA landmine as their vehicle passed, Brougher Mountain, near Trillick, County Tyrone. A British Army mobile patrol was reportedly the intended target. The five were on their way to inspect a transmitter: two of the dead men were BBC engineers, the other three were construction workers.
9 March	Three off-duty Scottish soldiers (John McCaig, Joseph McCaig and Dougald McCaughey) were shot dead by the IRA after being lured from a pub in Belfast. Two days later, 4,000 loyalist shipyard workers took to the streets to demand the mass internment of Irish republicans.
23 March	Brian Faulkner became the Prime Minister of Northern Ireland.
25 May	The IRA threw a time bomb into Springfield Road British Army/RUC base in Belfast, killing British Army Sergeant Michael Willetts and wounding seven RUC officers, two British soldiers and eighteen civilians.
8 July	During street disturbances, British soldiers shot dead two Catholic civilians (Desmond Beattie and Seamus Cusack) in Free Derry. As a result, riots erupted in the city and the SDLP withdrew from Stormont in protest.
August	Operation Demetrius: internment was introduced. Armed soldiers launched dawn raids throughout Northern Ireland, arresting 342 people suspected of being involved with the IRA. Most of those arrested were Catholics who had no links with republican paramilitaries, and many reported that they and their families were beaten and threatened by soldiers. This sparked four days of violence in which 20 civilians, two IRA members (Patrick McAdorey and Seamus Simpson) and two British soldiers were killed. Fourteen of the civilians, including a Catholic priest, Father Hugh Mullan, were killed by British soldiers; 11 of them in the Ballymurphy massacre. Winston Donnell (22) became the first Ulster Defence Regiment (UDR) soldier to die in 'the Troubles' when he was shot by the IRA near Clady, County Tyrone. An estimated 7,000 people, mostly Catholics, were forced to flee their homes. The introduction of internment caused a major, long-term increase in violence.
September	Loyalists formed the Ulster Defence Association (UDA). The group would quickly become the largest loyalist group in Northern Ireland.
2 November	Red Lion Pub bombing – the Provisional IRA exploded a bomb inside a pub on the Shankill Road, Belfast. The blast killed three Protestant civilians and around 30 other people were injured, some seriously. There was also a bombing in drapery shop at the same time right beside the pub which injured several more people.
4 December	McGurk's Bar bombing – the UVF exploded a bomb at a Catholic-owned pub in Belfast, killing fifteen Catholic civilians (including two children) and wounding seventeen others. This was the highest death toll from a single incident in Belfast during the Troubles.
11 December	Balmoral Showroom bombing – a bomb exploded outside a furniture showroom on the mainly-Protestant and loyalist Shankill Road, Belfast. Four civilians, two adults (Hugh Bruce, a Protestant, and Harold King, a Catholic), and two babies, Tracey Munn (2 years old) and Colin Nichol (17 months old) were killed. The babies both died instantly when part of the wall crashed down upon the pram they were sharing. The adult employees were killed and nineteen people were wounded. The IRA was blamed.

=== January–June ===
30 January
Bloody Sunday – 26 unarmed civilians were shot (of whom 13 were killed and one fatally wounded) by the British Army during a massive anti-internment demonstration in Derry. One of the dead, Gerard Donaghy, was a member of Fianna Éireann and reportedly had nail bombs on his person. After a lengthy examination of the evidence in the Inquiry's Report, Lord Saville concluded that "in our view Gerald Donaghey (sic) was probably in possession of the nail bombs when he was shot", but noted "... for reasons given elsewhere in this report ... Donaghey (sic) was not shot because of his possession of nail bombs".

This was the highest death toll from a single shooting incident during the Troubles.

2 February
Funerals of eleven of those killed on Bloody Sunday. Prayer services held across Ireland. In Dublin, over 30,000 marched to the British Embassy, carrying thirteen replica coffins and black flags. They attacked the Embassy with stones and bottles, then petrol bombs. The building was eventually burnt to the ground.
22 February
Aldershot bombing – seven people were killed by an Official IRA car bomb at Aldershot Barracks in England. It was thought to be in retaliation for Bloody Sunday. Six of those killed were ancillary workers (five female and one male), and the seventh was a Roman Catholic British Army chaplain (Father Gerry Weston, aka Captain Gerard Weston, MBE), who had recently returned from service in Northern Ireland. The six others were Thelma Bosley, Margaret Grant, John Haslar, Joan Lunn, Jill Mansfield, and Cherie Munton.
4 March
Abercorn Restaurant bombing – a bomb exploded in a crowded restaurant in Belfast, killing two Catholic civilians (Anne Owens and Janet Bereen) and wounding 130. Many were badly maimed. The IRA was blamed.
20 March
1972 Donegall Street bombing – the PIRA detonated its first car bomb, on Donegall Street in Belfast. Allegedly due to inadequate warnings, four civilians (Sydney Bell, Ernest Dougan, James Macklin, and Henry Miller), two RUC officers (Ernest McAllister and Bernard O'Neill) and a UDR soldier (Samuel Trainor) were killed while 148 people were wounded.
30 March
Northern Ireland's Government and Parliament were dissolved by the British Government. Direct rule from Westminster was introduced.
14 April
The PIRA exploded 24 bombs in towns and cities across Northern Ireland. There were 14 shootouts between the PIRA and security forces.
22 April
An 11-year-old boy (Francis Rowntree) was killed by a rubber bullet fired by the British Army in Belfast. He was the first person to die from a rubber bullet impact.
13–14 May
Battle at Springmartin – following a loyalist car bombing of a Catholic-owned pub in the Ballymurphy area of Belfast, clashes erupted between the PIRA, UVF and British Army. Seven people were killed: five civilians (four Catholics, one Protestant), a British soldier, and a member of the Fianna Éireann (PIRA youth wing).
28 May
Four PIRA volunteers and four civilians were killed when a bomb they were preparing exploded prematurely at a house on Anderson Street, Belfast.
29 May
The Official IRA announced a ceasefire. This marked the end of the Official IRA's military campaign.

=== July–December ===
9 July	Springhill Massacre – British snipers shot dead five Catholics (2 were youth members of republican paramilitary organizations, 3 were civilians, including a Roman Catholic priest, shot dead while trying to render aid to one of the injured, and a 13-year-old girl) and wounded two others in the Springhill section of Belfast. All of the victims were unarmed.
13 July	There was a series of gun-battles and shootings across Belfast. The PIRA shot dead three British Army soldiers (David Meeke, Kenneth Mogg, and Martin Rooney), and the British Army shot dead two civilians (Thomas Burns and Terence Toolan) and a PIRA volunteer (James Reid).
14 July	There was a series of gun-battles and shootings across Belfast. The PIRA shot dead three British Army soldiers (Peter Heppenstall, John Williams and Robert Williams-Wynn). The British Army shot dead a PIRA volunteer (Louis Scullion) and an OIRA volunteer (Edward Brady), while a Protestant civilian (Jane McIntyre) was shot dead in crossfire.
18 July	Killing of Thomas Mills – Thomas Mills was a factory night watchman who was killed while crossing a road by a soldier of the King's Regiment. At the time, the British Army claimed Mills was killed by the IRA. In 2019, the Historical Enquiries Team disclosed that Mills was not killed by the IRA, but by the British Army.
21 July	Bloody Friday – within the space of 75 minutes, the PIRA exploded twenty-two bombs in Belfast, killing nine people: six civilians (William Crothers, Jackie Gibson, Thomas Killops, Brigid Murray, Margaret O'Hare and Stephen Parker), two British Army soldiers (Stephen Cooper and Philip Price) and one UDA volunteer (William Irvine) were killed, while 130 were injured.
31 July	Operation Motorman – the British Army used 12,000 soldiers supported by tanks and bulldozers to re-take the "no-go areas" controlled by the PIRA.
31 July	Claudy bombing – nine civilians (five Catholics and four Protestants) were killed when three car bombs exploded in Claudy, County Londonderry. No group has since claimed responsibility but the late Father James Chesney, a local Catholic priest, who was the IRA's quartermaster and Director of Operations of the South Derry Brigade, was later implicated.
22 August	Newry customs bombing – three IRA members walked into a customs office Newry with a bomb. It exploded prematurely, killing all of them, two lorry drivers and four customs staff.
30 September	Murder of Eileen Doherty – Two UVF members Bobby Rodgers and a unidentified man hijacked a taxi driven by John Sherry, 19-year-old passenger Eileen Doherty who was Catholic was mortally wounded by a shot to the head. She would succumb to her wounds the next day.
23 October	Pitchfork murders – two unarmed Catholic civilians Michael Naan and Andrew Joseph Murray are stabbed 13 and 17 times respectively by Sgt. Stanley Hathaway and Cpl. John Byrne of the Argyll and Sutherland Highlanders.
20 Dec	Five civilians, four Catholics (Bernard Kelly, Charles McCafferty, Francis McCarron, and Michael McGinley) and one Protestant (Charles Moore), were killed in gun attack on the Top of the Hill Bar, Strabane Old Road, Waterside, Derry. It is believed the UDA was responsible.

=== 1973 ===
4 February	British Army snipers shot dead a PIRA volunteer and three civilians at the junction of Edlingham Street and New Lodge Road, Belfast.
7 February	The United Loyalist Council held a one-day strike to "re-establish some sort of Protestant or loyalist control over the affairs of the province". Loyalist paramilitaries forcibly tried to stop many people going to work and to close any businesses that had opened. There were eight bombings and thirty-five arsons. Three loyalist paramilitaries and one civilian were killed.
8 March	1973 Old Bailey Bombing – The PIRA undertook its first operation in England, when it planted four car bombs in London. Ten members of the PIRA team, including Gerry Kelly, Dolours Price and Marian Price, were arrested at Heathrow Airport while trying to leave the country.
17 May	Five British Army soldiers (Barry Cox, Frederick Drake, Arthur Place, Derek Reed, and Sheridan Young) were killed by a PIRA booby-trap bomb outside Knock-na-Moe Castle Hotel, Omagh, County Tyrone.
12 June	1973 Coleraine bombings – six Protestant pensioners (Dinah Campbell, Francis Campbell, Elizabeth Craigmile, Nan Davis, Elizabeth Palmer and Robert Scott) were killed and 33 other people wounded by a PIRA car bomb on Railway Road, Coleraine, County Londonderry. The warning given before the explosion had been inadequate.
28 June	Elections for the Northern Ireland Assembly take place.
31 October	Mountjoy Prison escape – three PIRA volunteers escaped from Mountjoy Prison in Dublin using a hijacked helicopter.
December	The Sunningdale Agreement was signed.

=== 1974 ===
4 February	M62 coach bombing – eight British Army soldiers and three civilians (the wife and two children of one of the soldiers who was killed) are killed when a PIRA bomb exploded on a bus as it was travelling along the M62 motorway in West Yorkshire, England.
4 March	Harold Wilson defeats Edward Heath in the general election to become British Prime Minister, it is his second time in office, the first being from 1964 to 1970.
20 April	The Troubles claimed its 1000th victim, James Murphy, a petrol station owner in County Fermanagh.
2 May	Rose & Crown Bar bombing – Six Catholic civilians (Francis Brennan, James Doherty, Thomas Ferguson, John Gallagher, William Kelly and Thomas Morrissey) were killed and eighteen wounded when the UVF exploded a bomb at Rose & Crown Bar on Ormeau Road, Belfast.
15 May	Beginning of the Ulster Workers' Council strike.
17 May	Dublin and Monaghan bombings – the UVF exploded four bombs (three in Dublin, one in Monaghan) in the Republic of Ireland. They killed thirty-three civilians and wounded a further 300. This was the highest number of casualties in a single incident during "The Troubles". It has been alleged that members of the British security forces were involved. The UVF did not claim responsibility until 15 July 1993.
28 May	The Northern Ireland Executive collapsed. As a result, direct rule was re-introduced.
15 June	Killing of John Pat Cunningham – Life Guards regiment soldier Dennis Hutchings fatally shot a unarmed mentally disabled man John Pat Cunningham three times in the back as he attempted to flee in a field. In 2017 Hutchings was brought to court for the killing however he died in 2021 during his trial.
17 June	The Provisional IRA bombed the Houses of Parliament in London, injuring 11 people and causing extensive damage.
7 August	A member of the British Army First Battalion, Royal Regiment of Wales fatally shot a 22 year old unarmed man in the back on his farm near Pomeroy, County Tyrone. No one was charged in the killing of Patrick McElhone but on 21 January 2021 a judge ruled that the killing was "unjustified". Judge Siobhan Keegan stated that McElhone was an "innocent man shot in cold blood without warning when he was no threat to anyone."
5 October	Guildford pub bombings – four British soldiers (William Forsyth, Ann Hamilton, John Hunter and Caroline Slater) and one civilian (Paul Craig) were killed by PIRA bombs at two pubs in Guildford, England.
7 November	1974 Woolwich bombing – two people (a British soldier and a civilian) were killed and 28 injured when the IRA threw a 6 lb gelignite bomb with the addition of shrapnel through the window of the Kings Arms pub in Woolwich, England.
21 November	Birmingham pub bombings – twenty-one civilians were killed when bombs exploded at two pubs in Birmingham, England. This was the deadliest attack in England during the Troubles. The "Birmingham Six" would be tried for this and convicted. Many years later, after new evidence of police fabrication and suppression of evidence, their convictions would be quashed and they would be released.
10 December	The Irish National Liberation Army (INLA) and its political wing the Irish Republican Socialist Party (IRSP) was founded at the Spa Hotel in the village of Lucan near Dublin.
22 December	The PIRA announced a Christmas ceasefire. Before the ceasefire, they carried out a bomb attack on the home of former Prime Minister Edward Heath. Heath was not in the building at the time and no one was injured.

=== 1975 ===
10 February	The PIRA agreed to a truce and ceasefire with the British government and the Northern Ireland Office. Seven "incident centres" were established in nationalist areas to monitor the ceasefire and the response of the security forces.
20 February	A feud began between the Official IRA (OIRA) and the Irish National Liberation Army (INLA). The two groups assassinated a number of each other's volunteers until the feud ended in June 1975.
March	A feud began between the Ulster Volunteer Force (UVF) and Ulster Defence Association (UDA), resulting in a number of assassinations.
13 March	A unit from the UVF's Belfast Brigade attempted to bomb the Catholic owned Peter Conway's bar on the Shore Road in Greencastle, Belfast. The bomb exploded prematurely, killing a Catholic civilian woman and one of the UVF bombers.
6 April	Daniel Loughran (18), then a member of the People's Liberation Army (PLA), which later became the Irish National Liberation Army (INLA), was shot dead at Divis Flats, Belfast, by members of the Official Irish Republican Army (OIRA) in the continuing feud between the OIRA and the INLA.
12 April	Five Catholic civilians (Marie Bennett, Elizabeth Carson, Mary McAleavey, Agnes McAnoy, and Arthur Penn) were killed in a UVF gun and grenade attack on the Strand Bar, Anderson Street, Short Strand, Belfast. Another Catholic civilian (Michael Mulligan) died of his injuries on 20 April 1975. Elizabeth Carson's husband, Willy, lost an arm in the attack.
12 April	Paul Crawford (25), then a member of the Official Irish Republican Army (OIRA), was shot dead on the Falls Road, Belfast. This killing was another in the feud between the OIRA and the Irish National Liberation Army (INLA).
22 June	The UVF tried to derail a train by planting a bomb on the railway line near Straffan, County Kildare, Republic of Ireland. A civilian, Christopher Phelan, tried to stop the UVF members, and was stabbed-to-death. His actions, however, reportedly delayed the explosion long enough to allow the train to pass safely.
17 July	Four British soldiers (Calvert Brown, Edward Garside, Robert McCarter, and Peter Willis) were killed by a PIRA remote-controlled bomb near Forkill, County Armagh. The attack was the first major breach of the February truce.
31 July	Miami Showband massacre – UVF members (some of whom were also UDR soldiers) shot dead three musicians (Tony Geraghty and Fran O'Toole, both from the Republic of Ireland, and Brian McCoy, a Northern Irish Protestant), members of the Irish showband called "Miami Showband", at Buskhill, County Down. The gunmen staged a bogus military checkpoint, stopped the showband's minibus and ordered the musicians out. Two UDR soldiers (Harris Boyle and Wesley Somerville) hid a time bomb in the bus, but it exploded prematurely and they were killed. The other gunmen then opened fire on the musicians and fled. Three UDR soldiers were later convicted for their part in the attack.
13 August	Bayardo Bar attack – PIRA volunteers carried out a gun and bomb attack on the Bayardo Bar, a pub in Belfast frequented by UVF commanders. Four Protestant civilians (Linda Boyle, William Gracey, Samuel Gunning, and Joanne McDowell), and one UVF member (Hugh Harris) were killed.
27 August	Caterham Arms pub bombing – The Provisional IRA exploded a bomb in a Caterham pub injuring 33 people (10 soldiers & 23 civilians). This marked the end of their ceasefire in England.
1 September	Five Protestant civilians (William Herron, John Johnston, Nevin McConnell, James McKee, and Ronald McKee) were killed and seven were wounded in a gun attack on Tullyvallen Orange Hall near Newtownhamilton, County Armagh. One of the Orangemen was an off-duty RUC officer, who returned fire. The attack was claimed by the South Armagh Republican Action Force (SARAF), which claimed it was retaliation for "the assassinations of fellow Catholics in Belfast".
5 September	London Hilton bombing – The Provisional IRA exploded a bomb in the lobby of the Hilton hotel in London killing two people and injuring 63
2 October	The UVF killed seven civilians in a series of attacks across Northern Ireland. Six were Catholics (Frances Donnelly, Gerard Grogan, Marie McGrattan, Thomas Murphy, Thomas Osbourne, and John Stewart) and one was a Protestant (Irene Nicholson). Four UVF members (Mark Dodds, Geoffrey Freeman, Aubrey Reid, David Swanson) were killed when the bomb they were transporting prematurely exploded as they drove along the Farrenlester road in Coleraine, County Londonderry.
9 October	Green Park Tube Station Bombing – One person was killed and 20 injured when the IRA exploded a bomb in Green Park, near Piccadilly, London
30 October	The IRA's Balcombe Street unit bombed an Italian restaurant in London's West End. 18 people were injured in the blast. This was the first in a string of restaurant bombings by the IRA unit.
12 November	Scott's Oyster Bar bombing – One person was killed and 15 injured when the IRA threw a bomb through a restaurant in London's West End.
18 November	Walton's Restaurant bombing – Two civilians were killed and 23 civilians injured when the Provisional IRA threw a bomb without warning into a restaurant in Walton Street, Chelsea, London. The IRA unit who carried out this attack was also responsible for the Caterham, Hilton Hotel, Green Park and Scott's Oyster bombings in recent weeks. See: Provisional IRA's Balcombe Street Gang
22 November	Drummuckavall Ambush – three British Army soldiers (James Duncan, Peter McDonald and Michael Sampson) were killed and one soldier was wounded when the PIRA attacked a watchtower in Drummuckavall, Crossmaglen, South Armagh.
25 November	A loyalist gang nicknamed the "Shankill Butchers" undertook its first "cut-throat killing" (that of Francis Crossin). The gang was named for its late-night kidnapping, torture and murder (by throat slashing) of random Catholic civilians in Belfast.
29 November	Dublin Airport bombing. A bomb exploded in the arrivals terminal of Dublin Airport, killing one person and injuring nine others. The UDA claim responsibility.
5 December	End of internment.
6 December	Balcombe Street Siege – for six days, four PIRA volunteers held two hostages at an apartment in London.
19 December	The Red Hand Commandos exploded a no-warning car bomb in Dundalk, killing two civilians (Jack Rooney and Hugh Watters) and wounding twenty. Shortly after, the same group launched a gun and bomb attack across the border in Silverbridge. Two local Catholic civilians and brothers (Michael and Patrick Donnelly) and an English civilian (Trevor Brecknell), married to a local woman, were killed in that attack, while six others were wounded. The attacks have been linked to the "Glenanne gang".
31 December	Central Bar bombing – INLA Volunteers using the covername "Armagh People's Republican Army" killed three people in a bomb attack on a pub in Gilford, County Armagh.

=== 1976 ===
4–5 January
Reavey and O'Dowd killings – the UVF shot dead six Catholic civilians from two families (one group was a trio of brothers; the other was an uncle and two nephews) in co-ordinated attacks in County Armagh. An officer in the RUC Special Patrol Group took part in the killings, which have been linked to the "Glenanne gang".

Kingsmill massacre – in retaliation for Reavey and O'Dowd killings, the South Armagh Republican Action Force shot eleven Protestant men after stopping their minibus at Kingsmill, County Armagh. Ten died; one survived despite being shot 18 times.

23 January
The PIRA truce of February 1975 was officially brought to an end.
March
End of Special Category Status for prisoners convicted of terrorist crimes.
16 March
Harold Wilson announced his resignation as British Prime Minister, taking effect on 5 April 1976.
17 March
Four Catholic civilians, including two children (Patrick Barnard, Joseph Kelly, James McCaughey, and Andrew Small) were killed and twelve wounded when the UVF exploded a car bomb at Hillcrest Bar, Dungannon. The attack has been linked to the "Glenanne gang".
27 March
The IRA detonated a bomb at London's Olympia Hall which injured 85 people. One woman later dies of her injuries. See: 1976 Olympia bombing
5 April
James Callaghan was elected leader of the Labour Party and succeeded Harold Wilson as Prime Minister of the United Kingdom.
15 May
The UVF launched gun and bomb attacks on two pubs in Charlemont, County Armagh, killing four Catholic civilians (Felix Clancy, Robert McCullough, Frederick McLoughlin, and Sean O'Hagan). A British Army UDR soldier was later convicted for taking part in the attacks.
The PIRA killed three RUC officers in County Fermanagh and one RUC officer in County Down.
5 June
Nine civilians were killed during separate attacks in and around Belfast. After a suspected republican bombing killed two Protestant civilians (Robert Groves and Edward McMurray) in a pub, the UVF killed three Catholic civilians and two Protestant civilians, all males (Samuel Corr, James Coyle, Edward Farrell, John Martin, and Daniel McNeil) in a gun and bomb attack at the Chlorane Bar. In a separate bomb attack on the International Bar, Portaferry, County Down, the UVF killed a Catholic civilian. The UDA/UFF also assassinated a member of Sinn Féin, Colm Mulgrew.
25 June
Ruby Kidd (28), Francis Walker (17) and Joseph McBride (56), all Protestant civilians, were shot dead during a Republican Action Force gun attack on The Store Bar, Lyle Hill Road, Templepatrick.
21 July
Ramble Inn attack – the UVF killed six civilians (five Protestants, one Catholic) in a gun attack at a pub near Antrim. The pub was targeted because it was owned by Catholics. The victims were Frank Scott, Ernest Moore, James McCallion, Joseph Ellis, James Francey (all Protestants) and Oliver Woulahan, a Catholic.
21 July
Christopher Ewart Biggs (the British Ambassador to Ireland) and his secretary, Judith Cook, were assassinated by a bomb planted in Biggs' car in Dublin. Two others in the car were seriously injured.
30 July
Four Protestant civilians were shot dead at a pub off Milltown Road, Belfast. The attack was claimed by the Republican Action Force.
10 August
1976 Andersonstown incident – a PIRA volunteer, Danny Lennon was shot dead by the British Army as he drove along Finaghy Road North in Belfast. His car then went out of control and killed three children of the Maguire family. This incident sparked a series of "peace rallies" throughout the month. The group that organised the rallies became known as Peace People, and was led by Mairead Corrigan and Betty Williams. Their rallies were the first (since the conflict began) where large numbers of Protestants and Catholics joined forces to campaign for peace.
14 August
Killing of Majella O'Hare – a British soldier Pvt. Michael Williams fatally shot and killed 12-year-old Majella O'Hare as she walked to church in Whitecross. In 2011 then Secretary of Northern Ireland, Owen Patterson and then Defence Secretary, Liam Fox issued an apology for both the killing of O'Hare and for the acquittal of Williams.
September
Blanket protests began in the Maze prison, in protest at the end of special category status. The term 'blanket protest' comes from the protesters' refusal to wear prison uniforms, instead wrapping blankets around themselves.

=== 1977 ===
3 May	The United Unionist Action Council began a region-wide strike. The strike was organised to demand a tougher security response from the government and a return to 'majority-rule' government at Stormont.
15 May	British Army captain Robert Nairac was abducted by the IRA in South Armagh while in an undercover operation and killed in a field in the Ravensdale Woods in the north of County Louth, in the Republic.
27 July	Four people were shot dead and 18 were injured as part of the continuing feud between the Provisional Irish Republican Army and members of the Official Irish Republican Army.
10 October	Mairead Corrigan and Betty Williams received the Nobel Peace Prize.

=== 1978 ===
17 February	La Mon restaurant bombing – eleven civilians and an RUC officer were killed and thirty wounded by a PIRA incendiary bomb at the La Mon Restaurant near Belfast.
17 February	One of the highest ranking soldiers to be killed in action during the Troubles, Lieutenant Colonel Ian Corden-Lloyd, died when the Gazelle helicopter he was flying on was brought down with machine gun fire by members of PIRA's South Armagh Brigade.
17 June	The PIRA killed an RUC officer (Hugh McConnell) and kidnapped and murdered another (William Turbitt), near Crossmaglen, County Armagh. The following day, loyalist paramilitaries kidnapped a Catholic priest and vowed to hold him hostage until the RUC officer was freed. However, they released the priest shortly thereafter under pressure from the authorities and church leaders. In December 1978 the kidnappers were charged with the kidnapping and the murder of a Catholic shopkeeper, William Strathearn.
21 June	The British Army shot dead three PIRA volunteers (Denis Brown, William Mailey, and James Mulvenna) and a passing UVF member (William Hanna, in a case of mistaken identity) at a postal depot on Ballysillan Road, Belfast. It is claimed that the PIRA volunteers were about to launch a bomb attack.
21 September	The PIRA exploded bombs at the RAF airfield near Eglinton, County Londonderry. The terminal building, two aircraft hangars and four planes were destroyed.
14–19 November	The PIRA exploded over fifty bombs in towns across Northern Ireland, injuring thirty-seven people. Belfast, Derry, Armagh, Castlederg, Cookstown and Enniskillen were hardest hit.
30 November	The PIRA carried out bomb and fire-bomb attacks in 14 towns and villages across Northern Ireland. The PIRA issued a statement warning that it was preparing for a 'long war'.
21 December	Three British soldiers were shot dead in an IRA ambush on their foot patrol in Crossmaglen, County Armagh.

=== 1979 ===
20 February	Eleven loyalists known as the "Shankill Butchers" were sentenced to life in prison for nineteen murders. The gang was named for its late-night kidnapping, torture and murder (by throat slashing) of random Catholic civilians in Belfast.
22 March	The PIRA assassinated Richard Sykes, the British ambassador to the Netherlands, along with his valet, Karel Straub, in Den Haag. The group also exploded twenty-four bombs in various locations across Northern Ireland.
30 March	The INLA assassinated Airey Neave, Conservative MP and advisor to Margaret Thatcher. The INLA exploded a booby-trap bomb underneath his car as he left the House of Commons, London.
17 April	Four RUC officers were killed by a PIRA van bomb in Bessbrook, County Armagh. The bomb was estimated at 1000 lb, believed to be the largest PIRA bomb used up to that point.
4 May	Margaret Thatcher of the Conservative Party wins a landslide victory to become Prime Minister of the United Kingdom defeating the Labour Party who were in power for five years.
27 August	Warrenpoint ambush – eighteen British Army soldiers were killed when the PIRA exploded two roadside bombs as a British convoy passed Narrow Water Castle near Warrenpoint. There was a brief exchange of fire, and the British Army shot dead a civilian on the opposite side of the border with the Republic. This was the British Army's highest death toll from a single attack during the Troubles. On the same day, four people (including Lord Mountbatten, a cousin of the Queen) were killed by a PIRA bomb on board a boat near the coast of County Sligo.
September	During a visit to the Republic of Ireland, Pope John Paul II appealed for an end to the violence in Northern Ireland.
16 December	Four British Army soldiers (Allan Ayrton, William Beck, Simon Evans, and Keith Richards) were killed by a PIRA landmine near Dungannon, County Tyrone. Another British Army soldier (Peter Grundy) was killed by a PIRA landmine near Forkill, County Armagh, and an ex-UDR soldier (James Fowler) was shot dead in Omagh.

== 1980–1989 ==
=== 1980 ===
17 January	Three British Army (Ulster Defence Regiment) soldiers were killed by the PIRA in a land mine attack near Castlewellan, County Down, marking 2,000 deaths in the official death toll in Northern Ireland.
17 January	Dunmurry train explosion – a PIRA bomb prematurely detonated on a passenger train near Belfast, killing two civilians (Mark Cochrane and Max Olorunda) as well as one of the bombers (Kevin Delaney), and severely injuring five (including the other bomber, Patrick Flynn).
2 May	M60 gang - Four IRA men were cornered by a Special Air Service (SAS) eight-man unit in a house they had taken over at Antrim Road, Belfast. The SAS team was engaged from the upper part of the house with an M60 machine gun. Captain Herbert Westmacott was killed instantly, while the remaining soldiers returned fire and withdrew. The IRA unit surrendered to the authorities shortly after. One of the detainees was Angelo Fusco.
10 June	Eight PIRA prisoners escaped from Crumlin Road Gaol in Belfast. Using handguns that had been smuggled into the prison, they took prison officers hostage and shot their way out of the building.
October	Republican prisoners in the Maze began a hunger strike in protest against the end of special category status.
December	First Republican hunger strike called off.

=== 1981 ===
21 January	Sir Norman Stronge and his son James Stronge (both former UUP MPs) were assassinated by the IRA at their home Tynan Abbey, which was then burnt down.
1 March	Republican prisoners in the Maze began a second hunger strike.
9 April	Hunger striker Bobby Sands won a by-election to be elected as a Member of Parliament at Westminster. The law was later changed to prevent prisoners standing in elections.
5 May	After 66 days on hunger strike, Sands died in the Maze. Nine further hunger strikers died in the following 3 months.
19 May	Five British Army soldiers (Michael Bagshaw, Paul Bulman, Andrew Gavin, John King, and Grenville Winstone) were killed when their Saracen APC was ripped apart by a PIRA roadside bomb at Chancellor's Road, Altnaveigh, near Bessbrook, County Armagh.
17 July	Glasdrumman ambush – the PIRA attacked a British Army post in South Armagh, killing one soldier (Lance Corporal Gavin Dean) and injuring another (Rifleman John Moore).
1 September	Northern Ireland's first religiously integrated secondary school opened.
3 October	Republican hunger strike ended.
10 October	Chelsea Barracks bombing – The PIRA detonated a bomb outside the Chelsea barracks in London, killing two civilians and injuring 40 people.
14 November	The IRA killed Ulster Unionist Party MP Rev Robert Bradford, at Community Centre, Finaghy, Belfast, along with another man (Kenneth Campbell), who was the caretaker of the premises.

=== 1982 ===
25 March	Three British soldiers (Daniel Holland, Nicholas Malakos, and Anthony Rapley) were killed and five other people injured in an IRA gun attack on Crocus Street, off the Springfield Road in West Belfast.
20 April	The PIRA exploded bombs in Belfast, Derry, Armagh, Ballymena, Bessbrook and Magherafelt. Two civilians were killed and twelve were injured.
20 July	Hyde Park and Regent's Park bombings – eleven British soldiers and seven military horses died in PIRA bomb attacks during military ceremonies in Regent's Park and Hyde Park, London. Many spectators were badly injured.
16 September	1982 Divis Flats bombing – the INLA detonated a remote-control bomb hidden in a drainpipe as a British patrol passed Cullingtree Walk, Divis Flats, Belfast. A British soldier, Kevin Waller, and two Catholic children, Stephen Bennett and Kevin Valliday, were killed.
20 October	Elections to the new 78 seat Northern Ireland Assembly took place across Northern Ireland. The SDLP and Sinn Féin ran on abstentionist platforms. The emergence of Sinn Féin as a political force caused deep concern in British establishment circles.
27 October	Three RUC officers were killed in an PIRA land mine attack on their patrol car near Oxford Island, near Lurgan, County Armagh.
11 November	Three unarmed IRA members were shot dead by members of an undercover RUC unit. Three more unarmed Republican suspects were killed by the RUC in disputed circumstances before the year ended.
6 December	Droppin Well bombing – eleven British soldiers and six civilians were killed by an INLA time bomb at the Droppin' Well Bar in Ballykelly, County Londonderry.

=== 1983 ===
11 April	In the first 'supergrass' trial, fourteen UVF members were jailed for a total of two hundred years.
May	New Ireland Forum set up.
13 July	Four British Army soldiers (Ronald Alexander, Thomas Harron, John Roxborough, and Oswald Neely), all Protestant members of the 6th Battalion Ulster Defence Regiment, were killed when their vehicle struck a PIRA landmine near Ballygawley, County Tyrone.
5 August	In another 'supergrass' trial, twenty-two PIRA volunteers were jailed for a total of over four thousand years. Eighteen would later have their convictions quashed.
25 September	Maze Prison escape – thirty-eight republican prisoners staged an elaborate escape from the Maze Prison in County Antrim. One prison officer died of a heart attack, and twenty others were injured, including two shot with guns that had been smuggled into the prison. Half of the escapees were recaptured within two days. Others were later captured but some evaded capture in the Republic of Ireland or the United States.
20 November	Gunmen opened fire on a Protestant church service in Darkley, County Armagh, killing three churchmen and injuring several more. The attack was claimed by the "Catholic Reaction Force", however, one of the gunmen was a member of the INLA and INLA weapons were used.
17 December	Harrods bombing – a PIRA car bomb outside a department store in London killed six people, three civilians (Philip Geddes, Jasmine Cochrane-Patrick, and Kenneth Salvesen, a United States citizen), and three police officers, Sergeant Noel Lane, Constable Jane Arbuthnot and Inspector Stephen Dodd. Another policeman lost both legs and 90 people were injured. The PIRA's Army Council claimed it had not authorised the attack.

=== 1984 ===
21 February	Two PIRA volunteers (Henry Hogan and Declan Martin) and a British soldier (Paul Oram) were killed during a shootout in Dunloy, near Ballymoney, County Antrim.
18 May	Three British soldiers (Thomas Agar, Robert Huggins, and Peter Gallimore) were killed by a PIRA landmine in Enniskillen, County Fermanagh. Two RUC officers were killed by a PIRA landmine near Camlough, South Armagh on the same day.
12 August	Killing of Sean Downes – RUC constable mortally wounded 22-year-old ex-IRA youth member Sean Downes hitting him in the chest with a plastic bullet as he approached him with a stick during an anti-internment rally.
12 October	Brighton hotel bombing – the PIRA carried out a bomb attack on the Grand Hotel, Brighton, which was being used as a base for the Conservative Party Conference. Five people, including Sir Anthony Berry, a Member of Parliament, died in the bombing, and others were maimed or injured. Prime Minister Margaret Thatcher escaped harm.
December	Ian Thain became the first British soldier to be convicted of murdering a civilian during the Troubles. He was sentenced to life in prison for the killing of a Belfast man in 1983.
2 December	British soldier Alistair Slater and PIRA volunteers Antoine Mac Giolla Bhrighde and Kieran Fleming are killed in a SAS ambush.

=== 1985 ===
28 February	Newry mortar attack – a PIRA mortar attack on an RUC base in Newry killed nine officers and wounded thirty-seven. This was the RUC's highest death toll from a single attack during the Troubles.
20 May	Four RUC officers (David Baird, Tracy Doak, Stephen Rodgers, William Wilson) were killed on mobile patrol by a PIRA remote-controlled bomb near Killeen, County Armagh.
15 November	Margaret Thatcher and Garret FitzGerald signed the Anglo-Irish Agreement.
December	All fifteen Unionist MPs at Westminster resigned in protest against the Anglo-Irish agreement.
7 December	Attack on Ballygawley barracks – the PIRA launched an assault on the RUC barracks in Ballygawley, County Tyrone. Two RUC officers (Constable George Gilliland and Reserve Constable William Clements) were killed. The barracks was completely destroyed by the subsequent bomb explosion and three other RUC officers were injured.

=== 1986 ===
June	The Northern Ireland Assembly was officially dissolved.
August	The PIRA issued a warning that anyone working with the security forces in Northern Ireland would be considered "part of the war machine" and would be "treated as collaborators".
7 August	Clontibret invasion – Peter Robinson, then deputy leader of the DUP, marched with 500 Loyalists into the village of Clontibret, County Monaghan, in the Republic of Ireland and entered the Garda Síochána station in the village and physically assaulted two Garda officers.
2 November	During the Sinn Féin Ard Fheis (party conference) in Dublin, a majority of delegates voted to end the party's policy of abstentionism – refusing to take seats in Dáil Éireann (Irish parliament). This led to a split and Ruairí Ó Brádaigh, Dáithí Ó Conaill and approximately 100 people staged a walk-out. The two men would form a new party called Republican Sinn Féin.
10 November	Loyalists held a closed meeting at the Ulster Hall in Belfast. The main speakers at the meeting were Ian Paisley, Peter Robinson and Ivan Foster. During the meeting a new organisation, Ulster Resistance, was formed to "take direct action as and when required" to end the Anglo-Irish Agreement.
21 December	INLA member Thomas McCartan (31), was shot dead by the INLA splinter group the Irish People's Liberation Organisation (IPLO) in Andersonstown, Belfast. This was the first killing in an INLA / IPLO feud that was to last until 22 March 1987 and claim a dozen lives.

=== 1987 ===
8 May	Loughgall Ambush – eight PIRA volunteers and one civilian were killed by the Special Air Service (SAS) in Loughall, County Armagh. The eight-strong PIRA unit had just exploded a bomb, carried to the target in the bucket of an excavator, at the local RUC base. The IRA men were ambushed by the 24-strong SAS unit.
8 November	Remembrance Day bombing – eleven civilians and an RUC officer were killed and sixty-three others were wounded by a PIRA bomb during a Remembrance Day service in Enniskillen, County Fermanagh. One of those killed was Marie Wilson. In an emotional BBC interview, her father Gordon Wilson (who was injured in the attack) expressed forgiveness towards his daughter's killer, and asked Loyalists not to seek revenge. He became a leading peace campaigner and was later elected to the Irish Senate. He died in 1995.
22 December	UDA/UFF leader John McMichael was assassinated by the IRA.

=== 1988 ===
January	SDLP leader John Hume and Sinn Féin leader Gerry Adams held a meeting at Clonard Monastery in Belfast mediated by Father Alec Reid.
6 March	Operation Flavius – three PIRA volunteers (Daniel McCann, Seán Savage and Mairéad Farrell) were killed by the SAS in Gibraltar.
16 March	Milltown Cemetery attack – at the funeral of those killed in Gibraltar, Loyalist Michael Stone (using pistols and grenades) attacked the mourners, killing one PIRA volunteer (Caoimhín Mac Brádaigh, a.k.a. Kevin Brady), and two civilians (Thomas McErlean and John Murray). More than 60 others were wounded. Much of the attack was filmed by television news crews.
19 March	Corporals killings – at the funeral of Caoimhín Mac Brádaigh (aka Kevin Brady), who was killed in the Milltown Cemetery attack, two non-uniformed British Army corporals (David Howes and Derek Wood) were mistaken for loyalist gunmen and attacked by civilians after driving a car into the funeral procession. The two were later shot dead by the IRA.
1 May	Three British soldiers, all members of the Royal Air Force, were killed and four others were wounded when the PIRA launched separate attacks in the Netherlands.
15 May	Avenue Bar shooting A UVF unit walked into a Catholic-owned bar in Union Street, Belfast, killing three civilians and injuring six others.
15 June	1988 Lisburn van bombing – six off-duty British Army soldiers (Signalman Mark Clavey, Lance Corporal Derek Green, Lance Corporal Graham Lambie, Corporal Ian Metcalf, Corporal William Patterson, and Sergeant Michael Winkler) were killed by a PIRA bomb attached to their van in Lisburn. The bomb was made in such a way so as to ensure it exploded upwards, lowering the risk of collateral damage.
23 June	1988 British Army Lynx shootdown – A British Army Lynx helicopter was hit several times by heavy machine gun fire and brought down near Aughanduff Mountain, County Armagh, by a unit of the South Armagh Brigade.
7 July	Two civilians were killed in an PIRA bomb attack at the Falls Baths in West Belfast. In the follow-up operation a British Army bomb disposal officer was killed when he stepped on a pressure-plate bomb left nearby. His death marked 400 British Army deaths during the conflict.
23 July	Three civilians, a married couple and their six-year-old son, were killed in an PIRA bomb attack at Killeen, County Armagh. The bomb was intended for High Court Judge Eoin Higgins, who was returning from Dublin Airport.
1 August	The first Provisional IRA bomb to be successfully detonated on the UK mainland in four years was set off by a timer device at the Postal & Courier Depot Royal Engineers (BFPO London) in Inglis Barracks, Mill Hill, North London. The two storey building containing the single men's quarters was completely destroyed. One soldier, Lance Corporal Michael Robbins, was killed. Nine others were injured.
20 August	Ballygawley bus bombing – eight British Army soldiers (Blair Bishop, Peter Bullock, Jayson Burfitt, Richard Greener, Alexander Lewis, Mark Norsworthy, Stephen Wilkinson, and Jason Winter) were killed and twenty-eight wounded when the PIRA attacked their bus with a roadside bomb near Ballygawley, County Tyrone.
30 August	Three PIRA volunteers (Brian Mullin, and brothers Gerard and Martin Harte) were killed by the SAS near Drumnakilly, County Tyrone, as they attempted to kill an off-duty member of the Ulster Defence Regiment.
31 August	Two civilians were killed when an IRA booby trap bomb intended for the security forces exploded in a flat in Creggan, Derry. Another man later died from his injuries.
19 October	The British Government introduced the broadcasting ban on organisations believed to support terrorism – including 11 Loyalist and Republican groups and Gerry Adams' voice.

=== 1989 ===
12 February	Republican solicitor Pat Finucane was shot dead by the Ulster Freedom Fighters in front of his wife and two sons.
7 March	Three civilians were killed in an PIRA machine gun attack on a building in Coagh, County Tyrone, which they claimed was used by loyalists to plan attacks. The IRA claimed that one of the men killed, Leslie Dallas, was a UVF member.
20 March	Jonesborough Ambush – PIRA assassinated two high-ranking RUC officers, Superintendent Bob Buchanan and Chief Superintendent Harry Breen, near the Irish border outside Jonesborough, County Armagh.
22 September	Deal barracks bombing – eleven British military bandsmen were killed by a PIRA bomb at Deal Barracks in Kent, England.
October	Twenty-eight members of the (Ulster Defence Regiment) were arrested on suspicion of leaking security force documents to loyalist paramilitaries.
13 December	Attack on Derryard checkpoint – using machine guns, grenades, a flamethrower and an improvised armoured truck, the PIRA launched an assault on a British Army checkpoint near Rosslea, County Fermanagh, killing two British soldiers, Private James Houston and Lance-Corporal Michael Paterson. Two other soldiers were injured, one more severely than the other.

== 1990–1999 ==
=== 1990 ===
11 February	A British Army Gazelle helicopter was shot down by the PIRA's East Tyrone Brigade with machine gun fire over the border between Northern Ireland and the Republic of Ireland. Three soldiers on board were wounded.
9 April	Four British Army (Ulster Defence Regiment) soldiers were killed when the PIRA exploded a landmine under their patrol vehicle in Downpatrick, County Down. The blast was so powerful that the vehicle was hurled into a nearby field.
6 May	Operation Conservation – the British Army attempted to ambush a PIRA unit in South Armagh, but were counter-ambushed; one British soldier was killed.
20 July	The PIRA bombed the London Stock Exchange.
24 July	A PIRA landmine attack on an RUC patrol vehicle in Armagh killed three RUC officers (William Hanson, David Sterritt, and Joshua Willis) and a civilian (Sister Catherine Dunne, a Roman Catholic nun from Dublin).
30 July	Conservative MP for Eastbourne, Ian Gow, was assassinated in Pevensey, East Sussex, by a PIRA bomb planted in his car.
30 September	Two Catholic civilians (Martin Peake and Karen Reilly) speeding in a stolen vehicle at a checkpoint were shot dead by British Army soldiers in Belfast. Soldier Lee Clegg was convicted of murder, before being acquitted at a retrial in 1999.
24 October	Proxy bomb attacks – the PIRA launched three "proxy bombs" or "human bombs" at British Army checkpoints. Three men (who were or had been working with the British Army) were tied into cars loaded with explosives and ordered to drive to each checkpoint. Each bomb was detonated by remote control. The first exploded at a checkpoint in Coshquin, killing the driver and five soldiers. The second exploded at a checkpoint in Killeen, County Armagh; the driver, James McAvoy, narrowly escaped, albeit suffered a broken leg but one soldier (Irish Ranger Cyril J. Smith) was killed and 13 other soldiers were wounded. The third failed to detonate.
9 November	Peter Brooke, then Secretary of State for Northern Ireland, stated in a speech at London that "the British government has no selfish strategic or economic interest in Northern Ireland".
10 November	Lough Neagh ambush - A high-rank Special Branch RUC officer, an RUC constable, a former UDR member and a government civilian employee were shot and killed by an IRA unit while on a waterfowl hunting trip at Lough Neagh. At least one of the victims returned fire before being gunned down.
22 November	Margaret Thatcher resigned as British Prime Minister.

=== 1991 ===
3 February	The PIRA launched another "proxy bomb" attack on a British Army (Ulster Defense Regiment) base in Magherafelt, County Londonderry. The bomb caused major damage to the base and nearby houses, but the driver escaped before it exploded.
7 February	The PIRA launched three mortar shells at 10 Downing Street while the British Cabinet were holding a meeting. The shells landed in a garden. No members of the cabinet were injured, although four people received minor injuries, including two police officers.
3 March	1991 Cappagh killings – three PIRA volunteers (Malcolm Nugent, Dwayne O'Donnell, and John Quinn) and a Catholic civilian (Thomas Armstrong) were shot dead by the UVF at Boyle's Bar in Cappagh, County Tyrone. A 21-year-old man was badly wounded. The volunteers arrived in a car as a UVF gang was about to attack the pub. The UVF fired at the car (killing the volunteers) then fired into the pub (killing the civilian) but the alleged target, Brian Arthurs (brother of late PIRA volunteer Declan Arthurs, who had been killed at Loughgall) escaped.
28 March	1991 Drumbeg killings – three Irish Catholic civilians (including two teenage girls) were shot dead in a mobile shop in a Nationalist estate in Craigavon by the UVF Mid-Ulster Brigade using the covername Protestant Action Force.
29 April	The Combined Loyalist Military Command (CLMC) (acting on behalf of all loyalist paramilitaries) announced a ceasefire lasting until 4 July. This was to coincide with political talks between the four main parties (the Brooke-Mayhew talks).
31 May	Glenanne barracks bombing – the PIRA launched a large truck bomb attack on a British Army (Ulster Defence Regiment) base in County Armagh. Three soldiers (Lance Corporal Robert Crozier and Privates Paul Blakely and Sydney Hamilton) were killed; ten soldiers and four civilians were wounded. The blast left a deep crater and it could be heard over 30 miles away. Most of the UDR base was destroyed by the blast and the fire that followed. It was one of the largest bombs detonated during the Troubles in Northern Ireland.
3 June	Coagh ambush – the SAS shot dead three PIRA volunteers (Tony Doris, Lawrence McNally and Michael "Pete" Ryan) as they traveled in a car through Coagh, County Tyrone. The car burst into flames.
2 November	The PIRA exploded a bomb at the military wing of Musgrave Park Hospital in Belfast, killing two British soldiers. Eighteen people were also injured in the attack.
13 November	The PIRA carried out a series of attacks in Belfast targeting alleged loyalists, killing four people.
14 November	Two Catholic civilians and one Protestant civilian were killed as they were travelling home from work by the UVF.
15 November	A PIRA bomb detonated in St Albans, England. Two fatalities, both members of the PIRA (Patricia Black and Frankie Ryan), were the only casualties.
24 November	A PIRA time bomb went off at the loyalist wing of Crumlin Road Prison, killing two loyalist paramilitaries and injuring eight others.

=== 1992 ===
17 January	Teebane bombing – a PIRA landmine killed eight Protestant men and wounded six others at Teebane Crossroads near Cookstown, County Tyrone. The men had been working for the British Army at a base in Omagh and were returning home on a minibus. The PIRA said that the men were legitimate targets because they had been "collaborating" with the "forces of occupation". Shortly thereafter, Peter Brooke (Secretary of State for Northern Ireland) appeared on the Irish RTÉ Late Late Show and was persuaded to sing "Oh My Darling, Clementine". Unionists accused him of gross insensitivity for agreeing to do so.
4 February	1992 Sinn Féin Headquarters shooting – Allen Moore, a RUC officer from Comber, reportedly distraught by the killing of a colleague, walked into a Belfast Sinn Féin office and shot dead two Sinn Féin activists, Patrick Loughran (61) and Patrick McBride (aged 40), and one civilian, Michael O'Dwyer (aged 24), all Catholics. Moore drove away from the scene and later shot himself.
5 February	Sean Graham bookmakers' shooting – the UDA, using the covername "Ulster Freedom Fighters" (UFF), claimed responsibility for a gun attack on a bookmaker's shop on Lower Ormeau Road, Belfast. Five Catholic men and boys were killed (Christy Doherty, Jack Duffin, James Kennedy, Peter Magee, and William McManus). Nine others were wounded, one critically. This was claimed as retaliation for the Teebane bombing on 17 January 1992. In November 1992, the UDA carried out another attack on a betting shop in Belfast, killing three Catholic civilians and wounding thirteen.
16 February	Clonoe ambush – a PIRA unit attacked Coalisland RUC base in County Tyrone using a heavy machine gun mounted on the back of a stolen lorry. Following the attack, the British Army ambushed the unit in a graveyard. Four PIRA volunteers (Peter Clancy, Kevin Barry O'Donnell, Seán O'Farrell, and Patrick Vincent) were killed and two were wounded but escaped.
10 April	The PIRA exploded a truck bomb at the Baltic Exchange in London. Despite a telephoned warning, three civilians were killed. The bomb caused £800 million worth of damage.
1 May	Attack on Cloghoge checkpoint – the PIRA, using a van modified to run on railway tracks, launched an elaborate bomb attack on a British Army checkpoint in South Armagh. The checkpoint was obliterated. One soldier (Fusilier Andrew Grundy) was killed and 23 wounded.
12–17 May	Coalisland riots – after a PIRA bomb attack on a British Army patrol near Cappagh, County Tyrone, in which a soldier lost his legs, British paratroopers raided two public houses in Coalisland and caused considerable damage. This led, five day later, to a fist-fight between King's Own Scottish Borderers soldiers and locals, where automatic weapons were stolen and communications equipment smashed. Shortly thereafter, another group of British paratroopers arrived and fired on a crowd of civilians, wounding seven.
28 August	The PIRA's "South Armagh snipers" undertook their first successful operation, when a British Army soldier (Private Paul Turner) was shot dead on patrol in Crossmaglen, County Armagh.
4 September	Murder of Peter McBride – two British soldiers Mark Douglas Wright and James Fisher stopped and searched 18-year-old Catholic civilian Peter McBride after letting him go, they continued to follow him which caused McBride to panic and attempt to flee, resulting in the two to open fire on him, hitting him once causing him to slide over a car and fall over, they then shot him a second time as he lay wounded on the ground killing him instantly.
23 September	The PIRA exploded a 2000 lb bomb at the Northern Ireland Forensic Science Laboratory in South Belfast. The laboratory was obliterated, seven hundred houses were damaged, and 20 people were injured. The explosion could be heard from over 16 km away. It was one of the largest bombs to be detonated during the Troubles in Northern Ireland.

=== 1993 ===
26 February	Warrington bomb attacks – A bomb exploded at a gas storage facility in Warrington. It caused extensive damage but no injuries. While fleeing the scene, the bombers shot and injured a police officer and two of them were then caught after a high-speed car chase.
20 March	Warrington bomb attacks – after a telephoned warning, the PIRA exploded two bombs in Warrington, Cheshire, England. Two children (Johnathan Ball and Tim Parry) were killed and fifty-six people were wounded. There were widespread protests in Britain and Ireland following the deaths.
25 March	Castlerock killings – the UDA, using the covername "Ulster Freedom Fighters" (UFF), claimed responsibility for shooting dead four Catholic civilians and a PIRA volunteer at a building site in Castlerock, County Londonderry. Later in the day it claimed responsibility for shooting dead another Catholic civilian in Belfast.
24 April	Bishopsgate bombing – after a telephoned warning, the PIRA exploded a large bomb at Bishopsgate, London. It killed one civilian, wounded thirty others, and caused an estimated £350 million in damage.
23 September	Battle of Newry Road – at least three of five PIRA improvised tactical vehicles armed with automatic weapons engaged three helicopters, two Lynx and a RAF Puma carrying the 3rd Brigade Commander, over the British Army Barracks at Crossmaglen. A long pursuit ensued, involving the largest gunbattle between the British army and the PIRA in South Armagh. One heavy machine gun, two light machine guns and an AK-47 rifle were recovered by the security forces in the aftermath, while one Lynx and the Puma were hit.
23 October	Shankill Road bombing – seven civilians, one UDA member and one PIRA volunteer were killed when a PIRA bomb prematurely exploded at a fish shop on Shankill Road, Belfast. The PIRA's intended target was a meeting of loyalist paramilitary leaders, which was scheduled to take place in a room above the shop. However, unbeknownst to the PIRA, the meeting had been rescheduled.
30 October	Greysteel massacre – the UDA, using the covername "Ulster Freedom Fighters" (UFF), claimed responsibility for a gun attack on the Rising Sun Bar in Greysteel, County Londonderry. Eight civilians (six Catholic, two Protestant) were killed and twelve wounded. One gunman yelled "trick or treat!" before he fired into the crowded room; a reference to the Halloween party taking place. The UFF claimed that it had attacked the "nationalist electorate" in revenge for the Shankill Road bombing.
12 December	Fivemiletown ambush – A unit from PIRA's East Tyrone Brigade ambushed a two-men unmarked mobile patrol of the RUC in Fivemiletown, County Tyrone. Two constables (Andrew Beacom and Ernest Smith) were shot and killed instantly. A British Army Lynx helicopter was also fired at by a second IRA unit in the aftermath of the incident.
15 December	Downing Street Declaration – Irish Taoiseach Albert Reynolds and British prime minister John Major signed a joint declaration by which they agreed on both the right of the people of the island of Ireland to self-determination, and that Northern Ireland would be transferred to the Republic of Ireland from the United Kingdom only if a majority of its population was in favour of such a move.

=== 1994 ===
January	The broadcasting ban on Sinn Féin was lifted in the Republic of Ireland.
19 March	A British Army Lynx helicopter was shot down by the PIRA's South Armagh Brigade with an improvised mortar over the British Army barracks at Crossmaglen. Three soldiers and an RUC officer on board were wounded.
March	The PIRA carried out a series of mortar attacks on Heathrow Airport, London. Further attacks were carried out later in the month, but on each occasion the mortars failed to explode.
21 May	IRA volunteer Martin Doherty was shot dead in an attempted bombing by the UVF of the Widow Scallans pub in Dublin, which was hosting a republican meeting.
2 June	Twenty-nine people, most of them UK's senior Northern Ireland intelligence experts, including ten senior RUC officers, died during the 1994 Scotland RAF Chinook crash at Mull of Kintyre, Scotland. They were travelling from Belfast to a security conference in Inverness.
16 June	1994 Shankill Road killings: Three UVF members were killed by the INLA on the Shankill Road, Belfast.
18 June	Loughinisland massacre – the UVF shot dead six Catholic civilians (Eamon Byrne, Barney Greene, Malcolm Jenkinson, Daniel McCreanor, Patrick O'Hare, and Adrian Rogan) and wounded five others during a gun attack on a pub in Loughinisland, County Down.
12 July	A Royal Air Force Puma helicopter was shot down by the PIRA's South Armagh Brigade with an improvised mortar over a football pitch in Newtownhamilton. The aircraft was transporting a dozen soldiers and three crewmembers. No serious injures were reported.
31 July	Two senior UDA members, Raymond Elder and Joe Bratty, were shot dead by the PIRA on the Ormeau Road in Belfast.
31 August	The Provisional Irish Republican Army (PIRA) issued a statement which announced a complete cessation of military activities. This ceasefire was broken less than two years later.
16 September	The broadcasting ban on Sinn Féin was lifted in the UK.
13 October	The Combined Loyalist Military Command (CLMC) issued a statement which announced a ceasefire on behalf of all loyalist paramilitaries. The statement noted that "The permanence of our cease-fire will be completely dependent upon the continued cessation of all nationalist/republican violence".

=== 1995 ===
January	A delegation from Sinn Féin met with officials from the Northern Ireland Office.
February	The British and Irish governments released the Joint Framework document.
March	Gerry Adams attended a reception held by Bill Clinton at the White House.
July	Lee Clegg, a British Army paratrooper, was released from prison on the orders of Secretary of State Patrick Mayhew. Clegg had been jailed in 1993, for the murder of Catholic teenager Karen Reilly.
September	David Trimble was elected as the leader of the Ulster Unionist Party, following the resignation of James Molyneaux.

=== 1996 ===
9 February	London Docklands bombing – after a telephoned warning, the PIRA bombed the Docklands in London. The bomb killed two civilians (Inam Bashir and John Jeffries) and injured 39 others. It brought an end to the ceasefire after 17 months and 9 days.
18 February	Aldwych bus bombing — An (IRA) volunteer Edward O'Brien was carrying a bomb on a bus in London when it detonated prematurely, killing him and injuring eight other people.
10 June	Political talks at Stormont began without Sinn Féin.
15 June	Manchester bombing – after a telephoned warning, the PIRA exploded a bomb in Manchester, England. It destroyed a large part of the city centre and injured over 200 people. To date, it is the largest bomb to be detonated on the British mainland since the Second World War. There were no fatalities.
July	Drumcree conflict – the RUC decided to block the annual Orange Order march through the nationalist Garvaghy area of Portadown. In response, loyalist protestors attacked the RUC and blocked hundreds of roads across Northern Ireland. Eventually, the RUC allowed the march to continue, leading to serious rioting by nationalists across Northern Ireland.
7 October	The Provisional IRA exploded two bombs at the British Army HQ in Thiepval Barracks, Lisburn. A British soldier, Warrant Officer James Bradwell, died four days later of his wounds. 31 other people were wounded.

=== 1997 ===
12 February
A PIRA sniper shot dead a British soldier (Lance Bombardier Stephen Restorick) manning a checkpoint in Bessbrook, County Armagh. He was the last British soldier to be killed during Operation Banner.
5 April
The Grand National horse race was cancelled, and Aintree Racecourse evacuated following a hoax bomb warning from the PIRA. The race was eventually run several days later, 7 April, without disruption.
1 May
Tony Blair becomes UK Prime Minister after winning a landslide victory ending 18 years of Conservative rule.
June
For the first time since 1957, Sinn Féin won a seat in Dáil Éireann (Irish Parliament).
16 June
The PIRA shot dead two RUC officers (John Graham and David Johnston) on foot patrol on Church Walk, Lurgan, County Armagh. They were the last RUC officers killed before the signing of the Belfast Agreement in 1998.
6–9 July
Drumcree conflict – to ensure the Orange Order march could continue, the security forces sealed-off the nationalist Garvaghy area of Portadown. This sparked serious rioting in Portadown and across nationalist areas in Northern Ireland, an American immigrant, John Hemsworth was mortally wounded by the RUC as a result of the rioting. PIRA and INLA units became involved in several shootings and grenade attacks on security forces. After four days, the RUC released figures which showed that there had been 60 RUC officers injured; 56 civilians injured; 117 people arrested; 2,500 plastic bullets fired; 815 attacks on the security forces; 1,506 petrol bombs thrown; and 402 hijackings. This was the last time that the Orange Order's parade through nationalist areas around Drumcree was permitted by the authorities. One man John Hemsworth was mortally wounded after
20 July
The PIRA renewed its ceasefire.
September
Sinn Féin signed the Mitchell Principles.

Multi-party talks resumed.

27 December
INLA prisoners shot dead Loyalist Volunteer Force (LVF) leader and fellow prisoner Billy Wright inside the maximum-security Maze Prison. The LVF launched a number of revenge attacks over the following weeks.

=== 1998 ===
10 April	After two years of intensive talks, the Belfast Agreement (also known as the 'Good Friday Agreement' or the 'Stormont Agreement') was signed at Stormont in Belfast.
15 May	The Loyalist Volunteer Force (LVF) declared an "unequivocal ceasefire". The group hoped this would encourage people to vote against the Belfast Agreement.
22 May	Two referendums were held on the Belfast Agreement, one in Northern Ireland and one in the Republic of Ireland. In Northern Ireland the vote was 71.2% in favour, in the Republic of Ireland the vote was 94.39% in favour.
25 June	Northern Ireland Assembly elections were held. David Trimble was elected First Minister. Seamus Mallon was elected deputy.
5–12 July	Drumcree conflict – the annual Orange Order march was prevented from marching through the nationalist Garvaghy area of Portadown. Security forces and about 10,000 loyalists began a standoff at Drumcree church. During this time, loyalists launched 550 attacks on the security forces and numerous attacks on Catholic civilians. On 12 July, three children were burnt to death in a loyalist petrol bomb attack. This incident brought an end to the standoff.
1 August	1998 Banbridge bombing – a dissident republican group calling itself the Real IRA exploded a bomb in Banbridge, County Down. The RUC had just 20 minutes to clear the town before the bomb exploded causing an estimated £3.5 million of damage. Thirty-three civilians and two Royal Ulster Constabulary (RUC) officers were injured.
15 August	Omagh bombing – a dissident republican group calling itself the Real IRA exploded a bomb in Omagh, County Tyrone. It killed twenty-nine civilians (one of whom was pregnant with twins), making it the worst single bombing of the Troubles, in terms of civilian life lost.
22 August	The Irish National Liberation Army (INLA) declared a ceasefire.
16 October	John Hume and David Trimble jointly awarded the Nobel Peace Prize.
1998	Considered by many as the end of the Troubles. Violence nonetheless continues on a small-scale basis.

== Post-Troubles incidents (1999–2007) ==
=== 1999 ===
27 January	Former IRA volunteer and supergrass Eamon Collins was found dead near Newry, County Down. The South Armagh IRA were believed to have been responsible.
15 March	Solicitor Rosemary Nelson, who had represented the Garvaghy residents in the Drumcree dispute, was assassinated by a booby trapped car bomb in Lurgan, County Armagh. A loyalist group, Red Hand Defenders, claimed responsibility.
8 August	The INLA and its political wing the IRSP stated that "There is no political or moral argument to justify a resumption of the campaign".
1 December	Direct rule officially ended as power was handed over to the Northern Ireland Assembly.

=== 2000 ===
11 February	Direct rule was reinstated and the Northern Ireland Assembly suspended by new Secretary of State for Northern Ireland Peter Mandelson, citing insufficient progress on decommissioning.
27 March	The Bloody Sunday Inquiry began in Derry. It is the biggest public inquiry in British history.
29 May	Devolution was restored to the Northern Ireland Assembly.
2–12 July	Drumcree conflict – the annual Orange Order parade was banned from marching through the nationalist Garvaghy area of Portadown. The security forces erected large barricades to prevent loyalists from entering the area. About 2,000 British soldiers were deployed to keep order. During the standoff at Drumcree Church, loyalists continually launched missiles at the security forces.
28 July	The final prisoners were released from the Maze Prison, under the conditions of the Good Friday Agreement.
21 September	The Real IRA (RIRA) fired a rocket propelled grenade at MI6 headquarters in London, causing superficial damage.

=== 2001 ===
4 March	2001 BBC bombing – a Real IRA bomb exploded outside BBC Television Centre, causing some damage to the building.
19 June	Holy Cross dispute – RUC officers had to protect pupils and parents at Holy Cross Catholic Girls' School in Belfast, following attacks from loyalist protesters. The attacks resumed in September, following the school summer holidays, before subsiding in January 2002.
11–13 July	July 2001 Belfast riots – The worst rioting for several years took place in Belfast.
3 August	Ealing bombing – a Real IRA car bomb injured seven civilians in Ealing, west London.
23 October	The Provisional IRA began decommissioning of its weaponry.
4 November	The RUC was replaced by the Police Service of Northern Ireland (PSNI). Recruits were recruited on the basis of 50% Catholic, 50% Protestant.
11 November	November 2001 Belfast riots – Fierce riots take place in Belfast. One teenager is killed.
9 December	2001 South Armagh attacks – Republicans attack police and soldiers at two watchtowers in County Armagh.

=== 2002 ===
5 May	May 2002 Belfast riots
31 May – 7 June	2002 Short Strand clashes – major violence near a Catholic enclave in Belfast.

=== 2005 ===
12 July	Police were attacked with blast and petrol bombs during rioting in the Ardoyne area of Belfast, following an Orange Order parade. Eighty police officers were injured and several people were arrested.
28 July	The PIRA issued a statement declaring the end of its armed campaign and that it would verifiably put its weapons beyond use.
26 September	International weapons inspectors issue a statement confirming the full decommissioning of the PIRA's weaponry.
11–12 September	2005 Belfast riots – Following the rerouting of a controversial Orange Order Parade, rioting broke out in Belfast on a scale not seen for many years,
30 October	The Loyalist Volunteer Force (LVF) instructed its forces to "stand down".

=== 2006 ===
25 February	2006 Dublin riots
24 November	Michael Stone was arrested for breaking into the Stormont parliament buildings while armed. He would receive 16 years imprisonment for attempting to murder Martin McGuinness and Gerry Adams.

=== 2007 ===
7 March	Elections to the Northern Ireland Assembly took place.
26 March	DUP leader, Ian Paisley and Sinn Féin leader, Gerry Adams meet face-to-face for the first time, and the two come to an agreement regarding the return of the power-sharing executive in Northern Ireland.
3 May	The UVF and RHC issued a statement declaring an end to its armed campaign. The statement noted that they would retain their weapons but put them "beyond reach".
8 May	The new Northern Ireland Assembly met and the new Northern Ireland Executive was formed.
31 July	The British military's campaign in Northern Ireland (codenamed Operation Banner) officially ends.
11 November	The UDA issued a statement declaring an end to its armed campaign. The statement noted that they would retain their weapons but put them "beyond use".

== See also ==
- Outline of the Troubles
- Northern Ireland peace process
- List of bombings during the Troubles
- List of books about the Troubles
- List of chronologies of Provisional Irish Republican Army actions
- Timeline of Irish National Liberation Army actions
- Timeline of Continuity IRA actions
- Timeline of Real IRA and New IRA actions
- Timeline of Ulster Volunteer Force actions
- Timeline of Ulster Defence Association actions
- Timeline of Loyalist Volunteer Force actions
- Timeline of Orange Volunteers actions
- Provisional IRA in the Republic of Ireland
- List of Gardaí killed in the line of duty
- Operation Banner
