= List of terrorist incidents in 1976 =

This is a timeline of incidents in 1976 that have been labeled as "terrorism" and are not believed to have been carried out by a government or its forces (see state terrorism and state-sponsored terrorism).

== Guidelines ==
- To be included, entries must be notable (have a stand-alone article) and described by a consensus of reliable sources as "terrorism".
- List entries must comply with the guidelines outlined in the manual of style under MOS:TERRORIST.
- Casualties figures in this list are the total casualties of the incident including immediate casualties and later casualties (such as people who succumbed to their wounds long after the attacks occurred).
- Casualties listed are the victims. Perpetrator casualties are listed separately (e.g. x (+y) indicate that x victims and y perpetrators were killed/injured).
- Casualty totals may be underestimated or unavailable due to a lack of information. A figure with a plus (+) sign indicates that at least that many people have died (e.g. 10+ indicates that at least 10 people have died) – the actual toll could be considerably higher. A figure with a plus (+) sign may also indicate that over that number of people are victims.
- If casualty figures are 20 or more, they will be shown in **bold**. In addition, figures for casualties more than 50 will also be **underlined**.
- Incidents are limited to one per location per day. If multiple attacks occur in the same place on the same day, they will be merged into a single incident.
- In addition to the guidelines above, the table also includes the following categories:

0 people were killed/injured by the incident.
1–19 people were killed/injured by the incident.
20–49 people were killed/injured by the incident.
50–99 people were killed/injured by the incident.
100+ people were killed/injured by the incident.

== List ==
| Date | Type | Dead | Injured | Location | Details | Perpetrator | Part of |
|---|---|---|---|---|---|---|---|
| January 1 | Bombing | 81 | 0 | Al Qaysumah, Saudi Arabia | A flight from Beirut to Abu Dhabi is bombed by unknown perpetrators. | Unknown | Lebanese Civil War |
| January 4 | Mass shooting | 6 | 1 | County Armagh. Northern Ireland | Two Catholic families, the Reaveys and the O'Dowds, are murdered by members of the Ulster Volunteer Force. | Ulster Volunteer Force | The Troubles |
| January 5 | Mass shooting | 10 | 1 | Kingsmill, Northern Ireland | Kingsmill massacre: Ten Protestant textile factory workers were massacred when 11 gunmen ambushed their minibus, which was traveling along the Whitecross to Bessbrook road in County Armagh. The "South Armagh Republican Action Force" claimed responsibility. One worker was spared because he was Catholic, and one other worker survived despite being shot 18 times. In June 2011, the Historical Enquiries Team (HET) determined that the Irish Republican Army was responsible for the attack. | PIRA | The Troubles |
| February 3 | Hijacking | 1 | | Djibouti | Members of the Somali Coast Liberation Front hijack a school bus, killing one girl. | Somali Coast Liberation Front | |
| March 2 | Bombing | 2 | 85 | Sapporo, Japan | A time-bomb exploded at the Hokkaido Prefectural office, killing two, and injuring another 85. A member of a left-wing group was arrested by Japanese authorities on September 1. | East Asia Anti-Japan Armed Front | |
| March 17 | Car bombing | 4 | 12 | Dungannon, Northern Ireland | Ulster Volunteer Force bombing of a pub celebrating St. Patrick's Day, killing four civilians including two young boys. | Ulster Volunteer Force | The Troubles |
| April 19 | Assassination | 1 | 0 | Colombia | The M-19 executes union leader, Jose Raquel Mercado, held hostage since February. | M-19 | Colombian Conflict |
| May 9 | Shooting | 2 | 3 | Montejurra, Spain | Two members of the Carlist Party are killed and three wounded by neo-fascists | Warriors of Christ the King militants | Neofascist terrorism in Spain |
| June 5 | Bombing | 2 | | Belfast, Northern Ireland | Bombing of a bar frequented by Ulster Defence Association members. Two Protestant civilians are killed. | PIRA | The Troubles |
| June 5 | Shooting | 5 | | Belfast, Northern Ireland | Four gunmen from the Ulster Volunteer Force open fire on the Chlorane Bar, killing five men, three Catholic and two Protestant. The shootings were in retaliation for an IRA bombing earlier in the day. | Ulster Volunteer Force | The Troubles |
| June 16 | Kidnapping | 2 | | Beirut, Lebanon | US Ambassador Francis E. Meloy, Jr., and Economic Counselor Robert O. Waring were kidnapped by the Popular Front for the Liberation of Palestine and killed a short time later. | PFLP | |
| June 18 | Bombing | 1 | 1 | Buenos Aires, Argentina | The head of the Federal Police, General Cesáreo Ángel Cardozo, was killed by a bomb packed with 700 grams of TNT under his bed, also seriously wounding his wife. | Montoneros | Dirty War |
| July 2 | Shooting | 6 | 3 | Antrim, Northern Ireland | Members of the Ulster Volunteer Force attack a Catholic-owned pub, killing five Protestant civilians and one Catholic civilian. | Ulster Volunteer Force | The Troubles |
| July 2 | Bombing | 23 | 60+ | Buenos Aires, Argentina | Montoneros attacked the Federal Security Superintendency (also known as Federal Coordination) of the Federal Police, causing the collapse of the roof of the dining room when the place was full of officers having lunch. 23 people died, including one female civilian who was visiting, and about 60 were injured, in response for the coup d'état of March 24. | Montoneros | Dirty War |
| July 4 | Hostage-taking | 4 (+52) | 15+ | Kampala, Uganda | Hijacking of Air France Flight 139 (Tel Aviv-Paris) by PFLP and German Revolutionary Cells (Revolutionäre Zellen); four hostages, one Sayeret Matkal soldier and 45 Ugandan soldiers killed. | PFLP-EO; Uganda | Israeli–Palestinian conflict |
| July 21 | Bombing | 2 | 0 | Ireland | An IRA landmine kills Christopher Ewart-Biggs, the newly appointed British ambassador to the Republic of Ireland, and his secretary Judith Cook. | IRA | |
| August 16 | Car bombing | 2 | 20 | Keady, Northern Ireland | Ulster Volunteer Force subgroup the Glenanne gang car bombs a Catholic pub, killing two. | Glenanne gang (UVF) | The Troubles |
| September 10 | Hijacking, bombing | 1 | 1 | United States | Five Croatian nationalists hijack a plane en route from New York City to Chicago with a hoax bomb. At the same time, a bomb was discovered at Grand Central Station. One police officer was killed and another was wounded while they attempted to defuse it. | Croatian nationalists | Terrorism in the United States |
| September 12 | Bombing | 11 | 30 | Rosario, Argentina | A bomb blast kills ten policemen and two civilians and injures at least 30 people. | Montoneros | Dirty War |
| September 21 | Assassination, Car Bombing | 2 | 1 | Washington, D.C., United States | Orlando Letelier, a leading opponent of Chilean dictator Gen. Augusto Pinochet who was living in exile in the United States, was killed along with Ronni Karpen Moffitt, who was in the car along with her husband Michael, who worked for Letelier. | DINA | Terrorism in the United States |
| October 4 | Mass shooting | 5 | 10 | San Sebastián, Spain | Juan María de Araluce Villar, the government appointed president of Gipuzkoa Province, is killed along with his driver and three bodyguards by ETA. | ETA | Basque conflict |
| October 6 | Bombing | 73 | 0 | Bridgetown, Barbados | Bombing of Cubana de Aviación Flight 455 by Anti-Castro exiles. The Cuban government accused the CIA and Venezuelan DISIP of organizing the bombing. | Anti-Castro exiles | Cuban dissident movement |
| November 17 | Hostage-taking | 4 (+3) | | Amman, Jordan | Abu Nidal Organization fighters stormed the Intercontinental Hotel and seized several hostages. Security then stormed the hotel. In the ensuing fight 3 terrorists, 2 soldiers, and 2 civilians were killed. | Abu Nidal Organization | Israeli–Palestinian conflict |
| December 4 | Hostage-taking | 1 | | The Hague, Netherlands | Members of the RMS movement occupy the Indonesian consulate. One Indonesian official is killed. | Republik Maluku Selatan | |
| December 14 | Shooting | 1 | | Athens, Greece | Two terrorists killed Evangelos Mallios, a dishonorably discharged police officer and torturer during the Greek military junta of 1967–1974 | Revolutionary Organization 17 November | |

== See also ==
- List of terrorist incidents
- Air France Flight 139
