= Stag Inn attack =

1976 gun attack in Belfast

Stag Inn Attack
- Part of the Troubles
- Location: Milltown Road, Belvoir Park Forest, Belfast
- Date: 30 July 1976; 8.00 pm (GMT)
- Target: Protestants, Loyalists, Ulster Unionists
- Attack type: Mass shooting
- Weapon: Automatic rifles
- Deaths: 4
- Injuries: 6
- Perpetrator: Provisional IRA's Belfast Brigade under the covername Republican Action Force (RAF)

The Stag Inn attack was a sectarian gun attack, on 30 July 1976, carried out by a group of Belfast IRA Volunteers using the cover name Republican Action Force. Four Protestants, all civilians, the youngest being 48 years old and the eldest 70, were all killed in the attack with several others being injured. Three Catholics were killed the previous day in a Loyalist bomb attack, part of a string of sectarian attacks in Northern Ireland by different paramilitary organizations.

== Background ==
Since an IRA ceasefire was agreed upon with the British government which came into effect on 10 February 1975, Loyalist paramilitaries in Ulster – who were worried that the government was about to sell them out to the IRA and force them into a United Ireland – started carrying out large numbers of attacks against the Catholic community in the hopes of provoking sectarian backlash from the IRA or Irish National Liberation Army and bring an end to the ceasefire and IRA-British government talks.

The Ulster Volunteer Force and Ulster Defence Association used cover names for their sectarian attacks like Protestant Action Force, Ulster Freedom Fighters and Red Hand Commando. The majority of these attacks took place in Belfast and an area which was known as the "murder triangle" in parts of counties Armagh and Tyrone around Mid Ulster. On 5 April 1975, the Protestant Action Force carried out a bomb attack on a pub in the New Lodge area of Belfast killing two Catholic civilians. Later that same day, Irish Republicans carried out the Mountainview Tavern attack on Belfast's Shankill Road, killing four Protestant civilians and a UDA member, followed by the killing of a Catholic civilian by loyalists in the Ardoyne area.

The first attack claimed by the Republican Action Force was the Tullyvallen massacre in which five Protestant civilians were killed and seven others injured. The attackers used the prefix "South Armagh" Republican Action Force (SARAF) to claim this attack. All those killed were members of the Irish chapter of the Protestant fraternity group the Orange Order, which Irish Catholics in Northern Ireland viewed as a sectarian group. The smaller Irish Republican paramilitary group the Irish National Liberation Army (INLA) would also carry out at least one sectarian attack during this period, when, on New Year's Eve 1975/76 members of the INLA – using the cover name "People's Republican Army" – carried out a bomb attack on a pub in the village of Gilford, County Down killing three Protestant civilians and injuring 30 others.

The most lethal attack carried out by the RAF was the Kingsmill massacre on 5 January 1976. In the attack up to 12 gun men stopped a minibus near Kingsmill in south County Armagh and shot 11 Protestant workmen, all civilians, killing 10 and leaving the sole survivor badly wounded. Prior to the shooting, the gun men told a Catholic workman who was travelling on the minibus to run away.

== Attack ==
The Stag Inn was a Protestant-owned hotel and bar.

The attack took place on a Saturday at 8:00 pm on 30 July 1976 when at least 3 IRA/RAF gun men pulled up outside in a hijacked car and shot doorman John McLeave (48), who was standing outside the bar on security duty. Two of the gunmen entered the Stag Inn bar carrying automatic rifles and began shooting; John Mackey (50) and James Doherty (70), were both killed instantly from several bursts of fire. Several more people were hit, though Thompson "Robert" McCreight (60) would die from his injuries just over a week later on 8 August 1976. The gunmen escaped in the getaway car waiting outside for them. The attackers claimed it was retaliation for a loyalist attack the day before on the 29 July 1976, when three Catholic civilians were killed in The Whitefort Inn pub on the Andersonstown Road, Belfast. This was the last major sectarian attack claimed by the Republican Action Force in 1976.

== Aftermath ==
Earlier on in the day, the Provisional IRA Derry Brigade killed a Protestant Ulster Defence Regiment soldier with a booby-trap bomb at a farm in Druminard near the village of Moneymore. Less than 24 hours later, another Protestant was killed by Republican sniper at a security barrier at Church Street in Lurgan. This brought the number of Protestants killed in a 24-hour period by the IRA/RAF to six, with at least half a dozen injured.

The group claimed responsibility for the killings of two more Protestant civilians after the Stag Inn shootings: the first on the 2 April 1977 in Forkhill in south Armagh, and the other on 21 April 1977 near Shankill Road in Belfast. The former commander of the IRA's Belfast Brigade Brendan Hughes (who was in prison during the period) when interviewed by the journalist Peter Taylor commented on the effect of the sectarian killings in Belfast:

"When the ceasefire was on, the whole machine (the IRA) slipped into sectarianism and a lot of us were very, very unhappy with that situation. I didn't believe that Tullyvallen and other (similar) attacks were going to achieve anything. I believed they were counterproductive. Sectarian bombings and sectarian killings were doing nothing except destroying the whole struggle".

A month later on 16 August 1976, in the south Armagh village of Keady, the UVF along with members of the Glenanne gang carried out the 1976 Step Inn pub bombing killing two Catholic civilians, both women, and injuring 20 others. The tit-for-tat sectarian attacks largely died down after this attack.

== See also ==
- Store Bar shooting
- Bayardo Bar attack
