= Walker's Bar attack =

1976 mass shooting in Templepatrick, Northern Ireland

- Part of the Troubles
- Location: 54°10′22″N 6°36′53″W; Lyle Hill Road, Templepatrick, County Antrim, Northern Ireland
- Date: 25 June 1976
- Attack type: Mass shooting
- Weapons: Automatic rifle, grenade or bomb
- Deaths: 3
- Injuries: 6
- Perpetrator: Republican Action Force

The Walker's Bar attack, also known as the Store Bar shooting, was a mass shooting which took place on 25 June 1976 at Walker's Bar (also known as the Store Bar) on Lyle Hill Road in Templepatrick, County Antrim in Northern Ireland. It was carried out by the Republican Action Force. The attack, in which three people were killed, was one of several "tit-for-tat" mass shootings, during The Troubles, in mid-1976.

== Attack ==
Three weeks after the Ulster Volunteer Force undertook a gun attack on the Chlorane Bar in Belfast, a Republican Action Force group attacked Walker's Bar in County Antrim.

At the time of the attack, a Friday evening, a cabaret show was taking place, and the bar contained approximately 40 people. The attackers sprayed the pub with an ArmaLite AR-15 assault rifle. While some sources suggest that a grenade was thrown into the bar before the attackers escaped, contemporary news sources state that a bomb was left behind.

Three people were killed and approximately six were injured. Those killed, all Protestant civilians from the same extended family, included Ruby Kidd (28), Francis Walker (17) and Joseph McBride (56).

The "West Belfast Republican Action Force" subsequently claimed responsibility for the shooting, stating that it was "carried out in retaliation" for the Chlorane Bar attack earlier in June 1976.

== Aftermath ==
A week after the gun attack in Templepatrick, the UVF carried out a gun attack on a Catholic-owned pub, the Ramble Inn. While described as a "reprisal" for the Walker's bar attack, five of the six people killed in the Ramble Inn attack were Protestants, while the other victim was Catholic. Considered a failure or "own goal" by the UVF, the attack was carried out because the bar owners where Catholics and the gunmen expected that the patrons would mainly be Catholic.

== See also ==
- Mountainview Tavern attack
- Tullyvallen massacre
- Stag Inn attack
