= Killing of John Pat Cunningham =

Mentally disabled man killed by British soldiers

John Pat Cunningham
- Born: John Patrick Cunningham c. 1947; Northern Ireland
- Died: 15 June 1974 (aged 27); Benburb, County Tyrone, Northern Ireland
- Cause of death: Gunshot wounds
- Known for: Shot and killed while running away from soldiers

John Patrick Cunningham (c. 1947 – 15 June 1974) was a Catholic Irish man who had an intellectual and learning disability, who was shot and killed in June 1974 while running from British soldiers in a field near his home in Benburb, County Tyrone.

== Personal life ==
John Pat Cunningham was born in c. 1947 in Northern Ireland.

He was described as having the mental age of between six and 10 years old, and was known to have been afraid of men in "uniform", including soldiers, police and priests. He was also known to attempt to run away from such people.

In 1973, Cunningham's GP found him hiding from soldiers in a ditch, who were attempting to arrest him. Cunningham’s GP informed the RUC and British Army about Cunningham's fear of uniformed men.

== Death ==
On 15 June 1974, John Pat Cunningham was walking home from church where he sometimes volunteered; While on his way home he encountered ten soldiers of the Life Guards in a Land Rover on Carickaness Road. Due to his fear of soldiers, he ran into a nearby field in an attempt to flee.

The soldiers spotted Cunningham and got out of the Land Rover; Dennis Hutchings got out first and ran to the middle of the field, Soldier B took position at a gateway to the field and Soldier E followed Hutchings. The other six stayed at the Land Rover. The three men then ordered Cunningham to stop, but he kept running. Hutchings cocked his rifle and fired three shots at Cunningham and Soldier B fired two, at around 11.50 am. Three of the five shots hit Cunningham in the back, the unit's doctor, Soldier K pronounced Cunningham dead at 12.15 pm. A local priest spotting Cunningham went to give him his last rites. When the soldiers prevented him from doing so, the priest said "If you want to stop me, you will have to shoot me".

== Trial ==
In 2017, Dennis Hutchings was charged with the attempted murder of John Pat Cunningham. Hutchings applied to stay the prosecution which was denied. He then appealed to the Supreme Court to have the decision to try him in a Diplock Court overturned which was unanimously dismissed. He sought a judicial review by the High Court which was similarly dismissed.

From November to October 2021 Hutchings faced a trial for attempted murder, but he could only stand trial for three days, as he required treatment for his chronic kidney disease. He was also suffering from heart failure.

On 4 October 2021, Hutchings's trial was adjourned for three weeks after he was hospitalised due to COVID-19. 12 days later, on 18 October 2021, Hutchings died at the age of 80 from complications brought on by COVID-19. The decision to prosecute Hutchings was criticised by unionist politicians in light of his age and health, as well as wider issues surrounding prosecutions of army personnel related to the Troubles.

Cunningham's family sued the Ministry of Defence in the High Court, claiming a conspiracy in relation to John Patrick's death. They settled in 2026 for undisclosed damages without any admission of liability.

== Ministry of Defence Response. ==
In 2011, the Historical Enquiries Team of the PSNI issued a report which found that Cunningham posed no threat. It also found that the soldiers involved did not provide full accounts of the incident, which hindered investigations at the time.

In response to the HET report in 2013, Andrew Robathan, Minister for the Armed Forces, issued an apology on the behalf of the Ministry of Defence. In 2022, the family returned the written apology. They felt that Hutchings' being awarded a military funeral and having a memorial plaque installed in the Palace Barracks Memorial Garden had rendered the apology worthless. They had requested any memorial be placed in Hutchings' home county of Cornwall. The Ministry of Defence responded that any memorial in the garden were privately financed and not an officially recognised memorial.
