= Central Bar bombing =

Terrorist attack in Gilford, Northern Ireland

- Part of the Troubles
- Location: 55°02′28″N 7°00′36″W; Gilford, County Down, Northern Ireland
- Date: 31 December 1975 (GMT)
- Attack type: Bombing
- Weapon: 5 - 10 lb Time bomb
- Deaths: 3
- Injuries: 25
- Perpetrator: claimed by "Armagh People's Republican Army" a covername for the Irish National Liberation Army Armagh Brigade

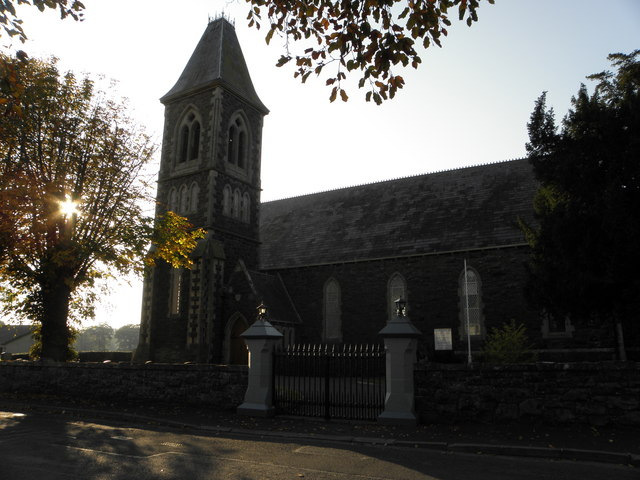
All Saints Church, Gilford, close to the bomb site

The Central Bar bombing was a bomb attack on a pub in the town of Gilford near Portadown in County Down in Northern Ireland on 31 December 1975. The attack was carried out by members of the Irish National Liberation Army (INLA) using the covername "People's Republican Army" although contemporary reports also said the "Armagh unit" of the "People's Republican Army" (the name under which the INLA operated throughout 1975) had claimed responsibility. Three Protestant civilians were killed in the bombing.

== Background ==
A lot of members of the Official IRA (OIRA) were not happy with a ceasefire the group called in 1972 and in December 1974 the dissenters in the OIRA set up the Irish National Liberation Army (INLA) and a political wing called the Irish Republican Socialist Party (IRSP).

1975 was one of the worst years of "The Troubles" for attacks with civilian casualties with Loyalist paramilitaries carrying out attacks including the Strand Bar Bombing, the Miami Showband killings and the attacks at Donnellys bar and Kays tavern. And Republican paramilitaries carrying out attacks including the Mountainview Tavern attack, the Bayardo Bar and the Tullyvallen Orange Hall massacre. All of these attacks saw high numbers of civilian deaths and injuries.

On 15 December 1975 the Ulster Volunteer Force (UVF) killed Ronald Trainor a 17-year-old member of the IRSP after a bomb attack on his house in Ballyoran Park in Portadown.

== The bombing ==
Henry MacDonald and Jack Holland said that it seemed the attack was in revenge for the killing of IRSP member Ronald Trainor two weeks earlier by the UVF.

On 31 December (New Year's Eve) 1975 an INLA unit planted a time bomb in a duffel bag in the Central Bar pub in the mainly Protestant town of Gilford near Portadown.

The bomb, which contained 5–10 pounds of explosives, went off at around 21:10. A customer walked inside the bar where he saw the cylinder shape bomb in the hall of the pub & alerted people to the danger, most of the customers were in the lounge area of the pub and it went off almost instantly as the customer shouted the warning. The explosion killed three Protestant civilians, Richard Beattie (44), William Scott (28) and Sylvia McCullough (31) who died of her injuries the day after. 25 other people were injured in the bombing, two of them seriously and were taken to the Craigavon Area Hospital by ambulances. The pub itself suffered severe structural damage, especially to the front wall of the building.

=== Claim ===
Initially, the BBC said the South Armagh Republican Action Force (the group who carried out the Tullyvallen massacre ) carried out the bombing, but a caller later claimed the bombing attack was carried out by the "(Armagh) People's Republican Army".

== Conviction ==
A 29-year-old Portadown INLA member Francis Corry was given 4 life sentences in December 1979 for the three Central Bar killings and for that of 14-year-old Portadown boy, Thomas Rafferty killed by a booby-trap bomb in February 1976.

== Aftermath ==
On 5 January 1976, just six days after the bar bombing ten Protestant workmen were shot dead and one badly injured by a group calling itself the South Armagh Republican Action Force near Kingsmill in Armagh. This attack left 10 Protestant civilians dead. The night before that attack on the 4 January 1976, the UVF killed six Catholics in two separate attacks.

== See also ==
- Darkley killings
- Droppin Well bombing
- Irish People's Liberation Organization
- Timeline of Irish National Liberation Army actions

== Sources ==
- Jack Holland, Henry McDonald, INLA – Deadly Divisions'
- CAIN project
