= Ramble Inn attack =

1976 UVF shooting near Antrim, Northern Ireland

- Part of The Troubles
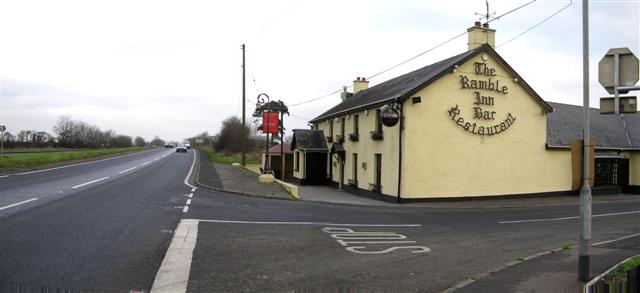
- The Ramble Inn in 2007

- location of Ramble Inn public house
- Location: 54°45′44.9″N 6°14′35.2″W; Ramble Inn, 236 Lisnevenagh Road, Antrim, Northern Ireland
- Date: July 2, 1976
- Attack type: Mass shooting
- Deaths: 6 civilians (5 Protestant, 1 Catholic)
- Injuries: 3

The Ramble Inn attack was a mass shooting at a rural pub on 2 July 1976 near Antrim, Northern Ireland. It is believed to have been carried out by the Ulster Volunteer Force (UVF), a loyalist paramilitary organisation. Six civilians were killed in the attack—five Protestants and one Catholic—and three others were wounded.

== Background ==
The mid-1970s was one of the deadliest periods of the Troubles. From February 1975 until February 1976, the Provisional Irish Republican Army (IRA) and British Government observed a truce. This, however, marked a rise in sectarian tit-for-tat killings. Ulster loyalist paramilitaries, fearing they were about to be forsaken by the British Government and forced into a united Ireland, increased their attacks on Irish Catholics and nationalists. Under orders not to engage British forces, some IRA units concentrated on tackling the loyalists. The fall-off of regular operations had caused serious problems of internal discipline and some IRA members engaged in revenge attacks also. The tit-for-tat killings continued after the truce ended. On 5 June 1976, the UVF shot dead three Catholics and two Protestants in an attack on the Chlorane Bar. This was claimed as revenge for the killing of two Protestants in a pub earlier that day.

On 25 June 1976, IRA gunmen opened fire inside a Protestant-owned pub in Templepatrick, County Antrim. Three Protestant civilians died. The attack was claimed by the "Republican Action Force", which was believed to be a cover name used by some members of the IRA.

== Attack ==
The Ramble Inn lies just outside Antrim, on the main A26 Antrim to Ballymena dual carriageway, near the village of Kells. The pub was owned by Catholics but in a rural area of County Antrim which is mostly Protestant. Most of its customers were Protestants from the surrounding area.

On the night of Friday 2 July 1976, a three-man UVF unit consisting of a driver and two gunmen stole a car from a couple parked in nearby Tardree Forest. The couple were gagged and bound before the men made off in the car. At about 11PM, just before closing time, two masked gunmen in boiler suits entered the pub and opened fire with machine guns, hitting nine people. Three died at the scene and a further three died later.

The victims were Frank Scott (75), Ernest Moore (40), James McCallion (35), Joseph Ellis (27) and James Francey (50), all Protestants, and Oliver Woulahan (20), a Catholic. Four of them—Scott, Moore, McCallion and Woulahan—died on 2 July while Ellis died of his wounds on 7 July and Francey surviving until 14 July. Scott and Moore were both from Creavery Terrace in Antrim, Francey from Lisnevenagh Road in the town, McCallion and Ellis from Cullybackey and Woulahan—who was celebrating his 20th birthday on the night of that attack—from the Old Cushendun Road in Newtown Crommelin.

== Aftermath ==
On 3 July at 12:30PM, an anonymous caller to The News Letter claimed the attack was in retaliation for the earlier attack in Templepatrick. It is widely believed that the UVF carried out the Ramble Inn attack. A relative of one of the victims later said: "The strong contention remains that it was one of the main Protestant paramilitary groups and that they remained silent when it transpired that most of the victims came from the Protestant community". In the weeks that followed a number of people were interviewed by police in relation to the shooting but were subsequently released without charge. To date, no one has been convicted of the attack.

In 2012 the Historical Enquiries Team (HET), a body which had been set up in Northern Ireland to re-investigate unsolved murders of the Troubles, met with the family of James McCallion to deliver their findings. The probe concluded that the then Northern Ireland police force, the Royal Ulster Constabulary (RUC), had conducted a thorough investigation and the detectives working on the case did their best to bring the killers to justice.

In April 1999 the dissident Loyalist paramilitary group the Orange Volunteers exploded a pipe bomb outside the Ramble Inn pub, damaging several cars. Nobody was hurt in the attack.
