= Murder of Eileen Doherty =

1972 murder of a catholic woman

- Location: Belfast, Northern Ireland
- Date: 30 September 1973; 53 years ago
- Attack type: Murder by gunshot
- Victims: Eileen Doherty, John Sherry
- Perpetrators: Robert "Bobby" Rodgers, unidentified male

Eileen Doherty
- Born: c. 1954; Belfast, County Antrim, Northern Ireland
- Died: 1 October 1973 (aged 19); Belfast, County Antrim, Northern Ireland
- Cause of death: Cerebral laceration
- Partner: Alec McManus

Eileen Doherty (c. 1954 – 1 October 1973) was a Catholic Belfast resident, who worked as a stitcher. She was fatally wounded in a sectarian attack on 30 September 1973, by Bobby Rodgers (born 18 October 1953), a member of the Ulster Volunteer Force.

== Background ==
Eileen Doherty was born in c. 1954, in Belfast. She grew up in a Catholic household in the Andersonstown area.

Doherty was engaged to her long time boyfriend Alexander 'Alec' McManus.

== Murder ==
On 30 September 1973, Doherty spent the day with her fiancé Alec McManus in the Lower Ormeau Road area, and spent some of the evening at his house. At around 10:45 p.m. after Doherty left McManus' house, she got in a Atlas Taxi driven by a man named John Sherry on the corner of Cooke Street and Ormeau Road. After she got in the passenger seat Sherry then picked up Robert James Shaw "Bobby" Rodgers (then aged 19) and a unidentified man in his 20's. Both men were members of the Ulster Volunteer Force and both men appeared to be intoxicated.

As Sherry was about to turn on Governor's Bridge, Rodgers pressed a .45 calibre revolver against Sherry's head and told him and Doherty to get into the back seat. When Sherry and Doherty got out of the car, they tried to escape, running across King's Bridge and onto the Annadale Embankment. Sherry and Doherty stopped running but when Sherry again saw the taxi, he told Doherty to keep running. Doherty attempted to escape by climbing over a wire fence, but ended up getting stuck. The taxi stopped, Rodgers got out of the passenger seat and grabbed Doherty by the arm and shot her, twice in the body and once in the head. Rodgers and the other man then drove off in the taxi.

A witness, named McDonald, cycled past the taxi as Rodgers shot Doherty. McDonald saw Doherty lying on her side in the grass motionless and went to her aide attempting to tend to her head wound, while Sherry called an ambulance at a nearby telephone kiosk.

Doherty was rushed to the Royal Victoria Hospital, but ultimately succumbed to her wounds the next morning at 1.05am. Sherry's blue Chrysler was found later that day, abandoned at Fountainville Avenue in the Lisburn Road area.

== Aftermath ==
In May 1974 Alec McManus' brother-in-law lost his arm in the Rose & Crown Bar bombing. His brother Jim McManus was also reportedly critically injured in a separate sectarian attack.

On 25 September 1975, Bobby Rodgers shot 18-year-old electrical wholesaler, Kieran William McIlroy (born c. 1954) several times as he was returning home from work, on Park End Street.

Rodgers, and another UVF member who accompanied Rodgers during the murder, were both arrested for McIlroy's murder after someone who had witnessed the shooting pointed him out to a nearby military patrol. Rodgers would receive a life sentence for McIlroy's murder, but was released in July 1990 after around 16 years.

Alec McManus' 54-year-old brother William "Willie" McManus Sr. was killed in the Sean Graham bookmakers' shooting in February 1992.

In late September 2010 the Police Service of Northern Ireland reopened Doherty's murder case after 37 years. Later that year in December two men, Bobby Rodgers and another man both aged 57 were arrested for their involvement in Doherty's murder. Rodgers was then subsequently charged with Doherty's murder.

In February 2013 Rodgers would be brought to court in the trial The Queen v. Robert James Shaw Rodgers. After around 45 minutes Justice Mark Horner sentenced Rodgers to life imprisonment for the murder of Eileen Doherty. Before he was convicted, Rodgers applied to have a Royal Prerogative of Mercy through the intervention of the Northern Ireland Secretary of State, on the basis of the time served with his previous McIlroy murder conviction. This application was denied by the courts. Rodgers was found to have committed the murder after palm prints matched those found at the scene of the murder. The court found that Rodgers' motive for the murder was purely sectarian.
