= Chlorane Bar attack =

1976 shooting in a Belfast pub

- Part of The Troubles
- Location: 54°36′06.36″N 5°55′57.28″W; Chlorane Bar, 23 Gresham Street, Belfast, Northern Ireland
- Date: 5 June 1976; 22.00 (BST)
- Attack type: mass shooting
- Weapons: 2 .45-revolvers, 1 9mm pistol, 1 .22 pistol
- Deaths: 5 civilians (3 Catholic, 2 Protestant)
- Perpetrator: UVF

The Chlorane Bar attack was a mass shooting at a city centre pub on 5 June 1976 in Belfast, Northern Ireland. It was carried out by the Ulster Volunteer Force (UVF), an Ulster loyalist paramilitary organisation, apparently in retaliation for the Provisional IRA bombing attack on the Times Bar on York Road, in which two Protestant civilians were killed. In the Chlorane attack, five civilian men were killed; three Catholics and two Protestants. The gunmen were militants from the UVF Belfast Brigade's Shankill Road battalion. The assault was a joint operation by the platoons based at the Brown Bear and the Windsor Bar, drinking haunts in the Shankill Road district frequented by UVF members.

== The attack ==
=== Buildup to the shootings ===
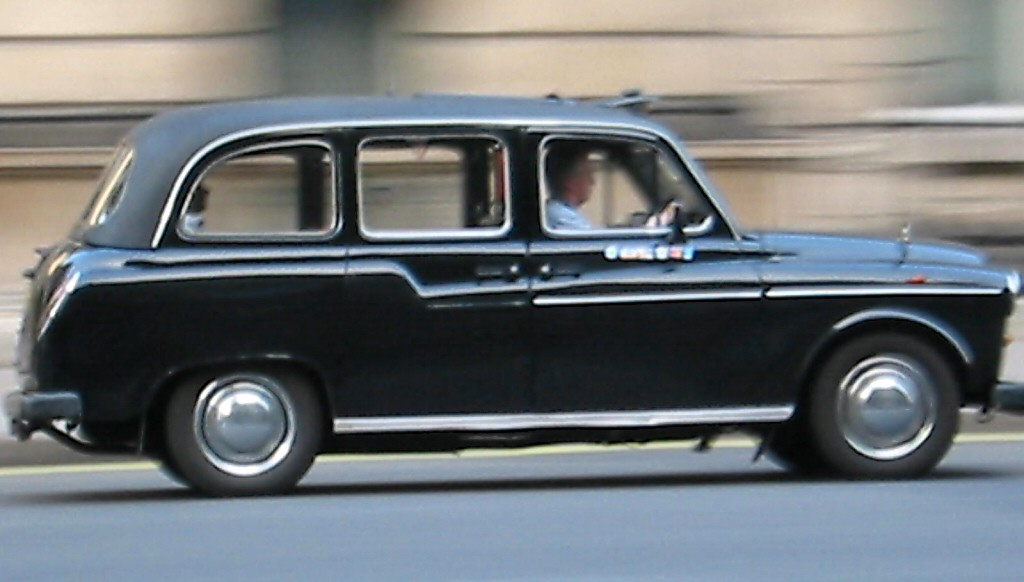
A hijacked black taxi, similar to the model shown here, was used to transport the UVF gunmen to the Chlorane Bar

On 5 June 1976, a bomb exploded at the door of the Times Bar on York Road, killing two Protestants. The pub was frequented by members of the Ulster Defence Association (UDA), a legal loyalist paramilitary group. Irish republicans were blamed for the bombing. Shortly after, the UVF Brigade Staff (its Shankill Road-based leadership) decided to hit back by attacking the Chlorane Bar. It was a hastily arranged operation devised by its military commander "Bunter" (whom investigative journalist Martin Dillon refers to as "Mr F"). The Chlorane Bar was located at 23 Gresham Street in Belfast's city centre, near Smithfield Market. Its clientele was mixed (Protestant and Catholic), which was unusual during The Troubles. On 17 August 1973, the Chlorane Bar had been firebombed; however, nobody was injured as the pub was closed at the time of the attack. Later that same month, the Ulster Freedom Fighters (UFF) claimed responsibility for a car bomb which exploded in Gresham Street. Although there were no human casualties, a pet shop located near the bomb's epicentre was damaged in the blast and a number of animals inside the building were either killed or injured.

The attack was planned and executed by the UVF platoons based at the Brown Bear and the Windsor Bar respectively. These were two pubs located on the Shankill Road and regularly frequented by UVF members. Dillon has referred to the former platoon as the "Brown Bear Team" because the members generally met at that particular pub, which faced Shankill Library on the corner of Mountjoy Street. To carry out the attack, along with the procuring of weapons and masks, a black taxi was hijacked by two young men outside the Long Bar on the Shankill to transport the gunmen to the Chlorane. Taxi driver Mark Hagan and a passenger were held hostage at the Windsor Bar.

Dillon suggests the Chlorane Bar was chosen for its nearness to the Shankill Road, affording the attackers a speedy getaway. Dillon devotes several pages to the Chlorane Bar attack in his book The Shankill Butchers: the real story of cold-blooded mass murder. There was not much of a security presence that evening in the area. The driver of the taxi, with four specifically chosen armed men seated in the rear of the vehicle in the manner of genuine passengers, made his way from the Shankill Road to North Street and turned south into Gresham Street. Upon arrival outside the Chlorane Bar, the four gunmen donned their masks, devised from yellow money bags, and exited the taxi.

=== The shootings ===
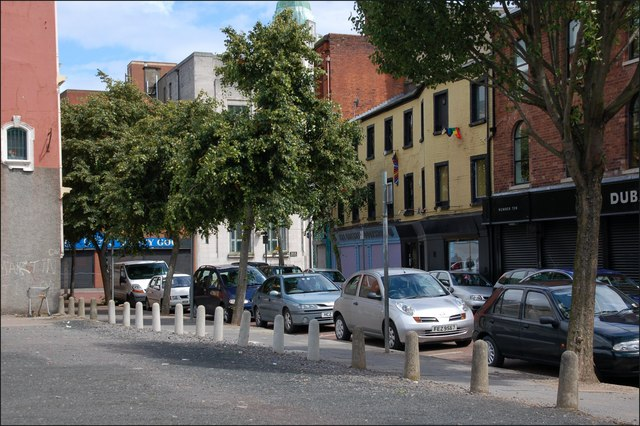
Gresham Street in 2007. The carpark in the foreground was the site of the Chlorane Bar.

At 10:00 pm, the four masked gunmen stormed through Chlorane Bar's front door leading to the public bar. There were about 16 customers inside the pub at the time; a survivor had described the atmosphere as having been "happy". One of the four gunmen was Robert "Basher" Bates, a member of the violent Shankill Butchers gang led by Lenny Murphy, who was in police custody at the time the attack against the Chlorane took place. Bates was the only one of the four to have been from the "Brown Bear Team". The hit squad was commanded by a "Mr G", leader of the Windsor Bar UVF platoon, with "Mr D" as his second-in-command and "Mr C" completing the team. Entering the bar in single file, "Mr G" ordered everybody to stand up, and then asked the startled customers whether there were any "Prods" (Protestants) among them. William Greer, a Protestant, thinking the gunmen were from the IRA, quickly fled to the men's toilet where he placed his feet up against the door. Customer Frederick Graham and his girlfriend, Pat Mahood, assumed the same thing. "Mr G" told the customers to separate into two groups, with the Protestants standing at the bottom end of the bar, and the Catholics at the top.

When one man, Edward Farrell, admitted to being a Catholic the UVF men opened fire. Farrell had tried to run towards the toilet but was shot dead. The Catholic owner of the Chlorane, 64-year-old James Coyle, had been standing behind the bar when he was hit at close-range. The bullet entered his heart and he died instantly. The gunmen continued firing; two Protestant men, Daniel McNeil and Samuel Corr, were also struck by the hail of bullets. McNeil was killed on the spot and Corr was fatally wounded. Another Catholic man, John Martin, was shot and died of his injuries on 23 June. Several other customers were hit as gunfire was sprayed around the bar. One customer pretended to be dead; however, a gunman walked over to where he lay and deliberately fired three shots into his thigh, knee, and below the ankle. The man later recounted that he had then looked up to see "men lying shot all over the place". William Greer, hiding in the toilet, had been shot when one of the gunmen fired through the door. He survived despite being hit in the leg and neck. There had been more customers upstairs in the lounge area, but although they heard the gunshots, the gunmen never went near them. Dillon maintained that it had not been the UVF unit's intention to kill any Protestants.

"Mr G" called a halt to the shooting, saying "that's it", and the four-man UVF team nonchalantly walked out of the pub and re-entered the hijacked black taxi, which had been parked so the driver could have easy access to North Street; this route offered a quick return to the Shankill. After the four men got into the back seat, the driver ("Mr. H") drove off. As the taxi passed by the Catholic Unity Flats area, three shots were fired from the vehicle. Two young men walking nearby got a look at the driver. He was described as being around 38 to 40 years old and having shoulder-length, black curly hair. Upon the taxi's return to the Shankill, Mark Hagan and the passenger were released. They immediately went to the Tennent Street Royal Ulster Constabulary (RUC) Station off the Shankill where they reported the taxi's hijacking. The shooting team proceeded to the Long Bar pub where "Mr I" (commander of UVF 1st Battalion) procured a forty-ounce bottle of vodka for "Mr G" and "Mr D" - their payment for having led the operation.

=== Aftermath ===
Having heard the gunshots, a barmaid serving in the upstairs lounge went downstairs to investigate and discovered the body of her employer, James Coyle lying on the floor behind the bar and those of the other dead and wounded. The first policeman on the scene was Constable George McElnea, from the RUC Special Patrol Group in Tennent Street. He quickly noticed the pile of bodies near the men's toilet as Samuel Corr stumbled towards him, gravely injured. McElnea placed Corr on a bench and offered what assistance he could but to no avail; Corr died of his gunshot wounds before the ambulance arrived. Alan McCrum, a Scenes of Crime officer, appeared at the Chlorane fifteen minutes after the shootings. He retrieved 24 spent bullet cases from the floor and determined that most of the shots had been fired at the rear of the pub. Later ballistic testing established that the weapons used in the attack were a .22 caliber pistol, a .9mm pistol, and two .45 snub-nosed revolvers. Police believed one of the victims, Daniel McNeil, had tenuous UVF connections, although he was not an active member.

The hijacked black taxi was found by police the following morning in a cul-de-sac in Beresford Street, off the Shankill Road. A cyclist, who had witnessed the masked gunmen entering the Chlorane Bar, described the four men as having been in the 20 to 30 age group, were all about 5'10 in height and well-built; the last gunman to enter had shoulder-length brown hair. The witness had gone to a nearby British Army post where he told soldiers what he had seen.

Ten days after the gun attack, the Chlorane Bar was blown up by a bomb. Three weeks after the attack the Provisional IRA, using their sometime cover-name of the "Republican Action Force", entered Walker's Bar in Templepatrick and killed three Protestant civilians in retaliation for the Chlorane attack. As part of this series of deadly tit for tat attacks on pubs, the UVF responded by killing six customers at the Catholic-owned Ramble Inn outside Antrim.

No one was ever charged with the shootings. In February 1979, Bates was convicted of the murders he had committed as part of the Shankill Butchers, and given ten life sentences. In his statement to the police following his arrest in 1977, he recounted his role in the Chlorane Bar attack. He alleged while working as a barman in the Long Bar on the evening of 5 June 1976, he had been approached by the UVF military commander, "Mr F", who informed him of a job in which he was to take part that same evening. It was decided to attack the city centre pub in retaliation for the IRA's earlier bombing of The Times pub. Bates went on to say that "Mr I" had provided the weapons which were used in the shooting and "Mr J" (UVF Provost Marshal) had procured the masks. Bates claimed that his revolver had malfunctioned and therefore had never fired his gun during the attack; however, forensic evidence proved that two .45 revolvers had been fired inside the Chlorane. Upon his release from the Maze Prison, Bates was gunned down in June 1997 by the son of James Curtis Moorhead, a UDA man he had killed in 1977.

== See also ==
- Timeline of Ulster Volunteer Force actions
- McGurk's Bar bombing
- Greysteel massacre
- Loughinisland massacre
