= Newtownhamilton =

Village in County Armagh, Northern Ireland

Coordinates: 54.19058°N 6.57644°W

Newtownhamilton: Irish: An Baile Úr
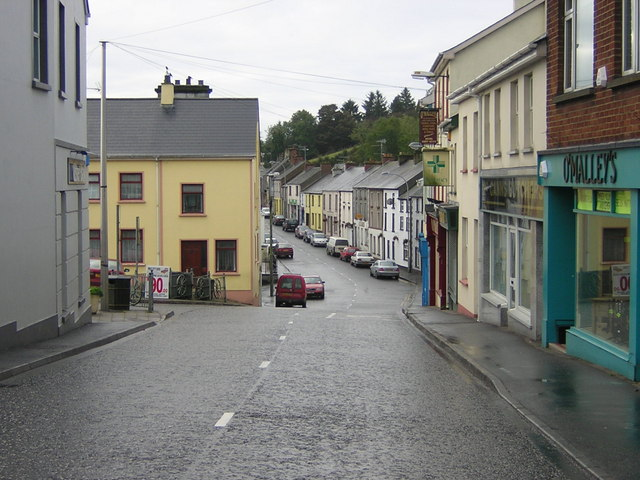
- Village centre, looking south

- Location within Northern Ireland
- Population: 2,836 (2011)
- Irish grid reference: H930278
- District: Newry, Mourne and Down
- County: County Armagh
- Country: Northern Ireland
- Sovereign state: United Kingdom
- Post town: NEWRY
- Postcode district: BT35
- Dialling code: 028
- UK Parliament: Newry & Armagh
- NI Assembly: Newry & Armagh

Newtownhamilton (Irish: An Baile Úr, meaning 'the New Town') is a small village and civil parish in County Armagh, Northern Ireland. 10 miles (16 km) west of Newry, it lies predominantly within Tullyvallan townland in the area known as South Armagh.

It is within the Newry, Mourne and Down local government district, and the civil parish is within the historic barony of Fews Upper. In the 2011 census it had 2,836 inhabitants.

The village is built around two narrow main streets (Armagh Street and Dundalk Street) and a main town square (The Square). Other places include Newry Street, Castleblaney Street (known locally as 'Blaney Hill'), Shambles Lane and The Commons. Residential areas include Dungormley Estate, Meadowvale and the Nine Mile Road.

== Name ==
Before the Plantation of Ulster the area of Newtownhamilton was known as Tullyvallan. This comes from the Irish Tulaigh Uí Mhealláin meaning "Ó Mealláin's hillock".

The modern Irish name of Newtownhamilton is An Baile Úr, meaning "the new town"; a rarely used alternative is Baile Úr Uí Urmoltaigh ("the new town of Hamilton").

== History ==
On 9 May 1920, during the Irish War of Independence, some 200 Irish Republican Army (IRA) volunteers under Frank Aiken surrounded and attacked the Royal Irish Constabulary (RIC) barracks in Newtownhamilton. After a two-hour firefight, the IRA breached the barracks wall with explosives and stormed the building. The RIC refused to surrender, even though the building was set alight with petrol from a potato-spraying machine. The 200-400 IRA men left the town at daybreak, discouraged and very drunk from the public house they had broken into beside the barracks, and had demolished the walk between the pub and the barracks. They left the RIC garrison still shouting 'No Surrender' and with the officers safe. One officer's wife and children had been hiding the whole time, with the mother helping to load the magazines for the constabulary.

Newtownhamilton suffered significant disruption, damage and fatalities during The Troubles from the late 1960s to the 1990s. The deadliest incident was the Tullyvallen massacre. For more information, see The Troubles in Newtownhamilton. While the British Army had a major presence in the village during the conflict, this was scaled down and eventually removed entirely following the Good Friday Agreement. In 2006 it was announced that the local police station would be upgraded to full-time status due to a recent bomb explosion caused by a still-active nationalist group.

== Demography ==
=== 2011 census ===
Newtownhamilton is classified as a small town. On census day in 2011 (27 March 2011), in Newtownhamilton Ward, there were 2,836 people living in 956 households, giving an average household size of 2.97.

- 26.09% were aged under 16 years and 10.93% were aged 65 and over;
- 50.74% of the usually resident population were male and 49.26% were female; and
- 32 years was the average (median) age of the population.
- 99.44% were from white (including Irish Traveller) ethnic groups;
- 62.41% belong to or were brought up in the Catholic religion and 34.77% belong to or were brought up in a 'Protestant and Other Christian (including Christian related)' religion; and
- 30.18% indicated that they had a British national identity, 44.39% had an Irish national identity and 27.82% had a Northern Irish national identity. Respondents could indicate more than one national identity

Of the population aged 3 years old and over:

- 14.99% had some knowledge of Irish;
- 4.71% had some knowledge of Ulster-Scots; and
- 2.63% did not have English as their first language.

=== 2001 census ===
On census day 29 April 2001, there were 648 people living in Newtownhamilton.

== Civil parish of Newtownhamilton ==
The civil parish contains the village of Newtownhamilton. The civil parish also contains the following townlands:

- Altnamackan
- Ballynarea
- Camly (Ball)
- Camly (Macullagh)
- Carrickacullion
- Carrickrovaddy (also known as Dorsy (Macdonald))
- Dorsy (Hearty)
- Dorsy (Macdonald) (also known as Carrickrovaddy)
- Dorsy (Mullaghglass)
- Drumaltnamuck
- Kiltybane (also known as Lisleitrim)
- Lisleitrim (also known as Kiltybane)
- Mullaghduff
- Roxborough
- Skerriff (Tichburn)
- Skerriff (Trueman)
- Tullyogallaghan
- Tullyvallan
- Tullyvallan (Hamilton) East
- Tullyvallan (Hamilton) West
- Tullyvallan (Macullagh)
- Tullyvallan (Tipping) East
- Tullyvallan (Tipping) West
- Ummerinvore

== See also ==
- List of towns and villages in Northern Ireland
- List of civil parishes of County Armagh
