= Mountainview Tavern attack =

1975 attack on Mountview Tavern by Irish republicans

- Part of The Troubles
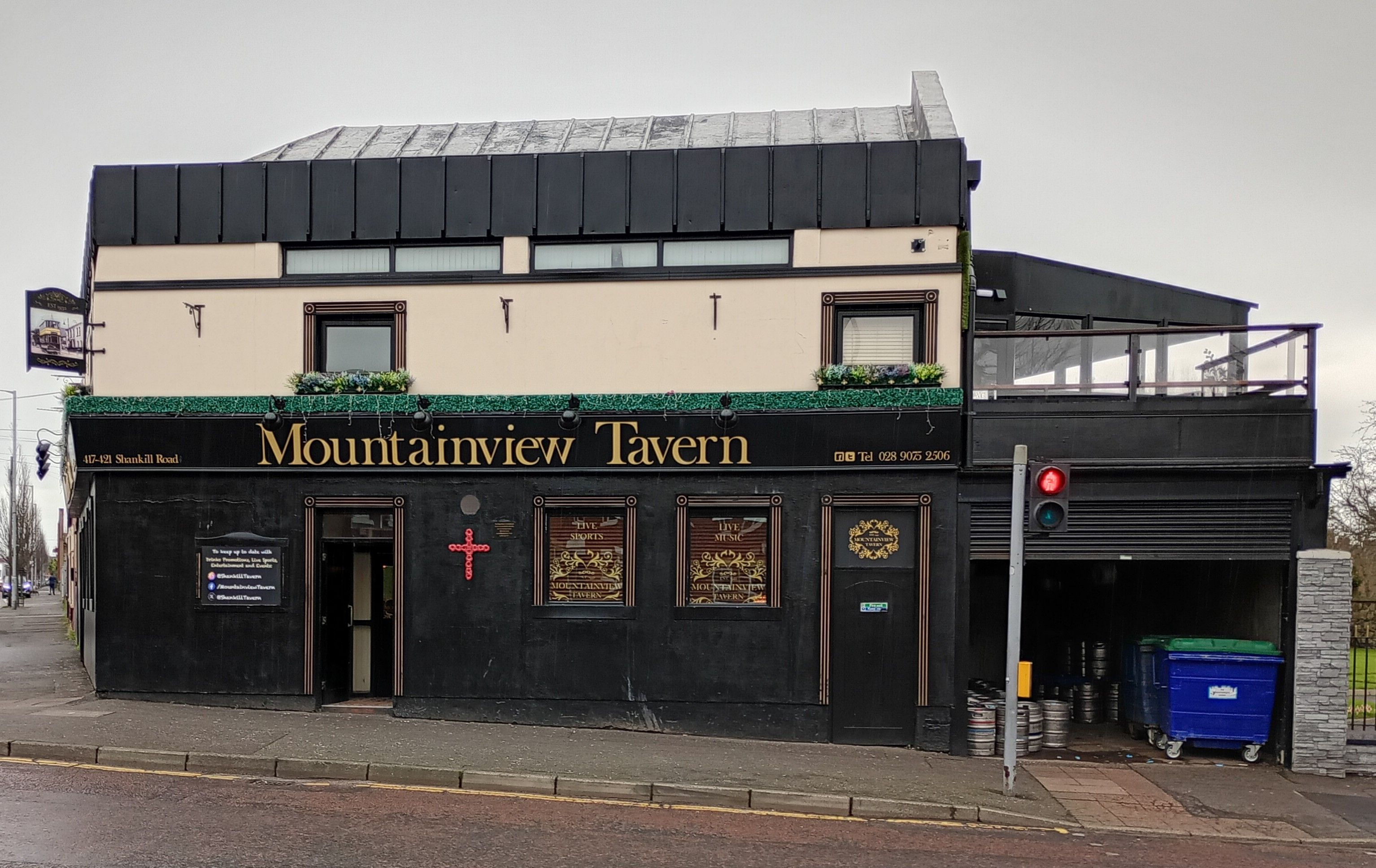
- The Mountainview Tavern in 2026
- Location: 54°36′14″N 5°56′53″W; Mountainview Tavern; Shankill Road, Belfast, Northern Ireland
- Date: 5 April 1975; 18:00 GMT
- Attack type: Shooting, bombing
- Weapons: Hand guns Time bomb
- Deaths: 5 (4 Protestant civilians, 1 UDA member)
- Injuries: 60
- Perpetrator: Provisional IRA Belfast Brigade Claimed by Republican Action Force

On 5 April 1975 Irish republican paramilitary members killed a UDA volunteer and four Protestant civilians in a gun and bomb attack at the Mountainview Tavern on the Shankill Road, Belfast. The attack was claimed by the Republican Action Force believed to be a covername used by Provisional IRA (IRA) volunteers.

== Background and events leading up to the attack ==
By 1975, the ethno-nationalist conflict in Northern Ireland known as the Troubles was more than six years old. On 10 February 1975, the Provisional IRA and British government entered into a truce and restarted negotiations. The IRA agreed to halt attacks on the British security forces, and the security forces mostly ended its raids and searches. However, there were dissenters on both sides. Some Provisionals wanted no part of the truce, while British commanders resented being told to stop their operations against the IRA just when—they claimed—they had the Provisionals on the run. The security forces boosted their intelligence offensive during the truce and thoroughly infiltrated the IRA.

There was a rise in sectarian killings during the truce, which 'officially' lasted until early 1976. Ulster loyalists, fearing they were about to be forsaken by the British government and forced into a united Ireland, increased their attacks on the Irish Catholic and nationalist community. They hoped to force the IRA to retaliate and thus hasten an end to the truce. Under orders not to engage the security forces, some IRA units concentrated on tackling the loyalists. The fall-off of regular operations had caused serious problems of internal discipline and some IRA members, with or without permission from higher up the command chain, engaged in tit-for-tat killings.

The Mountainview Tavern had been attacked before when, on the night of 23 May 1971 the IRA bombed the building with 18-20 lbs of high explosives, the blast injured 18 people.

== The attack ==
The attack was carried out by a three-man active service unit. At around 6.00pm two members of the unit opened fire in the bar with handguns before the third member of the unit ran in with the bomb, placed it where it would do most damage near the doorway, lit the fuse and then the unit ran out of the pub and drove away. The force of the explosion was massive and brought the roof crashing in on the customers. The bar was packed with people waiting to watch the Grand National horse race when the attack happened.

== See also ==
- Miami Showband killings
- Bayardo Bar attack
- Kingsmill massacre
- Hillcrest Bar bombing
- Shankill road bombing

== Sources ==
- CAIN project
