= Tullyvallen massacre =

Mass shooting near Tullyvallen, Northern Ireland

- Part of the Troubles
- Location: 54°10′22″N 6°36′53″W; Tullyvallen, Newtownhamilton, County Armagh, Northern Ireland
- Date: 1 September 1975; 22:00 GMT
- Attack type: Mass shooting
- Weapons: Assault rifles, time bomb
- Deaths: 5
- Injuries: 7
- Perpetrator: Republican Action Force

The Tullyvallen massacre took place on 1 September 1975, when Irish republican gunmen attacked an Orange Order meeting hall at Tullyvallen, near Newtownhamilton in County Armagh, Northern Ireland. The Orange Order is an Ulster Protestant and unionist brotherhood. Five Orangemen were killed and seven wounded in the shooting. A group using the name "South Armagh Republican Action Force" claimed responsibility, saying the attack was retaliation for a series of killings of Catholic civilians by Loyalists. It is believed that members of the Provisional IRA carried out the attack, despite the organisation being on ceasefire.

== Background ==
On 10 February 1975, the Provisional IRA and British government entered into a truce and restarted negotiations. The IRA agreed to halt attacks on the security forces, and the security forces mostly ended their raids and searches. Sectarian killings rose during the truce. Loyalists, fearing they were about to be abandoned by the British government and forced into a united Ireland, increased attacks on Irish Catholics/nationalists. They hoped to provoke IRA retaliation and thereby end the truce. Some IRA units focused on countering loyalist activity. The fall‑off in regular operations led to indiscipline within the IRA, and some members, with or without authorisation, engaged in tit‑for‑tat killings.

On 22 August, loyalists killed three Catholic civilians in a gun and bomb attack on a pub in Armagh. Two days later, loyalists shot dead two Catholic civilians after stopping their car at a fake British Army checkpoint in the Tullyvallen area. Both attacks have been linked to the Glenanne gang. On 30 August, loyalists killed two more Catholic civilians in a gun and bomb attack on a pub in Belfast.

== Orange Hall attack ==
On the night of 1 September, a group of Orangemen were holding a meeting in their isolated hall in the rural Tullyvallen area. At about 10 pm, two masked gunmen entered the building with assault rifles and opened fire, while others stood outside and fired through the windows. The Orangemen scrambled for cover. One was an off-duty Royal Ulster Constabulary (RUC) officer, who returned fire with a pistol and believed he hit one of the attackers. Five Orangemen, all Protestants, were killed and seven wounded. Before leaving, the attackers planted a 2-pound bomb outside the hall, but it failed to detonate.

The victims were John Johnston (80), James McKee (73) and his son Ronnie McKee (40), Nevin McConnell (48), and William Herron (68) who died two days later. All belonged to Tullyvallen Guiding Star Temperance Orange Lodge. Three of the dead were former members of the Ulster Special Constabulary.

== Aftermath ==
A caller to the BBC claimed responsibility on behalf of the "South Armagh Republican Action Force" or "South Armagh Reaction Force", saying the attack was retaliation for "the assassinations of fellow Catholics". The Irish Times reported on 10 September that "The Provisional IRA has told the British government that dissident members of its organisation were responsible" and "stressed that the shooting did not have the consent of the organisation's leadership".

In response, the Orange Order called for the creation of a legal militia or "Home Guard" to counter republican paramilitaries. The attack also triggered a sudden expansion of loyalist paramilitary activity in Scotland, whose supporters were important suppliers of weapons and funds.

Some of the rifles used in the attack were later used in the Kingsmill massacre in January 1976, when ten Protestant workmen were killed. As with Tullyvallen, the Kingsmill attack was claimed by the "South Armagh Reaction Force", a cover name used by IRA operatives in some operations at the time, as retaliation for killings of Catholics elsewhere.

In November 1977, 22-year-old Cullyhanna man John Anthony McCooey was convicted of driving the gunmen to and from the scene and of IRA membership. He was also convicted of involvement in the killings of UDR soldier Joseph McCullough—chaplain of Tullyvallen Orange lodge—in February 1976, and UDR soldier Robert McConnell in April 1976.

== See also ==
- Darkley killings
