= Historical Enquiries Team =

Sub-unit of the Police Service of Northern Ireland

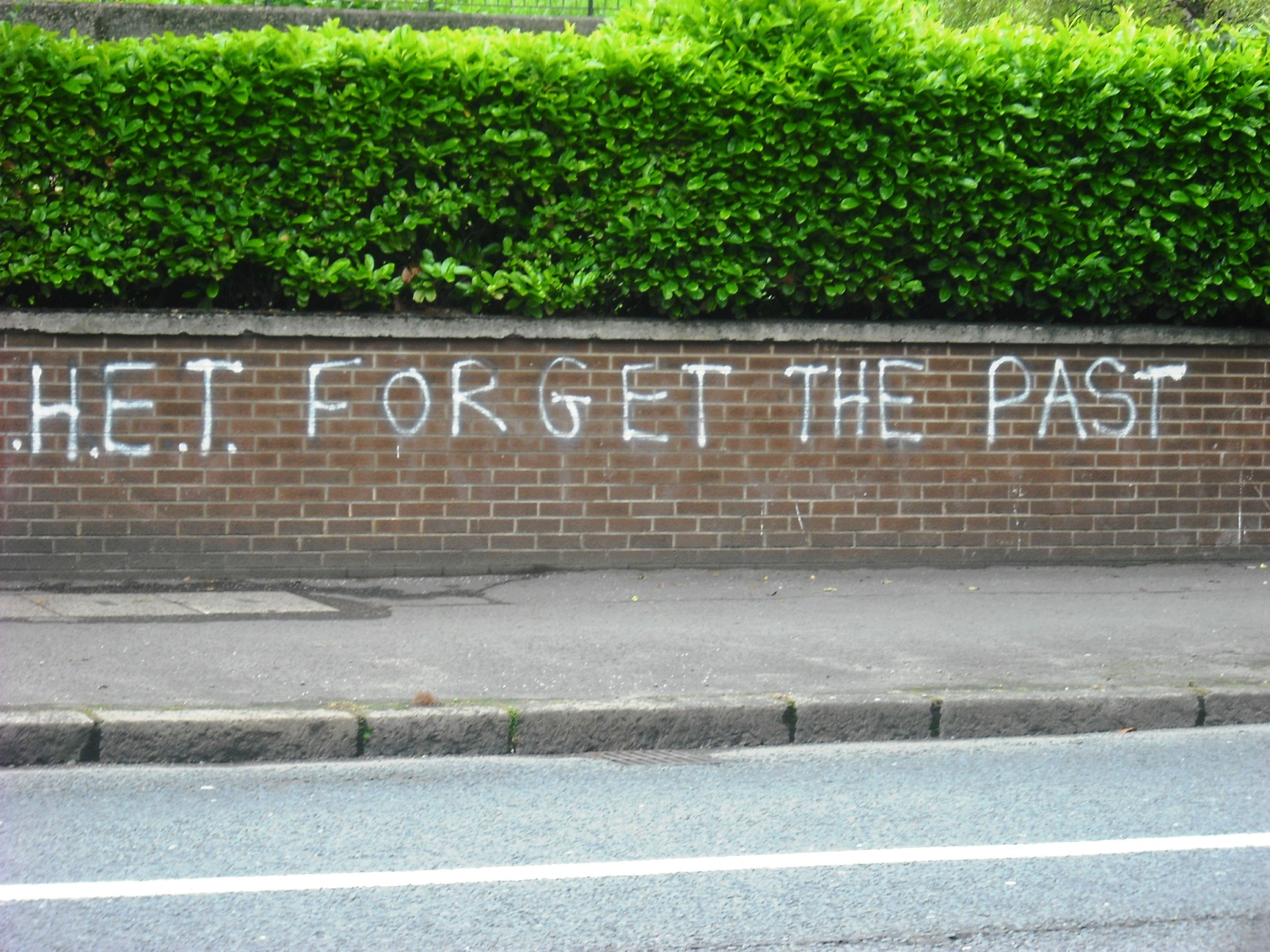
Graffiti against the work of the Historical Enquiries Team, Mount Vernon estate, Belfast

The Historical Enquiries Team was a unit of the Police Service of Northern Ireland (PSNI) set up in September 2005 to investigate the 3,269 unsolved murders committed during the Troubles, specifically between 1968 and 1998. It was wound up in September 2014, when the PSNI restructured following budget cuts.

== Goals ==
The team had three objectives:

- To work with families of those who had been killed.
- To ensure that cases were conducted to modern policing standards, and
- To carry out the work in such a way that the wider community had confidence in the outcomes.

Working with families was at the heart of the HET objectives, with a family liaison process in place, and the HET undertaking to provide each affected family with a copy of the relevant report.

It was headed by Commander David Cox, formerly of the London Metropolitan Police, and consisted of a team of 100 investigators and supporting staff, and a budget of £30 million.

HET was split into two distinct teams: Review and Investigation. The Review team was staffed by police officers employed and seconded from outside Northern Ireland, while the Investigation team was recruited locally.

The team aimed to fulfil its mandate by 2011. However, the investigators – along with the Police Ombudsman – agreed that they would require further time to work through the outstanding cases. Cases were generally handled in chronological order. At that time, under an agreement between the British Army and the Royal Ulster Constabulary (RUC), military witnesses to deaths were often initially interviewed by the Royal Military Police instead of the RUC. Doubts had since been raised about the independence and effectiveness of these investigations.

Major reforms to the structure and resourcing of PSNI announced in September 2014 meant the closure of the Historical Enquiries Team, to be replaced by 'a much smaller unit' within PSNI.

== Findings ==
The HET has investigated several of the most controversial killings during the Troubles, including the killing of Terry Herdman (17) in 1973, who had friends in the IRA and was accused of being an informer. He was hence killed by the IRA as they regarded him as a "liability"; the HET reported that Herdman did not knowingly betray IRA secrets to the Army or the police.

The Historical Enquiries Team (HET) report on the 1975 Miami Showband killings, an ambush on civilians travelling in a minibus, confirmed Mid-Ulster UVF leader Robin "Jackal" Jackson's involvement and identified him as an RUC Special Branch agent. The HET said the killings raised "disturbing questions about collusive and corrupt behaviour" between loyalist paramilitaries and British state forces.

The HET report on the 1976 Kingsmill massacre, an ambush on civilians travelling in a minibus, stated that the organization that carried out the act, the South Armagh Republican Action Force (SARAF), included members of the Provisional IRA despite that organization being on a ceasefire. The HET report said that the 10 all male victims of the massacre, 4 of whom belonged to the Orange Order, were targeted because they were from the Protestant community, and that their murder was a sectarian response to the shooting of 7 Catholics in the Reavey and O'Dowd killings that occurred the night before but that it was planned before that event. This is in line with the contemporary statement issued by the spokesman for SARAF. In April 2024, the coroner delivered findings at the Kingsmill inquest describing the killings as a sectarian terrorist atrocity carried out by the IRA. In April 2025, the Police Ombudsman published a separate report identifying serious failings in the original RUC investigation, including failures to arrest and interview eleven men identified through intelligence and to pursue available ballistic and forensic evidence. The Ombudsman attributed these failings in part to insufficient investigative resources. The report did not identify intelligence that could have enabled police to prevent the attack.

In the fatal shooting of Aidan McAnespie on 21 February 1988, the British Army soldier claimed that his hands were wet, causing him to inadvertently fire his machine gun when he was moving inside a sanger. The report called this the "least likely version" of what happened.

Damien Walsh (17) was murdered while working at a coal supply business in Twinbrook in 1993. The HET reported that undercover British soldiers were watching as UFF loyalists murdered the Catholic teenager but were too far away to intervene.

William McGreanery (41) was shot by a British soldier in Derry in 1971 when he was walking past an observation point. An investigation by the HET into Mr MrGreanery's death found that he was not carrying a firearm and he posed no threat to the soldiers, despite earlier claims that he was.

Majella O'Hare from Whitecross was on her way to confession on August 14, 1976, when she was hit in the back by a bullet. A HET report backed an earlier RUC investigation which found that the British soldier who shot her was not returning fire, as he had claimed.

A HET report into the loyalist murders of three brothers from south Armagh in 1976 exonerated them and their family of any links to paramilitarism. The brothers — John Martin, Brian and Anthony Reavey who were all Catholic — were shot dead by six masked men who burst into their home in Whitecross in January 1976.

In the Sean Graham bookmakers' shooting, five Catholic civilians were killed in a mass shooting perpetrated by the UDA, who opened fire on the bookmakers' shop on Ormeau Road in 1992. The HET report confirmed one of the guns used by the UDA gang had previously been returned to them by RUC officers.

== Inspectorate of Constabulary report ==
A 2013 report into the HET by the UK's Her Majesty's Inspectorate of Constabulary found that the HET was not reviewing all of the historical cases within its remit in a consistent manner, and that some cases involving deaths caused by members of the police and military (which the report called 'state involvement cases') were 'being reviewed with less rigour in some areas' than non-state cases.
