= South Armagh Republican Action Force =

Irish republican paramilitary group

The South Armagh Republican Action Force (SARAF) shortened simply to the Republican Action Force (RAF) for a small number of attacks in Belfast was an Irish republican paramilitary group that was active from September 1975 to April 1977 during the Troubles in Northern Ireland. Its area of activity was mainly the southern part of County Armagh. According to writers such as Ed Moloney and Richard English, it was a cover name used by some members of the Provisional IRA South Armagh Brigade. The journalist Jack Holland, alleged that members of the Irish National Liberation Army (INLA) were also involved in the group. During the same time that the South Armagh Republican Action Force was active the INLA carried out at least one sectarian attack that killed Protestant civilians using the covername "Armagh People's Republican Army". According to Malcolm Sutton's database at CAIN, the South Armagh Republican Action Force was responsible for 24 deaths during the conflict, all of whom were classified as civilians.

== Background ==
On 10 February 1975, the Provisional IRA and British government entered into a truce and restarted negotiations. The IRA agreed to halt attacks on British security forces, and the security forces mostly ended its raids and searches. However, there were dissenters on both sides. Some Provisionals wanted no part of the truce, while British commanders resented being told to stop their operations against the IRA just when—they claimed—they had the Provisionals on the run. The security forces boosted their intelligence offensive during the truce and thoroughly infiltrated the IRA.

There was a rise in sectarian killings during the truce, which 'officially' lasted until early 1976. Loyalist paramilitaries, fearing they were about to be forsaken by the British government and forced into a united Ireland, increased their attacks on Catholics. Loyalists killed 120 Catholics in 1975, the vast majority civilians. They hoped to force the IRA to retaliate and thus hasten an end to the truce. Under orders not to engage the security forces, some IRA units concentrated on tackling the loyalists. The fall-off of regular operations had caused serious problems of internal discipline and some IRA members, with or without permission from higher up, engaged in tit-for-tat killings. INLA members, and current or former members of the Official IRA, were also allegedly involved.

== Tullyvallen attack ==
Tullyvallen Orange Hall in 2009

On 1 September 1975, a few days after two Catholic civilians were shot dead a short distance way in Altnamackan, the South Armagh Republican Action Force claimed responsibility for a gun attack on Tullyvallen Orange Hall near Newtownhamilton, County Armagh. The attack happened at about 10 pm, when a group of Orangemen were holding a meeting inside. A number of the Orangemen were members of the Royal Ulster Constabulary and British Army and were armed. Two gunmen entered the hall and sprayed it with bullets while another stood outside and shot through a window. One of the Orangemen was an off-duty Royal Ulster Constabulary (RUC) officer. He returned fire with a pistol and believed he hit one of the attackers. Five of the Orangemen, all civilians, were killed while seven others were wounded. The attackers planted a 2 pounds (0.91 kg) bomb outside the hall but it failed to detonate. A caller to the BBC claimed responsibility for the attack and said it was in retaliation for "the assassinations of fellow Catholics in Belfast". Shortly after, the Orange Order called for the creation of a legal militia (or "Home Guard") to deal with republican paramilitaries.

== Kingsmill attack ==
On 5 January 1976, the Force claimed responsibility for the Kingsmill massacre. In that attack, its members stopped a minibus near Kingsmill in County Armagh and shot 11 Protestant men who were travelling in it. 10 men died; one survived despite being shot 18 times. Four of the dead belonged to the Orange Order. Up to eleven gunmen reportedly took part in the massacre and were led by a man "with a pronounced English accent". The group's spokesman stated that the attack was in retaliation for the killing of six Catholics the night before and that there would be "no further action on our part" if loyalists stopped their attacks. He also claimed the group had no connection with the PIRA.

In contrast, a 2011 Historical Enquiries Team investigation into the incident determined that Provisional IRA volunteers were responsible for the attack despite the organisation being on an official ceasefire, and found that the victims had been targeted because of their religion.

== List of attacks claimed by the SARAF/RAF ==
At least 26 known people were killed by the SARAF/RAF between 1975 and 1977.

1975

- 1 September: Five Protestant civilians died and seven were injured as a result of an attack on an Orange Hall in Newtownhamilton, County Armagh. Responsibility for the attack was claimed by the South Armagh Republican Action Force.

1976

- 5 January: Ten Protestant civilians were killed by the Republican Action Force (RAF), in an attack on their minibus at Kingsmills, near Bessbrook, County Armagh. The men were returning from work when their minibus was stopped by a bogus security checkpoint.
- 17 May: The Republican Action Force claimed responsibility for shooting dead two Protestant civilians in Moy, County Tyrone. They claimed the attack was in response to a Loyalist bombing in a pub named Clancey's Bar in Charlemont in Armagh which killed three Catholic civilians.
- 25 June: Three Protestant civilians were shot dead during a gun attack on Walker's Bar, Lyle Hill Road, Templepatrick, County Antrim. The attack was carried out by a group called the Republican Action Force (RAF), believed to be a cover name for some members of the Irish Republican Army (IRA).
- 30 July: Four Protestant civilians died as a result of a gun attack on the Stag Inn, Belvoir, Belfast. The attack was carried out by the Republican Action Force.

1977

- 2 April: Protestant civilian Hughe Clarke was found shot dead in Tullymacreeve near Forkill, County Armagh. The Republican Action Force (RAF) claimed responsibility.
- 21 April: Protestant civilian Brian Smith (24) was found shot dead at the corner of Snugville Street and Queensland Street, Shankill, Belfast
