= Loughinisland massacre =

1994 mass shooting in Loughinisland, Northern Ireland

- Part of the Troubles
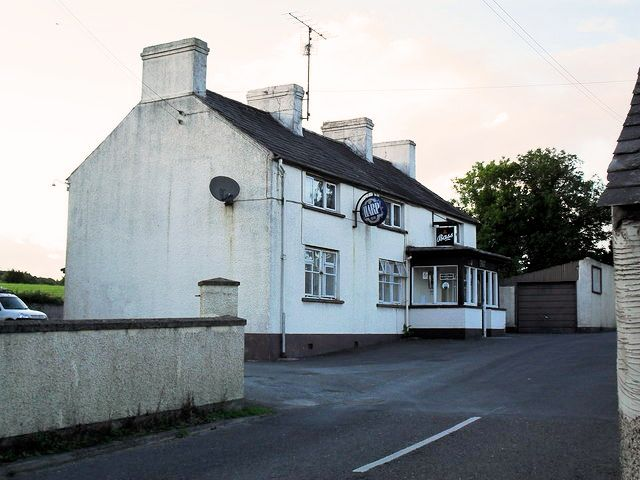
- O'Toole's Pub in 2009

- Location of where massacre took place.
- Location: O'Toole's Pub, Loughinisland, County Down, Northern Ireland
- Date: 18 June 1994; 32 years ago 10:10 p.m. (BST)
- Attack type: Mass shooting
- Weapon: Vz. 58 assault rifles
- Deaths: 6 civilians
- Injuries: 5 civilians
- Perpetrator: Ulster Volunteer Force

The Loughinisland massacre took place on 18 June 1994 in the village of Loughinisland, County Down, Northern Ireland. Members of the Ulster Volunteer Force (UVF), a loyalist paramilitary group, burst into a pub with assault rifles and fired on the customers, killing six civilians and wounding five. The pub was targeted because it was frequented mainly by Catholics, and was crowded with people watching the Republic of Ireland play against Italy in the 1994 FIFA World Cup. It is thus sometimes called the "World Cup massacre". The UVF claimed the attack was retaliation for the killing of three UVF members by the Irish National Liberation Army (INLA) two days before.

There have been allegations that police (Royal Ulster Constabulary) double agents or informers in the UVF were linked to the massacre and that police protected those informers by destroying evidence and failing to carry out a proper investigation. At the request of the victims' families, the Police Ombudsman investigated the police. In 2011 the Ombudsman concluded that there were major failings in the police investigation, but no evidence that police colluded with the UVF. The Ombudsman did not investigate the role of informers and the report was branded a whitewash. The Ombudsman's own investigators demanded to be disassociated from it. The report was quashed, the Ombudsman replaced and a new inquiry was ordered.

In 2016, a new Ombudsman report concluded that there had been collusion between the police and the UVF, and that the investigation was undermined by the wish to protect informers, but found no evidence police had foreknowledge of the attack. Two documentary films about the massacre, Ceasefire Massacre and No Stone Unturned, were released in 2014 and 2017 respectively. The latter named the main suspects, one of whom was a serving member of the British Army, and claimed that one of the suspects was an informer.

== Background ==
The UVF emerged in the late 1960s, at the beginning of the thirty-year conflict known as the Troubles. The UVF's claimed goal was to fight Irish republicanism – particularly the Irish Republican Army (IRA) – and maintain Northern Ireland's status as part of the United Kingdom. Most of its victims were innocent Catholic civilians, who were often killed at random. Whenever it claimed responsibility for attacks, the UVF usually claimed that those targeted were IRA members or were helping the IRA. Other times, attacks on Catholic civilians were claimed as "retaliation" for IRA actions, since the IRA drew almost all of its support from the Catholic population.

Since the 1970s, the UVF had carried out many gun and bomb attacks on Catholic-owned pubs and there had been many incidents of collusion between the UVF and members of the state security forces. During the early 1990s, loyalists drastically increased their attacks on Catholics and Irish nationalists and – for the first time since the conflict began – were responsible for more deaths than republicans or the security forces.

On 16 June 1994, the Irish National Liberation Army (INLA) killed three UVF members – Trevor King, Colin Craig and David Hamilton – in a drive-by shooting on the Shankill Road in Belfast. Senior UVF members had been meeting in a building nearby. According to one senior member, after this attack the UVF called on its members to retaliate, for there to be "blood on the streets" and to "kill any Catholic" they could. The following day, the UVF launched two "retaliatory" attacks. In the first, UVF members shot dead a Catholic civilian taxi driver in Carrickfergus. In the second, they shot dead two Protestant civilians in Newtownabbey, whom they believed were Catholics. The Loughinisland shootings, a day later, are believed to have been further retaliation.

== Pub attack ==
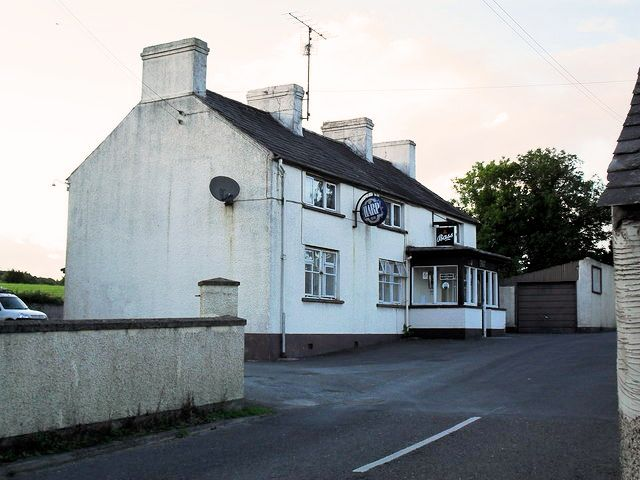
The pub in 2009

On the evening of 18 June 1994, about 24 people were gathered in The Heights Bar (also known as O'Toole's Pub) watching the Republic of Ireland vs Italy in the FIFA World Cup.

At 10:10 p.m., two UVF members wearing boiler suits and balaclavas walked into the bar. One shouted "Fenian bastards!" and opened fire on the crowd with a vz. 58 assault rifle, spraying the small room with more than sixty bullets. Six men were killed outright, and five other people were wounded. Witnesses said the gunmen then ran to a getaway car, "laughing". One described "bodies … lying piled on top of each other on the floor". The dead were Adrian Rogan (34), Malcolm Jenkinson (52), Barney Green (87), Daniel McCreanor (59), Patrick O'Hare (35) and Eamon Byrne (39), all Catholic civilians. O'Hare was the brother-in-law of Eamon Byrne and Green was one of the oldest people to be killed during the Troubles.

The UVF claimed responsibility within hours of the attack. It claimed that an Irish republican meeting was being held in the pub and that the shooting was retaliation for the INLA attack. Police said there is no evidence the pub had links to republican paramilitary activity, and said the attack was purely sectarian. Journalist Peter Taylor wrote in his book Loyalists that the attack may not have been sanctioned by the UVF leadership. Police intelligence indicates that the order to retaliate came from the UVF leadership and that its 'Military Commander' had supplied the rifle used. Police believe the attack was carried out by a local UVF unit under the command of a senior member who reported to the leadership in Belfast.

The attack received international media coverage and was widely condemned. Among those who sent messages of sympathy were Pope John Paul II, Queen Elizabeth II and US President Bill Clinton. Local Protestant families visited their wounded neighbours in the hospital, expressing their shock and disgust.

== Aftermath ==
The massacre ultimately led to a temporary return to tit-for-tat violence. The following month, the IRA shot dead three high-ranking members of the Ulster Defence Association (UDA), the other main loyalist paramilitary group alongside the UVF. It is claimed this was retaliation for the Loughinisland massacre. The IRA stated that the men were directing the UDA's campaign of violence against Catholics.

On 11 July, the IRA shot dead Ray Smallwoods, a member of the UDA's Inner Council and spokesman for its political wing, the Ulster Democratic Party. Six days later, UDA gunmen tried to repeat the Loughinisland massacre when they attacked the Hawthorn Inn in nearby Annaclone. About 40 people were inside watching the football World Cup final. The pub's thick doors had been locked and so the gunmen instead fired through the windows, wounding seven people. On 31 July, the IRA shot dead UDA commander Joe Bratty and his right-hand man Raymond Elder.

== Investigation and campaign by victims' families ==
The morning after the attack, the getaway car — a red Triumph Acclaim — was found abandoned in a field near Crossgar. On 4 August, the assault rifle used in the attack was found hidden at a bridge near Saintfield along with a holdall containing boiler suits, balaclavas, gloves, three handguns and ammunition.

The first arrests were made on 18 July 1994, a month after the attack, when six men were arrested as suspects under the terrorism laws. Two of them were re-arrested on 22 August, along with a further suspect. All were released without charge for lack of evidence.

In 2006, following claims that "an RUC agent" had supplied the getaway car to the gunmen, the victims' families lodged an official complaint about the investigation with the Police Ombudsman. The complaint included allegations "that the investigation had not been efficiently or properly carried out; no earnest effort was made to identify those responsible; and there were suspicions of state collusion in the murders". It was alleged that police agents or informers within the UVF were linked to the attack, and that the police's investigation was hindered by its desire to protect those informers. The victims' families also alleged that the police had failed to keep in contact with them about the investigation, even about significant developments.

It was revealed that the police had destroyed key evidence and documents. The car had been disposed of in April 1995, ten months into the investigation. In 1998, police documents related to the investigation were destroyed at Gough Barracks RUC station, allegedly because of fears they were contaminated by asbestos. It is believed they included the original notes, made during interviews of suspects in 1994 and 1995. A hair follicle had been recovered from the car but nobody had yet been charged, while the other items (balaclavas, gloves, etc.) had not been subjected to new tests made possible by advances in forensic science. It was alleged that the rifle used in the attack had been part of a shipment smuggled into Northern Ireland for loyalists by British agent Brian Nelson.

A key eyewitness claimed she gave police a description of the getaway driver within hours of the massacre, but that police failed to record important information she gave them and never asked her to identify suspects. A serving policeman later gave the woman's personal details to a relative of the suspected getaway driver. Police then visited her and advised her to increase her security for fear she could be shot.

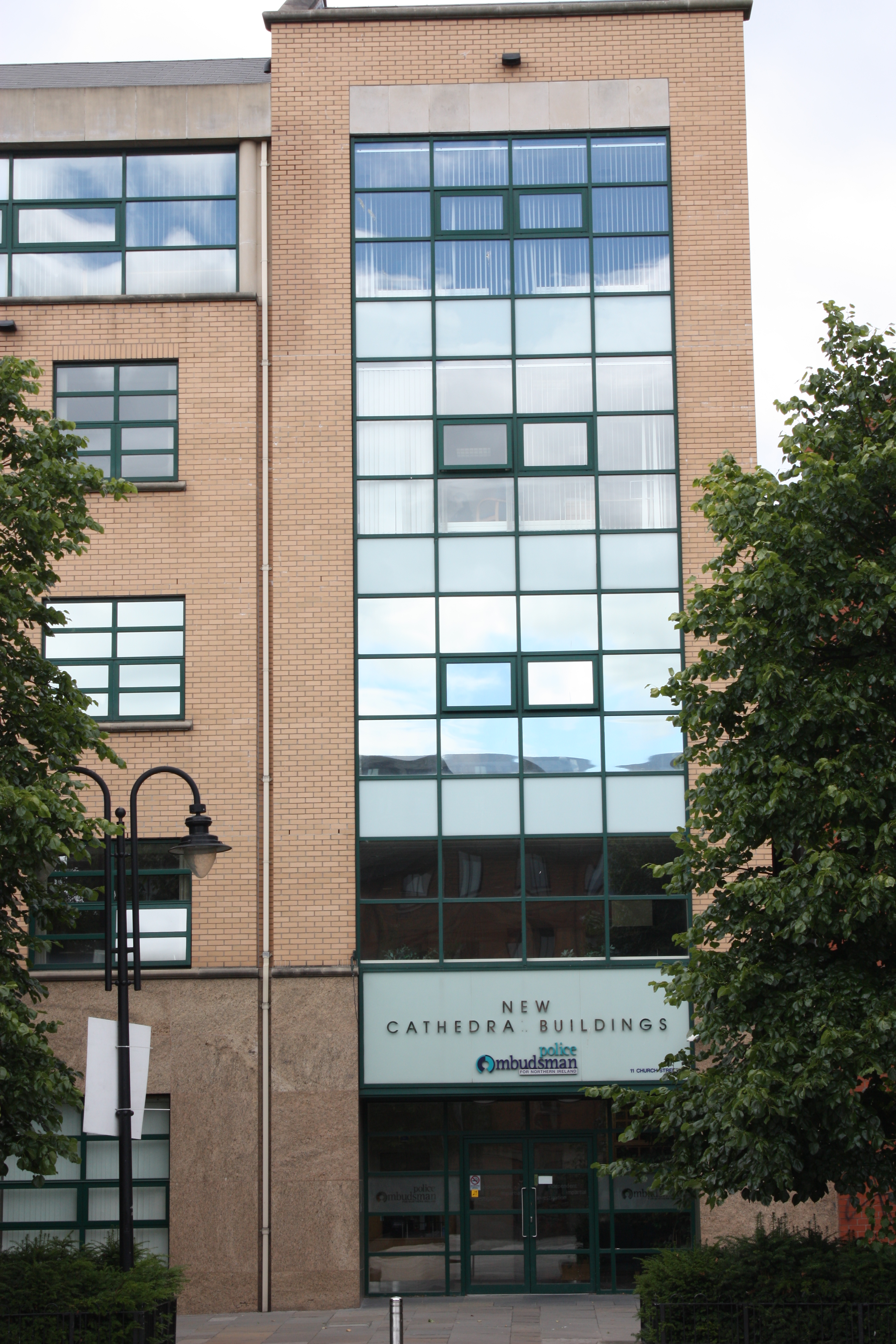
The Office of the Police Ombudsman, which investigated the police over the massacre

In 2008 it was revealed that, since the shootings, up to 20 people had been arrested for questioning but none had ever been charged. In January 2010 a reserve Police Service of Northern Ireland (PSNI) officer (formerly an RUC officer) was arrested by detectives from the Police Ombudsman's Office and questioned over "perverting the course of justice" and "aiding the killers' escape". Later that year, the Public Prosecution Service (PPS) concluded there wasn't enough evidence to prosecute. In reply, the Ombudsman's Office said it would consider disciplinary action against the officer.

=== First Police Ombudsman's report ===
In September 2009 it was revealed that a Police Ombudsman's report on the killings was to be published on 15 September. At the same time, some details of the report were made known. Police sources said the report would expose the role of four RUC informers in "ordering or organising" the attack. The report was also said to highlight a series of major failings in the police investigation. Shortly after these revelations, the Ombudsman postponed publication of the report as "new evidence" had emerged.

The Ombudsman's report was finally published on 24 June 2011. It said that the police investigation had lacked "diligence, focus and leadership"; that there were failings in record management; that significant lines of enquiry were not identified; and that police failed to communicate effectively with the victims' families. It said that there was "insufficient evidence of collusion" and "no evidence that police could have prevented the attack". The report was harshly criticised for not investigating the role of RUC informers inside the UVF. Social Democratic and Labour Party leader Margaret Ritchie said the findings were flawed and contrary "to a mountain of evidence of collusion". She added: "It completely lets down the victims' families and the wider community. [The Ombudsman] paints a picture of an incompetent keystone cops type of police force when the reality was that the RUC and Special Branch were rotten to the core". Niall Murphy, the solicitor for the victims' relatives, described the report's findings as "timid, mild and meek". He added: "The ombudsman has performed factual gymnastics to ensure there was no evidence of collusion in his conclusion". The relatives stated that they believe the report proves police colluded with those involved and made "no real attempt to catch the killers".

After the report's publication, there were calls for the Ombudsman, Al Hutchinson, to resign, and the victims' families began a High Court challenge to have the report's findings quashed. In September 2011, the Criminal Justice Inspectorate (CJI) criticized Hutchinson and recommended that the Ombudsman's Office be suspended from investigating historic murders because its independence had been compromised. CJI inspectors found "major inconsistencies" in the Ombudsman's report. Ombudsman investigators had demanded to be disassociated from the report because their original findings "were dramatically altered without reason". Ombudsman investigators also believed that key intelligence had been deliberately withheld from them. In 2012, the Belfast High Court quashed the report's findings and Hutchinson was replaced by Michael Maguire, who ordered a new inquiry into the massacre.

Maguire was the head of the Criminal Justice Inspectorate that had led the critical investigation of the first report.

=== Second Police Ombudsman's report ===
A second Police Ombudsman's report was published in June 2016. The Ombudsman, Michael Maguire, stated: "I have no hesitation in unambiguously determining that collusion is a significant feature of the Loughinisland murders". Among the Ombudsman's findings and conclusions were that:

- The rifle used in the attack came from a shipment of weapons smuggled into Northern Ireland by loyalists in 1988. Police were aware of the smuggling operation, as informers were involved in it. Much of the weaponry was seized, but "a significant proportion" was not, "despite a number of indicators as to where those weapons could be found".
- RUC Special Branch identified five suspects to the investigation team the day after the attack. Suspects did not begin to be arrested until one month later. The Ombudsman said these "unexplained delays" meant that "evidential opportunities were probably lost".
- One of the suspects was an informer, and Special Branch did not pass on all relevant intelligence to those investigating the massacre, in order to "protect" its informers within the UVF. The Ombudsman concluded that the wish to protect informers influenced policing activity and undermined the investigation.
- The security forces in the area had been "compromised" by having associations with, and sympathies for, loyalist paramilitaries. UVF members had close relatives who worked at local police stations and within the police force itself. A police officer allegedly warned chief suspects on 21 August 1994 that they would be arrested the next morning. The Ombudsman said it was "inexcusable" that police had not investigated this.

The Republic of Ireland's Foreign Minister called the Ombudsman's findings "deeply disturbing".

=== Documentary ===
In August 2016, it was reported that Oscar-winning film-maker Alex Gibney was making a documentary film about the massacre, called No Stone Unturned. The film's name comes from Claire Rogan's (widow of Aidan Rogan) statement that police had assured the families they would leave "no stone unturned" in the investigation. Their daughter Emma Rogan—later a Member of the Legislative Assembly (MLA) for South Down—said the film would be "a permanent memory to the victims and the injustice done". Gibney had earlier directed a shorter documentary about the massacre, named "Ceasefire Massacre", broadcast on 29 April 2014 by ESPN, as part of their 30 for 30 series. No Stone Unturned was released in November 2017.

The film named the main suspects in the massacre, one of whom had been serving as a soldier in the British Army at the time. It claims that in 1995 the wife of a main suspect anonymously told police he was the gunman, and named the others involved. These anonymous messages were noted in the Police Ombudsman's report. Police allegedly recognized her voice because she had worked in a local police station. She and her husband had been arrested and she admitted making the claims, but they had been released without charge.

The film also claims that one of the killers was an informer, and an ex-police officer told the filmmakers that Special Branch may have had foreknowledge of the attack. According to the officer, Special Branch told him there was an arrest operation ready to catch the UVF unit, after receiving intelligence from an informer. The informer told Special Branch hours before the attack that it had been called off because of problems with the getaway car. The arrest operation was cancelled, but the attack went ahead.

On 31 August 2018, the PSNI arrested Trevor Birney and Barry McCaffrey, two journalists who researched the event, in connection with the theft of material relating to the Ombudsman's investigation, handling stolen goods, and possible breaches of the Official Secrets Act and data protection laws. In December 2024, the Investigatory Powers Tribunal determined PSNI and the Metropolitan police had unlawfully spied on the two journalists, the Met in 2012 and the PSNI in 2013.

In 2020, the High Court in Belfast found the PSNI had wrongfully raided the homes of Birney and McCaffrey.

== Commemoration ==
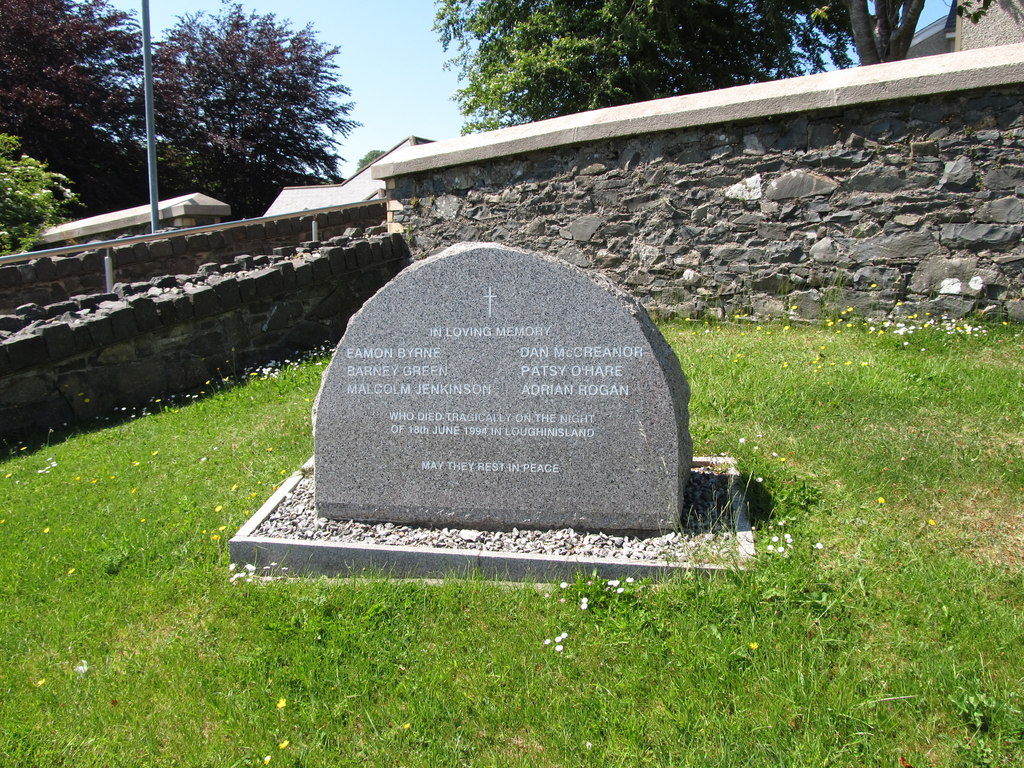
Memorial to the victims.

On 18 June 2012, the 18th anniversary of the attack, the Republic of Ireland football team again played Italy, this time in Euro 2012 at Poznań, Poland. The Irish team wore black armbands during the match to commemorate those killed while watching the same teams playing 18 years before. The idea was proposed by the Football Association of Ireland (FAI) and backed by UEFA. Some prominent loyalists berated the move. South Belfast UDA brigadier Jackie McDonald said that it was "bringing politics into sport" and would lead to "dire repercussions" for football. Another leading loyalist, Winston Churchill Rea, also raised concerns about the tribute. The victims' families supported the gesture.

== See also ==
- A Night in November, a play by Marie Jones, which references the massacre
- Greysteel massacre
- List of massacres in Ireland
- Timeline of Ulster Volunteer Force actions
