= List of terrorist incidents in 1992 =

This is a timeline of incidents in 1992 that have been labelled as "terrorism" and are not believed to have been carried out by a government or its forces (see state terrorism and state-sponsored terrorism).

== Guidelines ==
- To be included, entries must be notable (have a stand-alone article) and described by a consensus of reliable sources as "terrorism".
- List entries must comply with the guidelines outlined in the manual of style under MOS:TERRORIST.
- Casualty figures in this list are the total casualties of the incident including immediate casualties and later casualties (such as people who succumbed to their wounds long after the attacks occurred).
- Casualties listed are the victims. Perpetrator casualties are listed separately (e.g. x (+y) indicate that x victims and y perpetrators were killed/injured).
- Casualty totals may be underestimated or unavailable due to a lack of information. A figure with a plus (+) sign indicates that at least that many people have died (e.g. 10+ indicates that at least 10 people have died) – the actual toll could be considerably higher. A figure with a plus (+) sign may also indicate that over that number of people are victims.
- If casualty figures are 20 or more, they will be shown in **bold**. In addition, figures for casualties more than 50 will also be **underlined**.
- Incidents are limited to one per location per day. If multiple attacks occur in the same place on the same day, they will be merged into a single incident.
- In addition to the guidelines above, the table also includes the following categories:

0 people were killed/injured by the incident.
1–19 people were killed/injured by the incident.
20–49 people were killed/injured by the incident.
50–99 people were killed/injured by the incident.
100+ people were killed/injured by the incident.

== List ==
Date	Type	Dead	Injured	Location	Details	Perpetrator	Part of
January 17	Bombing	8	6	Northern Ireland	A landmine killed eight Protestant men and wounded six others at Teebane Crossroads near Cookstown, County Tyrone. The men had been working for the British Army at a base in Omagh and were returning home on a minibus.	PIRA	The Troubles
January 25	Bombing	0	0	Panama City, Panama	An improvised device was detonated in front of a newspaper offices. The attack no left casualties.	Movimiento 20 de Diciembre (M20)	Terrorism in Panama
February 5	Bombings	3	23	Ürümqi, China	Four bombs targeting public buildings and two buses explode, killing three and injuring 23.	Uyghur nationalists	Xinjiang conflict
February 4	Mass shooting	3	0	Belfast, Northern Ireland	Three Catholic civilians are killed in an attack by a rogue RUC officer on an office of the political wing of the Provisional IRA, Sinn Féin.	Allen Moore	The Troubles
February 5	Mass shooting	5	9	Belfast, Northern Ireland	Five Catholic civilians are killed in a UDA attack on an Irish nationalist shop.	UDA	The Troubles
February 6	Car bombing	5	7	Madrid, Spain	Four military personnel and a civilian employee of the military are killed by an ETA car bomb	ETA	Basque conflict
February 15	Assassination	1	0	Villa El Salvador, Peru	A Sendero Luminoso commando assassinates community leader María Elena Moyano, known as "Madre Coraje".	Sendero Luminoso	Internal conflict in Peru
February 22	Shooting	13	Unknown	Puerto Berrío, Colombia	12 soldiers and 1 civilian are killed in an explosive attack targeting an Army convoy in a semi-rotund spot in the Ité River Canyon, on the border of Remedios and Puerto Berrio (Antioquia).	FARC	Colombian conflict
March 1	Bombing	0	0	Istanbul, Turkey	The Neve Shalom Synagogue is bombed by Hezbollah but no one is hurt. The bombing was the second of three attacks to occur at the synagogue with the others occurring in 1986 and 2003.	Hezbollah	South Lebanon conflict
March 7	Car bombing	1	3	Ankara, Turkey	A booby-trapped car exploded near a market in Ankara, killing Israeli embassy security chief Ehud Sadan and wounding three bystanders.	Islamic Jihad Organization; Islamic Revenge Organization; Hezbollah (suspected)	South Lebanon conflict
March 17	Suicide car bombing	29 (+1 attacker)	242	Buenos Aires, Argentina	An Islamic Jihad suicide bomber rams his car into the Israeli embassy, destroying the embassy and a Catholic church and school that were nearby. Many of the dead were children. Argentina accused Hezbollah of being involved in the attack.	Islamic Jihad; Hezbollah (suspected)	South Lebanon conflict
April 10	Truck bombing	3	91	London, United Kingdom	The Baltic Exchange building is destroyed by a Provisional IRA semtex truck bomb.	PIRA	The Troubles
April 12	Shooting	13	0	Huila Department, Colombia	FARC guerrillas attack the Silvania Inspection and kill 8 soldiers. In response, the Army killed 10 insurgents in Tolima, Magdalena, Cesar and Arauca, while seizing weapons and dynamite in Antioquia and Nariño.	FARC	Colombian conflict
April 28–29	Bombings	1	4	Taipei and Kaohsiung, Taiwan	Seven bombs were discovered at McDonald's restaurants, three of which exploded. One police officer was killed and four civilians were injured. A plumber named Chen Hsi-Hsieh was convicted of the bombings and was found to have been attempting to extort money from McDonald's. His accomplice Pan Che-Ming was also convicted.	Chen Hsi-Hsieh; Pan Che-Ming	
April 29	Massacres	157		Polonnaruwa District, Sri Lanka	A series of massacres occur in several towns. The LTTE, Home Guards and Sri Lankan Police were blamed for the massacres.	LTTE; Home Guards; Sri Lankan Police	Sri Lankan Civil War
May 1	Bombing	1	23	Northern Ireland	The Provisional IRA, using a van modified to run on railway tracks, launched an elaborate bomb attack on a British Army checkpoint in South Armagh. The checkpoint was obliterated. One soldier was killed and 23 wounded.	PIRA	The Troubles
May 24	Melee attack	1		Bat Yam, Israel	A 15-year-old Jewish girl named Helena Rapp is stabbed to death by 18-year-old Islamic Jihad member Fouad Abd El Hani El Omrin.	Palestinian Islamic Jihad	Israeli–Palestinian conflict
May 31	Massacre	5	0	Meta Department, Colombia	Five leaders of the Patriotic Union party were assassinated by paramilitary forces.	Paramilitary	Colombian conflict
June 5	Truck Bombing	3	20	Jesus María District Lima, Peru	A Truck Bomb loaded with half a ton of dynamite, went to the front of a television station and exploded, destroying it.	Shining Path	Internal conflict in Peru
July 16	Truck bombings	25	155	Lima, Peru	Two large truck bombs explode in the wealthy Miraflores District, killing 25, injuring 155 and damaging hundreds of houses and businesses. The communist group Shining Path claimed responsibility.	Shining Path	Internal conflict in Peru
August 8	Land mine	8		Jaffna, Sri Lanka	Eight high ranking Sri Lankan military officers, including Mohan Jayamaha and Denzil Kobbekaduwa are killed by an LTTE land mine.	LTTE	Sri Lankan Civil War
September 1	Bombing	9	7	Medellín, Colombia	Nine die, including a six-month-old baby, and seven are injured when a bomb explodes in a suburb.	Medellín Cartel	Colombian conflict
November 6	Bombing	0	12	Panama City, Panama	A bomb attack caused partial damage to both the prosecutor's car and the building, causing 12 injuries, including the prosecutor and several of his escorts. The perpetrator of the attack was never identified and there was no official adjudication, although the National Security Council of Panama pointed out the main suspect to the Colombian Cartels or a guerrilla group called "Movimiento 20 de Diciembre".	Colombian Mafia/Movimiento 20 de Noviembre	Terrorism in Panama
November 12	Shooting	2 (+12)	1 (+Unknown)	Geneva, Valle del Cauca Department, Colombia	During a failed attack on the town, 12 FARC guerrillas die in combat.	FARC	Colombian conflict
November 15	Massacre	9	0	Medellín, Colombia	At least eight children and one young adult killed by police.	Colombian National Police	Colombian conflict
November 16	Suicide bombing, assassination	4 (+1 attacker)		Colombo, Sri Lanka	Head of the Sri Lankan Navy Clancy Fernando is killed in a suicide bombing along with Lieutenant commander Sandun Gunasekera, his Flag Lieutenant and his driver.	LTTE	Sri Lankan Civil War
November 26	Assassination	1	0	Meta Department, Colombia	José Rodrigo García Orozco, a member of the Patriotic Union and Deputy of the Departmental Assembly, was assassinated.	Paramilitary	Colombian conflict
December 3	Bombing	14	0	Medellín, Colombia	Ten police officers and four civilians die when a bomb planted by drug cartels explode.	Medellín Cartel	Colombian conflict
December 9	Bombing	0	10	Bogotá, Colombia	Ten injured as bombs explode in several hotels	ELN	Colombian conflict
December 10	Shooting, Kidnapping	3	50 kidnapped	Antioquia, Colombia	About 40 gunmen of the Medellín Cartel, install an illegal stop on the avenue of Las Palmas, on the road that leads to the airport of Rionegro. 3 people are killed and 50 civilians kidnapped.	Medellín cartel	Colombian conflict
December 29	Bombing	0	52	Medellín, Colombia	Two police officers and 50 civilians wounded when a car bomb explodes at a party in a suburban area.	Medellín Cartel	Colombian conflict
December 29	Bombings	2	7	Aden, Yemen	Al-Qaeda bombs the Gold Mohur Hotel and Aden Mövenpick Hotel in hopes of killing American soldiers, but only succeed in killing an Austrian tourist and a hotel employee. The bombings were the first attack on Americans by Al-Qaeda.	Al-Qaeda	

== See also ==
- List of terrorist incidents
