= The Troubles in Jordanstown =

Incidents in Jordanstown, Northern Ireland during the Troubles

The Troubles in Jordanstown recounts incidents during, and the effects of, The Troubles in Jordanstown, Newtownabbey, County Antrim, Northern Ireland.

Incidents in Jordanstown during the Troubles resulting in two or more fatalities:

== 1983 ==
- 4 November 1983 - John Martin (28), Stephen Fyfe (28) and William McDonald (29), all members of the Royal Ulster Constabulary (RUC), were killed by a Provisional Irish Republican Army time bomb. Nuala O'Loan, in her capacity as a prison independent custody visitor (ICV), who was named Northern Ireland's first Police Ombudsman many years later, was injured in the attack, and, pregnant, lost the baby she was carrying at the time.

== See also ==
- The Troubles in Newtownabbey
- UDA South East Antrim Brigade
