= 1992 Houari Boumédiène Airport bombings =

Terrorist incident in Algeria

Houari Boumédiène Airport bombings
- Part of Algerian Civil War
- Location: Algiers, Algeria
- Date: 26 August 1992
- Deaths: 9
- Injuries: 123
- Perpetrator: Armed Islamic Group of Algeria

On 26 August 1992 in Algiers, Algeria, two bombs exploded and another was defused. The first exploded at Houari Boumedienne Airport, killing 9 people and injuring another 123. The bomb destroyed the Air France counter, wounding two of the carrier's employees. The airport was closed temporarily. A few minutes later, another exploded near an Air France office in central Algiers; it did not cause any injuries because the area had been evacuated three minutes before it exploded. A third bomb, at a Swissair office in central Algiers, was defused.

No group claimed responsibility for the bombings, which took place during the Algerian Civil War, but officials said that the airport bombing was carried out by the Armed Islamic Group of Algeria (GIA). On 26 May 1993, 38 people (26 in absentia) were sentenced to death for their roles in the airport bombing; 17 others were imprisoned and another three acquitted.

== See also ==
- List of terrorist incidents, 1992
