= Jacqui Durkin =

Police Ombudsman for Northern Ireland

Police Ombudsman for Northern Ireland
- Incumbent
- Assumed office 26 June 2026
- Preceded by: Marie Anderson

Chief Inspector of Criminal Justice in Northern Ireland
- In office 30 November 2019 – 26 June 2026
- Preceded by: Brendan McGuigan
- Succeeded by: James Corrigan (acting)

Personal details
- Occupation: Public official

Jacqui Durkin is a public official in Northern Ireland who was appointed Police Ombudsman for Northern Ireland in June 2026. She previously served as Chief Inspector of Criminal Justice in Northern Ireland from 2019 to 2026.

== Career ==
Durkin has worked in the Northern Ireland justice system for more than 30 years. Before joining Criminal Justice Inspection Northern Ireland, she held senior roles in the Northern Ireland Civil Service. She was Director of Wellbeing and Inclusion in the Department of Education, where her policy responsibilities included special educational needs, child safeguarding and protection, pupil behaviour, looked-after children and newcomer children and young people.

Durkin also held senior leadership roles in the former Northern Ireland Court Service, now the Northern Ireland Courts and Tribunals Service, including as Chief Executive and Accounting Officer. In 2007, she appeared before the Northern Ireland Assembly as head of court operations in the Northern Ireland Court Service during evidence on the devolution of policing and justice.

== Chief Inspector of Criminal Justice ==
Durkin was appointed Chief Inspector of Criminal Justice in Northern Ireland with effect from 30 November 2019, succeeding Brendan McGuigan. The Department of Justice said at the time that Criminal Justice Inspection Northern Ireland carried out cross-cutting and thematic inspections across the criminal justice system and that the Chief Inspector was an independent public voice intended to promote public confidence in the criminal justice system.

Durkin's first term as Chief Inspector was extended in 2022. In November 2024, Justice Minister Naomi Long announced Durkin's reappointment for a further three-year term following an open competition. The Department of Justice said that the Chief Inspector was responsible for developing and overseeing an independent inspection programme and making recommendations to improve performance across the justice sector.

In 2024, Durkin called for a "fundamental reset" within the Police Service of Northern Ireland and the Public Prosecution Service following a CJI inspection of the criminal justice system in Northern Ireland.

== Police Ombudsman for Northern Ireland ==
On 24 June 2026, First Minister Michelle O'Neill and deputy First Minister Emma Little-Pengelly announced Durkin's appointment as Police Ombudsman for Northern Ireland. The Executive Office said that Durkin would take up the post on 26 June 2026 and that the appointment was for a single seven-year term.

The Executive Office said that the Office of the Police Ombudsman had been established by the Police (Northern Ireland) Act 1998 to provide an independent means of handling complaints against the police, and that the Ombudsman was responsible for investigating complaints against the police and carrying out related statutory functions. It also said the appointment process attracted 21 applications, with seven candidates shortlisted and interviewed, and that Durkin had declared no political activity.

The Department of Justice said Durkin would replace Marie Anderson, who retired in December 2025. Justice Minister Naomi Long welcomed the appointment and thanked Durkin for her six-and-a-half-year tenure as Chief Inspector of Criminal Justice in Northern Ireland. The Department said an announcement about Durkin's replacement as Chief Inspector would be made in due course.

== Other appointments and voluntary work ==
The Department of Justice stated in 2024 that Durkin was a member of the board of governors of Victoria College and Knockbreda Nursery School, Belfast, and a volunteer for Home-Start.
