= The Troubles in Newtownabbey =

Overview of the Northern Ireland conflict

A list of violent incidents during the Troubles in Newtownabbey, County Antrim, Northern Ireland.

== 1972 ==
- 13 January - Maynard Crawford (38), an off-duty member of the Ulster Defence Regiment (UDR), was shot and killed by the Irish Republican Army (IRA) while driving a van along King's Road.
- 10 February - Joseph Cunningham (26), a member of the IRA, was shot and killed during a gun battle with Royal Ulster Constabulary (RUC) officers on O'Neill's Road.

== 1974 ==
- 31 January - Terence McCafferty (37) and James McCloskey (29), both Catholic civilians, were shot dead during a gun attack by the Ulster Freedom Fighters (UFF) on a workers' hut at a Northern Ireland Electricity Service building site, Rush Park.
- 11 February - Thomas Donaghy (16) and Margaret McErlean (18), both Catholic civilians, were shot dead by the UFF as they arrived at their workplace, Abbey Meat Packers, Glenville Road. McErlean died on 18 February 1974.

== 1976 ==
- 11 June - Edward Walker (20), a member of the Ulster Defence Association (UDA), was shot and killed by an RUC officer while travelling in a stolen car along Doagh Road.
- 18 November - gunmen fired into the home of a full-time member of the UDR, who returned fire and allegedly struck one of his attackers.

== 1983 ==
- 5 December - Joseph Craven (26), a member of the Irish National Liberation Army (INLA), was killed when he was shot by an Ulster Volunteer Force (UVF) gunman on a passing motorcycle while leaving an office on Church Road.

== 1994 ==
- 17 June - Cecil Dougherty (30) and William Corrigan (32), both Protestant civilians, were shot dead during a UVF gun attack on a workers hut, Rushpark, off Shore Road, Newtownabbey. They were assumed to have been Catholic. Corrigan died on 10 July 1994.

== See also ==
- The Troubles in Jordanstown
- The Troubles in Monkstown (Antrim)
- UDA South East Antrim Brigade
