= Joe Bratty =

Northern Irish loyalist (1961–1994)

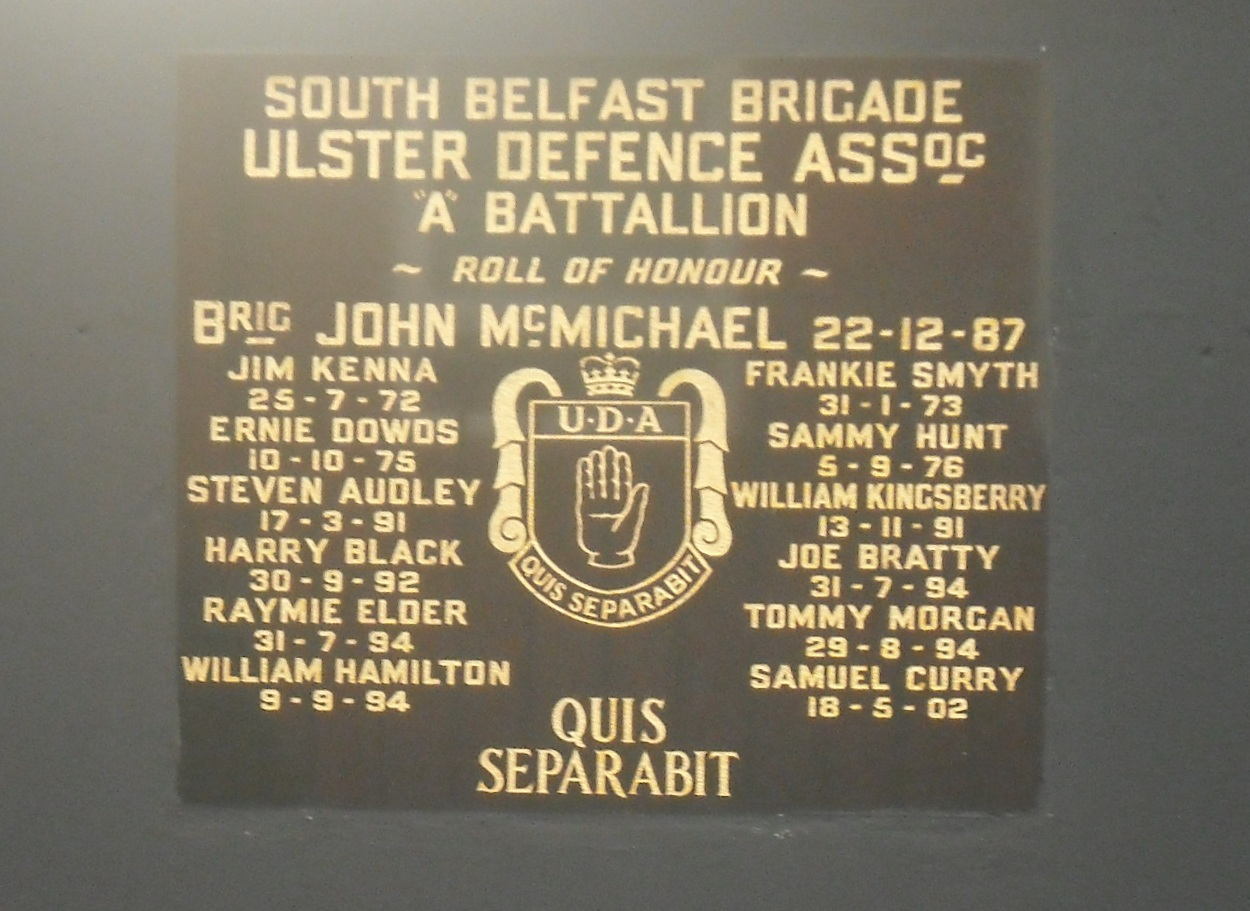
Bratty commemorated with other South Belfast UDA members on a Sandy Row plaque

Joe Bratty (c. 1961 – 31 July 1994) was a Northern Irish loyalist paramilitant and a leading member of the Ulster Defence Association's South Belfast Brigade. The head of UDA activity in the area during one of the organisation's most active phases, Bratty was suspected by security forces of playing a role in, or at least orchestrating, around 15 killings.

== Early years ==
Bratty first came to attention in his native Ballynafeigh (an area in south Belfast) as a teenage street-fighter battling with local Catholic/republican youths and was responsible for altering the Workers' Party slogan "Sectarianism Kills Workers" on the side of Havelock House to "Sectarianism Kills Taigs". Bratty, who was also known for his hatred of black people, also appended the initials of the Ku Klux Klan to this piece of graffiti. Bratty, who had distinctive Asian-shaped eyes, was given the nickname 'Chinky' by his Catholic opponents. Given the proximity of the two communities on the Ormeau Road, Bratty had grown up alongside Catholics and as such had for a number of years been accused of terrorising people he knew to be Catholic with beatings and intimidation before becoming involved in murder around 1990.

== UDA activity ==
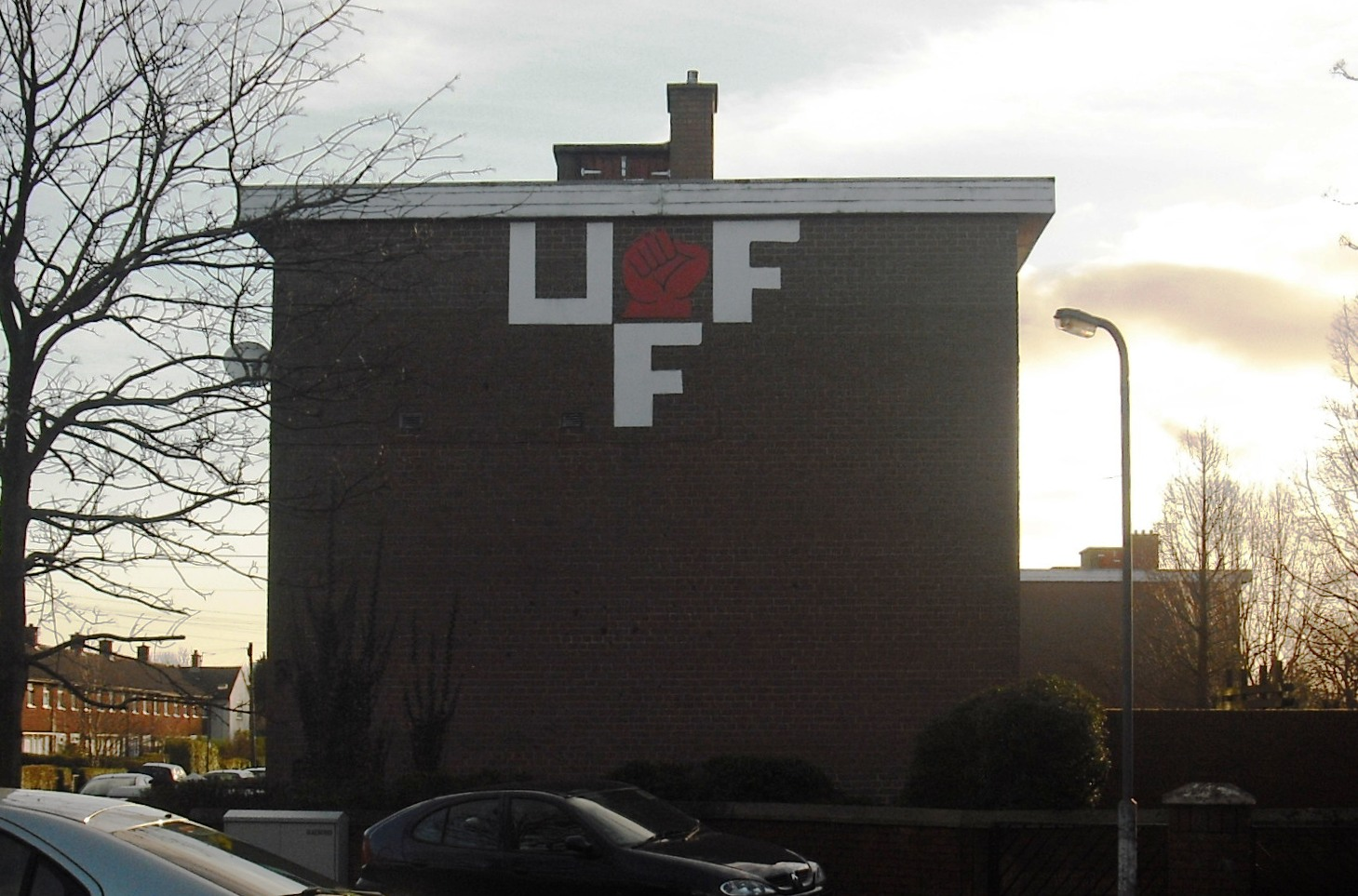
Ulster Freedom Fighters insignia continues to be displayed in the Annadale Flats area, January 2012

Eventually, Bratty became head of the UDA in Ballynafeigh, leading his own unit from Annadale Flats. Bratty's unit struck on 7 September 1990 when they entered the house of a 34-year-old Catholic, Emmanuel Shields, and shot him dead as he lay in bed with his pregnant girlfriend. According to his family, Shields, who had a criminal record but not for republican activity, had regularly been targeted by Bratty and his associates for physical attack in the past and they had fired shots into his mother's house in nearby Burmah Street when he lived with her. Bratty christened his unit 'Ku Klux Klan', and members of the group, including himself, had the initials KKK tattooed on their arms.

Bratty, together with Stephen "Inch" McFerran, UDA military commander for the Ormeau area and RUC Special Branch agent, ordered the attack on the lower Ormeau branch of Sean Graham's bookmakers on 5 February 1992, an act resulting in the death of five civilian men. His right-hand man, Raymond Elder, was identified by witnesses as one of the gunmen in the attack, and fibres from the getaway car were found on his denims. Bratty was widely believed to have been present during the attack, although the rest of the team that Bratty sent was made up of UDA members from East Belfast rather than local members. Another gunman had been provided by UDA West Belfast Brigade leader Johnny Adair, who had first conceived of the action. Alex Kerr, Bratty's commanding officer as South Belfast brigadier, commended the attack, claiming that Lower Ormeau residents had been involved in shielding republicans before suggesting that the attack was revenge for the Teebane bombing.

In addition to the 5 February Ormeau Road shootings, Bratty's unit was allegedly involved in the murder of Michael Gilbride, a Catholic taxi driver who had settled in the Lower Ormeau area. Gilbride was killed outside his parents' home on Fernwood Street not far from Bratty's Annadale Flats base. Another victim was Donna Wilson, a Protestant and resident of Annadale Flats who had recently moved to the area from Tullycarnet, East Belfast. A number of residents had complained to Bratty in his role as local UDA commander about the noise of her stereo and he assembled a team of ten men armed with baseball bats who broke in, beat her to death (seriously injuring three of her companions) and wrecked the flat. In the end, only a sixty-year-old who had led the complaints to Bratty was charged in relation to Wilson's death. Bratty was also identified as the getaway driver for the attack in which Teresa Clinton, the wife of a Sinn Féin election candidate, was murdered in her Lower Ormeau home. Thomas "Tucker" Annett, one of Bratty's closest lieutenants, was identified as the main gunman although not charged. Annett died on 12 July 1996 as part of an internal UDA dispute when two fellow members of the organisation kicked him to death outside a bar on the Ormeau Road. One of the killers has since been identified as Stephen "Inch" McFerran.

== Death ==
Bratty was first targeted in late 1991 by the Provisional IRA when they decided to adopt the tactic of focusing on prominent loyalist paramilitaries alongside the security forces. Bratty's Annadale Flats home was attacked on 13 November, but Bratty was not at home and no one was hurt. Some time after this attack, Bratty moved from the Annadale Flats to live in Greenwood Lodge on the Upper Newtownards Road in East Belfast.

Bratty and Raymond Elder were shot dead by the IRA on 31 July 1994, in an act seen as one of a number of "revenge attacks" immediately prior to the IRA ceasefire. The pair had been drinking in the Kimberley Inn off the Ormeau Road unaware that the IRA had been informed of their whereabouts. A nearby IRA unit dispatched an assassination squad that lay in wait, hidden in a white van parked right in front of Bratt's car. On the loyalist group entering the Ormeau Road from Deramore Avenue, Elder was ordered to check out the van but failed to spot anyone inside. Seconds later three gunmen, armed with AK-47 assault rifles and a pistol, emerged from the van and shot repeatedly at their targets. Elder was killed close to the car almost opposite South Parade while Bratty managed to run across the Ormeau Road before being shot dead, 18 bullets in his body. The getaway car was pursued by a Royal Ulster Constabulary vehicle that was in the area but the chase stopped when the police vehicle was impeded by a crowd of republicans. Bratty was 33 years old at the time of his death. He left behind a widow and three children. His son was given honorary membership of the Paisley Imperial Blues flute band, the leading UDA-aligned flute band in Scotland, immediately following his father's death.

In late July 2024, a UDA shrine to Bratty and Elder was removed from a garden of remembrance in Annadale Flats to the British Army.

== Reaction ==
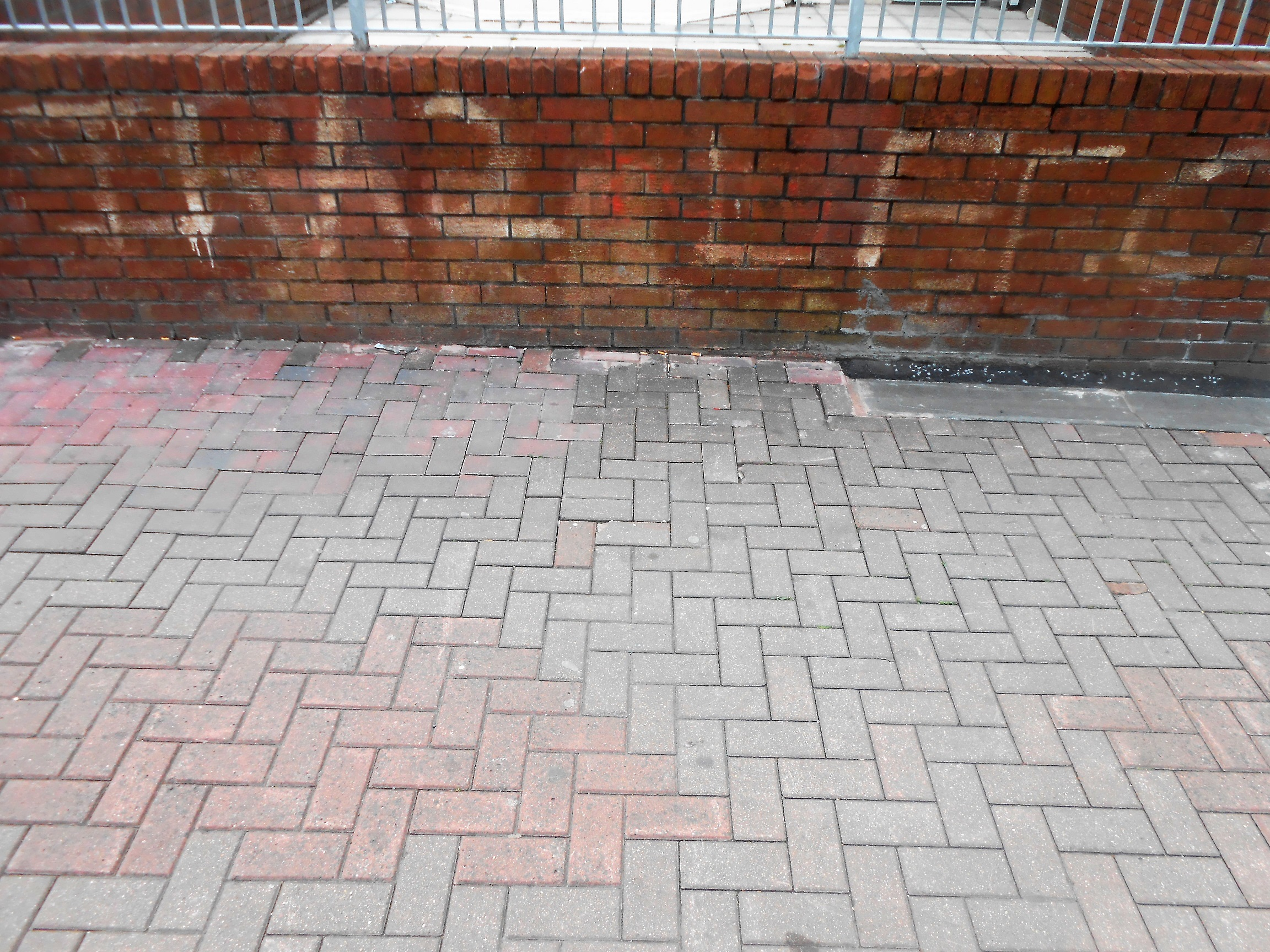
Contemporaneous graffiti celebrating the killings of Bratty and Elder, still extant in 2017. Lower Ormeau Road

The killing of Bratty was greeted with relief, even by some nationalist residents of the Lower Ormeau normally opposed to violence. However, the aftermath saw three Catholics killed by the UDA in separate attacks with these sparking a series of IRA bomb attacks on loyalist bars, thus bringing about a temporary return to the spiral of tit-for-tat killing. The killings of Bratty and Elder, along with that of Ulster Democratic Party (UDP) leader Ray Smallwoods earlier the same month, played a central role in delaying the Combined Loyalist Military Command (CLMC) ceasefire. The CLMC had been considering declaring a ceasefire following the Loughinisland massacre, but reversed their decision after these three killings as they believed that any cessation of violence would have then been seen as a sign of weakness. This was confirmed by the UDP's David Adams, who said the CLMC was ready to call a ceasefire in late June/early July 1994, although his party colleague Gary McMichael admitted the killings of Bratty and Smallwoods convinced him that an IRA ceasefire was near as he felt these were long-standing targets who were being killed before calling a halt to hostilities.

Certain hardline elements with the UDA would later claim that Bratty's killing had been sanctioned by members of the CLMC who were eager to see a ceasefire as Bratty had been an outspoken opponent of the initiative, although these allegations were never proven. Pastor Kenny McClinton, a dissident former UDA gunman who was variously associated with the Ulster Independence Movement, the Loyalist Volunteer Force and the Orange Volunteers, even suggested in a pamphlet that Bratty's killing had been arranged by the Progressive Unionist Party (PUP). This was part of a wider theme in McClinton's writing arguing that the PUP was a front for MI5 activity.

Bratty and Elder were commemorated in a wall plaque erected outside the Kimberley Bar. The pub, where the pair had been on the day they were killed, was known as a UDA stronghold in the area. In 2007, a banner honouring Bratty during Twelfth of July celebrations by members of the Orange Order was met by outrage from the relatives of those Bratty allegedly killed.

An August 2014 march commemorating the pair was condemned by both nationalist politicians and the Ulster Unionist Party after it ended with a ceremony in a Housing Executive-funded First World War garden of remembrance close to the Annadale Flats.
