= Al Hutchinson =

Irish policeman

Al Hutchinson is a former RCMP Assistant Commissioner, who served as the Police Oversight Commissioner in Northern Ireland and became the second Police Ombudsman for Northern Ireland in November 2007.

A graduate of Carleton University, Ottawa, and Queen's University, Belfast, Hutchinson served in the Office of the Oversight Commissioner, Tom Constantine, who was charged with overseeing the Patten Reforms of the RUC, from 2001 until Constantine's retirement. In January 2004 until the completion of the Oversight in May 2007 Hutchinson served as Oversight Commissioner.

On 26 June 2007 Hutchinson was announced as the successor to Nuala O'Loan as Police Ombudsman, and took up the office on 6 November 2007.

In June 2011, his performance was criticized by the Committee on the Administration for Justice (CAJ). In September 2011, Hutchinson was criticised in a report by the Criminal Justice Inspectorate. The report branded the organisation's management as "dysfunctional", uncovered a major split in its staff, and found Hutchinson had lost the trust of senior colleagues. It recommended that the Ombudsman's office should be suspended from investigating historic murders because of a "lowering of independence" in the office. He resigned in January 2012.

In 2012, the Belfast High Court quashed the Ombudsman report's findings on the Loughinisland massacre. Hutchinson was replaced by Michael Maguire, who ordered a new inquiry.

== See also ==
Northern Ireland Office

Civic offices
Preceded by Nuala O'Loan	Police Ombudsman for Northern Ireland; 2007 to 2011	Succeeded by Michael Maguire
