= 1992 Sinn Féin Headquarters shooting =

1992 shooting committed by an off-duty RUC constable

Sinn Féin Headquarters shooting
- Part of the Troubles
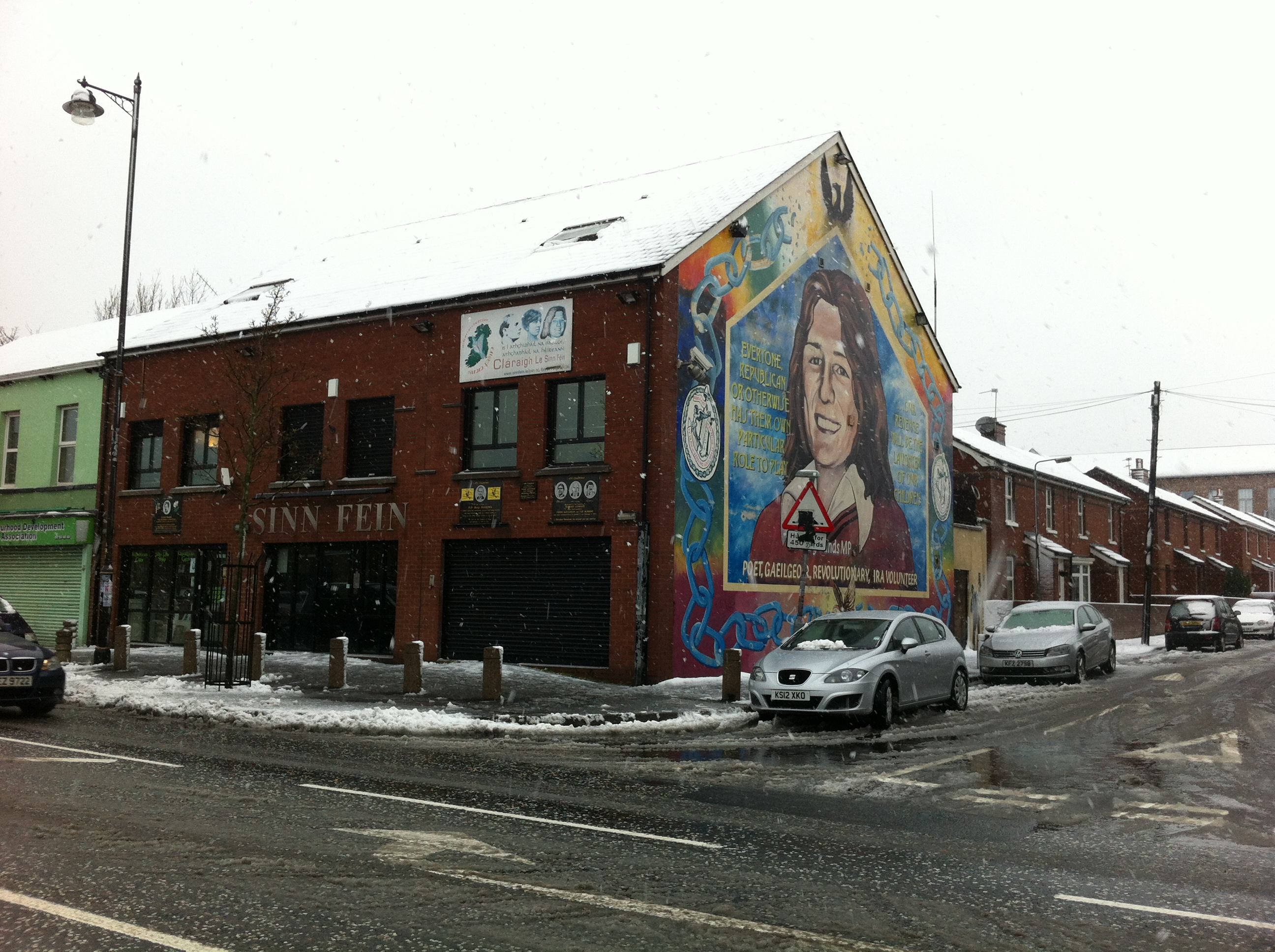

- Location: Falls Road, Belfast, Northern Ireland
- Date: 4 February 1992 c. 1:15 p.m. (GMT)
- Target: Sinn Féin workers and activists
- Attack type: Mass shooting, murder–suicide, mass murder
- Weapon: Pump-action shotgun
- Deaths: 4 (including the perpetrator)
- Injuries: 2
- Perpetrator: James Allen Moore

A mass shooting was committed by an 24-year-old off-duty RUC officer named Allen Moore at Sinn Féin's Falls Road office on Sevastopol Street in Belfast, Northern Ireland, on 4 February 1992. The shooting left three people dead and two injured.

== Background ==
Some time prior to the shooting, James Allen Moore (born 1967), a Constable in the anti-terrorist Divisional Mobile Support Unit (DMSU) of the RUC, had visited the grave of an RUC colleague in Comber, County Down. While there, he fired shots over the grave with a shotgun, before he was disarmed by other RUC members and taken to Newtownards RUC barracks, where he appeared agitated and aggressively intoxicated. When his blood alcohol levels were tested they were found to be over two and a half times the legal limit. The station doctor later said that he appeared to be suffering from an unusual degree of grief and depression, but that he had not detected anything that indicated psychiatric illness.

While in the barracks, Moore called a colleague in Armagh, where was previously stationed, and talked about shooting republican suspects, however despite warning to another office present from his superior officer, Moore was allowed to leave Newtownards RUC station with his shotgun. Moore then went to stay with a colleague for the night, but failed to show up for a RUC medical examination the next morning, prompting a search for him out of concern for himself and others.

== Shooting ==
While off-duty, Moore entered Sinn Féin's Falls Road office on Sevastopol Street at around 1.15 p.m. He walked in carrying a suitcase which was carrying a shotgun, he walked up to the office attendant Paddy Loughran and claimed he was a journalist and was there for a press review, Loughran notified the on-duty press officer who told Loughran that there was not an interview scheduled that day. The press officer informed Loughran that he was on his way to the inquiry but as the press officer was walking over Loughran shouted over the intercom “He’s got a gun,” and Moore then shot Loughran dead and opened fired indiscriminately.

Moore shot a total of five people. Three of them were killed, the three being door attendant Patrick ‘Paddy’ Loughran (61), an activist Patrick ‘Pat’ McBride (40), and a local waiting for an appointment as he was seeking advice Michael O'Dwyer (24) who was shot in the chest as his 2-year-old son Michael O'Dwyer Jr. sat on his knee, the child was unharmed. Two others were injured in the shooting, the two being, Patrick ‘Pat’ Wilson (28) was in critical condition after being shot in the chest, and Norah ‘Kate’ Larkin was grazed in the head.

While Moore attempted to leave, a stalwart from the neighbouring Green Cross Art Shop, Marguerite Gallagher, attempted to prevent him from leaving, holding on to him until Moore got to his car where Moore pushed her off of him.

At around 1.30 p.m. people trying to give aid to the wounded were assaulted by responding officers, resulting in a pregnant woman being punched in her stomach with a rifle butt, which resulted in her having to be taken to a hospital.

After making a phone call to the RUC from a pub in North Belfast to claim responsibility, Moore drove around 15 miles to Ballinderry on the shore of Lough Neagh, where he killed himself with his gun, his body was discovered three hours later.

== Victims ==
Patrick "Paddy" Loughran (born 1930) was a father of eight and worked as a door attendant at Sinn Féin's office. In St. Clair Bourne's 1983 documentary The Black and the Green, Rev. Dr. Herbert Daughtry of the National Black United Front talked with Loughran, Daughtry said “I wanted to see for myself with my own experience and then go back and say this is what I have found. Those of us who have been here have been very moved by the striking similarities between Irish here and Blacks: our struggles, our resilience, our humor, our kindness. But as you’ve pointed out, in the States, Irish and Blacks do not have a history of getting on together.” Loughran responded “That’s one thing I can’t understand. Irish people in America try and say that they are better than Black people, for simple reasoning they have came here, and I say the people who left Ireland to move to America was during the famine, and they were completely oppressed and by British, by Cromwell so they had to move out during the famine of starvation and the oppression,” he then added “they sort of started doing the exact same thing the British were doing to them, trying to sort of belittle Black people just because of the color of skin.”

Patrick "Pat" McBride (born 1951) was a father of one and a Sinn Féin activist who also ran a disco at several venues geared towards children. On 5 January 1989 at around 5.05 a.m. constables arrested McBride at his home and was taken to Castlereagh, he was held for four days and was interrogated a total of 22 times during his detention he had to see his medical practitioner eight times. McBride only met his solicitor twice, once on 5 January and once on 7 January. McBride was released on 9 January 1989 at around 11.30 a.m. after spending a total of four days six hours and 25 minutes in custody. Shortly after McBrides death his family along with a laborer from Downpatrick, Peter Brannigan (born 1964) and his family launched the case Brannigan and McBride v. the United Kingdom in the European Court of Human Rights on 21 February 1992, the hearing took place on 24 November 1992. Brannigan had received the same treatment as McBride having been detained on 9 January 1989 at around 9.30 a.m. and was released on 15 January 1989 at around 9 p.m. he was supposed to be released on 12 January but they extended his detention at 9.32 p.m. Brannigan spent a total of six days, 14 hours, and 30 minutes. Brannigan had been interrogated 43 times and had to see his medical practitioner 17 times. Brannigan was only allowed to see his solicitor once on 11 January.

Michael O'Dwyer (born 1967) was a father of one. On 17 January 1976 when O'Dwyer was 8-years-old his mother Sarah O'Dwyer (47) was killed in a loyalist bombing at Sheridan's Bar in the New Lodge area of Belfast, another man James Reid (47) a father of 10 was also killed, and 26 were injured.

== Legacy ==
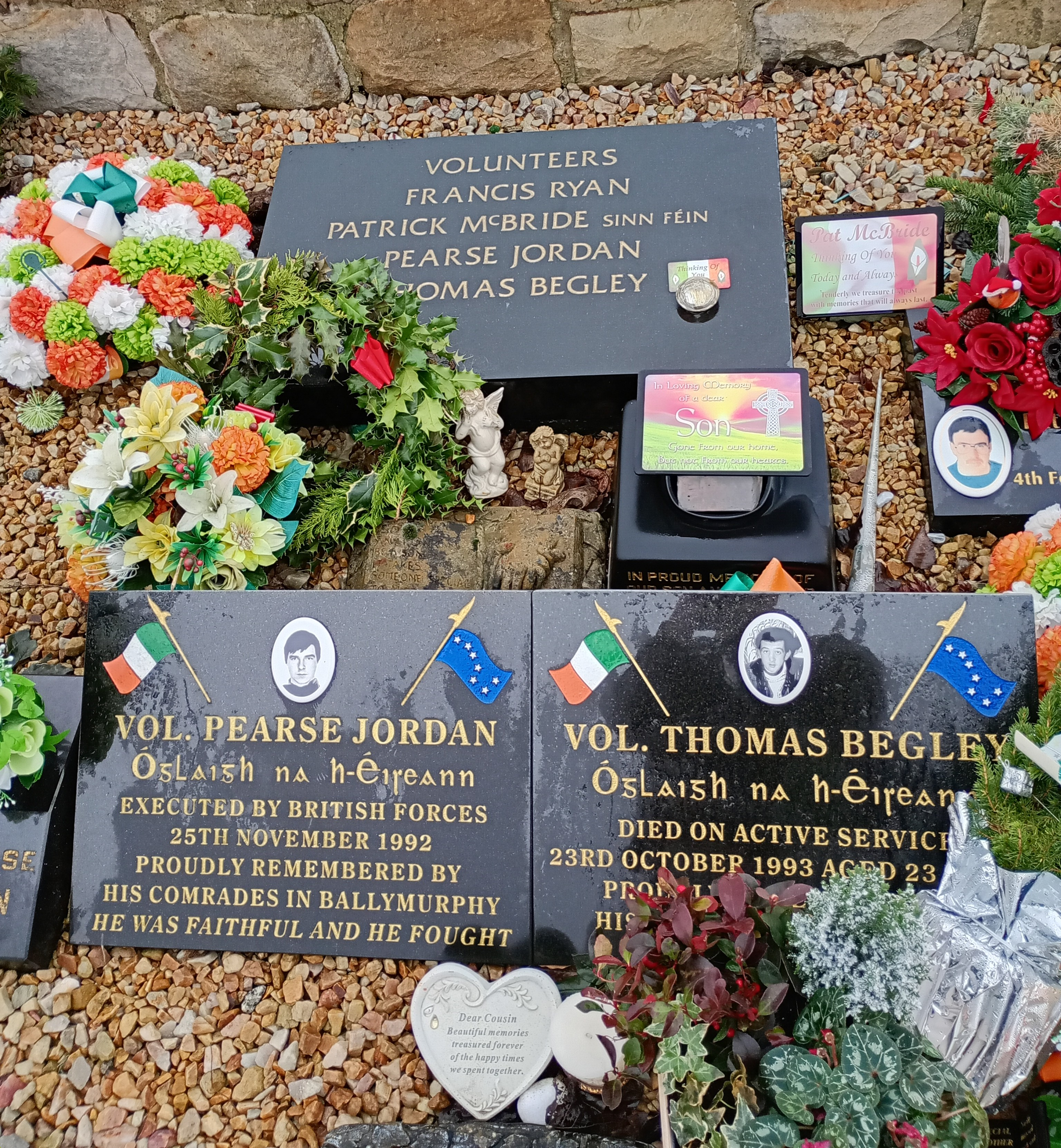
Grave of McBride, Pearse Jordan and Thomas Begley in Milltown Cemetery, Belfast

On the 10th anniversary of the shooting in 2002, a memorial plaque was erected at the office by Sinn Féin to commemorate the victims of the shooting.

On the 25th anniversary of the shooting in 2017, then Sinn Féin president Gerry Adams criticized the British government, saying "The attack on the Falls Road Sinn Fein office, like other similar attacks, were part of British government counterinsurgency strategies aimed at suppressing dissent to British rule." Adams also criticized the then Secretary of State for Northern Ireland, James Brokenshire, who opposed legacy inquests citing national security risks.

In August 2020 the leader of the Relatives for Justice a group for victims of the Troubles, Mark Thompson accused the Royal Ulster Constabulary George Cross Foundation of supporting Allen Moore's family and putting him on the RUC's roll of honor of murdered constables at the PSNI headquarters. The RUCGC Foundation's chairman Stephen White responded with “I am appalled that Mark Thompson on BBC Radio Ulster Talkback said that RUC officer Alan Moore who murdered three men in 1992 receives support from the RUCGC Foundation. This is utter nonsense and a complete untruth as the constable who all right-thinking people recognize as a murderer killed himself after he committed his crimes. To say that I’m disappointed in Mark Thompson’s false allegation is an understatement. He diminishes the foundation which was established in law to ‘mark the sacrifices and honor the achievements of the RUC’ and insults all those law-abiding police officers who served with courage and distinction. Furthermore, he said the officer is on our roll of honor. Our roll of murdered officers is simply that Constable Moore was not murdered and his name is not recorded with those decent men and women slaughtered by terrorists.”

== See also ==
- Sean Graham bookmakers' shooting, mass shooting in the Falls Road that happened the next day
