= Office of the Oversight Commissioner =

The Office of the Oversight Commissioner for Northern Ireland was established after a recommendation was made in the Patten Report (September 1999) by the Independent Commission on Policing for Northern Ireland. It is required to prepare a statement of accounts for each financial year in the form and on the basis directed by the Secretary of State, with the approval of HM Treasury, under paragraph 9(1) of Schedule 4 to the Police (Northern Ireland) Act 2000.

On 31 May 2000 Tom Constantine was appointed as the first Oversight Commissioner by the Secretary of State. On 1 January 2004 he was succeeded by Al Hutchinson.
