= Sean Graham bookmakers' shooting =

Mass shooting in Belfast, Northern Ireland

- Part of the Troubles
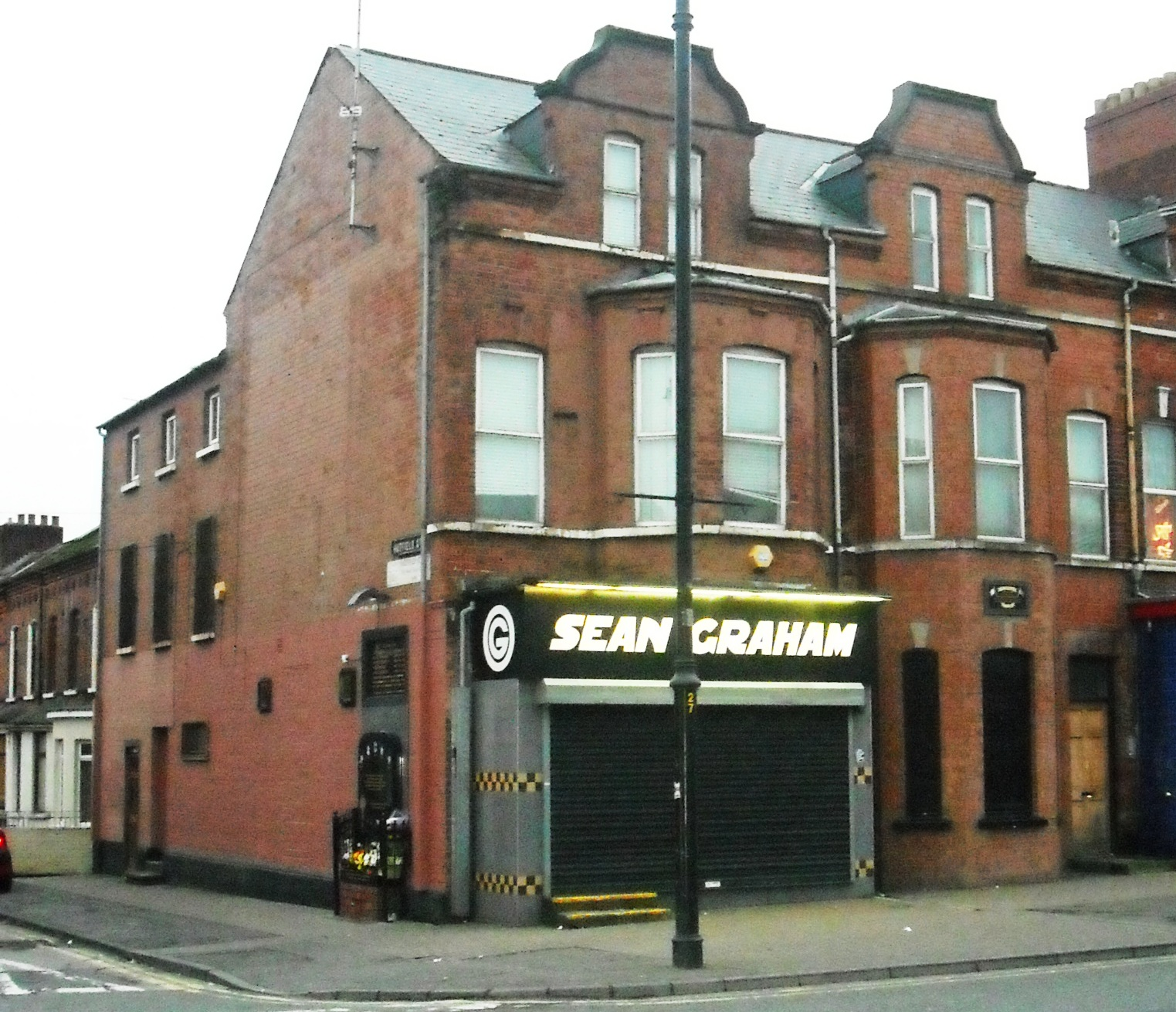
- The scene of the attack

- Location: 54°35′07.8″N 5°55′22.7″W; 132–134 Ormeau Road, Belfast, Northern Ireland
- Date: 5 February 1992; 14:20 (GMT)
- Attack type: Mass shooting
- Deaths: 5 civilians
- Injuries: 9
- Perpetrator: Ulster Defence Association (South Belfast Brigade)

On 5 February 1992, there was a mass shooting at the Sean Graham bookmaker's shop on the Lower Ormeau Road in Belfast, Northern Ireland. Members of the Ulster Defence Association (UDA), a loyalist paramilitary group, opened fire on the customers with an assault rifle and handgun, killing five civilians and wounding nine. The shop was in a Catholic and Irish nationalist area and all of the victims were local Catholics. The UDA claimed responsibility using the cover name "Ulster Freedom Fighters", saying the shooting was retaliation for the Teebane bombing, which had been carried out by the Provisional IRA less than three weeks before. A later investigation by the Police Ombudsman found that the Royal Ulster Constabulary (RUC) had engaged in "collusive behaviour" with UDA informers involved in the attack.

== Background ==
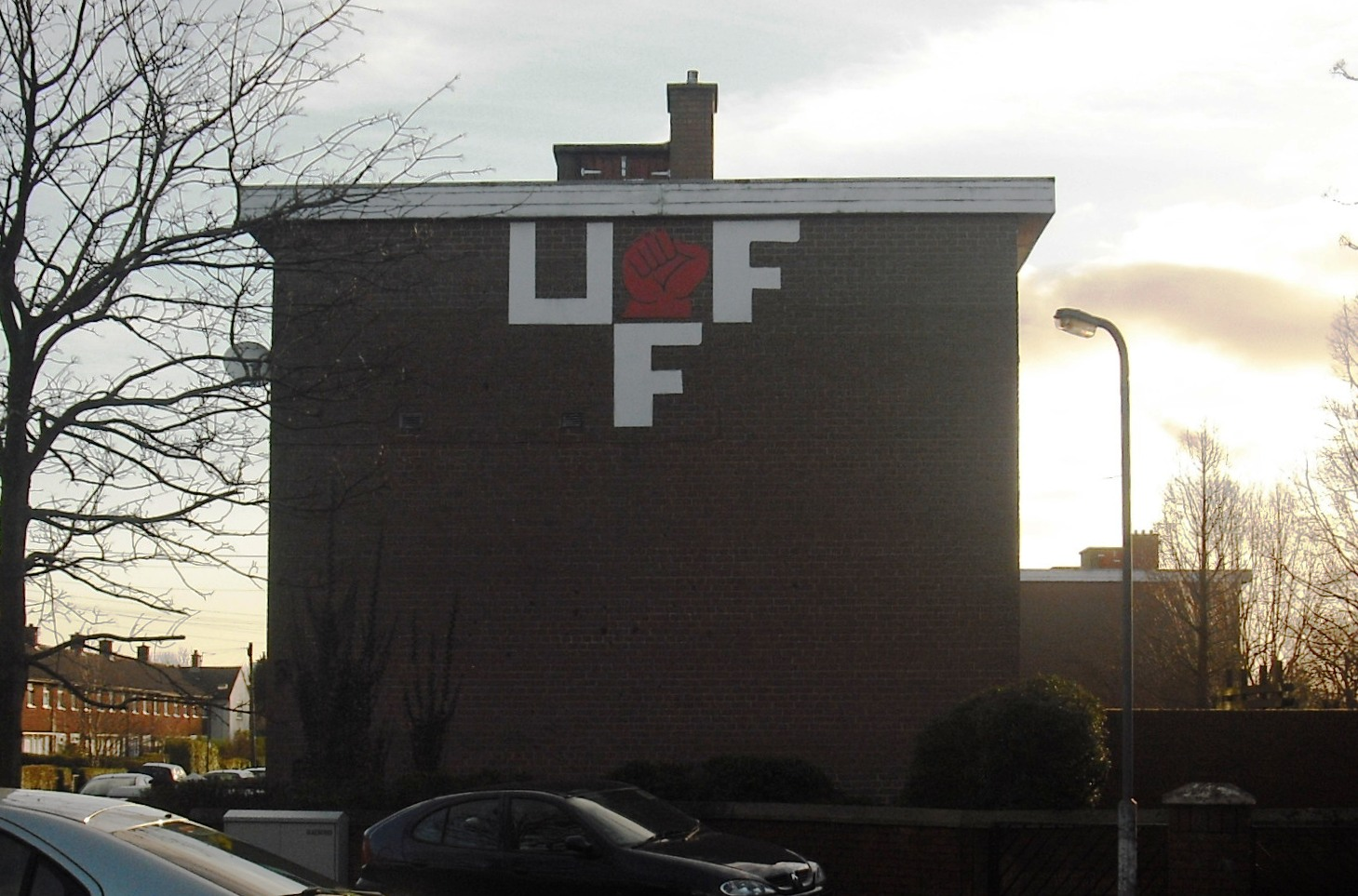
Ulster Freedom Fighters insignia in the Annadale Flats area, January 2012

The start of 1992 had witnessed an intensification in the campaign of violence being carried out by the Ulster Defence Association (UDA) under their UFF cover name. The group's first killing that year was on 9 January when Catholic civilian Phillip Campbell was shot dead at his place of work near Moira by a Lisburn-based UDA unit. The same group killed another Catholic civilian, Paul Moran, at the end of the month and a few days later taxi driver Paddy Clarke was killed at his north Belfast home by members of the UDA West Belfast Brigade.

However, the Inner Council of the UDA, which contained the six brigadiers that controlled the organisation, felt that these one-off killings were not sending a strong enough message to republicans and so it sanctioned a higher-profile attack in which a number of people would be killed at once. On this basis the go-ahead was given to attack Sean Graham bookmaker's shop on the Irish nationalist Lower Ormeau Road. This was a major arterial route in the city and was near the UDA stronghold of Annadale Flats. According to David Lister and Hugh Jordan, the bookmaker's shop was chosen by West Belfast Brigadier and Inner Council member Johnny Adair because he had strong personal ties with the commanders of the Annadale UDA. A 1993 report commissioned by RUC Special Branch also claimed that Adair was the driving force behind the attack.

== Shooting ==
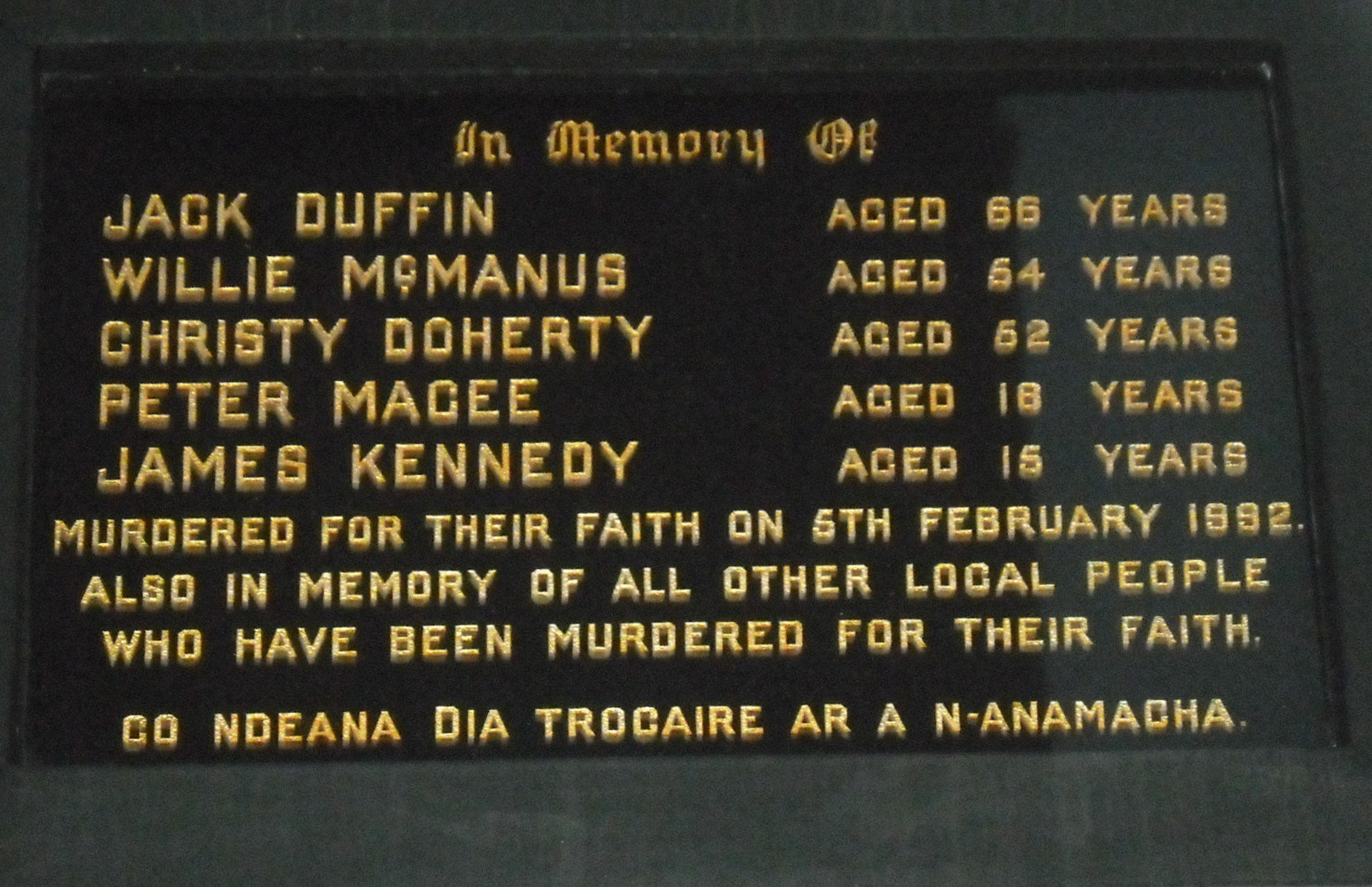
Names of the dead commemorated on a plaque in Hatfield Street

The attack occurred at 2:20 p.m. Two men, wearing boiler suits and black balaclavas, got out of a car on University Avenue and crossed the Ormeau Road to the bookmakers. One was armed with a vz.58 Czechoslovak assault rifle and the other with a 9mm Browning Hi-Power pistol. They entered the shop and fired indiscriminately at the fifteen customers, unleashing 44 rounds. One opened fire with the assault rifle before the other shot victims with the handgun as they lay on the ground. The gunmen then ran back to the car and sped off.

Five Catholic men and boys were killed: Christy Doherty (52), Jack Duffin (66), James Kennedy (15), Peter Magee (18) and William McManus (54). Nine others were wounded, one critically. Four of them died at the scene, while 15-year-old Kennedy survived until he reached the hospital, his final words being reported as "tell my mummy that I love her". Kennedy's mother Kathleen died two years later after becoming a recluse. Her husband, James (Sr.), blamed his wife's death on the shooting, saying "the bullets that killed James didn't just travel in distance; they travelled in time. Some of those bullets never stopped travelling".

One of the wounded described the shooting to British journalist Peter Taylor:

There was a right crowd in [the betting shop] and I cracked a joke with a couple of them – they were like that, always laughing and carrying on. I had only been in for about twenty or twenty-five minutes when the shooting started – I was standing next to the door with a docket in my hand studying the form. At first I thought it was a hold-up but then the shooting started and somebody yelled, 'Hit the deck'. I just lay there and prayed that the shooting would stop. It seemed to go on for a lifetime. There wasn't a sound for a few seconds – everybody was so stunned, but then the screaming started. People were yelling out in agony. You could hardly see anything. The room was full of gun smoke and the smell would have choked you.

In a separate incident, a unit of the Ulster Volunteer Force (UVF) had travelled to the area at the same time to kill a local Sinn Féin activist, based on intelligence that he returned home about that time every day. The attack was abandoned, however, when Royal Ulster Constabulary (RUC) vehicles and ambulances sped past the UVF unit's car. The UVF members, who had already retrieved their weapons for the attack, were said to be livid with the UDA for not coordinating with them beforehand and spoiling their chance to kill a leading local republican.

== Aftermath and reactions ==
A UDA statement in the aftermath of the attack claimed that the killings were justified as the Lower Ormeau was "one of the IRA's most active areas". The statement also included the phrase "remember Teebane", suggesting that they intended the killings as retaliation for the Teebane bombing in County Tyrone less than three weeks earlier. In that attack, the IRA had killed eight Protestant men who were repairing a British Army base. The same statement had also been yelled by the gunmen as they ran from the betting shop. Alex Kerr, who was then UDA Brigadier for South Belfast, released a second statement about a month after the attack in which he sought to justify the killings. Kerr stated that "the IRA was extremely active in the lower Ormeau and the nationalist population there shielded them. They paid the price for Teebane". He added that if there were any further bombings like that at Teebane then the UDA would retaliate in the same way as at Sean Graham's.

The idea that the killings were justified because of Teebane was shunned by Rev. Ivor Smith, a Presbyterian minister who was based in the area and who worked with the families of the bomb victims. He said that the UDA claim was "like a knife through the heart. We were absolutely appalled at the thought that somebody would try to do something like that and justify it by bringing in Teebane. As far as the families were concerned, it was very definitely not 'in my name'". A letter expressing deep sympathy from Betty Gilchrist, a Protestant whose husband had been killed at Teebane, was read out at the funeral of Jack Duffin.

Seventeen people were arrested and questioned about the attack. Two were charged with the murders, but the charges were later withdrawn, and no one has been convicted for the killings. Locally, the blame fell on Joe Bratty and his sidekick Raymond Elder, two leading figures in the South Belfast UDA. Elder was identified by witnesses as one of the gunmen and fibres from the getaway car were found on his denims. He was charged with involvement in the attack but the charges were withdrawn. It has been claimed that Bratty planned the attack, but did not take part in it. Lister and Jordan claim that one of the gunmen was from the West Belfast UDA and was supplied to Bratty by Johnny Adair. Following his release from custody, Adair organised a lavish celebration party for Bratty and Elder in Scotland where he allegedly gave Bratty a gold ring inscribed with the initials UFF.

The IRA did not immediately retaliate, although in a statement they claimed to know the identity of the killers and claimed they would "take them out when the time was right". When Bratty and Elder were shot dead by the IRA in July 1994, revellers in the Lower Ormeau hailed the attack as revenge for Sean Graham's.

When a July 1992 Orange Order march passed the scene of the shooting, Orangemen shouted pro-UDA slogans and held aloft five fingers as a taunt to residents over the five deaths. The claim is corroborated by Henry McDonald and Jim Cusack. The images of Orangemen and loyalist flute band members holding up five fingers as they passed the shop were beamed around the world and was a public relations disaster for the Order. Patrick Mayhew, then Secretary of State for Northern Ireland, said that the actions of the marchers "would have disgraced a tribe of cannibals". The incident led to a more concerted effort by Lower Ormeau residents to have the marches banned from the area, which later succeeded.

In February 2012 Jackie McDonald, the incumbent commander of the UDA South Belfast Brigade (the area in which the shop is located), admitted that the victims of the shooting had been innocent. However, McDonald said that he could not apologise for the attack, arguing that as he was imprisoned at the time he played no part in what had happened. In an earlier interview with Peter Taylor, McDonald suggested that it was the rise in sectarian killings and attacks such as that at Sean Graham's that "brought about the ceasefire at the end of the day".

== Historical Enquiries Team and Ombudsman reports ==
The attack was one of a number to be investigated by the Historical Enquiries Team (HET) in 2010. It found that the Browning pistol used in the attack came from the security forces. It was given to the UDA by a soldier who had taken it from an Army base. William Stobie, a UDA quartermaster and police informer, handed the gun to his police handlers and they gave it back to him. Police "may have thought they had tampered with it to prevent it from being used". According to the HET report this operation "would have required both the authority of a senior police officer and a recovery plan [...] within a short period of time. Clearly in this case, there was a significant failure and the repercussions were tragic and devastating". The report stated that the gun was used in other UDA killings. Police also told the HET that the assault rifle used in the attack had been "disposed of", but it was later found on display in the Imperial War Museum.

Alex Maskey, a Sinn Féin MLA for the area, commented that "the finding by the HET that the Browning pistol used by the UDA in this attack was handed back to them by the RUC will come as no surprise to the people of the Lower Ormeau area, who have long known that a high degree of collusion took place in this attack".

An investigation by the Police Ombudsman concluded in 2022 that police engaged in "collusive behaviour" with the South Belfast UDA. Those suspected of involvement in the attack were police informers. It noted that a UDA informer handed the Browning pistol to police, who deactivated it before handing it back, along with other guns. The gun was then re-activated by the UDA. There were also "significant" failures in the police investigation: blood found on the coat of a suspect was not tested, a suspect's alibi was not checked, and there was "deliberate destruction" of files on the attack. However, the Ombudsman found no evidence the attack could have been prevented.

== Commemoration ==
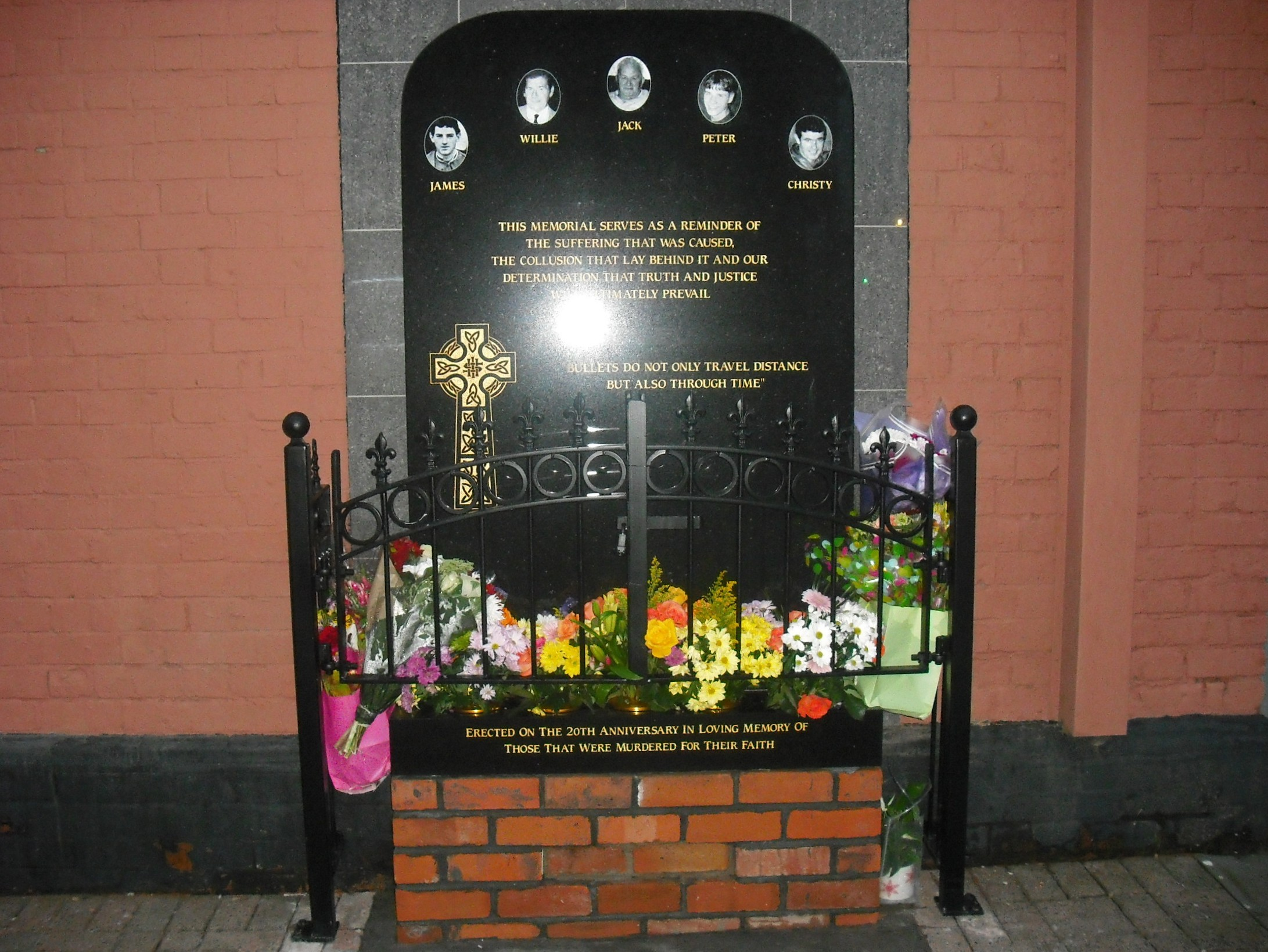
Memorial stone laid in February 2012

On 5 February 2002 a plaque was erected on the side of the bookmaker's shop in Hatfield Street carrying the names of the five victims and the Irish language inscription Go ndéana Dia trócaire ar a n-anamacha ("May God have mercy on their souls"). A small memorial garden was later added. The unveiling ceremony, which took place on the tenth anniversary of the attack, was accompanied by a two-minute silence and was attended by relatives of the dead and survivors of the attack. A new memorial stone was laid on 5 February 2012 to coincide with the publication of a booklet calling for justice for the killings.

On 5 February 2021, a group of people, who were paying tribute to the victims of the attack, were arrested by the members of the Police service of Northern Ireland (PSNI), for reportedly not adhering to COVID-19 regulations. One of the survivors of the shooting, Mark Sykes, was taken into custody. He was released by evening. The incident was subsequently investigated by the Police Ombudsman, and the Chief Constable, Simon Byrne, said the force was reviewing video footage from officers' body cameras. Byrne eventually offered his apologies "to all those who were present or had been affected by what they had seen on social media." One PSNI officer was suspended and another repositioned.

== See also ==
- 1992 Sinn Féin Headquarters shooting, mass shooting in the Falls Road that happened the day before
- Timeline of Ulster Defence Association actions
- UDA South Belfast Brigade
