= Herbert Daughtry =

American pastor and community organizer

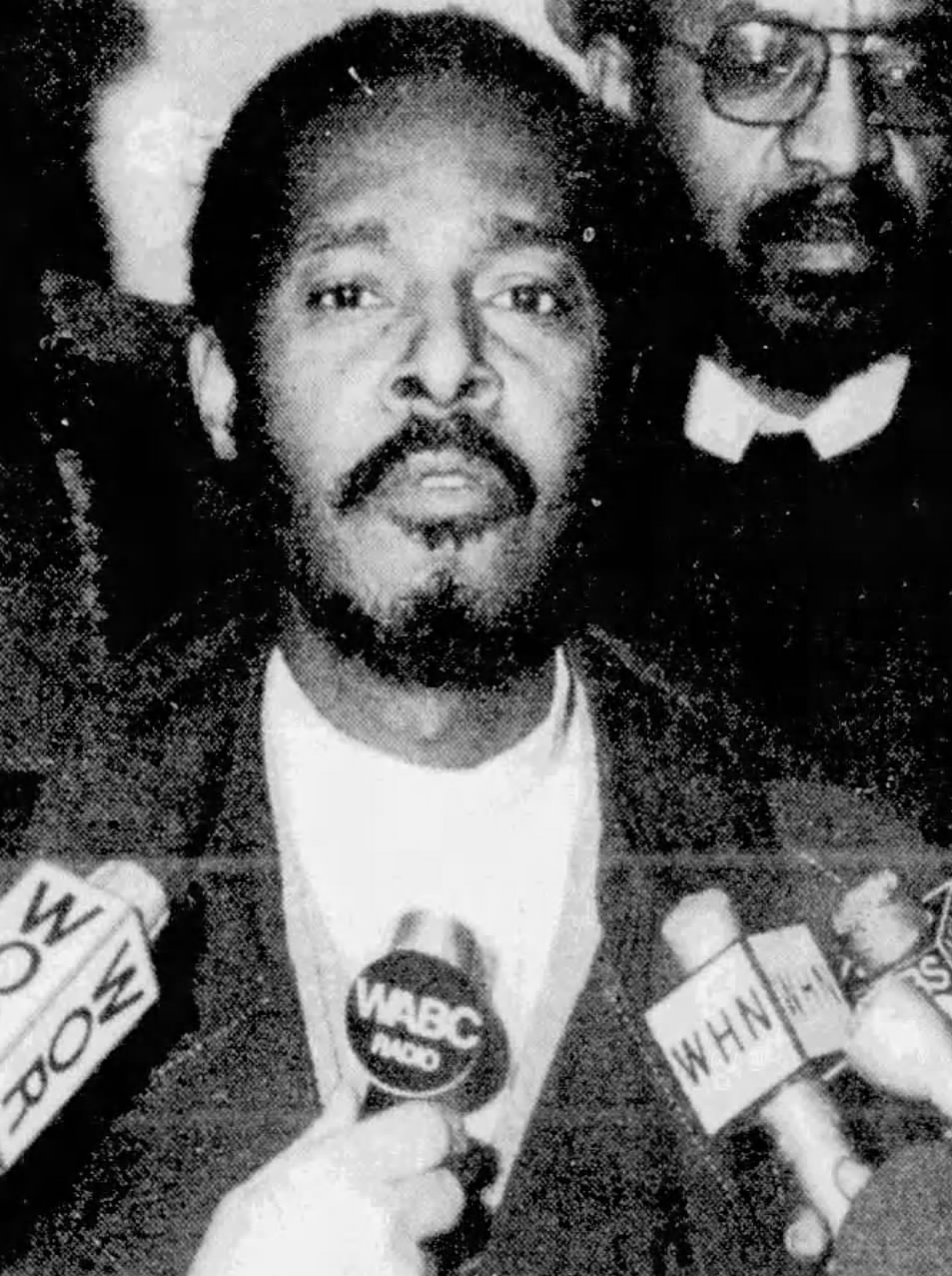
Daughtry (center) in 1977

Herbert Daughtry (born January 13, 1931) is an American pastor and community organizer. He is National Presiding Minister Emeritus of The House of the Lord Churches, which he headed from 1959 to 2019. He has been involved in community activism in New York City since the 1970s.

He began his activism in the 1950s. He was involved in the Southern Christian Leadership Conference's (SCLC) Operation Breadbasket. And he was involved in community control of schools in the latter 1960s. He has served as Chairman of the National Black United Front as well as Founder and President of the African People’s Christian Organization. He made a trip to Northern Ireland in the early 1980s in the wake of the 1980-1981 hunger strikes there.

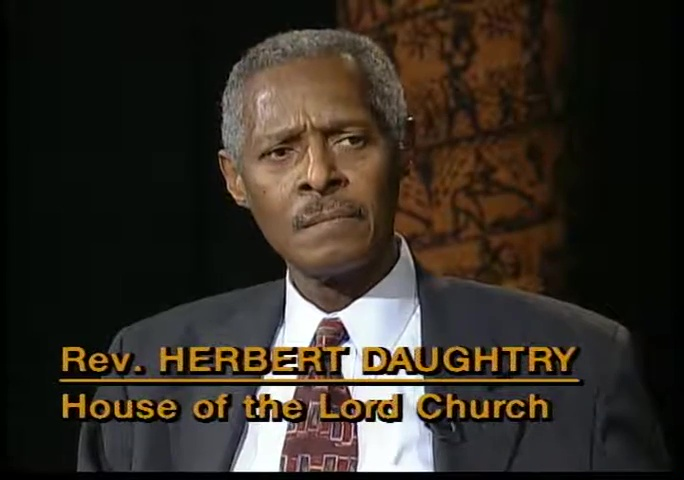
Daughtry on CUNY TV's African American Legends, 1998

Daughtry is a mentor of New York City mayor Eric Adams. In the 1970s, he encouraged Adams to become an officer in the NYPD, where he believed Adams could make change from within.

== Personal life ==
He is the father of Leah D. Daughtry.

In 2011, the Rev. Dr. Herbert D. Daughtry Learning Center, which oversees classes for children conducted at churches on weekends, opened in Jersey City, New Jersey.
