= Michael Maguire (ombudsman) =

Northern Irish public servant

Thomas Michael Maguire CBE is a Northern Irish public servant and former management consultant. Between July 2012 and July 2019, he served as the Police Ombudsman for Northern Ireland. He was previously the Chief Inspector of Criminal Justice in Northern Ireland (2008 to 2012). Before moving into public service, he worked as a management consultant with PA Consulting Group and was a Director of Price Waterhouse.

Maguire was appointed Commander of the Order of the British Empire (CBE) in the 2019 Birthday Honours.

Civic offices
Preceded by Al Hutchinson	Police Ombudsman for Northern Ireland; 2012 to 2019	Succeeded by Marie Anderson
