= Nuala O'Loan, Baroness O'Loan =

Public figure in Northern Ireland, Police Ombudsman and parliamentarian

The Right Honourable The Baroness O'Loan DBE MRIA
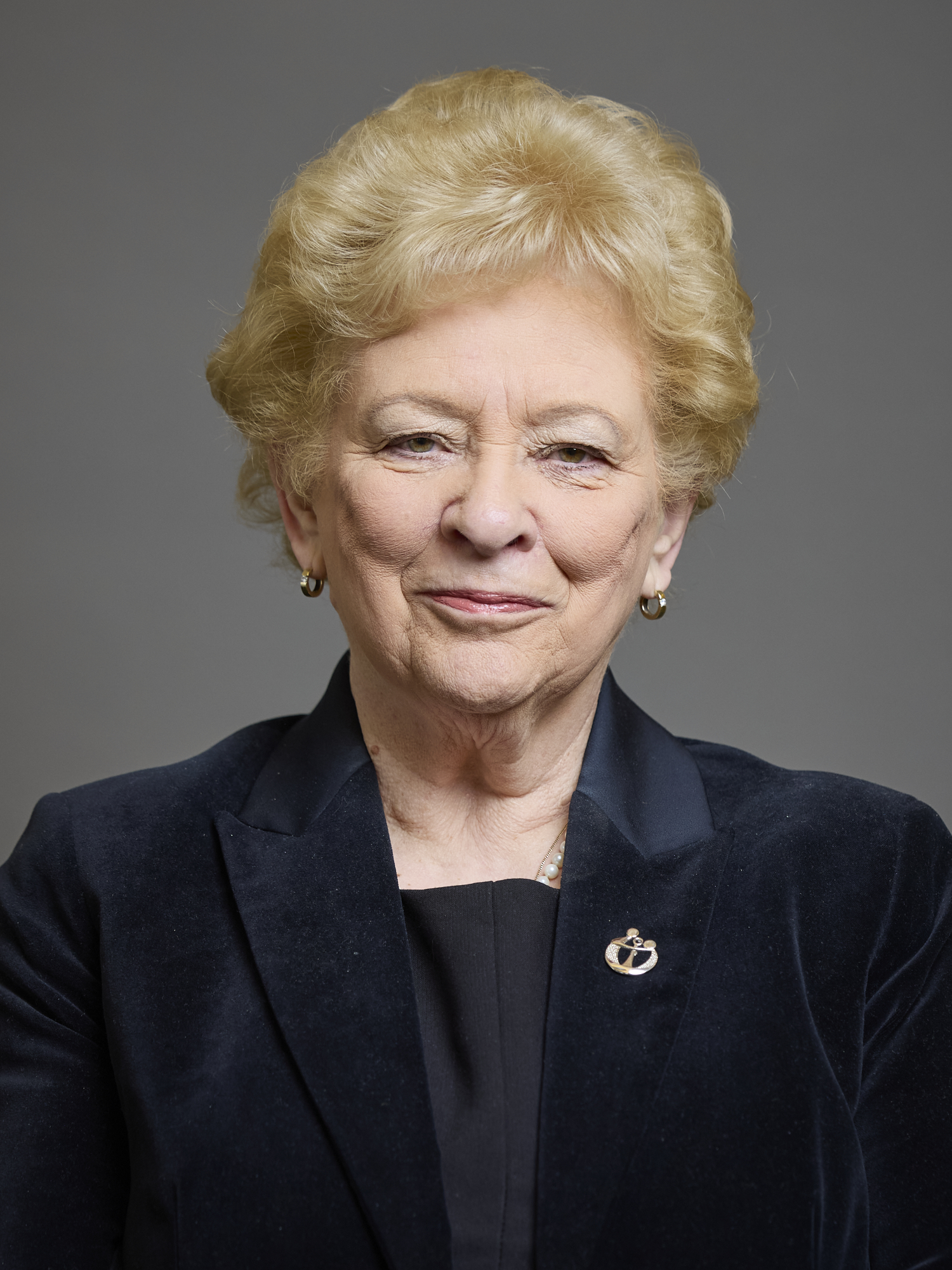
- Official portrait, 2024

Member of the House of Lords
- Lord Temporal
- Life peerage 11 September 2009

Personal details
- Born: Nuala Patricia O'Loan; 20 December 1951 (age 74) Hertfordshire, England
- Party: Crossbench
- Education: King's College London

Nuala Patricia O'Loan, Baroness O'Loan, DBE, MRIA (born 20 December 1951), is a public figure in Northern Ireland. From 1999 to 2007, she was the first Police Ombudsman for Northern Ireland. In July 2009, it was announced that she was to be appointed to the House of Lords and she was so appointed in September 2009. In December 2010, National University of Ireland, Maynooth, appointed her as the chairwoman of its governing authority. She is a columnist with The Irish Catholic.

== Background ==
O'Loan was born and educated in Hertfordshire, England, one of eight siblings. She studied law at King's College London, graduating in 1973, and became a law lecturer in Northern Ireland. In 1977 she survived an IRA bombing at Ulster Polytechnic, Jordanstown, while pregnant; she lost the baby as a result.

She is married to Social Democratic and Labour Party (SDLP) councillor and former North Antrim MLA, Declan O'Loan; they have five sons. In June 2006, one of her sons, Damian, was seriously wounded in the Oldpark section of North Belfast. The 23-year-old was left with serious head injuries and a broken arm after being attacked with an iron bar by a gang of four youths. The motive for the attack has not yet been established. She was a voluntary marriage counsellor, working particularly to prepare young people from different religions who are getting married.

Baroness O'Loan was appointed as latest chair of the Daniel Morgan inquiry in July 2014. Following the long gap after Stanley Burnton was forced to quit, Baroness O'Loan was made the new head of a long-running series of inquiries into the murder of the ex-private investigator and the subsequent police cover up.

== Previous career ==
O'Loan is a qualified solicitor and was a law lecturer at the Ulster Polytechnic and University of Ulster from 1974 to 1992. She was then a Senior Lecturer holding the Jean Monnet Chair in European Law at the University of Ulster from 1992 until her appointment as Ombudsman.

She has also been:

- Chairman of the Northern Ireland Consumer Committee for Electricity
- Member of the Police Authority
  - Vice-chair of the Police Authority's Community Relation Committee;
- Member of the Northern Health and Social Services Board
  - Convenor for Complaints for the Northern Health and Social Services Board
- Member of the General Consumer Council, and Convenor of the Transport and Energy Group of that Council
- Legal expert member of the European Commission's Consumers Consultative Council
- Member of the Green Economy Working Group
- Chair of the Equality and Human Rights Commission's Human Rights Enquiry

== Independent custody visitor (formerly known as "lay visitor") ==
For seven years, she was an independent custody visitor ("lay visitor") to police stations, which meant she could speak to people being detained, at any time of the day or night.

== Career as ombudsman ==
O'Loan was appointed by Her Majesty's Government to the post of Police Ombudsman designate in 1999. The Ombudsman's Office was created by the Police (Northern Ireland) Act 1998 (c. 32). This reform came into force some two weeks prior to the Belfast Agreement and the office's existence and practice has been the subject of continued controversy since. In August 2001, she was tasked with looking into police handling of the Omagh bombing in 1998. This attack killed 29 people (and 2 unborn children). Her report, published in December 2001, found that the Royal Ulster Constabulary had prior knowledge of some form of attack planned for that area and it questioned the leadership of Northern Ireland's then Chief Constable, Sir Ronnie Flanagan.

Responding to the report, Flanagan said he considered the report to represent neither a "fair, thorough or rigorous investigation". He said he was considering legal action on a "personal and organisational basis". An application for a High Court judicial review of the report was made by the Police Association trade union in 2002 and withdrawn in 2003.

He further added: "I consider it to be a report of an erroneous conclusion reached in advance and then a desperate attempt to find anything that might happen to fit in with that, and a determination to exclude anything which does not fit that erroneous conclusion". Flanagan said that if he believed the allegations in the report had been true "I would not only resign, I would publicly commit suicide."

O'Loan attracted both praise and criticism for her robust activity in investigating alleged abuses by officers in the Police Service of Northern Ireland (PSNI). She has also served as a trusted intermediary in controversial cases involving alleged criminal activity by Irish Republicans. This role came about because many Republicans did not yet recognise the PSNI as a legitimate and unbiased police service, and so refused to co-operate in its investigations. This role has largely disappeared as Sinn Féin have now called upon republicans to assist the PSNI.

A UK House of Commons Committee reported on the Police Ombudsman in 2005 and praised O'Loan, recommending that she be given wider powers. The same committee acknowledged that the Office was not seen as impartial by the PSNI and its officers and urged that these concerns be addressed. In December 2006, an independent survey by the Northern Ireland Statistics and Research Agency found that Protestants and Catholics are equally supportive of the Police Ombudsman. More than four out of five people questioned from both communities also believed that police officers and complainants would be treated fairly. In addition, a survey of police officers investigated by the Police Ombudsman's Office, suggests 85% believe they have been treated fairly by the office.

On 26 June 2007 former RCMP Assistant Commissioner Al Hutchinson was announced as the successor to O'Loan as Police Ombudsman, and he took up the office on 5 November 2007.

== Controversy ==
Former Ulster Unionist MP Ken Maginnis said, in relation to her handling of the Omagh Bomb Inquiry, that it was as though she had walked through "police interests and community interests like a suicide bomber". Former Secretary of State Peter Mandelson said she has displayed a "certain lack of experience and possibly gullibility" in relation to the same affair.

During the summer of 2006 her youngest son Ciarán, 18, was allegedly involved in an altercation with police in his home town. The PSNI officers involved were alleged to have manufactured false statements in relation to the matter, and later reversed the decision without comment.

In October 2006 she was involved in a public row with Ian Paisley Jr. The incident happened in a Belfast coffee shop when Paisley was approached by O'Loan. She voiced her concerns on alleged comments made by Paisley about her children. Her marriage to a nationalist Social Democratic and Labour Party (SDLP) councillor has, in the past, caused Paisley to question her ability to remain independent. Upon her retirement, a farewell party was organised, to which all political parties were invited. However, no representatives from the Ulster Unionist Party, Democratic Unionist Party or Sinn Féin attended. In August 2008 O'Loan while being interviewed on BBC Radio 4's Woman's Hour caused controversy by reportedly claiming that Protestants in Northern Ireland were brought up not to trust Catholics.

== Awards ==
In 2003, the Annual Conference of the National Association for Civilian Oversight of Law Enforcement (a US organisation) presented O'Loan with an award for her contribution to police accountability. In 2008 Dame Nuala was made Person of the Year at Ireland's Annual People of the Year Awards. On 3 July 2008, Dame Nuala was awarded an honorary Doctor of Laws (LLD) by the University of Ulster in recognition of her work as Police Ombudsman and for her contribution to the social development of Northern Ireland.

In 2008 O'Loan was awarded an honorary Doctorate of Laws by the Higher Education and Technical Awards Council, Ireland. That same year, she was also awarded an honorary Doctorate of Laws by the National University of Ireland, Maynooth. In 2010, she was awarded an honorary Doctorate of Laws by Queen's University Belfast. In 2012, she was elected a member of the Royal Irish Academy (MRIA).

== Operation Ballast investigation into collusion ==
On 22 January 2007 she published the results of Operation Ballast, an investigation into collusion between the Royal Ulster Constabulary and the Ulster Volunteer Force in relation to the murder of Raymond McCord Jr., in 1997.

Several crimes committed by informants working for Special Branch were investigated, including the killings of:

- Raymond McCord, Junior
- Peter McTasney
- Sharon McKenna
- Sean McParland
- Gary Convie
- Eamon Fox
- Gerard Brady
- John Harbinson

== Damehood ==
She was appointed Dame Commander of the Order of the British Empire (DBE) on 29 December 2007 in the 2008 New Year Honours. She, along with the other recipients of 2008 New Year's Honours, were congratulated by First Minister Ian Paisley.

== Appointment to Timor-Leste ==
On 19 February 2008, O'Loan was appointed by the Irish Government as special envoy in Timor-Leste (East Timor). Foreign Affairs Minister Dermot Ahern announced the appointment of O'Loan during a two-day visit to the country.

== Peerage ==
On 11 September 2009, she was created a life peer as Baroness O'Loan, of Kirkinriola in the County of Antrim, and she was introduced in the House of Lords on 27 October 2009, where she sits on the crossbenches.

== National University of Ireland ==
In December 2010 it was announced that she was to be immediately appointed to Chairman of the Governing Authority by National University of Ireland, Maynooth.

== Daniel Morgan inquiry ==
In July 2014, it was announced that Baroness O'Loan would chair the inquiry into the 1987 murder of a private investigator Daniel Morgan. This followed the withdrawal of the previous chair Sir Stanley Burnton.

== See also ==
- List of Northern Ireland Members of the House of Lords

Civic offices
New title	Police Ombudsman for Northern Ireland; 1999 to 2007	Succeeded by Al Hutchinson
