= Teebane bombing =

1992 IRA attack in Northern Ireland

- Part of The Troubles
- Location: 54°39′43.2″N 6°57′28.8″W; Teebane Crossroads, County Tyrone, Northern Ireland
- Date: 17 January 1992; 17:00 (UTC)
- Attack type: Roadside bomb
- Deaths: 7 civilians 1 Royal Irish Rangers soldier
- Injuries: 4 civilians 2 UDR soldiers
- Perpetrator: Provisional IRA

The Teebane bombing (or Teebane massacre) took place on 17 January 1992, at a rural crossroads between Omagh and Cookstown in County Tyrone, Northern Ireland. A roadside bomb destroyed a van carrying 14 construction workers who had been repairing a British Army base in Omagh. Eight of the men were killed and the rest were wounded. Most were civilians, while one of those killed and two of the wounded were off-duty British soldiers. The Provisional Irish Republican Army (IRA) claimed responsibility, saying the workers were targeted because they were collaborating with the "forces of occupation".

As all of those killed were Protestants, some saw the bombing as a sectarian attack against their community. On 5 February, the loyalist Ulster Defence Association (UDA) retaliated by shooting dead five Catholics at a betting shop in Belfast.

== Background ==
Since the beginning of its campaign in 1970, the Provisional IRA had launched frequent attacks on British Army and Royal Ulster Constabulary (RUC) bases in Northern Ireland. In August 1985, it began targeting civilians who offered services to the security forces, particularly those employed to maintain and repair its bases. The first to be killed was Seamus McAvoy (46), a Catholic who was shot dead at his home in Dublin for selling portable buildings to the RUC.

In October 1990, the IRA launched three "proxy bomb" attacks. Three men who worked for the security forces were tied into cars loaded with explosives and ordered to drive to British Army checkpoints while their families were held at gunpoint. The bombs were then remotely detonated. Six soldiers and one of the drivers were killed in the first two attacks. A third proxy bomb was driven to Lisanelly British Army base in Omagh, but the main device failed to explode. An earlier attack had taken place on this barracks in January when an IRA bomb damaged the perimeter fence.

Between August 1985 and January 1992, the IRA killed 23 people who had been working for, or offering services to, the security forces. The IRA also alleged that some of those targeted had links with Ulster loyalist paramilitaries.

== Bombing ==
On the evening of 17 January 1992, the 14 construction workers left work at Lisanelly British Army base in Omagh. They were employees of Karl Construction, based in Antrim. They travelled eastward in a Ford Transit van towards Cookstown. When the van reached the rural Teebane Crossroads, just after 5 pm, IRA volunteers detonated a roadside bomb containing an estimated 600 pounds (270 kg) of home-made explosives in two plastic barrels. Later estimates reported a 1,500 pounds (680 kg) device. The blast was heard from at least ten miles away. It ripped through one side of the van, instantly killing the row of passengers seated there. The vehicle's upper part was torn asunder, and its momentum kept it tumbling along the road for 30 yards. Some of the bodies of the dead and injured were blown into the adjacent field and ditch. IRA volunteers had detonated the bomb from about 100 yards away using a command wire. A car travelling behind the van was damaged in the explosion, but the driver wasn't seriously injured. Witnesses reported hearing automatic gunfire immediately before the explosion.

Seven of the men were killed outright. They were William Gary Bleeks (25), Cecil James Caldwell (37), Robert Dunseath (25), David Harkness (23), John Richard McConnell (38), Nigel McKee (22) and Robert Irons (61). The van's driver, Oswald Gilchrist (44), died of his wounds in hospital four days later. Dunseath was a British soldier serving with the Royal Irish Rangers. The other six workers were badly injured; two of them members of the Ulster Defence Regiment (UDR). It was the deadliest conflict-related incident in Northern Ireland since 1988.

The IRA's East Tyrone Brigade claimed responsibility for the attack shortly after. It argued that the men were legitimate targets because they were "collaborators engaged in rebuilding Lisanelly barracks" and vowed that attacks on "collaborators" would continue. The IRA's statement said:

The IRA reiterates its long-standing call to those who continue to provide services or materials to the forces of occupation to desist immediately. Since 1985 the IRA has adopted a policy of taking military action aimed at ending Britain's cynical use of non-military personnel for the servicing and maintenance of British Crown Forces' bases and installations … for our part, we in the IRA will not tolerate a situation where military personnel are freed from essential services and maintenance tasks and then deployed where they can carry out wholesale repression within our community.

== Aftermath ==
Both unionist and Irish nationalist politicians condemned the attack. Sinn Féin president Gerry Adams, however, described the bombing as "a horrific reminder of the failure of British policy in Ireland". He added that it highlighted "the urgent need for an inclusive dialogue which can create a genuine peace process". British Prime Minister John Major visited Northern Ireland within days and promised more troops, pledging that the IRA would not change government policy.

In his book The Long War, Brendan O'Brien wrote:

In terms of IRA military strategy, the Teebane bomb was a 'success'. It struck with deadly ferocity and effect and would have been extremely intimidating to others contemplating taking jobs on bombed-out RUC and British Army buildings […] this bomb also served as a warning to loyalist paramilitaries who had carried out a succession of killings in Tyrone.

The Ulster Defence Association (UDA), a loyalist paramilitary group, retaliated for the bombing less than three weeks later. On 5 February, two masked men armed with an automatic rifle and revolver entered Sean Graham's betting shop on Ormeau Road, Belfast. The shop was in an Irish nationalist/republican area and was packed with customers at the time. The men fired indiscriminately at the customers, killing five Catholic civilians, before fleeing to a getaway car. The UDA claimed responsibility using the cover name "Ulster Freedom Fighters", ending its statement with "Remember Teebane". After the shootings, a cousin of one of those killed at Teebane visited the betting shop. He said: "I just don't know what to say but I know one thing – this is the best thing that's happened for the Provos [Provisional IRA] in this area in years. This is the best recruitment campaign they could wish for".

The Historical Enquiries Team investigated the bombing and released its report to the families of the victims. It found that the IRA unit had initially planned to carry out the attack on the morning of 17 January, but, due to fog, it was put off until the evening. Although suspects were arrested in the wake of the attack, nobody has been charged or convicted. Survivor Bobby O'Neill, who received serious injuries in the blast, told the RUC that as he lay injured on the ground, he had seen a "bearded man" appear at the scene. The man walked through the van's wreckage, showing no compassion or emotion as he gazed upon each of the bodies of the dead and injured, and made no attempt to help the wounded. O'Neill believed this man was one of the bombers and, the following month, helped the RUC to compile a photo-fit image of him which was then circulated to all RUC divisions, but never released to the public.

Karl Construction erected a granite memorial at the site of the attack, and a memorial service is held there each year. In January 2012, on the 20th anniversary of the attack, Democratic Unionist Party MLA, Trevor Clarke, whose brother-in-law Nigel McKee at age 22 was the youngest person killed, demanded that republicans provide the names of the IRA bombers. On the 30th anniversary, the victims' relatives again appealed for information to find those responsible.

== See also ==
- Ballygawley bus bombing
- Chronology of Provisional Irish Republican Army actions (1990–1999)
