= Police Ombudsman for Northern Ireland =

Public body on police complaints

Agency overview
- Formed: 6 November 2000
- Jurisdiction: Northern Ireland
- Headquarters: 11 Church St, Belfast
- Employees: 147 (2022/23)
- Annual budget: £13.4 million (2022/23)
- Agency executives: Jacqui Durkin, Police Ombudsman; Hugh Hume, Chief Executive
- Website: www.policeombudsman.org

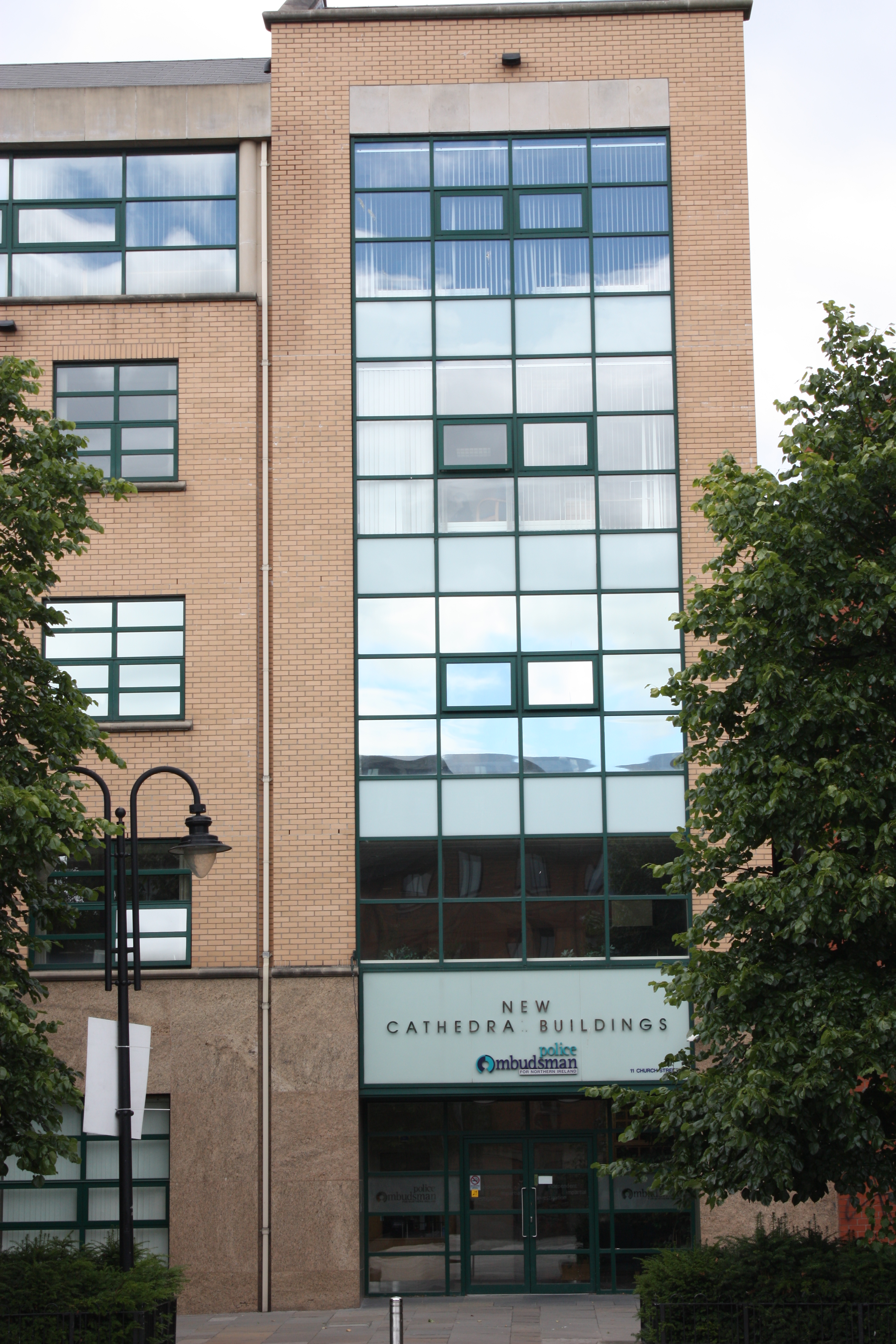
Police Ombudsman's Office, Belfast, July 2010

The Office of the Police Ombudsman for Northern Ireland (OPONI) is a non-departmental public body intended to provide an independent, impartial police complaints system for the people and police under the Police (Northern Ireland) Acts of 1998 and 2000.

== Office structure and legal remit ==
The law in Northern Ireland does not permit the police to investigate complaints made by members of the public about the conduct of police officers. These must be referred instead to the Police Ombudsman’s Office for independent investigation.

The office has a complement of around 150, about two thirds of whom are employed within the office’s investigative teams.

There are two main strands to the investigative work of the office – current and historical. Its current work involves dealing with complaints about the conduct of police officers during incidents which have occurred in the previous 12 months.

Legislation also permits the Police Ombudsman's Office to investigate matters involving police officers which he considers to be grave or exceptional, no matter when they took place. These are cases in which police officers may have been responsible for deaths or serious criminality. Complaints being dealt with by the office include those alleging police involvement in murder, attempted murder, as well as conspiracy and incitement to murder. Most of these historical cases relate to incidents during the conflict in Northern Ireland between 1968 and 1998 (commonly referred to as “The Troubles”).

Since opening on 6 November 2000, the office has dealt with between 2,800 and 3,600 complaints each year.

== Personnel ==
The Police Ombudsman is Jacqui Durkin, having previously served as the Chief Inspector of Criminal Justice in Northern Ireland from 2019 to 2026. Mrs Durkin's predecessor was Marie Anderson, who served as the Police Ombudsman from July 2019 to December 2025, having previously served as Northern Ireland Ombudsman (2016-2019). Mrs Anderson's predecessor was Michael Maguire, who previously served as Chief Inspector, Criminal Justice Inspectorate Northern Ireland (2008–12). Prior to that, Al Hutchinson, who had previously been Police Oversight Commissioner, took up office on 6 November 2007, and retired in January 2011 following a series of critical independent reports.

The first Ombudsman for Northern Ireland was Nuala O'Loan, whose seven-year term in office ended in November 2007. She has since been appointed a Dame Commander of the Order of the British Empire and was subsequently appointed to the House of Lords.

=== List of Police Ombudsmen ===
- 1999 to 2007: Nuala O'Loan
- 2007 to 2011: Al Hutchinson
- 2012 to 2019: Michael Maguire
- 2019 to 2025: Marie Anderson
- 2026 to present Jacqui Durkin

== See also ==
- List of Government departments and agencies in Northern Ireland
- Police Service of Northern Ireland
