= London Stock Exchange bombing =

1990 bombing of the London Stock Exchange by the Provisional IRA

Coordinates: 51°30′52″N 0°05′12″W

- Part of the Troubles
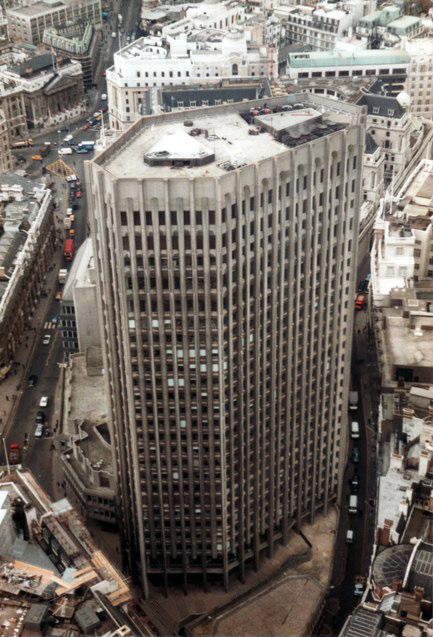
- The Stock Exchange Tower in 1983
- Location: Stock Exchange Tower, London, United Kingdom
- Date: 20 July 1990; 08:49 (UTC)
- Target: London Stock Exchange
- Attack type: Bomb
- Deaths: 0
- Injuries: 0
- Perpetrator: Provisional Irish Republican Army

The London Stock Exchange bombing occurred on the morning of 20 July 1990 with the explosion of a 5 to 10 lb (2.3 to 4.5 kg) bomb of high explosives inside the London Stock Exchange building in the City of London, England, planted by the Provisional IRA. The building and surroundings were evacuated after the IRA gave a telephone warning 40 minutes prior to the explosion, and thus nobody was wounded. But the bomb's strength blew a 10-foot hole inside the Stock Exchange Tower, and caused massive damage to the visitors' gallery on the first floor. The bomb was placed in the men's toilets behind the gallery. The gallery and public viewing area was forced to close in 1992.

== Background ==
The bombing came on the eighth anniversary of the 1982 Hyde Park and Regent's Park bombings which killed eleven people. The IRA launched a renewed campaign in London in 1990. During May, a soldier at an army recruiting centre was killed by a bomb in Wembley, whilst five were injured in a similar explosion in Eltham. In June 1990 bombs at the Honourable Artillery Company and the Carlton Club injured 19 and 20 people respectively.

== Investigation and aftermath ==
Scotland Yard's anti-terrorist chief George Churchill-Coleman said eight phone calls from the same man with an Irish accent were made between 8:02 am and 8:20 am to the City of London Police, the London Fire Brigade, Reuters, the Financial Times, the Salvation Army and the Stock Exchange itself.

The Stock Exchange's chairman however said after the attack "If the purpose of this callous act was to bring the City to a halt, they have failed singularly." The explosion had little impact on stock trading since that was being carried out by computers elsewhere. In 1992, the IRA bombed the Baltic Exchange building in the City.

== See also ==
- Chronology of Provisional Irish Republican Army actions (1990–1991)
- Baltic Exchange bombing
- Bishopsgate bombing
