= 1990 Wembley bombing =

1990 terrorist incident in London

- Part of the Troubles
- Location: Wembley, London, England
- Date: 16 May 1990; 17:15 (UTC)
- Attack type: Bomb
- Deaths: 1
- Injuries: 4
- Perpetrator: Provisional Irish Republican Army

The Provisional IRA (IRA) planted a bomb underneath a minibus at an army recruiting centre in Wembley, northwest London on 16 May 1990, killing a soldier and injuring four others. The dead victim was the van's driver, 34-year-old Sergeant Charles Chapman from the Queen's Regiment, a father of two. The injured included his colleague, who got shrapnel wounds to his legs and right shoulder, and a burned face. The bomb was believed to have been 2 lb (910 g) of Semtex and shattered nearby windows when it exploded around 5:15 pm. The van was an unmarked white Leyland Sherpa (registration G466 AGX) parked in an alleyway behind the office, which was checked by the two soldiers beforehand but the bomb was cleverly hidden, and detonated as Chapman turned on the ignition. The bomb could have caused more casualties had it exploded later when the van entered the busy street.

Police were looking for a suspect on a motorbike, but no one was ever convicted of Chapman's murder. The next day the IRA claimed responsibility in a statement from Dublin: "While the British government persists in its continued occupation of the north of Ireland, the IRA will persist in attacking the British government and its forces in England". Five days prior, the IRA bombed the Royal Army Educational Corps headquarters in Eltham which injured five civilians. The attacks were part of the start of a new bombing campaign in London.

Chapman is buried at Darlington Crematorium.

== See also ==
- Chronology of Provisional Irish Republican Army actions (1990–1991)
- 1990 Eltham bombing
- Deal barracks bombing
- Inglis Barracks bombing
- Honourable Artillery Company bombing
