= Musgrave Park Hospital bombing =

1991 IRA attack in Belfast, Northern Ireland

- Part of The Troubles and Operation Banner
- Musgrave Park Hospital military wing gutted by the explosion

- Location: 54°34′03″N 5°58′37″W; Ballygammon, Belfast, County Antrim, Northern Ireland
- Date: 2 November 1991; 4:35PM (GMT)
- Target: Military wing of the Hospital
- Attack type: Bombing
- Deaths: 2 British soldiers
- Injuries: 9 British soldiers 2 Civilians
- Perpetrator: Provisional IRA

On 2 November 1991, a bomb planted by the Provisional IRA exploded in the Military Wing at Musgrave Park Hospital, Belfast. Two British soldiers were killed and nine others were wounded. Two children, a five-year-old girl and a baby of four months, were also injured by the blast.

== Background ==
Paramilitary attacks in hospital grounds were not unknown during The Troubles in Northern Ireland. In May 1976, a British soldier, member of a liaison team from the Royal Anglian Regiment, was seriously injured when an Irish National Liberation Army (INLA) gunman opened fire in a corridor in the Royal Victoria Hospital, Belfast. One of the five shots fired also hit a male nurse. On 28 October 1976, Ulster Freedom Fighters (UUF) militants shot and killed former Sinn Féin vice-president Máire Drumm at Mater Hospital in Belfast, while she was recovering from an eye operation. A former British soldier working as security guard colluded with the killers. In March 1977 a booby-trap bomb exploded in the vicinity of Royal Victoria Hospital's sports complex as three Royal Ulster Constabulary (RUC) officers passed although none were injured; a week earlier the IRA had claimed that the British Army was using part of the hospital grounds for surveillance work. The 2 November 1991 attack was believed to be the first time a hospital had been the intended target of an attack, rather than an incident involving specific individuals.

== Bombing ==
On 2 November 1991, a Provisional IRA active service unit infiltrated a service tunnel connecting the Withers block, containing orthopaedic and children's wards and the Military Wing, and planted a device containing 20 lb (9.1 kg) of Semtex against steel security doors. The bomb exploded in the afternoon, being located directly beneath an operating theatre. The blast caused extensive damage to the building with walls buckled outwards and part of a staircase collapsing. Several small fires were also ignited. Initially it was thought there had been a gas leak. Two soldiers were killed (Phil Cross, Royal Army Medical Corps, Craig Pantry, Royal Corps of Transport) and 11 other people were injured, among them 9 members of the Army Medical Service, a five-year-old girl and a baby of four months. Many of the dead and injured were watching a rugby match on television in the Military Wing's social club. The children's ward and a creche were within a hundred yards of the military complex and children had to be evacuated after broken glass made their ward uninhabitable.

== Aftermath ==
As well as the deaths and injuries, the blast from the explosion caused severe damage to both the Military Wing and the newly refurbished children's ward in the Withers block. At least 97 operations due to have been performed that week were cancelled, 80 out of the 200 patient beds in the hospital were rendered unusable, and the damage totalling at least £250,000 (equivalent to £574,989 in 2025).

The bombing was widely condemned and intensified growing calls for the re-introduction of internment without trial from Unionist politicians and some senior figures of the British Army and Royal Ulster Constabulary in Northern Ireland. Northern Ireland's Deputy Chief Ambulance officer Tom McKee called the attack "deplorable". The Irish Minister for Foreign Affairs Gerry Collins said of the bombing: "An attack against a hospital must be regarded as a particularly heinous violation of the most basic standards of human decency."

== See also ==
- Chronology of Provisional Irish Republican Army actions (1990–1991)
- Glenanne barracks bombing – 1991 IRA attack in Northern Ireland
- Teebane bombing – 1992 IRA attack in Northern Ireland
