= Chronology of Provisional Irish Republican Army actions (1990–1991) =

This is a chronology of activities by the Provisional Irish Republican Army (IRA), in 1990 and 1991.

== 1990 ==
=== January–February ===
- 2 January 1990:
  - Ulster loyalist Harry Dickey, a member of the Ulster Defence Association (UDA) and Ulster Democratic Party, was killed by a Provisional IRA booby trap bomb attached to his car outside his home, Larkfield Manor, Sydenham, East Belfast.
  - an IRA unit threw a blast bomb at a Royal Ulster Constabulary (RUC) base in Stewartstown, County Tyrone.
- 3 January 1990:
  - an Ulster Defence Regiment (UDR) soldier was seriously injured in an IRA under-car booby trap bomb attack in Magherafelt, County Londonderry.
  - two British soldiers were injured after a device exploded behind a garden wall in Ardoyne, North Belfast.
- 4 January 1990:
  - a British soldier was slightly injured by an explosive device off New Lodge Road, North Belfast.
  - an explosive device was thrown at a joint British Army-RUC mobile patrol at Springfield Road, west Belfast.
- 5 January 1990: several shots were fired and a blast bomb thrown at Antrim Road RUC base, Belfast.
- 9 January 1990:
  - a UDR soldier (Olven Kilpatrick) was shot dead by the IRA on Main Street, Castlederg, County Tyrone. In a follow-up operation, two RUC officers were injured by a bomb left by the IRA unit.
  - the IRA claimed responsibility for a 25 lb (11 kg) anti-personnel bomb defused by the British Army at Hazelwood, Poleglass, Belfast. The IRA claimed they had aborted the operation because of the presence of civilians.
- 10 January 1990:
  - the IRA detonated a bomb hidden in a derelict house by command wire as a British Army patrol passed in Stratheden Street in the New Lodge area of Belfast, injuring two soldiers.
  - an IRA unit threw two blast bombs at a three-vehicle British Army-RUC convoy on the Springfield Road, Belfast. The IRA claimed to have scored hits on two of vehicles.
- 11 January 1990:
  - a part-time UDR soldier escaped injury after he discovered a bomb under his car which was subsequently destroyed when the device exploded in Maghera, County Londonderry.
  - four companies were forced by IRA threats to issue public statements that they would not supply contractors working for British security forces in Northern Ireland.
  - an IRA unit threw a blast bomb into the RUC station in Randalstown, County Antrim.
  - an IRA unit threw a blast bomb into the RUC station in Toomsbridge, County Antrim.
- 12 January 1990:
  - a bomb caused minor damage to a restaurant on the Lisburn Road, Belfast.
  - petrol bombs were thrown at the RUC base at Coalisland, County Tyrone.
- 13 January 1990: a 150 lb (68 kg) bomb caused some damage to the perimeter fence at Lisanelly Barracks, Omagh, County Tyrone.
- 15 January 1990: a 1,000 lb (450 kg) bomb destroyed Sion Mills RUC station. Several homes were extensively damaged, although there were no injuries. A second 1,000 lb (450 kg) van bomb, targeting security forces driving to the scene of the first along the Sion Mills road, was defused after failing to detonate.
- 16 January 1990: the IRA was blamed for two letter bombs defused at Aldershot Garrison in Aldershot, England, both addressed to senior British Army officers.
- 17 January 1990: the IRA detonated a car bomb in the multi-storey car park of the Victoria Shopping Centre on Chichester Street, Belfast.
- 18 January 1990:
  - a 2 lb (0.91 kg) Semtex bomb was discovered under an RUC Reserve officer's car in East Belfast. A man and a woman were arrested afterwards. A third person was also charged.
  - an attack on a member of the British security forces was apparently foiled after a revolver and 3.3 lb (1.5 kg) of Semtex explosives was found ready in Cookstown, County Tyrone.
- 20 January 1990:
  - the IRA carried out a mortar attack on the RUC/British Army base at Newtownhamilton, County Armagh. One unexploded projectile landed within the compound, another on civilian property.
  - a UDR soldier was seriously injured when a bomb exploded under his car outside his parents' home at Plumbridge, County Tyrone.
- 21 January 1990: an IRA unit opened fire on a British Army mobile patrol and an observation post in the New Lodge area of Belfast. There were no reported casualties.
- 22 January 1990:
  - RUC Inspector Derek Monteith was shot dead by an IRA unit in Kilburn Park, Armagh town. Up to 30 rounds were fired through his kitchen door, hitting him five times in the head, neck and body.
  - the IRA planted a 25 lb (11 kg) bomb in a snooker hall adjoining Queen Street RUC station in Belfast city centre. The bomb was discovered and defused by the British Army.
- 27 January 1990:
  - a bomb was found under the car of DUP councillor Paul McLean in Magherafelt, County Londonderry. The IRA said he was targeted because he worked for a firm which supplied the British security forces.
  - a 500 lb (230 kg) IRA van bomb damaged an RUC station in Lisbellaw, County Fermanagh.
- 28 January 1990: a civilian (Charles Love) was killed when he was hit by debris when an IRA bomb exploded on Derry's walls during a Bloody Sunday march. The security forces described his death as a "freak accident" as he was a quarter of a mile from the bomb, which was targeting security forces. Love was a member of Republican Youth. He is commemorated at a Sinn Féin-organised march in his home town of Strabane each year.
- 2 February 1990:
  - an IRA bomb exploded in a CastleCourt shopping complex in Belfast city centre causing minor damage. It was the fourth bomb attack at the premises in two years.
  - an IRA bomb threat caused disruption on the Dublin-Belfast railway line.
  - a bomb attached to the underside of a car belonging to a member of the security forces was spotted by its owner in Castlederg, County Tyrone.
  - a woman and her daughter were held hostage in their by armed men claiming to represent the IRA in the Shantallow area of Derry.
  - a single shot was fired at a British Army foot patrol near Stewartstown, County Tyrone. Soldiers returned fire but there were no reported injuries.
- 4 February 1990: a bomb attached to the underside of a building contractor's car in Portadown, County Armagh exploded prematurely during gale-force winds. Nearby houses were damaged but no reported injuries.
- 6 February 1990: a part-time RUC Reserve officer was seriously injured by a bomb hidden in a hay shed on his farm at Lack, County Fermanagh.
- 7 February 1990:
  - a car bomb exploded in Waring Street, near Belfast city centre.
  - the Short Brothers factory was damaged by a bomb. The IRA warned that they would not leave any warnings for further attacks on the factory. In a further statement issued on 10 February the IRA reversed this decision and indicated they would continue to issue warnings.
  - the IRA detonated a large Semtex shrapnel bomb as a British Army mobile patrol passed on the Monagh bypass in the Turf Lodge area of Belfast.
- 8 February 1990: an IRA attack was foiled after British security forces found and defused a "ready" 600 lb (270 kg) van bomb at a farm near Lurgan, County Armagh.
- 11 February 1990:
  - three British soldiers were injured when their Gazelle helicopter was shot down after being hit by machine-gun fire from an IRA unit on a border area south of Clogher, County Tyrone (see:1990 British Army Gazelle shootdown).
  - a 1 lb (0.45 kg) Semtex booby-trap bomb attached to the underside of a car was defused in Portrush, County Antrim.
- 16 February 1990:
  - an off-duty UDR soldier was shot and injured as he drove a tractor at Drummanor Forest Park off the Cookstown-Omagh road, County Tyrone.
  - an attack was foiled in the Oakman Street area of the Falls Road, Belfast, after British security forces uncovered a primed shrapnel bomb with a command wire. Several arrests were made afterwards.
- 17 February 1990:
  - a booby-trap bomb targeting RUC officers left in a derelict house in the St James' area of Belfast was defused.
  - a car bomb caused extensive damage to a hotel on Black's Road in south Belfast.
  - two British soldiers were injured by a 700 lb (320 kg) landmine in the Dunmurry area of Belfast.
- 19 February 1990: the IRA detonated a 2 lb (0.91 kg) Semtex bomb by command wire as a joint British Army-RUC patrol approached in Mizen Gardens, Belfast.
- 20 February 1990:
  - the IRA bombed a British military recruitment office in Leicester, England. Two people were injured.
  - a van and a car driven by an IRA unit carrying light machine guns were spotted by a British Wessex helicopter near Newtownhamilton, South Armagh. The IRA unit split up in several vehicles, but one of the cars was pinpointed by the aircraft, and three IRA volunteers were arrested by a party of three soldiers and two RUC officers after landing from their helicopter in Silverbridge. Afterwards, a crowd of 40 civilians attacked the security forces, allowing the escape of the three IRA men. A number of automatic weapons were confiscated in the aftermath by the RUC, among them two light machine guns.
  - an IRA booby-trap bomb disguised as a brick in a wall was defused by the British Army on the Ballymurphy Road, West Belfast.
  - an IRA unit fired several shots at British soldiers in the vicinity of Woodbourne RUC station, Belfast.
- 21 February 1990: a single mortar mounted in a tractor was fired at Kinawley RUC station. An explosion was reported in the area, although it's unclear whether the projectile hit the base.
- 23 February 1990: a bomb exploded in Newry train station, demolishing a ticket booth and severing part of the railway line, as delegates from the Irish Congress of Trade Unions (ICTU) were travelling to the organisation's annual women's conference. A civilian was forced at gunpoint to drive the bomb to the site, while the other passengers were held hostage for several hours.
- 24 February 1990:
  - a 2 lb (0.91 kg) Semtex booby-trap bomb attached to the underside of a car belonging to a member of the security forces was defused after falling from the vehicle outside a social club in Cookstown, County Tyrone.
  - an incendiary bomb caused "minor" damage to a newly opened hardware chain store at Lisnagelvin in Derry. The IRA denied responsibility and alleged "Loyalist racketeers" were behind the attack.
  - a 90 lb (41 kg) bomb partially exploded in the foyer of the Slieve Donard Hotel, County Down, during an ICTU conference. It was suspected the attack, and another the previous day, were linked to an ICTU protest campaign against IRA bomb attacks on the Dublin-Belfast railway. The IRA denied any knowledge of the ICTU conference and claimed the hotel was targeted for serving members of British security forces.
  - an IRA unit fired twenty shots at Woodbourne RUC station, Belfast. There were no reported injuries. The following day the IRA claimed the attack was a warning to contractors carrying out work on the base.
- 25 February 1990: the IRA bombed a British Army recruitment office in Halifax, West Yorkshire.

=== March–April ===
- 1 March 1990: British security forces foiled an IRA attack after seizing an RPG-7 launcher and automatic rifle in a car in the Creggan area of Derry, shortly after detaining an armed man in a house nearby. Several arrests were made.
- 4 March 1990: a 10-man IRA unit attacked an RUC station in Stewartstown, County Tyrone, using an improvised flamethrower consisting of a manure-spreader towed by a tractor to spray 600 imperial gallons (2,700 L) of a petrol/diesel mix to engulf the base in flames, and then opened fire with rifles and an RPG-7 rocket launcher. The next day the IRA threatened any contractor who took on repair of the station.
- 8 March 1990: an off-duty UDR soldier, Thomas Jamison, was shot dead by the IRA at Tullynure, near Donaghmore, County Tyrone. He was driving a lorry for a building firm which was contracted to the British Army. A three-man IRA unit attacked the lorry with a grenade and fired over 30 shots into the cab.
- 12 March 1990: the IRA claimed to have abandoned a bomb around Pembroke Loop in the Poleglass area of Belfast. The British Army dealt with the suspect device.
- 15 March 1990: several shots were fired at a joint British Army/RUC patrol at Brackaville Road, Coalisland.
- 16 March 1990:
  - the first use of the Barret M82 sniper rifle in Northern Ireland by the South Armagh sniper teams. A British soldier suffered minor head injures when a bullet pierced his helmet on Castleblaney Road, County Armagh.
  - an IRA ambush involving a 25 lb (11 kg) command wire-detonation bomb in the Creggan area of Derry was foiled by British security forces, who had been lured to the area by an "elaborate" hoax bomb alert.
  - a drogue bomb was lobbed at an RUC mobile patrol in the Shantallow area of Derry. There were no reported injuries.
- 17 March 1990:
  - an RUC patrol foiled a bomb attack in Coalisland, County Tyrone. One man was arrested and a 200 lb (91 kg) bomb was recovered. RUC officers fired plastic bullets after a mob attacked as the device was being defused.
- 18 March 1990: a bomb exploded on West Street in Stewartstown, County Tyrone.
- 20 March 1990: two bombs exploded at the Short Brothers missile factory in the Castlereagh area of Belfast, damaging a new heavy fuel tanker installation. Four workers were treated for shock.
- 22 March 1990: a taxi driver was forced to drive a 350 lb (160 kg) bomb to an RUC station in Cookstown, County Tyrone. The device was defused.
- 24 March 1990:
  - two bombs – 2 lb (0.91 kg) and 90 lb (41 kg) of explosives – were detonated after British security forces had been lured by a hoax call to a petrol station on the Buncrana Road, Derry. There were no reported injuries.
  - a gun battle erupted between an IRA unit and undercover British forces at Cappagh, County Tyrone, when a civilian-type vehicle driven by an undercover agent was fired on by IRA volunteers without warning, according to Archie Hamilton, then Secretary of State for Defence. Hamilton stated that there were no casualties, although the IRA was adamant it had killed two undercover British soldiers.
  - a 1.5 lb (0.68 kg) Semtex bomb was found detached in a car park at a social club in Cookstown. The device was defused.
- 25 March 1990:
  - a 1,000 lb (450 kg) IRA van bomb exploded in front of the RUC base in Ballymena, County Antrim.
  - an IRA van bomb exploded at the RUC base in Castlederg, County Tyrone. An RUC officer and four civilians were injured.
- 28 March 1990:
  - an off-duty RUC officer (George Starrett) was shot dead by an IRA unit at his home on Newry Road, Armagh town, when a burst of shots were fired through his kitchen window.
  - an IRA unit fired on a British Army patrol as it left Henry Taggart Barracks in the Ballymurphy area of Belfast.
- 29 March 1990:
  - a 200 lb (91 kg) IRA bomb extensively damaged Tennent Street RUC station in Belfast.
  - RUC vehicles were fired upon in three separate incidents in Belfast at Tennant's Street, Oldpark Road, and Oldpark Avenue following the interception of a hoax bomb.
  - an IRA unit fired several shots at Donegall Pass RUC station, Belfast.
- 2 April 1990:
  - a 500 lb (230 kg) IRA van bomb was defused by a controlled explosion outside Fort George British Army base in Derry.
  - after luring British security forces to hoax car bombs at Springfield Road and Springfield Parade, IRA units opened fire on Whiterock and Broadway Tower security forces bases.
- 6 April 1990:
  - an IRA unit fired several shots at contractors carrying out work at the British Army installation in Bishop Street, Derry.
  - an IRA Semtex bomb concealed in a bus shelter on the outskirts of Pomeroy, County Tyrone, was defused by the British Army.
- 8 April 1990:
  - a 1,000 lb (450 kg) bomb, disguised as an RUC patrol vehicle, was driven into Musgrave Street RUC station, Belfast. The device was defused by the British Army.
  - three 12 lb (5.4 kg) IRA bombs planted at a non-military radio communications mast outside Roslea, County Fermanagh, were defused by British security forces.
- 9 April 1990:
  - four UDR soldiers (Michael Adams, John Birch, John Bradley, Steven Smart) were killed when the IRA detonated a landmine under their patrol vehicle on Ballydugan Road, Downpatrick, County Down. The landmine contained over 1,000 lb (450 kg) of explosive and was so powerful that the vehicle was blown into a nearby field. See: 1990 Downpatrick roadside bomb
  - the British Army defused an 80 lb (36 kg) van bomb in vicinity of Grosvenor Road RUC station, Belfast.
- 10 April 1990: an IRA unit threw a grenade at a British Army patrol as they exited Henry Taggart Barracks in the Ballymurphy area of Belfast.
- 12 April 1990: two 10 lb (4.5 kg) bombs exploded at the CastleCourt shopping centre in Belfast a week before it opened, coinciding with a media launch.
- 16 April 1990: the IRA shot dead Irish People's Liberation Organisation (IPLO) volunteer Eoin Morley in Newry. He was dragged from his girlfriend's house and shot twice in the back. The IRA released a statement claiming Morley had joined the IPLO "contrary to IRA Standing Orders" and as well as involved in criminal activity had also passed on information to the IPLO leading to the seizure of IRA arms dumps, but later apologised for the killing, claiming they had received false information.
- 20 April 1990: a 1,000 lb (450 kg) IRA bomb, camouflaged behind a wall close to a reservoir in Creggan Estate, Derry, was defused by the British Army. The IRA stated the device had been disarmed a fortnight previously because of the presence of civilians.
- 22 April 1990: an IRA unit fired a rocket-propelled grenade at a British Army mobile patrol on the Monagh bypass in the Turf Lodge area of Belfast. Several shots were fired as they escaped the scene. The IRA claimed to have scored a direct hit, but this was denied by the RUC.
- 25 April 1990: the IRA reported two Volunteers fired forty shots at contractors and British soldiers at the checkpoint at Coshquin on the outskirts of Derry. The RUC denied any incident occurred.
- 26 April 1990: several homes were damaged after mortar shells destined for an RUC station exploded prematurely in their launchers in Portadown, County Armagh.
- 27 April 1990: a British Army contractor (Kenneth Graham), was killed by the IRA when he triggered a booby-trap bomb attached to his car in Kilkeel, County Down.
- 28 April 1990:
  - the IRA claimed responsibility for hoax bombs in Newry, County Down, Fintona, County Tyrone, and Moy, County Tyrone.
  - a bomb was detonated inside a lamp post in Sloan Street, Lisburn, as British soldiers investigated a warning about a car containing a 200 lb (91 kg) bomb. The car bomb was later defused.
  - an IRA mortar launcher detonated prematurely, slight damaging a military checkpoint in Strabane, County Tyrone.
  - a British soldier was shot and wounded in the leg when an IRA unit fired a heavy machine gun at an observation post near Cullyhanna, County Armagh.
  - a seventeen-year-old girl was arrested for being in possession of a Semtex bomb after a bus travelling to Aldergrove International Airport outside Belfast was stopped and searched by British security forces.
  - an IRA mortar attack failed when the devices exploded prematurely in their launcher on Culmore Road, Derry.
  - British Army experts defused a 900 lb (410 kg) bomb found in a housing estate in Dungannon, County Tyrone. Residents heard a muffled explosion shortly after alerting security forces.
- 29 April 1990:
  - a bomb exploded at a border post at Newry. The IRA later said two devices that failed to explode remained in the area.
  - motorists drove over unexploded drogue bombs on the Newcastle Road in Castlewellan, County Down. The devices were later made safe by the British Army.

=== May–June ===
- 1 May 1990: Gardaí foiled an IRA bank robbery in Enniscorthy, County Wexford. One man was seriously wounded.
- 2 May 1990:
  - a bomb exploded under a landrover in Lisburn Territorial Army base, seriously injuring a civilian employee who had been working on the vehicle. Six other people were also hurt in the blast.
  - Strand Road RUC base in Derry was hit by a mortar, although no injuries were reported.
- 4 May 1990: a civilian security guard foiled an IRA bomb attack on British Army quarters in the Langenhagen barracks in Hannover, West Germany. Three men had penetrated the perimeter fence carrying two Semtex devices. The IRA unit reportedly fired a number of shots before escaping.
- 6 May 1990: a British soldier was shot dead when an IRA unit launched an attack on a British Army foot patrol near Cullyhanna, County Armagh. The patrol had become suspicious of a derelict building after seeing smoke coming from the chimney on a hot day. As they approached they came under heavy machine gun fire and one soldier was shot in the head. Lance Sergeant Graham Stewart died of his wounds the following day. The patrol was airlifted to safety (see Operation Conservation).
- 8 May 1990: the British Army defused a bomb left by the IRA in the CastleCourt shopping complex in Belfast.
- 11 May 1990: an IRA unit threw a drogue bomb at RUC mobile patrol as it passed through the Duncairn Gardens area of North Belfast. A vehicle was damaged although the RUC officers inside narrowly escaped injury.
- 12 May 1990: the IRA detonated an incendiary device by command wire as an RUC vehicle passed the Rath roundabout in the Creggan area of Derry.
- 13 May 1990: seven people were hurt after a bomb exploded at Army education corps headquarters in England.
- 14 May 1990: a joint British Army/RUC patrol came under rocket attack in west Belfast.
- 15 May 1990: an IRA unit lobbed an "impact grenade" at an RUC mobile patrol in Copperfield Street in the Tiger's Bay area of Belfast. The IRA claimed to have scored a direct hit.
- 16 May 1990:
  - a 10 lb (4.5 kg) IRA Semtex bomb left adjacent to the headquarters of the Police Authority in Victoria Street, Belfast, was defused.
  - the IRA detonated a bomb under a military minibus in London, killing Sgt. Charles Chapman, and injuring four other soldiers.
  - an IRA unit carried out a gun and rocket attack on an RUC mobile patrol at Clogher, County Tyrone. The IRA claimed a warhead became embedded in the armour of an RUC vehicle and failed to explode.
- 17 May 1990: a 300 lb (140 kg) car bomb was defused on a country road in County Armagh.
- 18 May 1990: British Army bomb experts dug up and defused a 650 lb (290 kg) bomb in a ditch at a roadside outside Coalisland, County Tyrone.
- 21 May 1990:
  - a car bomb abandoned near Lifford Bridge, Strabane, County Tyrone was defused by bomb disposal experts from the British Army and Irish Defence Forces.
  - a 1.5 lb (0.68 kg) booby-trap bomb attached to the underside of a car belonging to an RUC officer was defused in Cookstown, County Tyrone.
  - a British soldier suffered shrapnel injuries when a bomb exploded between two patrol vehicles in the Turf Lodge area of West Belfast.
- 22 May 1990: an IRA suspect from Cookstown, County Tyrone was arrested in north London after a brief car chase. Two Kalashnikov rifles were recovered in the back of the car.
- 23 May 1990:
  - a new type of very large 500 lb (230 kg) IRA mortar battery mounted on a truck was intercepted in Dungannon, County Tyrone.
  - an IRA unit seriously injured an RUC officer in a gun attack at Strand Road RUC station in Derry.
- 24 May 1990: a new type of very large 500 lb (230 kg) mortar partially exploded and was later defused outside an RUC station in Omagh, County Tyrone.
- 27 May 1990: two Australian tourists, Nick Spanos and Stephen Melrose, were shot dead in the Netherlands, having been mistaken for off-duty British soldiers from a base across the German border. The IRA said it "deeply regretted the tragedy".
- 28 May 1990: an IRA unit carried out a blast bomb attack on a joint UDR-RUC patrol in Cromac Square in the Markets area of Belfast.
- 29 May 1990: an RUC officer spotted a 1.5 lb (0.68 kg) Semtex bomb attached to the underside of his car in County Antrim. More than thirty houses were evacuated while the British Army defused the device.
- 30 May 1990: an IRA unit threw a blast bomb at a British security forces patrol in the Markets area of Belfast.
- 1 June 1990:
  - a British soldier (Robert Davies) was killed and two others wounded when they were shot at close range by an IRA unit while waiting for a train at Lichfield railway station in Staffordshire, England.
  - a British Royal Artillery officer, Michael Dillon-Lee, was shot dead by the IRA in Dortmund, West Germany. He was one of the most senior soldiers killed in the conflict – holding the rank of major. In a subsequent car chase a West German police officer was injured when the IRA unit fired on the pursuing officers.
- 3 June 1990: a mine failed to injure a British Army patrol in Stewartstown, County Tyrone.
- 4 June 1990: a small no-warning anti-personnel bomb exploded at the proposed site of a new RUC base in the Lisnagelvin area of Derry. The IRA claimed that a construction worker was injured, the RUC issued a denial.
- 6 June 1990: a retired RUC officer and his wife (James and Ellen Sefton) were killed when an IRA booby trap bomb exploded underneath their car on the Ballygomartin Road in Belfast. A civilian was slightly injured when the car struck her.
- 9 June 1990: the IRA bombed the headquarters of the British Army's Honourable Artillery Company in central London, wounding 19 people.
- 10 June 1990: a part-time UDR soldier was seriously injured when a bomb planted under his car exploded as he left a pub in Lisnaskea, County Fermanagh.
- 13 June 1990: an IRA bomb damaged the recently vacated 18th-century home of Conservative Party figure Lord McAlpine in Hartley Whitney, England.
- 14 June 1990: a large IRA bomb badly damaged a building inside a British Army base at Hanover, West Germany.
- 15 June 1990:
  - a 2 lb (0.91 kg) Semtex device attached to an RUC officer's car was defused at Katesbridge, County Down.
  - services on the Belfast-Dublin railway line were disrupted after an IRA unit detonated a bomb by command wire as a British Army patrol passed near the Kilwilkee Estate in Lurgan.
- 20 June 1990:
  - a bomb exploded at RAF Stanmore Park, north London, causing some damage.
  - an IRA unit threw a drogue bomb at an RUC armoured patrol vehicle close to Andersonstown Leisure Centre in West Belfast. The device failed to explode and was defused by the British Army.
  - the IRA opened fire on British soldier and RUC officers sabotaging a border road with explosives at Greaghnafine, near Kinawley, County Fermanagh. The IRA claimed they'd disabled a security forces vehicle using a rocket and that a "sustained gun battle was fought."
- 21 June 1990:
  - a 600 lb (270 kg) IRA bomb "devastated" the centre of Cookstown, County Tyrone.
  - a 10 lb (4.5 kg) IRA bomb exploded in Dungannon, County Tyrone.
  - a 250 lb (110 kg) IRA bomb was defused in Omagh, County Tyrone.
  - a border customs post outside Newtownbutler, County Fermanagh, was heavily damaged in a bomb attack.
  - the IRA left hoax bomb devices along the railway between Lurgan and Portadown.
- 23 June 1990: a 5 lb (2.3 kg) Semtex device intended for British security forces was defused and two men arrested at the junction of Bridge Street and Dublin Road, Newry.
- 25 June 1990: a bomb exploded at the Carlton Club in London, injuring 20 people. Lord Kaberry died of his injuries on 13 March 1991.
- 27 June 1990: a remote control IRA bomb was detonated as two RUC officers arrived at the scene of a hoax call on Cathedral Road, Armagh, but only the detonator exploded.
- 28 June 1990:
  - a British soldier was seriously injured when a patrol was engaged by automatic gunfire from a lone IRA member in the main street of Pomeroy, County Tyrone. A follow-up search by British security forces nearby found two drogue bombs in a garden.
  - a bomb exploded on the Belfast-Dublin railway line between Newry and Poyntzpass, County Down. A young boy in a house a quarter of a mile away narrowly escaped injury when a large piece of railway line crashed through the roof.
- 30 June 1990: the IRA shot dead two RUC officers (John Beckett and Gary Meyer) in an ambush on Castle Street, Belfast.

=== July–August ===
- 1 July 1990: a 400 lb (180 kg) IRA bomb was defused by the RUC in Newtownbutler, County Fermanagh.
- 2 July 1990: an IRA RPG-7 rocket injured five RUC officers, three British soldiers, and two civilians at Grosvenor Road RUC base, Belfast.
- 6 July 1990: a 65 lb (29 kg) primed bomb with command wire was discovered near the RUC station in Maghera, County Londonderry and defused the following day.
- 7 July 1990: an incendiary bomb exploded on a bus in Belfast city centre. Hoax car bombs were also abandoned at several locations in Belfast.
- 8 July 1990: an IRA unit carried out a gun and bomb attack against a stationary RUC patrol car in Dungannon, County Tyrone. One RUC officer was seriously injured and another RUC officer returned fire.
- 11 July 1990: a 4 lb (1.8 kg) Semtex bomb was fired from an improvised grenade launcher at an RUC patrol vehicle in Cookstown, County Tyrone. The main charge failed to detonate, sparing a group of children in the blast radius from injury. The IRA claimed they had cleared any children from the area.
- 12 July 1990: an IRA unit fired several shots at a British Army mobile patrol travelling along Roden Street, West Belfast.
- 18 July 1990:
  - a van bomb containing a quantity of Semtex and 400 lb (180 kg) of home-made explosives was abandoned at Moybridge near Aughnacloy, County Tyrone. The Dublin-Derry road was closed for two days while British security forces dealt with the alert.
  - a drogue bomb was thrown at a British Army mobile patrol on the Springfield Road, Belfast, but failed to detonate.
- 20 July 1990: an IRA bomb exploded inside the London Stock Exchange after an IRA telephone warning; it blew a hole in the side of the building, but there were no injuries.
- 21 July 1990: twenty-five homes were damaged by a drogue bomb attack on the security forces in the New Lodge area of Belfast.
- 23 July 1990: the British Army defused a 150 lb (68 kg) van bomb left outside the courthouse in Strabane, County Tyrone.
- 24 July 1990: three RUC officers (Joshua Willis, William Hanson, and David Sterritt) as well as one civilian, were killed when an IRA unit ambushed a joint RUC and British Army patrol on Killylea Road in Armagh town. The patrol car was hit by a landmine, which blew it off the road and into a hedge. The IRA and Martin McGuinness (on behalf of Sinn Féin) apologised for the death of the civilian, a Roman Catholic nun, Sister Catherine Dunne, a native of Dublin. See: 1990 Armagh City roadside bomb
- 26 July 1990: the IRA shot dead bomb-maker Patrick Gerard "Paddy" Flood after discovering he was an RUC informer, following a series of botched bomb attacks and the capture of a number of IRA men in Derry. His body was found near Newtownhamilton, County Armagh.
- 30 July 1990:
  - Ian Gow, Conservative MP for Eastbourne, was assassinated by the IRA when a booby trap bomb exploded under his car at his home in East Sussex, England. The IRA claimed he was murdered due to his role in British policy decisions in Northern Ireland.
  - an IRA member was shot and injured and another had his arm broken during clashes with the Official IRA in the Markets area of Belfast. In response the PIRA moved large numbers of its members into the area.
- 31 July 1990: an IRA unit carried out a grenade attack on a UDR base in Cookstown, County Tyrone.
- 1 August 1990: an IRA sniper fired a single shot at a British security forces patrol in the Beechmount area of Belfast.
- 3 August 1990: the British Army defused a 600 lb (270 kg) bomb on a trailer in Rasharkin, County Antrim.
- 4 August 1990: an IRA unit carried out a grenade attack on a British security forces mobile patrol at the junction of Newtownards Road and Short Strand, Belfast.
- 6 August 1990:
  - an IRA sniper fired a single shot at a British Army patrol in Crossmaglen, County Armagh.
  - an IRA bomb attack targeted at former British Cabinet Secretary and head of the Civil Service Lord Armstrong failed after the bomb fell from underneath a car at his former home.
- 8 August 1990: several shots were fired at the RUC base in Pomeroy, County Tyrone.
- 13 August 1990:
  - the IRA planted a bomb at the Berkshire home of British Army General Sir Anthony Farrar-Hockley. The device was defused. His five-year-old grandson had picked it up but the device failed to detonate.
  - an IRA unit carried out a gun attack on British soldiers patrolling near Belfast High Court.
- 14 August 1990:
  - an explosive device was found and defused on the Belfast-Dublin railway line at Meigh, Forkhill, County Armagh.
  - an incendiary bomb left in a hijacked bus abandoned near the border on the Letterkenny Road, Derry, was defused by the British Army. Two more buses were hijacked by armed IRA members in the Shantallow and Guildhall areas of the city. The SDLP accused the IRA of orchestrating the unrest for the benefit of visiting NORAID supporters.
- 16 August 1990:
  - the IRA fired a single mortar into the RUC compound in Strabane, County Tyrone, but the projectile failed to detonate.
  - an IRA unit opened fire on British security forces in Pomeroy, County Tyrone.
- 18 August 1990: a builder (Andrew Bogle) was killed by a booby-trap bomb on a building site in Castlederg, County Tyrone. The IRA said it carried out the attack because the building firm worked for the security forces.
- 23 August 1990:
  - the IRA claimed to have placed forty hoax bombs across Belfast, causing widespread disruption.
  - the IRA carried out a sustained gun attack on the RUC station in Pomeroy, County Tyrone, while several employees of an outside contractor were working at the station.
- 24 August 1990:
  - an IRA unit fired twenty shots from a hijacked vehicle at Oldpark RUC station, West Belfast. There were no reported injuries. The IRA claimed to have hit an RUC officer.
  - a 1.5 lb (0.68 kg) Semtex device attached to the underside of a UDR soldier's car was defused in Brookeborough, County Fermanagh.
  - a 70 lb (32 kg) shrapnel bomb was defused by the British Army in Castlewellan, County Down.
- 28 August 1990:
  - an IRA unit lobbed an "impact grenade" at an armoured vehicle in the Unity Flats area of Belfast but the device failed to detonate.
- 31 August 1990:
  - an RUC Reserve officer discovered a booby-trap bomb under his car in Gilford, County Down. This was a cover story, an informer (Martin McGartland) had given the RUC advance warning of the attack and the IRA target and his family had moved out and the RUC had occupied the house.
  - the IRA claimed responsibility for an explosion in Eglington, County Londonderry. The IRA said an RUC officer who lived in the area had been their target.

=== September–October ===
- 1 September 1990:
  - the British Army defused 300 lb (140 kg) bomb outside a home occupied by members of the security forces in Omagh, County Tyrone.
  - a thrown blast bomb landed inside an RUC station and exploded in Coalisland, County Tyrone.
  - the IRA claimed responsibility for a hoax car bomb left outside Pomeroy RUC station, County Tyrone.
  - two 100 lb (45 kg) bombs were dismantled by the British Army outside Antrim town UDR base after a pair of IRA members were spotted. The IRA claimed the bombs were left within the perimeter fence, but this was denied by the RUC.
- 4 September 1990: an IRA unit fired on British Army personnel moving to seal off two cross-border roads linking County Tyrone and County Monaghan.
- 5 September 1990:
  - several RUC officers were injured when the IRA detonated a van bomb at Loughgall RUC base in County Armagh. A local church and a school were also damaged.
  - two brothers were shot and injured in an IRA attack on their van in Magherafelt, County Londonderry. They were employees of a building firm which did work for the security forces.
- 6 September 1990: the IRA planted two bombs inside the Royal Navy's Royal Fleet Auxiliary ship the RFA Fort Victoria (A387). One of the bombs was defused, but the other bomb went off. The blast caused extensive damage to the engine room, resulting in severe flooding.
- 7 September 1990: an IRA unit fired on Springfield Road RUC station, Belfast, with a heavy machine gun. A British Army patrol in the vicinity also reportedly came under fire.
- 10 September 1990:
  - the IRA bombed a British Army and Navy recruiting office in Derby, England.
  - a senior citizen escaped injury when a bomb attached to his car failed to explode in Newtownabbey, County Antrim. He had no connections to the security forces.
  - a gang of armed men, one of them dressed as a Garda officer, raided the home of a gun dealer in Toomevara, County Tipperary, seizing 60 shotguns and rifles. An IRA unit based in the Munster area was blamed.
- 13 September 1990:
  - the British Army defused a 15 lb (6.8 kg) bomb in the Bogside area of Derry.
  - an IRA unit threw a blast bomb at an RUC patrol vehicle on Gardenmore Road, Twinbrook, Belfast.
- 14 September 1990: the British Army defused a 15 lb (6.8 kg) bomb in a bar opposite the Law Courts in Belfast city centre. The bomb was discovered during a follow-up operation after an IRA member tossed a grenade into the car park of the Courts.
- 15 September 1990:
  - an RUC detective (Louis Robinson) was kidnapped and later shot dead by the IRA in County Armagh. A minibus in which he and five prison officers were travelling was stopped at an IRA checkpoint in Killeen, County Armagh. Three prison officers managed to escape, but the RUC detective and two prison officers were bundled into the back of waiting cars. The two prison officers were released, but Robinson was shot in the back of the head and his body dumped near Belleeks. His body was found by the side of Concession Road, Cullaville, three days later.
  - the IRA fired mortars at the RUC base in Carrickmore, County Tyrone. The devices missed and there were no reported injuries.
  - a blast bomb was thrown at a British Army patrol vehicle but failed to explode at the junction of the Springfield Road and the New Barnsley Estate, Belfast.
  - two armed IRA members were spotted at the home of businessman Charles Tidbury near Fareham, Hampshire, England. Armed police guarding the house attempted to apprehend them but they escaped. The two IRA members, Pearse McAuley and Nessan Quinlivan, were arrested at Stonehenge on 2 October.
- 16 September 1990:
  - the British Army defused a Semtex device which had fallen off a car at Enniskillen, County Fermanagh.
  - the British Army defused a 150 lb (68 kg) van bomb parked outside the courthouse in Strabane, County Tyrone.
- 17 September 1990:
  - a British Army sergeant was shot and injured by the IRA outside an army recruiting office in Finchley, London.
- 18 September 1990:
  - the IRA attempted to kill Air Chief Marshal Sir Peter Terry at his Staffordshire home. Terry had been a prime target since his days as Governor of Gibraltar, in which capacity he signed the documents allowing the SAS to operate against IRA volunteers in 1988. The revenge attack took place at 9 pm at the Main Road house. The gunman opened fire through a window, hitting him at least nine times and injuring his wife, Lady Betty, near the eye. The couple's daughter, Elizabeth, was found suffering from shock. Peter Terry's face had to be rebuilt as the shots shattered his face, and two high-velocity bullets lodged a fraction of an inch from his brain.
  - the British Army defused a 150 lb (68 kg) van bomb which had been left outside the courthouse three days earlier in Strabane, County Tyrone.
- 19 September 1990:
  - an RUC sergeant was shot and injured in an IRA ambush on the Scraghy Road near Castlederg, County Tyrone but managed to drive to safety.
  - a British security forces mobile patrol narrowly escaped injury in Derry after a bomb exploded on the Letterkenny road. The incident happened 200 yards (182 meters) away from the Brandywell football stadium an hour before a UEFA Cup match; Dutch team SBV Vitesse ran for cover and smoke drifted over the venue. Hundreds of fans in the area escaped injury and the game went ahead.
- 20 September 1990:
  - an IRA unit fired up to one hundred shots at a British Army installation in Upper Bishop Street in Derry city centre.
  - a British soldier was hit and wounded during a heavy machine gun attack on an army patrol at Drumalt, South Armagh.
- 22 September 1990: the IRA claimed responsibility for four hoax van-bombs in Belfast.
- 23 September 1990:
  - an off-duty UDR soldier (Colin McCullough) was shot dead by the IRA at Oxford Island, Lough Neagh, County Armagh. He was sitting in his car with his girlfriend when he was shot 13 times.
  - an IRA unit fired several shots at British soldiers changing the guard at the security post at Girdwood Barracks, North Belfast.
- 24 September 1990: the British Army defused a 2 lb (0.91 kg) Semtex booby-trap bomb near Rathfriland, County Down.
- 25 September 1990: an IRA unit carried out an attack on a sangar forming part of a newly erected security zone around the Belfast Law Courts.
- 26 September 1990:
  - a British Army helicopter was fired upon while landing at Newtownhamilton British Army base, County Armagh. One soldier was wounded.
  - a lone IRA gunman with a semi-automatic rifle fired twenty shots at the main observation post of Henry Taggart Barracks, Belfast.
- 27 September 1990:
  - a 4 lb (1.8 kg) IRA Semtex bomb, concealed within a speaker's lectern, was defused during an international anti-terrorism conference at the Royal Over-Seas League building in central London. An IRA statement released afterward claimed the intended target was Foreign Officer minister William Waldegrave.
  - the IRA carried out a sustained gun attack on a British Army observation post at Drumavackall, near Crossmaglen, County Armagh.
  - the IRA carried out seven separate gun attacks on British security forces bases and patrols in Belfast over three days. There were no reported injuries.
  - IRA members hijacked a bus, planted a hoax bomb onboard and abandoned it on the main Derry-Donegal road at Coshquin.
  - an RUC patrol found a 15 lb (6.8 kg) bomb in a gas cylinder at Lurganboy Road in Castlederg, County Tyrone, It was neutralised in a controlled explosion.
  - the IRA attempted to kill British security forces members in a suspected bomb attack in the Beechmount Avenue area of Strabane, County Tyrone.
- 28 September 1990: three IRA incendiary devices detonated in stores in Belfast city centre, of six planted. There were also several hoax bomb warnings.
- 29 September 1990: an IRA unit opened fire on a man they claimed was a UVF commander at a quarry works nears Cookstown, County Tyrone. He survived the attack.
- 1 October 1990: an RUC Reserve officer walked away with only "slight" injuries when a bomb exploded on his lorry near Maguiresbridge, County Fermanagh.
- 5 October 1990: an RUC patrol escaped injury when an 80 lb (36 kg) landmine was detonated in their vicinity on Washingbay Road near Coalisland, County Tyrone.
- 8 October 1990:
  - the IRA carried out simultaneous gun and bomb attacks against British security forces bases in Belfast; at New Barnsley, Springfield Road, North Howard Street, and Broadway.
  - incendiary devices were left in several business premises in Belfast; in Ann Street, North Street, and Lower North Street.A furniture store and a bar were damaged, other devices were defused.
  - a UDR soldier escaped injury after a passer-by spotted a bomb attached to his car in Derry.
- 9 October 1990:
  - IRA volunteers Martin McCaughey and Dessie Grew were killed by the SAS near Loughgall, County Armagh.
  - an IRA bomb fell off the car of man in Coleraine, County Londonderry, and partially exploded. He was related to a member of the security forces.
- 11 October 1990: a bomb consisting of 10 lb (4.5 kg) home-made explosives packed into a gas cylinder, buried beside a footpath in the Creggan area of Derry, was defused by the British Army.
- 13 October 1990: the IRA attacked an RUC/British Army patrol at a security barrier in Belfast. A lone IRA volunteer armed with a Browning Hi-Power pistol approached an RUC vehicle at the barrier and fired a number of shots through the window. This pistol had been captured from Michael Stone during his attack on a funeral two years earlier. Two RUC officers were wounded. One of these (Samuel Todd) died of his wounds two days later.
- 15 October 1990: the IRA claimed responsibility for incendiary devices planted in four commercial premises in the Cornmarket area of Belfast.
- 16 October 1990:
  - a former RUC Reserve officer (Steven Craig) was shot dead in the car park of a hotel on the Antrim Road, north Belfast.
  - an IRA unit was forced to abort an operation in the Shantallow area of Derry after the RUC sent a priest to the house they had commandeered. A 500 lb (230 kg) van bomb abandoned nearby was defused, and later a second device inside the home was also defused.
- 17 October 1990: a blast bomb was thrown at Mountpottinger RUC station in the Short Strand area of Belfast.
- 19 October 1990:
  - two blast bombs were thrown at Oldpark RUC station, Belfast. Three people were treated for shock.
  - an IRA under-car booby trap bomb attack was foiled after UDR soldiers arrested a woman at a checkpoint outside Stewartstown, County Tyrone. A revolver and ammunition was also recovered.
- 20 October 1990:
  - a former UDR soldier (David Pollock) was shot dead by the IRA in Strabane. An IRA unit rammed his car on the Melmount Road. Three IRA volunteers then left their car and began shooting into the man's car with rifles and handguns.
  - an IRA mortar was defused by the British Army in Lisnaskea, County Fermanagh.
- 23 October 1990:
  - a UVF member (William Aitken) was shot dead by the IRA on the Falls Road, Belfast. Two men approached his car on either side. As one distracted him from the passenger side another leaned through the window and shot him in the head. The IRA initially claimed he was a UFF member although it later emerged he was a member of the UVF.
  - an IRA unit carried out a gun attack on Oldpark RUC base. Belfast. The IRA claimed they injured an RUC officer.
- 24 October 1990:
  - in a proxy bomb attack, the IRA forced a British Army civilian employee (Patrick Gillespie), by holding his family hostage, to deliver a bomb to a British Army checkpoint at Buncrana Road, Coshquin, County Londonderry (on the County Donegal border). The bomb detonated, killing Gillespie and five British soldiers. As the bomb exploded an IRA unit opened fire from across the border. Over 25 houses in a nearby estate were damaged by the bomb.
  - in a proxy bomb attack, the IRA forced a civilian (allegedly targeted because he served RUC officers at his filling station), by holding his family hostage, to deliver a bomb to a British Army checkpoint at Cloghoge, County Armagh. The civilian driver escaped but a soldier was killed and 13 other soldiers were injured.
  - an attempted IRA proxy-bomb attack against a British Army base in Omagh, County Tyrone, failed when the bomb did not fully explode.
- 25 October 1990:
  - a British Army post in Clady, County Tyrone was targeted by a mortar battery, but the device failed to detonate.
  - a 1.5 lb (0.68 kg) Semtex bomb was discovered at Castle Park, Lisnaskea, County Fermanagh.
- 27 October 1990: the IRA reported an attack on two British Army helicopters with heavy-machine guns near Corragunt on the Fermanagh-Monaghan border. The RUC denied any incident occurred or any helicopters were hit.
- 30 October 1990: a mortar aimed at the RUC station in Dungannon, County Tyrone, was found and defused.
- 31 October 1990:
  - a small Semtex bomb packed with nails was defused at a security sangar adjacent to Chichester Street and Victoria Street in Belfast city centre.
  - a signal master was held at gunpoint while a 47 lb (21 kg) bomb was placed on a railway line at Newry station. The device was defused by the British Army the following day.
  - a 40 lb (18 kg) bomb partially detonated at a petrol station on Belfast Road, Newry, following a telephone warning.

=== November–December ===
- 1 November 1990: the IRA claimed responsibility for several hoax bombs left in Belfast city centre that caused significant disruption.
- 2 November 1990:
  - Albert Cooper, a UDR soldier, was killed by the IRA when he triggered a booby trap bomb attached to a car in Cookstown, County Tyrone. An IRA volunteer (Geraldine Ferrity) had left a car rigged with explosives in his Cookstown garage and asked him to work on it. When he put the car in gear it exploded.
  - a Semtex booby trap bomb was found attached to the underside of a car belonging to a member of the security forces in Carryduff, County Down, and later defused.
  - the IRA claimed they fired a rocket at Kinawley RUC station, County Fermanagh. On 12 November the IRA South Fermanagh Brigade issued a statement claiming the unexploded warhead was still lying on the ground.
- 5 November 1990: the IRA claimed to have planted four bombs at Drumadd Barracks, Armagh. The base, then hosting a recruitment open night for the UDR, was evacuated. The alert was later declared a hoax. The IRA later claimed they attempted to launch a mortar attack but the four devices failed to explode.
- 6 November 1990: a booby-trap bomb attached to the underside of a former RUC officer's car was defused at Enagh Place in the Waterside area of Derry.
- 7 November 1990: a 5 lb (2.3 kg) Semtex bomb was detonated while British soldiers investigated a suspect vehicle at St. George's Market in Belfast city centre, injuring a UDR soldier.
- 9 November 1990: the IRA was responsible for abandoning 30 hoax car bombs at road junctions across Belfast, causing widespread disruption.
- 10 November 1990:
  - passengers and driver fled a bus after an IRA member left an incendiary device onboard and shouted a warning. The device exploded at Laganbank Road, Belfast.
  - an attempted IRA bombing in Belfast city centre was aborted and the car containing the bomb abandoned at the Westlink. The device was defused by the British Army following an IRA warning.
  - two RUC officers (David Murphy and Thomas Taylor) and two civilians (Keith Dowey and Norman Kendall) were shot dead by the IRA while they were out shooting wildfowl at Castor Bay, near Morrows Point, Lough Neagh, County Armagh. See: 1990 Lough Neagh Ambush
  - the IRA carried out a mortar attack on the RUC station in Toome, County Antrim. The projectile missed its target and exploded nearby.
  - shots were fired at British security forces establishing a roadblock at the Woodend Road near Kilrea, County Londonderry.
- 12 November 1990:
  - two RUC officers survived an IRA landmine explosion adjacent to their armoured patrol vehicle on the Tassagh Road in County Armagh with minor injuries. A cow was killed when it triggered a second device left nearby.
  - 50 lb (23 kg) of Semtex and several firearms were found with six IRA suspects by police in London.
- 13 November 1990: the IRA fired shots into a house in Parkhead Crescent, Newry, injuring a man. The motive was unclear.
- 15 November 1990: the IRA claimed they fired forty shots at a building contractors' convoy under RUC escort at Donaghmore while it travelled along the Cookstown-Omagh to a security forces installation.
- 17 November 1990: the IRA released a statement saying they had been forced to defuse a large roadside bomb at Cappagh, County Tyrone, because of a heavy British security forces presence.
- 20 November 1990: an IRA unit fired several shots at members of British security forces manning a fortified sangar adjacent to Belfast High Court.
- 21 November 1990:
  - a UDR soldier was slightly injured after a bomb exploded in May Street, Warrenpoint, County Down.
  - a dozen IRA members established a checkpoint on the main Newry-Crossmaglen road, Armagh, and issued leaflets to motorists warning persons working with British security forces. The security forces weren't informed until several hours later, after the IRA men dispersed.
- 22 November 1990:
  - a UDR soldier was injured after a 100 lb (45 kg) bomb exploded in a derelict house near Cappagh, County Tyrone. Security forces had been lured to the area by a decoy bomb alert.
  - the IRA took over a man's house in Newtownbutler, County Fermanagh. While his parents were held at gunpoint, he was forced to drive a Toyota Hilux pick-up truck to Annaghmartin military checkpoint. The IRA unit badly beat his legs to prevent him from escaping. The man's father was also assaulted, suffering broken ribs. He was told that the truck carried a bomb on a five-minute timer. When he reached the checkpoint, he shouted a warning and a small explosion was heard, but the main bomb failed to detonate. The vehicle was found to contain 3,500 pounds (1,600 kg) of homemade explosives, the biggest IRA bomb until then. The IRA claimed the driver's family had done work for the security forces.
- 24 November 1990: the Official IRA allegedly attempted to abduct a former Provisional IRA prisoner at gunpoint from a pub in the Twinbrook area of Belfast, following an argument. In the brawl that followed an OIRA revolver was lost and an OIRA member beaten unconscious.
- 25 November 1990:
  - an IRA bomb exploded in a litter bin beside the RUC station in Randalstown, County Antrim. RUC officers lured to the scene by a warning escaped injury.
  - a 2 lb (0.91 kg) booby-trap bomb attached to the underside of a UDR soldier's car was defused in Sion Mills, County Tyrone.
- 26 November 1990: the IRA issued threats to shops in the south Armagh area not to serve off-duty members of the Garda and Irish Defence Forces, alleging they were engaged in intelligence-gathering operations along the border.
- 30 November 1990: an IRA unit launched an RPG rocket and fired several shots at a security hut at the home of High Court judge Ian Higgins on the Antrim Road, Belfast, injuring two RUC guards. A similar attack had been carried out in February 1987.
- 1 December 1990:
  - a former UDR soldier (Hubert Gilmore) was shot dead by the IRA near Kilrea, County Londonderry. The IRA's South Derry Brigade said he was killed because he worked for a building firm which was contracted to the British Army and not because he was a former British soldier. His wife was injured in the shooting, the IRA described her injury as "regrettable".
  - an IRA unit launched a machine gun attack on a British Army patrol at a permanent checkpoint at Killyvilly, along the Fermanagh-Monaghan border. Troops from the Royal Irish Rangers returned fire. The IRA claimed afterwards they fired over three hundred rounds during the engagement.
- 3 December 1990: David Shiels, a Protestant civilian, was shot dead at his mobile home on Crew Road, Maghera, County Londonderry. The IRA admitted responsibility and said it believed the man was member of the security forces. It later "profoundly apologised" and said that its volunteers had been acting on "erroneous information".
- 5 December 1990: an IRA bomb caused serious damage on the Belfast-Dublin railway near Jonesborough, County Armagh.
- 6 December 1990: the IRA claimed responsibility for three unexploded bombs left outside a pub in Templepatrick, County Antrim, claiming an RUC social function was being held there.
- 7 December 1990: an IRA unit fired thirty shots at a British Army mobile patrol on the Monagh bypass road in West Belfast.
- 8 December 1990: two RUC officers were slightly injured when a blast bomb was thrown at an RUC station in the Mountpottinger area of Belfast. The IRA claimed responsibility.
- 10 December 1990:
  - several businesses in County Fermanagh announced they were no longer serving members of British security forces following IRA threats.
  - an IRA unit fired several shots at a British Army mobile patrol returning to Henry Taggart Barracks on the edge of the Ballymurphy Estate in West Belfast.
- 14 December 1990: an IRA unit attempted to kill an RUC detective at his home in Armagh City. They left a bomb, which later exploded, after discovering he was absent.
- 16 December 1990:
  - an IRA bomb exploded on the main Belfast-Dublin railway in County Armagh.
  - an IRA bomb in a hijacked lorry exploded at Killeen customs post near Newry, causing widespread disruption.
- 18 December 1990: a no-warning IRA bomb exploded in a waste bin in CastleCourt shopping centre, Belfast, while British Army experts were defusing a car bomb in the multistorey car park. There were no reported injuries as the complex had been evacuated two minutes prior.
- 20 December 1990:
  - an RUC Reserve Constable (Wilfred Wethers) was shot dead by an IRA sniper in Waringstown, County Down. The officer was shot eight times by a sniper who was waiting in a nearby field. As the officer approached in his car the gunman opened fire.
  - IRA gunmen seized a milk float and forced a driver to go to a permanent vehicle checkpoint on the County Fermanagh border between Newtownbutler and Rosslea. Soldiers ran for cover after the hostage shouted a warning, although an examination of the vehicle afterwards suggested it was a hoax bomb.
  - eighty families were evacuated as a suspect device was examined after a proxy bomb alert at a border checkpoint in Derry. The alert started when the IRA targeted a British patrol nearby with a 150 lb (68 kg) bomb.
  - two British soldiers were slightly injured after a bomb explosion in Stewartstown, County Tyrone.
- 22 December 1990:
  - an IRA unit fired on a UDR soldier's car in an ambush in the Brooke Park area of Suffolk, Belfast. The off-duty soldier wasn't hit and escaped the scene.
  - the IRA claimed to have left a bomb on Castlebalfour Road in Lisnaskea, County Fermanagh.
- 27 December 1990:
  - a company from the Duke of Edinburgh's Royal Regiment manning a border checkpoint exchanged fire with an IRA unit at Annaghmartin, County Fermanagh, ending the IRA Christmas truce. The facilities suffered minor damage. The IRA claimed they fired over four hundreds rounds using heavy machine guns.
  - two RUC officers were injured after a Semtex blast bomb was thrown at an RUC station in the Mountpottinger area of Belfast.
- 29 December 1990: six incendiary devices were found in two department stores in Belfast city centre.
- 30 December 1990: Provisional IRA volunteer and Sinn Féin member Fergal Caraher was killed by Royal Marines at a checkpoint in Cullyhanna, County Armagh.
  - three incendiary devices exploded in a department store and a discount store in Belfast city centre.

== 1991 ==
=== January–February ===
- 1 January 1991: an IRA unit opened fire with a 12.7mm machine gun on a British Army permanent vehicle checkpoint at the border at Aughnacloy, County Tyrone, soldiers manning the installation returned fire.
- 3 January 1991: two drogue bombs were thrown at a British Army mobile patrol at the junction of Colinbrook Crescent and the Pembroke Loop Road, Belfast.
- 4 January 1991:
  - the IRA opened fire on the Belfast Law Courts, targeting civilian workers repairing the building.
  - an IRA unit carried out a gun and bomb attack against Henry Taggart Barracks, Belfast. Two more blast bombs were thrown at a security forces patrol engaged in a follow-up operation on the Whiterock Road.
- 5 January 1991:
  - a 1 lb (0.45 kg) Semtex device attached to the underside of a car belonging to an RUC officer was defused in Cregagh Street, Belfast.
  - a factory and six shops in Belfast were destroyed by incendiary devices planted by the IRA.
  - the IRA threatened to shoot civilian workers repairing utilities for the Coshquin British Army border checkpoint on the outskirts of Derry, damaged in an IRA proxy bomb attack the previous October. The IRA also claimed that they had attempted to destroy a water pipe supplying the checkpoint with a 2 lb (0.91 kg) Semtex bomb but it failed to detonate.
  - an IRA unit fired several shots at Springfield Road RUC station, Belfast, before throwing two blast bombs. Thirty nearby homes were damaged.
- 7 January 1991:
  - the IRA fired twenty shots at the Belfast Law Courts, targeting civilian workers repairing the building.
  - forty shots were fired at British soldiers examining a hoax device outside Fort Jericho in the Turf Lodge area of West Belfast.
- 8 January 1991:
  - an incendiary device was defused in Castlecourt Shopping Centre, Belfast.
  - an IRA culvert bomb injured three soldiers and a civilian and caused extensive damage to nearby houses on Dundalk Road, near Newtownhamilton, County Armagh. An 11-month old baby was showered with glass as she lay in her cot.
  - the IRA fired upwards of one hundred rounds at soldiers manning the Coshquin checkpoint on the outskirts of Derry, still under repair.
- 11 January 1991:
  - a blast bomb was thrown at an RUC vehicle in the Springfield area of West Belfast.
  - the IRA was responsible for several bomb alerts in Belfast, causing widespread disruption.
- 15 January 1991: two RUC officers suffered minor injures when a drogue bomb was thrown at their car in Newry.
- 16 January 1991: the Belfast-Dublin railway line was closed after an explosion was heard near Lurgan.
- 17 January 1991: a lorry driver (whom the IRA claimed was a part-time RUC officer) escaped injury after he discovered an IRA bomb attached to the underside of his vehicle in Castlederg, County Tyrone. The RUC claimed he had no connection to the security forces.
- 18 January 1991:
  - an off-duty UDR soldier escaped injury after a bomb fell off the underside of his car at Victoria Bridge, County Tyrone.
  - the IRA launched a mortar attack on the joint British-Army base in Crossmaglen, County Armagh. The devices exploded prematurely, injuring a civilian.
  - a 1 lb (0.45 kg) IRA Semtex bomb left in a hijacked car was defused at Belfast International Airport.
  - incendiary devices exploded at Central Station in Belfast and Larne Harbour station, County Antrim.
- 19 January 1991:
  - an IRA landmine injured British soldiers near Newtownhamilton, County Armagh.
  - the IRA was responsible for several bomb alerts in Belfast, causing widespread disruption.
- 21 January 1991: a former RUC officer (Cullen Stephenson) was shot dead by the IRA in Brookeborough, County Fermanagh. A British Army company conducting clearance of the area defused a booby-trap left by the attackers. The IRA claimed a second RUC Reserve officer in the vehicle escaped uninjured.
- 22 January 1991: an IRA unit preparing to carry out a mortar attack was detected and a lengthy exchange of fired ensued in Strabane, County Tyrone.
- 23 January 1991:
  - the IRA opened fire on the Belfast Law Courts, targeting civilians workers carrying out repairs on the building.
  - the British Army defused a booby-trap bomb attached to the underside of a car in Markethill, County Armagh. The owner had no connections to the security forces.
- 24 January 1991: an IRA unit threw an explosive device at a British Army base in Staffordshire, England. At least one shot was also fired.
- 27 January 1991: the IRA was responsible for two incendiary bomb attacks on commercial premises in Belfast.
- 29 January 1991: after the IRA placed a bomb under the car of a senior executive, a dairy firm in Armagh town agreed not to supply the British Army or the RUC.
- 30 January 1991:
  - the IRA sent a hoax bomb to the Belfast Law Courts, intending to disrupt ongoing repair work.
  - a blast bomb was thrown into Mountpottinger RUC base, Belfast.
- 31 January 1991:
  - a car firm in Ballymena, County Antrim agreed to cease supplying British security forces following IRA threats.
  - an IRA unit fired 89 rounds at a Wessex helicopter taking off from the British Army base at Forkhill, South Armagh, with a heavy machine gun and a GPMG machine gun. The helicopter disengaged successfully after being hit by one of the bullets.
  - the British Army defused a hidden 4 lb (1.8 kg) IRA Semtex bomb rigged to a pornographic magazine left open on top of a wall in the vicinity of an Orange Hall, near Coagh, County Tyrone. It was a new type of bomb consisting of Semtex surrounded by bolts and nails; days earlier a similar device exploded prematurely and injured an IRA member in a hijacked car in north Belfast.
  - a small Semtex nail bomb was thrown at RUC officers diverting traffic from abandoned car in the Short Strand area of Belfast. The device was safely defused and a man was arrested.
  - a blast bomb was thrown at a joint British Army-RUC patrol in Stewart Street in the Markets area of Belfast.
  - a 350 lb (160 kg) bomb was defused by the British Army on the Killeenan Road, Cookstown, County Tyrone. An IRA statement said they had been forced to abandon the bomb.
- 1 February 1991: a bomb targeting British soldiers exploded at the front of a pub in the centre of Roslea, County Fermanagh in the early hours of the morning. The IRA had attempted to lure the British Army to the site with several hoax calls the preceding night.
- 2 February 1991: a small bomb was detonated by command wire as a joint British Army/RUC patrol travelled along Madam's Bank Road in the Shantallow area of Derry.
- 3 February 1991:
  - the IRA launched another "proxy bomb" attack on a British Army Ulster Defense Regiment base in Magherafelt, County Londonderry. The estimated 500 lbs of explosives blew up outside the UDR barracks and caused structural damage to buildings within a quarter of a mile radius. A young woman was held hostage while her husband, employed by a construction firm that did contract work for the security forces, was forced to drive the vehicle with the bomb. The driver escaped and there were no serious injuries in the blast. A partially-disabled man injured in the blast (Albert White, 79) died in hospital on 26 February.
  - two blast bombs exploded at Andersonstown RUC station.
- 5 February 1991: a 1.1 lb (0.50 kg) Semtex device attached to the underside of a car belonging to a member of the security forces was defused in Whitehead, County Antrim.
- 7 February 1991:
  - the IRA launched a mortar attack on members of the British Cabinet and the Prime Minister, John Major in a Cabinet session at Number 10 Downing Street at the height of a huge security clampdown amid the Gulf War. The mortar missed any buildings, landing in a garden.
  - an IRA unit threw a blast bomb at Henry Taggart security forces base in the Ballymurphy area of Belfast.
- 9 February 1991:
  - a civilian was forced to drive a device in his van into a permanent vehicle checkpoint at Aughnacloy, County Tyrone. Fifty nearby homes were evacuated while the British Army carried out a controlled explosion. The bomb turned out to be a hoax. The IRA claimed responsibility.
  - a taxi driver was stopped in the Whiterock area of Belfast and forced to carry a beer keg bomb to Broadway Towers. The area was evacuated by British security forces and the device later declared a hoax. It was one of several hoax bombs in Belfast perpetrated by the IRA on 9 February.
  - several bursts of automatic fire were directed at a sangar at North Queen Street RUC station, Belfast. No fire was returned and there were no reported injuries.
  - a nail bomb was thrown at York Road RUC station, Belfast.
  - the British Army defused an incendiary device found in a chain DIY store in Newtownabbey on the outskirts of Belfast.
- 10 February 1991: a booby-trap bomb found on a grass verge in Cookstown, County Tyrone, had fallen off a car belonging to a member of the security forces, the RUC believed.
- 11 February 1991: a blast bomb was thrown at a British security forces mobile patrol on Mountpottinger Road, Belfast.
- 13 February 1991: a Lynx helicopter was heavily damaged and brought down near Crossmaglen by an IRA unit using one DShK heavy machine gun and two GPMG machine guns. The crew were rescued unscathed by another helicopter (see: 1991 British Army Lynx shootdown).
- 14 February 1991: a UDR soldier was seriously wounded when a Saint Valentine's Day card bomb which he had received exploded in Killen. Another man who had no connection to the security forces received a card bomb in Castlederg, County Tyrone, but escaped injury.
- 15 February 1991: the IRA attempted to shoot down another Lynx helicopter that was extracting men from the Duke of Edinburgh's Royal Regiment after a border patrol from St Angelo Barracks, Trory, County Fermanagh. The attack took place south of Clogher, in County Tyrone. More than 360 rounds were fired from across the border. The helicopter was forced to abort the landing and return to base.
- 16 February 1991:
  - the IRA claimed responsibility for a single incendiary device left in CastleCourt shopping complex, accompanied by hoax bombs at road junctions in other parts of Belfast.
- 18 February 1991: a bomb exploded at Victoria Station, one man (David Corner), was killed and 38 people injured. A bomb also exploded at Paddington Station delaying upwards of 500,000 commuters, but there were no injuries. Police confirmed that the IRA had given a 45-minute advance warning.
- 19 February 1991: an IRA sniper fired ten shots at British soldiers standing in the back of a patrol vehicle outside Grosvenor Road RUC station in West Belfast.
- 22 February 1991: the British Army sealed off a farm leased by an RUC officer near Kesh, County Fermanagh following a claim of a bomb left in a tractor.
- 23 February 1991:
  - a dozen-strong IRA unit launched a mortar and machine gun assault from a vantage point on a newly built British Army outpost at Fosters Mountain at Silverbridge, County Armagh. A 15-minute gun battle erupted right after the first attack.
  - an IRA unit threw a drogue bomb at a British security forces patrol in the Newtownards Road, Belfast. The device failed to explode.
- 24 February 1991: a semtex booby-trap bomb attached to a British Territorial Army soldier's car was defused outside an army base in Derry. The owner had spotted the device being planted and three men were arrested shortly afterwards.
- 25 February 1991:
  - the IRA fired several bursts of gunfire at civilian contractors repairing the Belfast Law Courts.
  - the IRA carried out a sustained gun attack on Woodbourne RUC station, West Belfast.
  - an IRA unit carried out a bomb attack against a British Army foot patrol on the Westlink motorway near the Grosvenor Road junction in the Lower Falls area of Belfast.
  - the IRA carried out a gun attack on Fort Jericho on the Springfield Road, Belfast. British soldiers returned fire.
  - an IRA unit fired several shots at an observation post at Mountpottinger RUC station in the Short Strand area of Belfast.
  - a bomb exploded on a railway line near St Albans in Hertfordshire, England. Minutes after the blast, all mainline stations in London were forced to close because of another bomb warning. The IRA was blamed.
- 26 February 1991: two 3 lb (1.4 kg) Semtex devices exploded at the Shorts Brothers headquarters in Belfast.
- 28 February 1991: two 4 lb (1.8 kg) Semtex bombs exploded at the home of a retired judge on the Somerton Road, North Belfast. Several RUC officers were injured by the second blast while investigating the first. The IRA was blamed.

=== March–April ===
- 1 March 1991:
  - two UDR soldiers were killed in an IRA ambush on Killylea Road in Armagh town. One soldier, an Englishman (Paul Sutcliffe) died instantly; the other soldier (Roger Love) died three days later, on 4 March. This was the first recorded use by the IRA of a Mark-12 horizontal-mortar bomb (see Mullacreevie ambush).
  - the IRA claimed responsibility for several hoax car bombs left at hotels in Belfast. More hoax bombs were left at British security forces bases in the following week.
- 2 March 1991:
  - an IRA unit took over a house and attacked the nearby joint British Army-RUC base with automatic gunfire in Crossmaglen, County Armagh. Several hundreds rounds were fired in the ensuing gun battle but there were no reported injuries.
  - a bomb in a taxi abandoned in Duncairn Gardens, Belfast, was defused by the British Army following a warning from a caller claiming to represent the IRA.
- 3 March 1991:
  - a blast bomb thrown at Girdwood Barracks off the Antrim Road, North Belfast exploded at the perimeter fence.
  - three IRA volunteers (John Quinn, Dwayne O'Donnell, and Malcolm Nugent), along with a Catholic civilian (Thomas Armstrong), were killed by the Ulster Volunteer Force (UVF) during a gun attack on Boyle's Bar in Cappagh, County Tyrone. The volunteers arrived in a car as a UVF gang was about to attack the pub. The UVF fired at the car (killing the volunteers) then fired through the window of the pub (killing the civilian).
  - the IRA detonated a bomb hidden in a wall as a joint British Army-RUC patrol passed on Cemetery Road, Strabane, County Tyrone. There were no reported injuries.
- 4 March 1991:
  - an IRA unit fired shots at a British Army observation post at Girdwood barracks, off the Antrim Road, Belfast. British security forces returned fire but no hits were claimed.
  - an IRA unit fired shots at a British Army observation post atop of a block of flats in the New Lodge area of Belfast.
  - a blast bomb was thrown at Mountpottinger RUC station, Belfast. It bounced off a wall and hit a house before exploding.
- 5 March 1991:
  - the IRA bombed Short Brothers aircraft factory at Queen's Island, east Belfast.
  - a Semtex bomb hidden in a telegraph pole with a command wire leading to a nearby house was found by British security forces in Upper Meadow Street, Belfast.
- 7 March 1991: an IRA unit carried out a gun and blast bomb attack against a security sangar at the Belfast Law Courts.
- 9 March 1991:
  - an IRA revenge attack targeting senior Loyalists in Portadown, County Armagh believed to be responsible for the Cappagh killings was foiled by the RUC. Three men dressed in boiler suits were arrested in a car intercepted in the Lurgan area.
  - an IRA unit threw a blast bomb at North Howard Street RUC base, Belfast, followed by a burst of gunfire.
  - IRA snipers fired shots at North Queen Street RUC base, Belfast
  - a gunman fired several shots at an RUC patrol in the Suffolk area of Belfast.
  - drivers of four hijacked vehicles in Belfast were forced to carry suspect devices to RUC bases at Tennant Street, York Road, Springfield Parade, and Lisburn Road. The bombs were later found to be hoaxes.
- 11 March 1991: an undetonated drogue bomb was found in Townsend Street in Strabane, County Tyrone.
- 13 March 1991: an IRA sniper fired two shots at a British Army checkpoint at Gortmullan, County Fermanagh. There was another attack on the same position on 20 April.
- 14 March 1991: the IRA claimed responsibility for several shots fired at Woodburn RUC station, Belfast.
- 15 March 1991: incendiary devices damaged commercial premises in Newtownabbey, County Antrim, and Bangor County Down. Two pubs in Belfast city centre were also targeted, seriously damaging one.
- 19 March 1991: a drogue bomb attack on an RUC mobile patrol in Newry, County Down, injured two RUC officers.
- 20 March 1991:
  - the IRA fired twenty rounds at the British Army barracks in North Howard Street, Belfast.
  - an employee of Locksley Engineering was shot in the arm by IRA members in Belfast, as part of its campaign against companies which supplied security forces. After the shooting, Locksley Engineering announced that they would no longer work for the RUC or the British Army in Northern Ireland.
- 21 March 1991: twenty-eight IRA bomb hoaxes, along with real incendiary devices in shops, caused widespread disruption in Belfast and Bangor, County Down. Suspect cars were abandoned at key points causing significant traffic delays.
- 22 March 1991:
  - an IRA sniper fired ten shots at British soldiers dismantling a border checkpoint at Derryard, County Fermanagh. The same checkpoint was attacked again two days later.
  - a female RUC civilian employee, Margaret Grant, a mother of three, was shot and seriously wounded by IRA members outside the RUC headquarters in Derry. Her husband, an RUC officer, had been killed by the IRA in 1987, and the attack stirred widespread condemnation.
  - the IRA claimed responsibility for an explosive device that partially exploded at Taggart Barracks in West Belfast.
- 23 March 1991: a UDR soldier was shot and wounded by the IRA in Trillick, County Tyrone.
- 24 March 1991:
  - an IRA unit and a British Army patrol exchanged fire near Cullyhanna, County Armagh.
  - an IRA unit carried out a gun attack on British soldiers dismantling a border checkpoint at Derryvallin Road, County Fermanagh. The IRA later claimed the ASU responsible, armed with machine-guns and rifles, fired over 200 rounds.
- 25 March 1991:
  - an IRA unit fired on a joint UDR/RUC patrol near Galbally, County Tyrone. A soldier pulled a civilian motorist caught in the crossfire from her car.
  - the IRA claimed responsibility for a remote-control explosive device that partially exploded at Antrim Road, North Belfast.
- 28 March 1991:
  - a lone IRA gunman fired on British soldiers manning an observation post atop the high-rise Broadway Tower apartment block in West Belfast.
  - an IRA unit opened fire on a joint British Army-RUC patrol travelling along the Glen Road in the Andersonstown area of Belfast.
- 29 March 1991:
  - the IRA claimed responsibility for several hoax bombs left in Belfast city centre.
  - a 2 lb (0.91 kg) Semtex bomb hidden under a traffic cone was defused in Blackwatertown, County Tyrone. The IRA stated that the unit who planted the device had been forced to disarm and abort the operation.
- 4 April 1991: the IRA exploded a 1,000 lb (450 kg) van bomb outside the courthouse in the centre of Banbridge, County Down, causing extensive damage and injuring an RUC officer.
- 5 April 1991:
  - a 300 lb (140 kg) IRA bomb left outside an RUC station at Pomeroy, County Tyrone failed to explode. The IRA unit who planted the bomb fired several shots as they withdrew.
  - a number of incendiary devices were planted by the IRA in the Arndale Shopping Centre, Manchester, England. They were discovered and defused.
  - a British army patrol was left unharmed by an explosion at Cregan near Crossmaglen, County Armagh.
- 6 April 1991: an off-duty RUC officer (Spence McGarry) was killed when he triggered a booby-trap bomb attached to his car by the IRA in Ballycastle, County Antrim. The explosion caused the car to burst into flames and roll down a hill where it hit another vehicle which also burst into flames.
- 7 April 1991: an IRA unit threw two drogue bombs at a British security forces patrol Oldpark area of Belfast. The following day two boys were injured, one seriously, after one of the devices exploded.
- 8 April 1991:
  - a proxy bomb attack took place at the RUC/British Army base at Belleek, County Fermanagh. A female RUC civilian employee was forced to drive to the gate sangar of the barracks carrying an explosive device in her handbag. The sentry raised the alarm and the area was evacuated. The sangar was heavily damaged by the explosion.
  - an IRA sniper fired a single shot at a British soldier in the back of a patrol vehicle at the Riverdale Estate in the Andersonstown area of Belfast.
  - the IRA fired six shots at a British Army mobile patrol behind the Whiterock Leisure Centre, West Belfast.
- 9 April 1991: a Protestant civilian, Derek Ferguson, a builder, was shot dead by the IRA at his mobile home on Aughaveagh Road, Coagh, County Tyrone. Ferguson was a cousin of a prominent Unionist politician, Rev William McCrea.
- 10 April 1991:
  - an IRA bomb alert forced the cancellation of a visit to Carrickmore, County Tyrone by Stormont Industry Minister Richard Needham for the launch of a jobs scheme.
  - the IRA carried out an unsuccessful mortar attack on Dungannon RUC station.
  - an IRA mortar launcher failed to detonate in Castlederg, County Tyrone.
  - an IRA volunteer (Colm Marks) was shot dead by the RUC while he was preparing a mortar bomb in Downpatrick, County Down. Another IRA volunteer escaped.
- 12 April 1991:
  - a Protestant man, David Jameson, was seriously injured by a booby-trap bomb in Portadown, County Armagh. The IRA claimed he was a member of the UVF. In 1980 Jameson, then a UDR soldier, had been charged with loaning his legally-held pistol to the UVF and also robbery and hijacking. The man's brother, Richard Jameson, was a senior member of the UVF before being killed in a Loyalist feud in January 2000.
  - an unexploded blast bomb was neutralised by the British Army near Clady permanent vehicle checkpoint, County Tyrone.
- 13 April 1991:
  - the IRA shot dead Ian Sproule outside his parents' home, Liskleen Road, Killen, Castlederg, County Tyrone. The dead man had reportedly been listed as a UVF member in Garda Síochána files that the IRA had obtained; the documents reportedly indicated that Sproule was wanted in connection with firebomb attacks on premises in Ballybofey, Letterkenny and Castlefin in 1987. The attacks had been claimed by the UFF. CAIN lists Sproule as a civilian.
  - an off-duty RUC officer (Samuel McCrum) was shot dead by the IRA at his wife's shop, Antrim Street, Lisburn, County Antrim. His funeral a few days later was delayed by IRA bomb hoaxes in Rathfriland.
  - an IRA bomb targeting British security forces planted in Claudy, County Tyrone, failed to detonate.
  - following IRA threats, a Belfast-based electrical distributor announced it would no longer be carrying out contracts for the British security forces.
- 14 April 1991: an IRA unit ambushed a joint British Army/RUC patrol in Strabane, County Tyrone. No reported injuries.
- 15 April 1991: a Semtex and petrol IRA bomb targeting British security forces planted in Newry failed to detonate.
- 16 April 1991:
  - an IRA unit fired on a British security forces mobile patrol on Stewartstown Road, Belfast.
  - the IRA bombed Shorts Aircraft factory in Belfast. No reported injuries. A second device was neutralised by the British Army in a controlled explosion.
- 19 April 1991: the IRA shot and wounded an alleged member of the Ulster Freedom Fighters on the Springfield Road, Belfast.
- 20 April 1991:
  - the British Army checkpoint at Gortmullan, County Fermanagh, was fired on by the IRA for the second time in a month. Members of the Duke of Edinburgh's Royal Regiment returned fire with a .50 heavy machine gun, the first time such a weapon was known to have been used by the British Army in the Troubles. The observation post was hit. One soldier was wounded and evacuated by helicopter.
  - the IRA claimed to have uncovered and attacked a makeshift observation post manned by two undercover British soldiers near Cappagh, County Tyrone. An IRA statement said two units armed with assault rifles and a GPMG fired two hundred rounds at the position.
- 22 April 1991: the IRA announced if Loyalist paramilitaries ceased their attacks they would responded.
- 24 April 1991: a lone IRA gunman fired several shots at an RUC foot patrol in the Short Strand area of Belfast.
- 25 April 1991:
  - a small IRA bomb exploded on the seventh floor of the Europa hotel, Belfast.
  - a primed IRA horizontal mortar was discovered in Derry.
- 26 April 1991: the IRA fired a Mark-12 horizontal mortar at the RUC base in Carrickmore, County Tyrone.
- 29 April 1991:
  - the IRA shot at three alleged Loyalists at Cullenrammer Road near Dungannon, County Tyrone. The IRA claimed the garage was hosting a UVF meeting.
  - an explosion outside Tennent Street RUC caused minor damage to a parked vehicle.

=== May–June ===
- 1 May 1991:
  - an RUC patrol vehicle was hit by an IRA rocket on Mica Drive, Beechmount, Belfast. Several shots were then fired at the vehicle and others in the convoy. Three officers were badly injured. An RUC Sergeant (Stephen Gillespie) died two days later.
  - the managing director of a Belfast-based company escaped injury in an IRA booby-trap bomb attack. Three days later the firm announced they would no longer carry out any work for British security forces.
- 2 May 1991: the IRA fired a horizontal mortar at an armoured RUC patrol car near Omagh, County Tyrone. The device failed to detonate on impact.
- 3 May 1991:
  - the British Army defused a 5 lb (2.3 kg) Semtex bomb and an incendiary device abandoned in a car on the Antrim Road, Belfast.
  - an IRA mortar attack on the RUC barracks at Middletown, County Armagh, caused some damage to the perimeter fence.
- 6 May 1991: the British Army defused a 500 lb (230 kg) bomb buried under a sheep pen in County Down, after repeated hoax calls about a bomb at nearby Spelga Reservoir.
- 7 May 1991: a 2 lb (0.91 kg) Semtex bomb was thrown at a British security forces patrol in West Belfast and failed to explode. Later, a passing car drove over and crushed the unexploded device.
- 8 May 1991:
  - a UDR soldier escaped injury when an IRA booby-trap bomb exploded in Banbridge, County Down.
  - the IRA was responsible for several bomb hoaxes in Belfast.
- 10 May 1991: an IRA member fired several shots at a British Army patrol as they left Whiterock security forces base on the Upper Springfield Road. The IRA claimed they hit a British soldier.
- 11 May 1991:
  - a booby-trap bomb planted on the farm of a UDR soldier near Cookstown, County Tyrone, was discovered by his ten-year-old son.
  - an IRA unit carried out a blast bomb attack against civilian contractors working at Coalisland RUC station, County Tyrone.
  - the IRA sprayed the stately home of Lord Caledon with gunfire in Caledon, County Tyrone. The IRA claimed that British soldiers guarding the house were the target and the unit involved had fired over seven hundred rounds.
- 13 May 1991:
  - a former RUC officer (Robert Orr) was killed when an IRA booby-trap bomb exploded underneath his car as he drove along The Mall in Armagh town.
  - an IRA unit fired several shots at civilian contractors working on the Belfast Law Courts.
- 15 May 1991: an IRA unit fired over fifty shots at contractors dismantling an observation tower inside Carrickmore RUC base, County Tyrone.
- 16 May 1991:
  - a couple, both RUC officers, and their baby son escaped injury after an IRA incendiary device started a fire at their home in Lisburn, County Antrim. A secondary device, containing 1 lb (0.45 kg) of Semtex, wasn't detonated because they fled out the front door rather than the side.
  - the IRA detonated a 3 lb (1.4 kg) Semtex bomb in the headquarters of the Crown Prosecution Service in Queen Street, Belfast. Eight people were injured.
- 17 May 1991:
  - an RUC checkpoint at Belfast Central Station was fired upon by IRA members from a hijacked Housing Executive van. Afterwards the vehicle escaped into the nearby Markets area.
  - an RUC officer (Douglas Carruthers) was killed by a booby trap bomb attached to his car while driving near his home, Mullybritt, Lisbellaw, County Fermanagh.
- 19 May 1991: a lone IRA member fired on a British Army patrol in Ladbrook Drive in the Ardoyne area of Belfast.
- 20 May 1991: the IRA carried out a gun and rocket attack on an RUC patrol vehicle in the Unity Flats area of Belfast. The IRA claimed afterwards the two rockets were fired from a new improvised launcher.
- 21 May 1991:
  - the IRA fired an RPG rocket at a security sangar at Toomebridge RUC station, County Antrim. The unit involved then fired sixty shots at the base. There were no reported injuries.
  - the IRA shot dead businessman Wallace McVeigh at his premises, Balmoral Market, Boucher Road, Belfast. McVeigh owned a fruit and vegetable firm and had been warned previously to cease supplying British security forces.
- 22 May 1991: a bomb exploded in a litter bin close to Castle Court shopping centre in Belfast, an hour after a visit by economy minister Richard Needham. A woman was injured by the blast.
- 23 May 1991:
  - a 2 lb (0.91 kg) pressure-pad bomb was defused outside a kitchen furniture store in Coagh, County Tyrone.
  - an IRA unit fired up to forty shots at Woodbourne RUC station, Belfast.
- 24 May 1991:
  - the IRA lobbed a blast bomb at Castlederg RUC station, County Tyrone.
  - the IRA lobbed a blast bomb at Lurgan RUC station, County Armagh.
  - a 1 lb (0.45 kg) Semtex under-car booby-trap bomb was defused after falling off a car belonging to a member of the security forces in Enniskillen, County Fermanagh.
  - a British soldier and a civilian were wounded in an IRA close-range shotgun attack in the New Lodge area of Belfast.
  - an RUC Chief Inspector was shot and seriously wounded in an IRA gun attack at his home near Enniskillen, County Fermanagh. An RUC bodyguard in the vicinity opened fire.
- 25 May 1991:
  - a British soldier (Terence O'Neill) was killed when the IRA tossed a bomb into North Howard Street British Army Base, West Belfast, from an adjoining derelict building. Another soldier lost both of his legs in the attack. The IRA claimed that they used a new type of grenade.
  - an RUC officer (Edward Spence) was shot in an IRA ambush in Lower Crescent, Belfast. IRA volunteers ambushed the patrol at close range with handguns. The RUC officer was shot 5 times. A nearby UDR patrol returned fire but the IRA unit escaped. The constable died of his wounds on 27 May.
- 26 May 1991: two RUC officers were injured when a 300 lb (140 kg) IRA van bomb exploded in a Protestant housing area at Cookstown, County Tyrone; 130 houses were damaged. The IRA stated they had left the bomb outside the home of an RUC officer and the attack was retaliation for "ongoing harassment of Tyrone nationalists by the RUC".
- 28 May 1991:
  - the IRA carried out a blast bomb attack on New Barnsley RUC base in West Belfast.
  - IRA members opened fire on the car of a Protestant woman in Pomeroy, County Tyrone. The IRA said afterwards she had been delivering milk to a joint RUC/British Army base. This claim was later denied by her son.
- 29 May 1991:
  - an IRA booby-trap bomb hidden in a wall in West Belfast was defused. An IRA unit had allegedly taken an elderly woman captive in her home to lure British security forces into an ambush. This was denied by the IRA.
- 31 May 1991: Glenanne barracks bombing: Three UDR soldiers (Paul Blakely, Robert Crozier, and Sydney Hamilton) were killed, and as many as 40 others injured to varying degrees, after the IRA detonated a lorry-bomb packed with 2,500 lb (1,100 kg) of explosives outside Glenanne British Army Base near Mount Norris, County Armagh. A 60-metre-deep crater was left by the blast, and most of the livestock in surrounding farms were killed.
- 2 June 1991:
  - a small bomb was defused by the British Army at Washing Bay near Coalisland, County Tyrone, following an IRA warning.
  - a female civil servant (Celia Gourley) was injured outside her home in County Antrim by a booby-trap planted under her car. Her legs were blown off and later replaced with prosthetics. The IRA later called the attack "a mistake".
  - an unexploded Semtex blast bomb was found and defused at the perimeter fence of the RUC base in Stewartstown, County Tyrone by British security forces.
- 3 June 1991:
  - a stationery contractor in Belfast announced they would cease supplying the British Army and RUC following IRA threats.
  - an IRA time bomb exploded in the tea room at a British security forces contractor's yard at the Ballyrobbin Road, Antrim. There were no reported injuries.
  - an IRA mortar attack on St Angelo British Army base outside Enniskillen failed. Five of the six mortar bombs detonated on the back of the hijacked lorry, causing extensive damage to the sawmill it had been left at.
  - three IRA volunteers (Lawrence McNally, Michael "Pete" Ryan, and Tony Doris) were killed in an ambush by an SAS unit at Coagh, County Tyrone. The British Army stated that the IRA volunteers had been intercepted on their way to an attack. More than 200 rounds were fired at the car.
  - a device containing 2 lb (0.91 kg) of explosives was defused by the British Army in the Melmore Road area of Strabane, County Tyrone, following an IRA warning.
- 4 June 1991: the IRA detonated a 500 lb (230 kg) bomb as a British Army foot patrol passed in Crossmaglen, County Armagh. The explosion caused extensive damage to nearby houses but there were no reported injuries.
- 6 June 1991:
  - the IRA killed an IRA member (Ruairi Finnis) in Derry as an alleged informer.
  - an IRA unit lobbed a blast bomb at a British Army foot patrol near Springfield Road RUC station, Belfast.
  - an IRA unit lobbed a blast bomb at a RUC mobile patrol in the Short Strand area of Belfast.
- 7 June 1991: an IRA unit fired several shots at Oldpark RUC station in North Belfast.
- 9 June 1991: the IRA exploded a 600 lb (270 kg) car bomb in the centre of a Protestant housing estate in Donaghcloney, County Down. Several homes were destroyed. The IRA claimed the estate was "densely populated by RUC personnel" and the attack was retaliation for "destructive" raids and security forces' harassment in Nationalist areas.
- 10 June 1991: the IRA released a statement saying it was forced to abort a bomb attack on British security forces in Caledon, County Tyrone, and gave the location of the abandoned device.
- 11 June 1991:
  - the IRA sent hoax bombs to the homes of seven alleged RUC officers in towns surrounding Belfast following hoax warnings naming the officers sent to their respective RUC station the previous night.
  - the IRA claimed responsibility for several hoax bombs at road junctions and security forces' bases in Belfast over a 48-hour period.
- 17 June 1991: a UDR soldier (Brian Lawrence) was shot dead by the IRA at his workplace, a tyre depot, Duncrue Street, Belfast. An IRA unit ambushed his car using an AKM rifle and a .357 Magnum handgun. He was shot 7 times in the neck and body. His funeral two days later was disrupted by three IRA hoax bombs.
- 18 June 1991: a 300 lb (140 kg) bomb exploded outside Pomeroy RUC station, County Tyrone. The IRA later warned a second bomb had failed to explode.
- 19 June 1991:
  - an IRA unit lobbed a blast bomb into Donegall Pass RUC station from a hijacked vehicle. One RUC officer suffered minor injuries.
  - a British soldier (Anthony Harrison) was shot dead by the IRA while off-duty at his girlfriend's home, Nevis Avenue, Strandtown, Belfast. Martin McGartland (an informant later shot and badly wounded by the IRA) alleged that he drove the getaway car.
  - two civilians were slightly injured after the IRA fired a rocket from an improvised launcher at RUC officers in the Shipquay Street area of Derry city centre.
- 21 June 1991:
  - four RUC officers were injured after a bomb was thrown at their patrol vehicle in the Mountpottinger area of East Belfast.
  - the IRA launched two mortars at British Army personnel closing a border crossing point at Atladavin near Clogher, County Tyrone. The IRA claimed one device exploded.
- 23 June 1991: the IRA fired a rocket at British Army personnel closing the border at Greagh Crossing on the Tyrone/Monaghan border.
- 25 June 1991: the IRA claimed to have fire hundreds of rounds in a heavy machine gun attack on a UDR checkpoint near Ballygawley, County Tyrone.
- 26 June 1991:
  - an IRA mortar attack on Crossmaglen British Army base caused no injuries.
  - two blast bombs were thrown at RUC officers outside the Queen Street RUC station in Belfast, injuring 20 people. A pair of suspected IRA members were arrested in the aftermath.
- 27 June 1991:
  - an IRA unit carried out a gun and grenade attack on a British Army mobile patrol at the junction of Lanark Way and Springfield Road, Belfast. The IRA claimed they again used a new type of improvised disposable grenade launcher.
  - an IRA bomb planted at rear of the Beck Theatre in London failed to explode during a performance by the British Army's Blues and Royals band and was defused by bomb disposal experts the next morning.
- 29 June 1991:
  - Ulster Democratic Party member and UDA/UFF commander Cecil McKnight was shot dead by the IRA in the Waterside area of Derry City. The IRA claimed he had been involved in the assassination of Sinn Féin Councillor Eddie Fullerton. The IRA unit were pursued by the RUC after the shooting but escaped after they opened fire on an RUC patrol car.
  - a joint British Army/RUC patrol escaped injury in an IRA rocket attack at Altadavin, outside Clogher, County Tyrone.
- 30 June 1991: the IRA fired a horizontal mortar at an RUC patrol car in Omagh, County Tyrone. One RUC officer was injured and four civilians were treated for shock.

=== July–August ===
- 1 July 1991:
  - an IRA bomb left behind an RAF careers office in Preston, England was defused.
  - a 200 lb (90 kg) IRA car bomb was defused after partly exploding at a garage in Dungannon, County Tyrone. The device was in a car hijacked earlier at gunpoint near the village of Cappagh, County Tyrone. The same garage had seen several previous IRA attacks.
  - the IRA carried out a coffee jar bomb attack on a British Army foot patrol at Donore Court in the New Lodge area of Belfast. The IRA claimed they injured a British soldier.
- 4 July 1991:
  - an IRA unit fired several bursts of automatic gunfire at British security forces manning the security perimeter surrounding the Belfast Law Courts.
  - an IRA unit fired an improvised grenade at an observation post at Mountpottinger RUC base in the Short Strand area of Belfast.
  - the IRA launched a mortar attack on Cloghogue permanent vehicle checkpoint outside Newry on the main Dublin-Belfast road but fell short.
- 5 July 1991: a blast bomb was thrown at a British security forces patrol on the Monagh Bypass, Belfast.
- 7 July 1991:
  - an IRA coffee jar bomb attack on an RUC mobile patrol injured three RUC officers and three civilians on the Oldpark Road, North Belfast.
  - IRA prisoners Nessan Quinlivan and Pearse McAuley escaped from HM Prison Brixton, where they were being held on remand. They escaped using a gun that had been smuggled into the prison, wounding a motorist as they fled.
  - an IRA volunteer was shot and injured after throwing a coffee jar bomb at an RUC mobile patrol in Spamount Street, Belfast. Three RUC officers and a civilian were also injured.
- 8 July 1991:
  - an IRA coffee jar bomb attack on an RUC mobile patrol injured four RUC officers in the Antrim Road area of Belfast.
  - an IRA time bomb attack injured two RUC officers and demolished a civilian's home in Dunmurray, Belfast.
  - an IRA unit lobbed a coffee jar bomb over the perimeter wall of Mountpottinger RUC base in the Strand Road area of Belfast.
  - an IRA attack was foiled after Gardaí in Donegal found a 1,000 lb (450 kg) bomb. Three suspects were arrested. The bomb was loaded onto the trailer of an articulated lorry with a driver's cab cladded in improvised armour. The hydraulics had been modified to allow the driver to quickly disengage the trailer and activate a short timer for the bomb. The IRA stated their plan was to drive the vehicle into the heart of a border checkpoint and abandon the payload before quickly withdrawing.
  - an IRA unit fired several shots at an observation post at Oldpark RUC station in Belfast.
  - an IRA unit fired several shots at a British Army observation on top of a high-rise apartment block in the New Lodge area of Belfast.
- 11 July 1991:
  - the IRA launched several gun attacks on RUC officers in the New Lodge area of Belfast during unrest surrounding the annual Orange Order 12 July parades. The RUC later reported they had come under "heavy gunfire".
  - an IRA unit and a British Army mobile patrol exchanged fire at Divis Drive in the Falls Road area of Belfast. The IRA unit launched an RPG rocket.
  - an IRA unit opened fire on a large RUC patrol leaving North Queen Street RUC station.
- 12 July 1991:
  - the IRA carried out a coffee jar bomb attack against a British Army mobile patrol in the New Lodge area of Belfast.
  - an IRA unit opened fire on a joint British Army-RUC mobile patrol in the Grosvenor Road area of Belfast.
  - an IRA member suffered "severe" hand injuries arising from a botched bomb attack on New Barnsley RUC base, West Belfast.
- 14 July 1991: an IRA sniper fired two shots at a British Army patrol outside the RUC base in Pomeroy, County Tyrone.
- 18 July 1991:
  - an IRA unit lobbed two blast bombs at the security barrier beside Strand Road RUC station in Derry, one failed to explode. Three RUC officers were treated for shock afterwards.
  - the British Army defused a small IRA bomb left in a bank on Royal Avenue in Belfast city centre. An IRA member had entered the premises with the device and told staff they had ten minutes to evacuate.
- 19 July 1991: the IRA fired an SA-7 surface-to-air missile at a RAF Wessex helicopter at Kinawley in County Fermanagh. The missile failed to lock onto the helicopter and exploded on the ground. The IRA claimed they had instead fired an RPG-7 and a 12.7mm machine gun.
- 20 July 1991: an unexploded coffee jar bomb was found by an RUC patrol in Strabane, County Tyrone, and later defused by the British Army.
- 21 July 1991: the IRA shot dead a County Louth farmer (Thomas Oliver) who they claimed was an informer for the Garda Síochána in Dundalk.
- 26 July 1991:
  - an IRA unit carried out a coffee jar bomb attack against a British security forces foot patrol in Stewarts Street in South Belfast.
  - an IRA unit, the same responsible for the Stewarts Street attack, opened fire on UDR soldiers on duty near the Belfast Law Courts.
- 27 July 1991: an IRA bomb was found attached to the bottom of a UDR soldier's car in County Tyrone. The device was intended to explode after the part-time soldier drove into Dungannon UDR base.
- 28 July 1991: a 5 lb (2.3 kg) Semtex blast bomb was dropped on an RUC convoy from the M1 motorway bridge as it drove along Black's Road. There were no reported injuries.
- 31 July 1991: the IRA claimed responsibility for hoax car bombs at British security bases in West Belfast and the city centre.
- 1 August 1991: the IRA tried to kill a UDR soldier at his home in the Tigers Bay area of North Belfast. After failing to gain entry the unit involved fired several shots through a downstairs window.
- 2 August 1991:
  - an IRA unit launched an improvised grenade at a British security forces patrol on the Antrim Road, Belfast.
  - the IRA carried out a blast bomb attack against a joint British Army/RUC patrol on the Springfield Road, Belfast. The patrol fired several shots. A civilian was hospitalised with minor injuries resulting from the blast.
  - the IRA targeted an RAF Puma landing British soldiers at Newtownhamilton barracks, South Armagh, with what author Chris Ryder describes as three "radio controlled warheads", whose explosions around the landing area forced the pilot to lift off. The next day, ordnance disposal teams found that the missiles were Mark-12 horizontal mortars, fired from a garage in the town center.
- 3 August 1991:
  - the IRA launched a rocket at an observation post at North Howard Street joint British Army-RUC base, Belfast. There were no reported injuries.
  - an IRA unit lobbed blast bombs at the perimeter fence of a British Army base in Banbridge, County Down. There were no reported injuries.
  - the IRA fired a Semtex grenade at Rosemount RUC station, Derry. The device failed to explode and was neutralised by the British Army.
- 5 August 1991:
  - a former UDR soldier, Eric Boyd, was shot dead by the IRA shortly after leaving his workplace, while driving along Altmore Road, Cappagh, County Tyrone. The IRA claimed he was a member of the UVF.
  - the IRA tried to kill an alleged UVF member at his home in the Oldpark area of Belfast but he wasn't present.
- 8 August 1991:
  - an informant (Martin McGartland) was kidnapped by the IRA in Belfast after the RUC intercepted two couriers delivering guns for an attack planned on a pub in Bangor, County Down, patronised by British soldiers. He was being interrogated in a flat when he managed to escape by jumping out of a third floor window.
  - The IRA reported firing up to thirty shots at contractors working on a new RUC base at Lisnagelvin in the Waterside area of Derry. Contrarily, the RUC said they had received no reports of a shooting incident.
- 9 August 1991:
  - Ulster Democratic Party member and UDA/UFF member Gary Lynch was shot dead by the IRA in Lisahally, County Londonderry. Lynch had been a pall bearer at the funeral of senior UDP and UDA/UFF member Cecil McKnight who was shot dead by the IRA two months earlier.
  - an IRA unit fired several shots at a joint British Army-RUC patrol in Alliance Avenue, Ardoyne, Belfast.
  - three RUC officers were injured when their patrol vehicle was struck by a bomb in the Ardoyne area of Belfast.
- 10 August 1991:
  - an RUC patrol was attacked with a blast bomb in the Short Strand area of Belfast. No one was injured in the attack but an 86-year-old woman had to be treated for shock.
  - an IRA unit fired six shots at an RUC patrol in the Tiger's Bay area of Belfast from the New Lodge Road, but in a later statement claimed they had aborted a grenade attack because of the presence of civilians.
- 11 August 1991:
  - an IRA unit fired on a joint British Army-RUC patrol in the Duncairn Gardens area of Belfast.
- 12 August 1991:
  - an IRA unit fired on a British security forces patrol at Mountpottinger RUC station, East Belfast.
- 13 August 1991:
  - an IRA unit fired several shots at Girdwood Barracks, North Belfast.
  - an IRA unit fired several shots at a British Army observation post at the top of a high-rise apartment block in the New Lodge area of Belfast.
  - the IRA stated they had accidentally discharged a grenade while providing cover for aborted punishment attacks in Fathom Park, Newry.
- 14 August 1991: an IRA unit lobbed a blast bomb and fired several shots at an RUC mobile patrol in the Shantallow area of Derry.
- 15 August 1991:
  - the IRA was responsible for forty bomb alerts in the Belfast area causing widespread disruption. All were declared hoaxes, except a bomb that exploded on a bus in Donegall Square East in Belfast city centre. The Sprucefield shopping centre in Lisburn was evacuated and the British Army carried out a controlled explosion on a car.
  - a Catholic civilian (James Woods) was killed and a number of British soldiers wounded when the IRA launched a grenade attack on a British Army foot patrol, off Gortfin Street, Falls, Belfast.
  - a former UDR soldier (Ronald Finlay) was shot dead by the IRA at his workplace, a farm at Brocklass Road, Sion Mills, County Tyrone.
  - the IRA attacked British security forces responding to hoax bomb alerts at Henry Taggart base in the New Barnsley area of Belfast. The IRA claimed they injured a British soldier. The RUC did not report any injuries, but stated fire was returned.
  - the IRA fired several shots at a joint British Army-RUC foot patrol at Oldpark RUC base in North Belfast.
  - the IRA attacked British security forces responding to hoax bomb alerts at Fort Whiterock on the edge of the Turf Lodge estate in West Belfast.
  - an IRA unit fired several shots at a British Army observation post at Broadway Towers in West Belfast. Soldiers returned fire.
  - an IRA unit fired several shots at Woodbourne RUC base in West Belfast.
  - the IRA carried out a gun and grenade attack against RUC officers during rioting at the Yorkgate shopping complex in North Queen Street, Belfast.
  - there were two gun attacks on joint British Army-RUC foot patrols in Horn Drive in the Suffolk area of Belfast. Later, two blast bombs thrown at a joint British Army-RUC patrol failed to explode.
  - the IRA carried out a blast bomb attack against Strand Road RUC station, Derry.
- 16 August 1991:
  - the IRA fired shots at British security forces at the Law Courts in Chichester Street in Belfast city centre.
  - the IRA launched a horizontal mortar at an RUC mobile patrol in the Cathedral Road area of Armagh city. The device failed to detonate properly on impact.
  - the IRA lobbed a coffee jar bomb into Ballynafeigh RUC base in East Belfast.
- 17 August 1991:
  - a British soldier (Simon Ware) was killed when the IRA detonated a 300 lb (140 kg) landmine as a British Army patrol passed near Carrickrovaddy, Cullyhanna, County Armagh.
  - an IRA coffee jar job thrown at a home in Castlederg, County Tyrone, failed to detonate and was neutralised by the British Army.
- 18 August 1991: the IRA launched a mortar at the British Army position on Bishop Street, Derry.
- 19 August 1991: an IRA unit in a vehicle heading to kill an RUC employee were ambushed by RUC officers in Boucher Crescent in West Belfast. The RUC shot one IRA member as he attempted to escape.
- 20 August 1991:
  - the IRA launched an RPG rocket and fired several shots at a British security forces mobile patrol on the Springfield Road, Belfast.
  - the IRA carried out simultaneous gun attacks against Donegall Pass RUC station and the Belfast Law Courts.
- 21 August 1991:
  - a coffee jar bomb thrown into Ballynafeigh RUC station, off the Ormeau Road, Belfast caused no reported injuries.
- 22 August 1991:
  - the IRA fired a grenade at a British Army patrol in the Ballymurphy area of West Belfast; the projectile overshot the soldiers and hit the roof of a house nearby. A young girl in the vicinity was showered with debris but reportedly escaped serious injury.
  - the IRA carried out a bombing against the RUC base at Kilrea, County Londonderry using a 200 lb device. More than a hundred homes and businesses were damaged in the blast.
  - the IRA attempted to kill an alleged loyalist at Ballysillan, north Belfast.
- 23 August 1991:
  - the IRA was responsible for thirty bomb alerts in Belfast.
  - two blast bombs were thrown at Dunmurray RUC station in South Belfast. Twenty homes were evacuated while British troops searched the area.
  - a bomb containing 1 lb (0.45 kg) of Semtex was thrown at a British security forces patrol in the centre of Derry. There was no reported damage or injuries.
- 26 August 1991: a coffee jar exploded at Fern Road in the Galliagh area of Derry. A second device was later neutralised by the British Army. The RUC claimed the first device exploded after being handled by a civilian.
- 28 August 1991:
  - the IRA lobbed a coffee jar bomb at New Barnsley RUC base, Belfast. It failed to explode.
  - the IRA carried out a blast bomb attack against a British Army patrol in Flax Street in the Ardoyne area of Belfast.
  - the IRA carried out a blast bomb attack against a joint British Army-RUC patrol in Copperfield Street in the New Lodge area of Belfast. The IRA claimed they had intercepted radio traffic confirming injuries.
  - a 1,000 lb explosive device planted by the IRA in Markethill, County Armagh, destroyed an RUC base and damaged in different degree all the buildings of the village, some of them beyond repair. A great deal of livestock was killed.
- 29 August 1991: three IRA incendiary devices were defused in a London underground depot near Hammersmith.
- 30 August 1991: an IRA unit threw a coffee jar bomb at an RUC mobile patrol in the Suffolk Road near Woodbourne RUC station, Belfast.
- 31 August 1991: an IRA incendiary device was found and defused in a bookshop on Charing Cross Road, London.

=== September–October ===
- 2 September 1991: the IRA carried out a gun and blast bomb attack against UDR soldiers and RUC officers at the gates of the security perimeter surrounding the Belfast Law Courts.
- 3 September 1991:
  - two houses were damaged when a blast bomb thrown at an RUC station on the York Road, Belfast, fell short.
  - the IRA tested a new type of bomb in County Fermanagh. An 8,000 lb (3,600 kg) bomb was loaded onto an unmanned tractor and trailer near Rosslea and driven by proxy towards a hill overlooking a British Army outpost. The hostage then would let the vehicle to roll down toward the compound, but the attack failed when the massive bomb caused the tractor to overturn. A more sophisticated remotely delivered bomb would later be used in other bombings on British Army installations in County Armagh, such as the attack on Cloghoge checkpoint.
- 4 September 1991: seven business premises in the Belfast area were damaged by incendiary devices; a department store in Castle Court centre in the city centre, three textile and furnishing shops in Newtownabbey and two more on the Shore Road, and a supermarket in Lisburn. The IRA claimed they planted a total of 14 incendiary devices.
- 5 September 1991:
  - the IRA lobbed a Semtex bomb at the observation post at Donegall Pass RUC station. Afterwards RUC officers were lured to a 8 lb (3.6 kg) car bomb timed to go off 30 minutes later by an abandoned improvised rocket launcher. The IRA claimed they injured RUC officers in both stages of the attack.
  - an IRA unit carried out a blast bomb attack in Dominic Street, Newry, but the device failed to detonate.
- 6 September 1991:
  - the IRA drove a 300 lb (140 kg) bomb in a pick-up truck against the perimeter fence of the joint RUC-British Army base in Belcoo, County Fermanagh. The British Army later defused the device. Reportedly several shots were fired at the station also.
  - the IRA detonated a 27 lb (12 kg) bomb at the outer wall of North Howard Street base, Belfast. The device had been accompanied by several hoax bombs in the area.
  - the IRA abandoned a hoax bomb outside Fort Whiterock, Belfast. Several shots were also fired at the base.
  - the IRA carried out several gun and bomb attacks involving hoax bombs at security forces bases in Belfast.
- 8 September 1991:
  - six people were injured when an IRA mortar bomb missed an RUC station and struck a pizzeria in Warrenpoint, County Down.
  - an RUC base came under sustained mortar and machine gun fire at Carrickmore, County Tyrone from a dozen-strong IRA unit. RUC officers returned fire and the gun battle lasted ten minutes.
  - the IRA claimed they placed a 1.5 lb (0.68 kg) Semtex bomb under the car of an alleged UDA/UFF commander at Roslyn Street in the Ravenhill area of Belfast. The device was discovered and defused.
- 9 September 1991:
  - the British Army-RUC base in Crossmaglen came under sustained fire from a twenty-strong IRA unit. The IRA claimed the engagement lasted half an hour and British soldiers returned fire.
  - the IRA bombed Short Brothers aircraft factory for the seventh time in two years.
- 10 September 1991:
  - a UVF member (John Hanna) was shot dead by the IRA in Donegall Road in South Belfast. A two-man IRA unit entered the house and the victim jumped from his bedroom window to escape but the IRA shot him from the window. One of the members then ran downstairs and shot Hanna again as he lay wounded; in total he was shot eight times. The suggestion that he was a UVF member was denied by his family although the man had a tattoo with the letters "UVF" on his arm and a number of UVF emblems in his bedroom.
  - the IRA forced their way into a house in Old Westland Road, North Belfast but their intended victim, an alleged loyalist, wasn't present.
  - the IRA forced their way into an apartment at Annandale Flats in South Belfast to kill the alleged South Belfast UFF commander but he escaped.
- 12 September 1991: the IRA launched a horizontal mortar at a joint British Army-RUC mobile patrol in the Norglen Parade area of Turf Lodge, Belfast. The device failed to explode on impact.
- 13 September 1991:
  - 25 lb (11 kg) left outside a bank in Dungannon, County Tyrone, was defused by the British Army after telephone warnings.
  - a 400 lb (180 kg) bomb was found and defused by British security forces near Cullyhanna, County Armagh.
  - the IRA claimed responsibility for incendiary devices which exploded in an insurance company's offices and a bar in Belfast city centre.
- 14 September 1991:
  - a teenager uncovered an IRA coffee jar bomb in place for an attack on British security forces in Banbridge, County Down. Thirty families were evacuated as the device was defused. The IRA claimed the device and another blast bomb had been thrown on 8 September.
  - a UDR soldier was "critically injured" in an IRA booby-trap bomb explosion in Newtownstewart, County Tyrone.
- 16 September 1991:
  - in separate attacks targeting Loyalists, the IRA broke into homes in Upper Charleville Street and Tildarg Avenue in Belfast. None of the intended targets were home, and in both cases shots were fired but no one was seriously injured.
  - a small drogue bomb thrown at an RUC patrol car failed to explode in Newry.
- 17 September 1991:
  - a 1,200 lb (540 kg) bomb was defused by the British Army in Newtownhamilton, County Armagh, after a patrol spotted a command wire leading from a manhole cover.
  - an RUC officer and former British soldier (Erik Clarke) was killed and several British soldiers seriously wounded when the IRA carried out a horizontal mortar attack against a joint vehicle patrol in Swatragh, County Londonderry.
- 18 September 1991:
  - the IRA was responsible for several incendiary bomb attacks on business premises in the Belfast area; a chain DIY store in South Belfast was gutted by six devices, and furniture shops on North Street and at Dunmurray were also damaged.
  - a Semtex bomb left in a bank on University Road, Belfast, caused substantial, but not structural, damage.
  - the IRA launched a gun and rocket attack on a permanent British Army checkpoint near Kinawley, County Fermanagh. Soldiers returned fire but there were reportedly no casualties.
  - an improvised grenade was launched at Willowfield RUC station, Belfast. A man was arrested after being shot and injured by RUC officers.
- 19 September 1991: a British Army contractor (John Haldane) was shot dead at his workplace in Duncrue, Belfast. A two-man IRA team, who were not wearing any masks, walked into his office and shot him twice in the chest and once in the head. Following the shooting the firm which Haldane was managing director of announced they would cease supplying British security forces.
- 20 September 1991:
  - an IRA unit fired on Mountpottinger RUC station in the Short Strand area of Belfast.
  - an IRA unit fired on UDR soldiers guarding the security perimeter around the Belfast Law Courts. Fire was returned but no hits were claimed. It was thought to be the fifteenth attack on courthouse in 1991.
- 21 September 1991: the IRA claimed to have left incendiary devices in a department store in CastleCourt shopping centre, a furniture store in Dunmurray and a furniture warehouse in Talbot Street, Belfast.
- 22 September 1991:
  - the IRA claimed responsibility for ten hoax car bombs left at British security forces bases across Belfast.
  - the IRA carried out a blast bomb attack against a British security forces patrol on the Whiterock Road, Belfast.
  - an IRA unit opened fire from a hijacked car on Girdwood UDR base.
- 23 September 1991:
  - a civilian tourist was injured in an IRA bomb attack at Lisnaskea bridge, Fermanagh. A car crossing the bridge was caught in the blast but the driver escaped unscathed. A boat club nearby was destroyed in a bomb attack.
  - two hotels in the Lisnaskea area were evacuated due to bomb hoaxes.
  - a booby-trap bomb planted under the car of a UDR soldier in Banbridge, County Down, was defused by the British Army.
  - the IRA attempted to assassinate an alleged senior Loyalist paramilitary figure in Farset Enterprise Park in the Springfield Road area of Belfast. The IRA also claimed they left a 5 lb (2.3 kg) Semtex device nearby.
  - the IRA lobbed a blast bomb at North Queen Street RUC station, Belfast. The device failed to detonate.
- 25 September 1991: a coffee jar bomb was a thrown at a British Army mobile patrol on the Springfield Road, Belfast, injuring a civilian.
- 26 September 1991:
  - two RUC officers and a civilian were injured after a drogue bomb struck an RUC patrol vehicle at Platters Mill, Coalisland, County Tyrone.
  - a British Army patrol came under fire outside Cappagh, County Tyrone. The IRA claimed they fired sixty shots.
  - an IRA unit fired on a British Army base at Whiterock Road, Belfast.
  - an IRA unit carried out a bomb attack on North Queen Street RUC station, Belfast.
  - an IRA unit carried out a bomb attack on an RUC patrol vehicle at Oldpark Road, Belfast.
- 27 September 1991:
  - the IRA launched a rocket and fired several shots at the RUC station in Bellaghy, County Londonderry.
  - the British Army defused an anti-personnel mine consisting of 7 lb (3.2 kg) of Semtex and 20 lb (9.1 kg) of shrapnel off the Springfield Road, Belfast.
- 28 September 1991: RUC officers escaped injury in a "coffee jar" bomb attack on the Antrim Road, Belfast.
- 1 October 1991: the IRA apologised to two people, Roger Earlwood (25) and his girlfriend Amanda Stewart (18) whom one of its Active Service Units knocked down and seriously injured during a get-away from a bomb attack on the British Army at Upper Dunmurray Lane. Roger Earlwood later died of his injuries.
- 5 October 1991:
  - the IRA claimed responsibility for a bomb that exploded in a pub in the Docks area of Belfast. The IRA alleged the premises was linked to the drugs trade.
  - the IRA fired several shots at a security forces base in Strabane, County Tyrone.
- 7 October 1991:
  - an IRA bomb alert disrupted the official opening of new tax offices by Secretary of State Peter Brooke in Belfast. The device, consisting of 2 lb (0.91 kg) of Semtex, was found and defused after a 15-hour search of the complex.
  - an IRA unit threw a blast bomb at an RUC mobile patrol in the St. James' area of West Belfast.
  - the IRA claimed that three incendiary devices left in the Market Street area of Armagh on 5 October had failed to explode.
  - the IRA claimed that a 30 lb (14 kg) car bomb left on the Portadown Road on the outskirts of Armagh had failed to explode. The group claimed there was a similar device beside the ring road at Callaghan's Forge.
  - the IRA claimed that a Mark 12 horizontal mortar had failed to detonate at the Loughgall roundabout outside Dungannon, County Tyrone.
- 8 October 1991: an IRA unit threw a blast bomb at an RUC vehicle in the Brandywell area of Derry.
- 9 October 1991:
  - an IRA unit threw a coffee jar bomb at Old Park RUC station, followed by a burst of gunfire.
  - proxy bombs were left outside three separate RUC stations in Belfast.
  - a 40 lb (18 kg) bomb left in the foyer of Belfast Central rail station was neutralised in a controlled detonation.
- 10 October 1991: a 350 lb (160 kg) car bomb was intercepted and defused and two people arrested on the Donegall Road, Belfast.
- 11 October 1991:
  - two RUC officers were injured after a bomb was dropped onto their patrol car from a bridge in Carnlough, County Antrim.
  - a British soldier suffered shock and hearing damage after a coffee jar bomb was thrown at troops investigating a hoax bomb in the Short Strand area of east Belfast.
  - the IRA detonated firebombs in six shops in Belfast, Bangor and Mallusk causing £1,000,000 worth of damage.
  - several shots were fired at Belleek RUC base in County Fermanagh, British soldiers returned fire.
- 12 October 1991: the British Army defused a booby-trap bomb under an RUC Reserve officer's car in Rathfriland, County Down.
- 13 October 1991:
  - a 30-strong IRA unit took over the village of Mullaghbawn in south Armagh, handing out leaflets warning of action against those involved in "anti-social activity".
  - a ten-minute gun battle erupted between British soldiers and IRA volunteers at Derryvollen, County Fermanagh during an attempt by the British Army to seize machinery from civilians re-opening a blockaded border crossing. The IRA claimed their unit was armed with two GPMGs and fired hundreds of rounds.
- 14 October 1991: an IRA attack was foiled when the RUC arrested two men with a Semtex bomb, command wire, and firing pack on the Ballymurphy Road, Belfast. A woman and two men were also arrested in a nearby house.
- 15 October 1991: the IRA launched a horizontal mortar at a British security forces mobile patrol in Castlederg, County Tyrone. The device missed.
- 17 October 1991: a coffee jar bomb was neutralised by the British Army in the vicinity of Clady permanent vehicle checkpoint, County Tyrone.
- 19 October 1991:
  - the British Army defused a booby-trap bomb under a car belonging to a member of the security forces in Lisnaskea, County Fermanagh.
  - the IRA launched a horizontal mortar at a British security forces mobile patrol in Omagh, County Tyrone. The device missed.
- 20 October 1991:
  - the IRA detonated a large roadside bomb in the vicinity of British soldiers near Silverbridge, County Armagh. There were no reported injuries.
- 21 October 1991:
  - Protestant taxi driver Alex Bunting was left with severe leg injuries after surviving an IRA bomb placed under his car in the Loyalist Sandy Row district of Belfast. A woman passenger in the car was also injured in the attack.
  - the IRA carried out a gun attack on the home of a UDR soldier in Cookstown, County Tyrone.
  - an IRA assassination attempt targeting an alleged UDA/UFF commander at his home in Highvale Gardens in west Belfast was aborted after the unit involved failed to find their target. They had to fire shots into the air to escape a hostile crowd afterwards.
  - an unexploded coffee jar bomb was defused at the rear of the RUC base in Strabane, County Tyrone.
  - British security forces defused a Semtex and shrapnel bomb after being lured to Estoril Park, Ardoyne, Belfast, by a hoax bomb call.
  - the M1 motorway was closed in County Tyrone between Stangmore and Tamnamore following the discovery of two plastic bins with wires attached. The IRA earlier warned they had abandoned a bomb in the area.
  - Toomebridge, County Antrim was cordoned-off by British security forces after the IRA said they abandoned a pair of horizontal mortars between a primary school and the RUC station.
- 22 October 1991: a 0.5 lb (0.23 kg) IRA bomb exploded at Castle Court Shopping Centre in Belfast as the Secretary of State Peter Brooke was giving a press conference a quarter of a mile away. A second 2 lb (0.91 kg) Semtex device intended to injure bomb disposal officers exploded later. There were also eight further bomb alerts, all hoaxes.
- 23 October 1991:
  - the IRA carried out a mortar attack against a British Army observation post at Silverbridge, County Armagh.
  - an IRA unit opened fire on Oldpark RUC station, Belfast.
  - an IRA unit opened fire on a security sangar at the Belfast Law Courts.
  - an IRA unit fired several shots at a British Army observation post on top of a high-rise apartment block in the New Lodge area of Belfast.
  - an IRA unit opened fire on Grosvenor Road RUC station.
  - according to an IRA statement a horizontal mortar aimed at an RUC patrol vehicle on the Tullywiggan Road in Cookstown, County Tyrone, was abandoned after failing to detonate.
- 24 October 1991:
  - the IRA claimed responsibility for several incendiary devices planted in commercial premises in the greater Belfast area.
  - an IRA unit lobbed two coffee jar bombs at a security forces patrol on Hospital Road, Newry.
- 25 October 1991: an IRA unit threw a blast bomb at an RUC patrol in Roslea, County Fermanagh. The IRA claimed a second attack was abandoned because of the presence of civilians.
- 29 October 1991:
  - IRA hoax bomb alerts caused widespread disruption during rush-hour traffic in Belfast.
  - the British Army defused a 25 lb (11 kg) Semtex bomb in an office tower in High Street, Belfast.
- 30 October 1991: an IRA unit opened fire on Oldpark RUC station, Belfast.

=== November–December ===
- 2 November 1991:
  - several IRA incendiary devices were found in Coleraine, County Londonderry.
  - an IRA incendiary device left in a bed shop on the Lisburn Road, Belfast caused extensive damage. A similar device was found in another Belfast shop premises before it could detonate.
  - the IRA planted five incendiary devices in commercial premises in Lisburn. All were discovered before they exploded.
  - British security forces escaped injury following a bomb attack in the vicinity of Spamount Road and Halliday's Road, north Belfast.
  - two British soldiers (Philip Cross and Craig Pantry) were killed when the IRA detonated a bomb at Musgrave Park British Army base in Belfast. A two-storey building in the base was destroyed by the blast. (See:Musgrave Park Hospital bombing)
- 6 November 1991:
  - a small Semtex bomb was defused at the headquarters of HM Customs and Excise department at Belfast docks.
  - the IRA fired a horizontal mortar at a four-vehicle UDR patrol in Bellaghy, County Londonderry. The mortar hit the last vehicle in the patrol, killing a UDR soldier, Michael Boxall, and wounding another.
- 7 November 1991: several incendiary devices were defused in commercial premises in Belfast.
- 8 November 1991:
  - an IRA unit carried out a gun and blast bomb attack at Mountpottinger RUC station, Short Strand, Belfast.
  - a coffee jar bomb was thrown at a joint British Army/RUC patrol in Central Drive, Creggan, Derry, but failed to explode.
  - an under-car booby trap device attached to van owned by a former RUC officer in Moy, County Tyrone, was defused by British security forces.
- 9 November 1991: two incendiary bombs were defused in a B&Q store in the Waterside area of Derry.
- 10 November 1991:
  - RUC officers escaped injury after a coffee jar bomb thrown at their patrol vehicle missed and exploded nearby in Dungannon, County Tyrone.
  - the British Army defused a 200–300 lb (91–136 kg) car bomb in Bedford Street, Belfast. The controlled explosion caused minor damage to an office building.
- 12 November 1991: the IRA fired several shots at North Queen Street RUC station, Belfast. One RUC officer was injured and several vehicles were damaged.
- 13 November 1991:
  - the IRA shot dead a UDA member (William Kingsberry) and a Red Hand Commando (Samuel Mehaffey) at their home on Lecale Street, Belfast. Two IRA volunteers armed with an AK-47 assault rifle and a 9mm pistol opened fire, hitting the UDA man at least nine times and the other man six times. A five-week-old baby was also seriously injured after being hit twice.
  - two Protestant civilians, Kenneth Lynn and Stephen Lynn, were shot dead by the IRA led while renovating their home on Upper Crumlin Road, Belfast. The house was previously owned by a UVF member and it is suspected he was the intended target.
  - a UDA man was left with serious injuries after a bomb detonated under his car in the Shankill area of Belfast.
  - the IRA tried to kill senior UDA man Joe Bratty at his Annadale Flats home but he wasn't home. It was the third attempt on his life in three weeks.
- 15 November 1991:
  - IRA volunteers Patricia Black and Frank Ryan were killed in St Albans, Hertfordshire, when their bomb detonated prematurely. A civilian was also injured.
  - IRA incendiary devices damage a shop and cinema in Belfast and a pub in Newtownards.
- 16 November 1991: a coffee jar bomb was thrown at Stewartstown RUC station, Belfast.
- 17 November 1991: the IRA fired a Mark-12 mortar at an RUC mobile patrol outside Newtownbutler, County Fermanagh.
- 19 November 1991: a 220 lb (100 kg) IRA car bomb left in Bedford Street in Belfast city centre overnight was defused by the British Army.
- 21 November 1991:
  - the IRA carried out a gun and blast bomb attack targeting British soldiers at the Belfast Law Courts.
  - an unexploded coffee jar bomb was defused in Roslea, County Fermanagh.
- 22 November 1991: an IRA unit lobbed a coffee jar bomb at a British security forces patrol on Brandywell Avenue, Derry.
- 23 November 1991:
  - IRA incendiary bombs badly damaged two clothes shops in Belfast city centre.
  - several shots were fired at a British Army patrol in Strabane, County Tyrone. The soldiers returned fire and there were no injuries. The IRA denied involvement and claimed that it was a case of friendly fire involving another British Army patrol on the far side of the River Mourne.
- 24 November 1991:
  - a UVF member (Colin Caldwell), and a UDA member (Robert Skey), were killed and eight others injured when the IRA managed to plant a bomb in a dining hall used by loyalist prisoners in Crumlin Road Prison, Belfast.
  - the British Army defused a 400 lb (180 kg) bomb buried in a ditch south of Crossmaglen, County Armagh.
- 25 November 1991: an IRA unit opened fire on North Queen Street RUC station, Belfast. The IRA claimed to have injured an RUC officer.
- 26 November 1991:
  - IRA units opened fire on Woodbourne RUC station and North Queen Street RUC station in Belfast.
  - IRA hoax bomb alerts caused widespread disruption in Belfast and Lisburn.
- 27 November 1991: a UDR soldier (Kenneth Newell) was kidnapped and shot dead by the IRA while off-duty near Crossmaglen, County Armagh. He had been making a delivery to a petrol station on the Dundalk-Castleblayney road, another man with him (unbeknownst to his captors, also a serving member of the UDR) was kidnapped and released after fourteen hours of interrogation.
- 28 November 1991:
  - an IRA bomb exploded in a dust cart in Corporation Street, Belfast, near the city's high court.
  - the IRA detonated a 100 lb (45 kg) car bomb at the rear of the Plaza Hotel in Belfast city centre during the morning, causing widespread damage to office and shop windows but only slightly injuring seven people. The bombs were accompanied by several hoax warnings.
  - the IRA detonated a bomb at a hotel in Campsie, near Derry. A second bomb, a booby-trap device, exploded minutes later.
- 29 November 1991:
  - the IRA stated they had been forced to "neutralize" a horizontal mortar after it failed to detonate as a British security forces mobile patrol passed in Newry.
  - a bomb was thrown by IRA volunteers at Coalisland RUC station, in County Tyrone.
- 30 November 1991: IRA incendiary devices gutted a shoe shop and caused minor damage to a bar in Belfast city centre.
- 1 December 1991:
  - IRA incendiary devices exploded in retail premises in Newtownabbey and Belfast, destroying £500,000 worth of stock.
  - four IRA devices exploded in separate retail premises on the Tottenham Court Road, London; there were no injuries.
  - an IRA unit lobbed a blast bomb into the RUC compound in Moneymore, County Londonderry.
- 2 December 1991:
  - a 100 lb (45 kg) IRA car bomb was defused after being abandoned in Sion Mills, County Tyrone.
  - an IRA incendiary device ignited in a Littlewoods store on Oxford Street, London.
- 3 December 1991: three incendiary devices destroyed part of a hotel near Templepatrick, County Antrim.
- 4 December 1991: a 1,200 lb (540 kg) IRA van bomb detonated on Glengall Street, Belfast severely damaging the Grand Opera House as well as the Europa Hotel and left 16 people injured.
- 5 December 1991:
  - an IRA unit lobbed a coffee jar bomb at a British Army patrol at the junction of the Falls Road and Waterford Street, Belfast.
  - an IRA carried out a blast bomb attack against a British security forces mobile patrol in Coalisland, County Tyrone.
  - over two days, the IRA claimed responsibility for several incendiary devices and hoax bombs in Belfast's Cornmarket area. The devices failed to detonate and were defused.
- 7 December 1991: at least eight incendiary devices exploded in shops, businesses, and the town hall in Blackpool, England. Another five devices were discovered unexploded. Two days later an incendiary device exploded in a menswear shop and another was discovered intact.
- 8 December 1991: seven incendiary devices exploded in the Manchester Arndale shopping centre in England, causing severe damage There were no injuries. Several more devices were discovered nearby the following day.
- 9 December 1991: the IRA attacked a British Army patrol in a close-range shotgun attack in the New Lodge area of Belfast. The IRA claimed they injured a British soldier.
- 10 December 1991:
  - the IRA launched a horizontal mortar at a British Army mobile patrol in the Twinbrook area of Belfast. The device failed to explode.
  - a soldier and an RUC officer were wounded by a 3 lb (1.4 kg) IRA Semtex bomb in Stewartstown, County Tyrone.
- 12 December 1991:
  - a 2,000 lb (910 kg) IRA truck-bomb wrecked the RUC station in Craigavon, County Armagh, injuring more than 60 people. The explosion caused extensive damage to nearby homes, a chapel, and a primary school.
  - a large IRA bomb exploded on the grounds of a vacated Territorial Army base near Derry.
- 13 December 1991: the IRA injured a British soldier in an ambush by a unit armed with rifles and machineguns near Cullyhanna, County Armagh.
- 14 December 1991:
  - six IRA incendiary bombs were discovered in the Belfast area. There was also a bomb scare at Castlecourt Shopping Centre.
  - four IRA explosive devices were discovered in Brent Cross Shopping Centre, London.
- 15 December 1991:
  - an IRA incendiary device partially exploded in the National Gallery in London.
  - an IRA unit carried out blast bomb attack against a British Security forces patrol in the Markets area of Belfast.
  - an IRA unit carried out blast bomb attack against a British Security forces patrol in the Short Strand area of Belfast.
- 16 December 1991:
  - an IRA unit carried out blast bomb attack against a British Security forces mobile patrol in the Andersonstown area of Belfast.
  - an IRA unit carried out blast bomb attack against a British Security forces patrol in the Markets area of Belfast. The IRA claimed to have injured a British soldier.
  - the IRA detonated a bomb on a railway line near Clapham Junction in England.
  - a small IRA bomb exploded at the RUC station in Saintfield, County Down. A passing motorist narrowly escaped injury.
  - a family from the Shankill Road discovered an incendiary device in a toy they had purchased in the Victoria centre, Belfast.
- 17 December 1991: a house in the Lower Falls area of Belfast was destroyed, apparently by an incendiary device inadvertently brought home from the Victoria centre.
- 18 December 1991:
  - the IRA detonated a 500 lb (230 kg) car bomb in Belfast near the Law Courts. The blast badly damaged the court house and surrounding buildings as well as dozens of cars parked in a nearby RUC station.
  - IRA incendiary bombs exploded in several Belfast-area commercial premises, destroying a carpet store. An incendiary bomb was also left in Shorts aircraft factory
  - an incendiary bomb exploded in a Dunnes Stores supermarket in Coleraine, County Londonderry.
  - between twelve and fifteen armed IRA members established checkpoints on three roads leading to Cullyhanna, County Armagh.
- 19 December 1991:
  - an IRA incendiary bomb set off in Larne, County Antrim.
  - the IRA claimed they bombed a communications centre inside a Territorial Army base on the Limavady Road, Derry.
- 21 December 1991:
  - the IRA was accused of complicity in an Irish National Liberation Army (INLA) gun attack that left a Protestant civilian (Robin Farmer) dead at his family's shop, Killyman Street, Moy. His father, a former RUC officer, was the intended target and the IRA had tried to kill him the previous month with an under-car bomb.
  - an incendiary bomb exploded in a supermarket in Belfast city centre. A second device exploded the next day. A device in another store was defused.
- 23 December 1991:
  - three IRA firebombs exploded at separate underground railway stations in London. There were no injuries although an estimated 50,000 commuters were affected and the cost was reportedly around $90 million.
  - the IRA called a 72-hour long Christmas truce.
- 27 December 1991:
  - three minutes after midnight, an IRA bomb damaged the Belfast-Dublin rail line close to Newry.
  - twenty-five minutes after midnight, an IRA unit opened fire on British security forces guarding the Belfast Law Courts.
  - a shopper found an incendiary device in the Primark store in Belfast city centre.
  - the IRA's East Tyrone Brigade issued a warning claiming that a bomb had failed to detonate when undercover British soldiers entered an unoccupied house near Coagh, County Tyrone.
- 28 December 1991: the IRA bombed a section of railway track at Newry station, and also claimed to have left devices on a section of the line between Poyntzpass and Newry, causing severe disruption to train services.
- 29 December 1991: a 500 lb (230 kg) car bomb exploded at the British Army permanent vehicle checkpoint at Aughnacloy, County Tyrone.
- 31 December 1991:
  - hoax bomb alerts delayed traffic for hours in Belfast and Lisburn.
  - two British soldiers were injured in separate thrown bomb attacks on patrols in the Oldpark and Falls Road areas of Belfast.
  - a coffee jar bomb was made safe by the British Army outside New Barnsley RUC base, Belfast.
  - two British soldiers and four civilians were injured when coffee jar bombs were thrown at patrols in separate attacks on the Falls Road and Oldpark Road, Belfast.
  - IRA members opened fired on British security forces in the Lenadoon area of West Belfast.
  - IRA members opened fired on British security forces in the Poleglass area of West Belfast.
  - IRA members opened fired on British security forces at Fort Whiterock in West Belfast.
  - IRA members opened fired on British security forces in the New Lodge area of North Belfast.
  - British soldiers opened fire on a gunman in the Andersonstown area of Belfast. The RUC reported firing one round at an armed man on the Norglen Road.
  - a coffee jar bomb was thrown at a joint British Army/RUC patrol in the Markets area of Belfast. There were no serious injuries, although members of the patrol suffered hearing difficulties.
  - incendiary devices were discovered in a gift shop in Belfast.
  - incendiary devices were discovered in a furniture store in Bangor, County Down.

== See also ==
- Timeline of Continuity Irish Republican Army actions
- Timeline of Real Irish Republican Army actions
- Timeline of Irish National Liberation Army actions
- Timeline of Official Irish Republican Army actions
- Timeline of Ulster Volunteer Force actions
- Timeline of Ulster Defence Association actions
- Timeline of the Northern Ireland Troubles
- List of attacks on British aircraft during The Troubles
