= Timeline of Irish National Liberation Army actions =

This is the Timeline of Irish National Liberation Army actions (Irish National Liberation Army actions, INLA), an Irish republican socialist paramilitary group. Most of these actions took place as part of its 1975–1998 campaign during "the Troubles" in Northern Ireland. The INLA did not start claiming responsibility for its actions under the INLA name until January 1976 at which point they had already killed 12 people, before then they used the names People's Liberation Army (PLA) and People's Republican Army (PRA) to claim its attacks.

== 1970s ==
=== 1974 ===
- 8 December: the Irish National Liberation Army (INLA), along with its political wing, the Irish Republican Socialist Party (IRSP), was founded at the Spa Hotel in Lucan, South Dublin.

=== 1975 ===
- 8 February: INLA members opened fire on the Princess Bar on the Ormeau Road, seriously injuring a barmaid. The INLA later claimed the pub, a known Ulster Defence Association (UDA) meeting place, was targeted to pre-empt a UDA attack on a pub in the Markets area of Belfast.
- 14 February: INLA members shot and injured a utility worker in his car in Derry, having mistaken him for a member of British security forces.
- 20 February: the Official Irish Republican Army (OIRA) shot dead an IRSP branch chairman of Whiterock (Hugh Ferguson) in Ballymurphy, Belfast, as part of the feud between the two republican groups.
- 25 February: the INLA shot dead an Official IRA volunteer (Sean Fox) in the Divis Flats area of Belfast; part of the feud.
- 1 March: the INLA shot and critically injured OIRA leader Sean Garland outside his home in the Ballymun area of Dublin; part of the feud.
- 12 March: Republican gunmen shot dead a Protestant civilian (Raymond Carrothers) at his home in the Cliftonville area of Belfast. Lost Lives alleges INLA members killed him in retaliation for the murder of a Catholic man in the area days earlier.
- 13 March: INLA gunmen shot and wounded Republican Clubs official Sean Morrisey in Belfast.
- 6 April: the Official IRA shot dead an INLA volunteer (Daniel Loughran) on Albert Street, Belfast; part of the feud. In retaliation, the "People's Liberation Army" shot three Official IRA members in the leg after taking them from Moyard Social Club.
- 12 April: the INLA shot dead an Official IRA volunteer (Paul Crawford) on Falls Road; part of the feud.
- 28 April: the INLA shot dead Official IRA Belfast Brigade Commander Billy McMillen on Falls Road; part of the feud.
- 24 May: a Royal Ulster Constabulary (RUC) officer (Noel Davis) was killed by an INLA booby trap bomb left in a car in Ballinahone, near Maghera, County Londonderry.
- 5 June: the Official IRA shot dead an INLA volunteer (Brendan McNamee) on Stewartstown Road, Belfast; part of the feud.
- 15 June: INLA/IRSP members fired several shots from a hijacked car at two Protestant men on West Circular Road in the Springfield Road area of Belfast. There were no reported injuries. It was later reported the INLA believed they were Loyalist paramilitaries.
- 17 June: the People's Liberation Army claimed responsibility for a number of bomb hoaxes in Belfast.
- 18 June: the INLA shot and wounded an RUC officer at Hamilton Street, Derry during an ambush on an RUC mobile patrol.
- 21 June: the PLA claimed responsibility for four hoax car bombs left at main roads in Derry. In a statement, the PLA said it "regretted" the action but said it was done to draw attention to the denial of political status to IRSP prisoners.
- July: a British soldier and an RUC officer were held up and disarmed in Dungiven, County Londonderry. Uniforms, documents, and weapons were seized.
- 7 July: the INLA fired several shots at a British Army mobile patrol at the junction of Racecourse Road and Ardnamoyle Park in Derry. The "People's Liberation Army, Derry Command" later stated the attack was a response to increased British Army activity in the city, including checkpoints and searches.
- 7 July: two RUC officers were held up and disarmed in Limavady, County Londonderry. Uniforms, documents, and weapons were seized.
- 26 July: an INLA sniper shot dead a RUC officer (Robert McPherson) shortly after he left his armoured personnel carrier in Dungiven, County Londonderry. Another RUC officer was seriously injured in the attack.
- 9 August: the INLA carried out three attacks against British Army patrols in the Windmill Hill-Callan Street area of Armagh City, Armagh, injuring two soldiers.
- 9 August: an INLA unit carried out an attack against a British Army patrol in the Ballymurphy area of Belfast, seriously injuring a British soldier.
- 9 August: an INLA unit carried out an attack against a British Army patrol in Waterford Street, Lower Falls in Belfast, seriously injuring a British soldier.
- 9–10 August: the INLA was involved in clashes at the Divis Flats complex in Belfast, later claiming to have "assisted in the defence of the Divis Flats Complex against Loyalist and British enemy attacks". The area reportedly came under sustained fire from loyalist gunmen, and there were numerous gun battles between republicans and the British Army across West Belfast. Two Catholic children were killed in the fighting.
- 18 August: The "People's Republican Army" claimed responsibility for a single shot fired at an RUC patrol car in Dungiven. Glass shards injured an RUC officer. Press reports linked the attack to an earlier INLA shooting in Dungiven and the cover-name was associated with (but not exclusively used by) the INLA.
- 22 August: a 20 lb (9.1 kg) no-warning bomb demolished a bar and damaged several surrounding buildings in the village of Blackwatertown, County Armagh. One woman was treated for minor injuries. An INLA member was later charged with involvement.
- 6 September: an INLA unit attacked Rosemount RUC station in Derry. The station came under sustained fire for approximately fifteen minutes.
- 11 September: INLA members fired several shots at the car of a UDR soldier at the Shambles Yard, Armagh. He was not hit but was injured by glass splinters.
- 12 September: two British soldiers, a major and a private, were injured by an INLA bomb in the Whiterock area of Belfast.
- 13 September: the INLA claimed two British soldiers were injured during an attack on a mobile patrol in the Shantallow area of Derry. The RUC claimed no shooting incident occurred.
- 5 October: the People's Liberation Army claimed responsibility for the accidental shooting of a 10-month-old baby during a botched hijacking attempt nearby in the Turf Lodge area of Belfast.
- 10 October: a British Army soldier (Private David Wray) died two weeks after being shot by an INLA sniper while on patrol on Iniscarn Road, Derry.
- 27 October: INLA members shot and wounded two Protestant garage workers on the Strand Road, Derry, alleging they were members of the UDA. Both men had been before the courts on arms charges. It was retaliation for a UDA under-car booby-trap bomb which severely injured a Catholic man three days earlier.
- 30 October: the INLA bombed a garage in Armagh, County Armagh. They accused the business of servicing security forces vehicles.
- 2 November: a British soldier was injured in an INLA ambush in Armagh, County Armagh.
- 2 December: two Protestant civilians (Charles McNaul and Alexander Mitchell) were shot dead while sitting in the Dolphin Café on Strand Road, Derry. Gunmen carrying pistols picked them out and opened fire without warning. The INLA later admitted responsibility and claimed its gunmen believed the two men were members of the UDA.
- 31 December 1975: INLA Volunteers using the covername "People's Republican Army" killed 3 people and injured 30 in a bomb attack on a pub in Gilford, County Down. The Armagh brigade of the People's Liberation Army also claimed responsibility. (See: Central Bar bombing 1975)

=== 1976 ===
- January: the "National Liberation Army" announced its existence in a press release published in the IRSP newspaper The Starry Plough. It also claimed responsibility for several attacks on British security forces carried out in 1975. The INLA had previously announced its formation and claimed responsibility for attacks in November 1975; the statement was released too late to be included in the December issues of The Starry Plough. In February a statement was issued announcing that the INLA and PLA had merged.
- 3 January: twenty-three people were injured, four seriously, when a bomb exploded at the Golden Hind bar in West Street, Portadown, County Armagh.
- 7 February: a Catholic schoolboy (Thomas Rafferty, 14) was killed by an INLA booby-trap bomb meant for the security services at Derryall Road, Portadown, County Armagh, after Rafferty accidentally triggered the bomb.
- 12 March: INLA members exchanged fire with armed Gardaí Special Branch detectives during an attempted train robbery in County Wicklow.
- 5 May: nine IRSP/INLA prisoners escaped from Long Kesh prison via a tunnel.
- 25 May: the INLA shot and seriously wounded a female RUC officer (Hazel McCready) in Lurgan, County Armagh. Her husband, also an RUC officer, escaped injury.
- 31 May: the INLA fired on Democratic Unionist Party (DUP) politician Charlie Poots as he drove through the Markets area of Belfast. He escaped injury.
- 3 August: an INLA unit armed with a shotgun shot dead a British soldier (Alan Watkins) on foot patrol in Main Street, Dungiven, County Londonderry. A follow-up operation discovered a large booby-trap bomb rigged to a cartridge in the derelict building from where the attack was carried out.
- September: in the May 1977 issue of The Starry Plough the INLA claimed responsibility for six attacks against "property and individuals associated with the prison service" between September and December 1976.
- 10 September: a bomb planted by INLA members destroyed a confectioner's shop in Portadown, County Armagh.
- 14 September: INLA and IRA prisoners in Maze Prison began the blanket protest.
- 25 September: the INLA launched a gun attack at a house on Ormonde Park, Finaghy, Belfast. Gunmen opened fire in the hallway, killing a father (James Kyle) and his daughter (Rosaleen Kyle), both Protestant civilians. A detective said that it was thought to be a case of mistaken identity. In the Belfast Street Directory, James Kyle was described as a "chief inspector" and it was assumed the gunmen thought he was an RUC officer, but, in fact, Kyle had been a bank inspector until two months before his death, on 28 October 1976.
- 25 November: the INLA shot dead a British soldier (Andrew Crocker) when he arrived at the scene of an armed robbery at a post office in the Turf Lodge area of Belfast.
- 2 December: several INLA members were arrested following the attempted killing of an RUC officer in a patrol near Dungiven, County Londonderry in the preceding days.
- 22 December: the INLA killed a RUC officer (Samuel Armour) with a booby-trap bomb attached to his car outside his home, Curragh Road, Maghera, County Londonderry.
- 29 December: a civilian security guard (James Liggett) died two weeks after being shot trying to stop a bomb attack on the Tavern Bar, Edenderry, Portadown, County Armagh. The attack was later described in court as a joint IRA-INLA operation. The People's Liberation Army claimed responsibility.

=== 1977 ===
- 23 January: an INLA sniper shot dead a British soldier (George Muncaster) while on foot patrol, Eliza Street, Markets, Belfast.
- 1 March: the INLA shot a magistrate (Robert Whitten) on Thomas Street, Portadown, County Armagh. He died of his wounds on 19 June 1977.
- 7 April: an INLA unit was ambushed by undercover British soldiers near Bellaghy, County Londonderry. An INLA member was seriously wounded but suppressed the soldiers long enough to allow the rest of his unit to escape.
- 28 April: two RUC detectives were wounded after cornering an INLA unit who had just kidnapped the son of a Belfast banker on the outskirts of Belfast. The INLA members escaped and were later paid a ransom of £25,000.
- 26 May: a British soldier, member of a liaison team from the Royal Anglian Regiment, was shot and seriously injured by an INLA member in a corridor in the Royal Victoria Hospital, Belfast. One of the five shots fired also hit a male nurse.
- 7 September: the INLA's South Derry Brigade attempted to kidnap the West German honorary consul Jürgen Gradel from his home in Ballymena; after forcing Gradel to his knees and firing a single shot, the lone gunman fled, seemingly startled by his wife upstairs. His predecessor Thomas Niedermayer had been abducted and murdered by the Provisional IRA in 1973.
- 5 October: INLA founder and leader Seamus Costello was shot dead by the Official IRA in Northbrook Avenue, Dublin; part of the feud with the Official IRA.
- 25 November: the INLA claimed responsibility for a bomb at the home of a prison officer in Finaghy, Belfast.
- 11 December: the INLA carried out several attacks in Belfast using newly acquired Soviet model hand grenades; the first grenade was thrown at British soldiers in sangar at Roden Street, two hours later soldiers came under attack on the Antrim Road, then a third grenade was lobbed at a passing patrol at the junction of Cullingtree Road and Albert Street.
- 12 December: British Army soldiers shot dead an INLA volunteer (Colm McNutt) in Derry after he allegedly attempted to hijack a car containing undercover soldier.
- 14 December: the INLA claimed responsibility for a grenade attack on Rosemount RUC station, Derry. Damage was minimal and there were no reported injuries.
- 15 December: the INLA carried out another grenade attack on Rosemount RUC station, Derry. Damage was minimal and there were no reported injuries.
- 16 December: the INLA carried out a grenade attack on Strand Road British Army base, Derry.
- 17 December: the INLA reported firing shots at a British security forces patrol vehicle "speeding through" the Creggan estate in Derry.

=== 1978 ===
- 26 February: following an IRSP H-Block rally, an INLA unit ambushed a Saracen APC after slowing it down with a makeshift barricade on the Springfield Road, Belfast. A British soldier was wounded.
- 26 February: a hand grenade was thrown at a RUC station on the Springfield Road, Belfast.
- 26 February: an INLA member armed only with a handgun fired into an armoured car at point blank range in west Belfast.
- 8 March: the Ulster Volunteer Force (UVF) shot dead an INLA volunteer (Thomas Trainor), together with a civilian (Denis Kelly) as they both left a Department of Health and Social Services office, Armagh Road, Portadown, County Armagh.
- 16 March: the INLA shot and injured a prominent member of the Orange Order and brother of the former commander of the UDA Mid-Ulster Brigade in Portadown, County Armagh.
- 25 March: a gun and grenade attack was carried out on the Loyalist Queen's Bar in Thomas Street, Portadown, County Armagh, in retaliation for the murder of Thomas Trainor. Trainor's brother was later arrested and charged with the shooting.
- 28 March: an INLA bomb team was intercepted by the RUC in Finaghy Road North, Belfast. Officers shot and seriously wounded one of the men, who was a key member of the organisation in Belfast.
- 30 April: the INLA fired seven shots at a British soldier on the roof of Springfield Road RUC station, west Belfast, striking his helmet but ricocheting off. A grenade was also thrown over the perimeter wall of the base.
- 10 May: following the death of Catholic man Brian Maguire in RUC custody, the INLA claimed responsibility for several attacks on British security forces:
  - the INLA opened fire on RUC officers at Henry Taggart barracks in West Belfast.
  - the INLA attacked a UDR patrol in the Ormeau Road area of Belfast.
  - An INLA unit carried out a gun & grenade attack on the British Army barracks on Springfield Road, Belfast.
- 28 May: the INLA was responsible for several bomb hoaxes in Derry. Hijacked buses were also left on Craigavon Bridge and the Strand Road. The disruption was timed to coincide with the opening of a festival organised by the city council.
- 20 July: the INLA kneecapped a 17-year-old youth in Shankill, Dublin, claiming he had been in contact with Garda Special Branch detectives. The group stated they would have executed him but for his age. The victim, Kevin Coyle, was shot dead by the Provisional IRA in Derry in 1985, who claimed he was an RUC informer.
- 8 August: the INLA claimed responsibility for six separate shooting attacks on British security forces in Belfast, including at Fort Pegasus, Henry Taggart barracks and Fort Monagh.
- 13 August: the INLA wounded a British soldier in Roden Street in the Markets area of Belfast, according to authors Holland and McDonald.
- 14 August: the INLA opened fire on a British security forces observation post in the Markets area of Belfast, according to authors Holland and McDonald.
- 16 August: the INLA wounded three British soldiers in Cromac Square in the Markets area of Belfast, according to authors Holland and McDonald.
- 26 August: the INLA claimed responsibility for seriously injuring a man in an apparent punishment shooting attack in the Whiterock area of Belfast.
- 8 October: the INLA shot and injured an RUC detective in his car at the Balmoral flyover, near King's Hall, Belfast.
- 12 November: British Ambassador to Ireland Walter Robert Haydon unknowingly survived an INLA assassination attempt in St Patrick's Cathedral, Dublin. A remote-controlled bomb placed inside a stool failed to explode when triggered from a car outside and was later retrieved by members of the INLA.
- 5 December: the INLA fired a dozen shots at British soldiers in the vicinity of Fort Monagh, West Belfast. One soldier was hit in the leg.
- 11 December: the INLA claimed responsibility for several bombs planted outside premises in Belfast city centre; a bank on the Antrim Road, an insurance company office on Clarence Street, an electrical goods showroom on the Antrim Road and Water Department headquarters in Verner Street. A fifth device was defused outside a bank in Bedford Street.
- 15 December: the INLA planted bombs outside two bank premises at Sackville Street and Shipquay Street, Derry. One device was defused, the other caused only minor damage. Bomb attacks on two banks in the Shantallow area of the city were aborted because the unit involved was delayed.
- 15 December: the INLA injured a British soldier in a hand grenade attack at Castle Gate, Waterloo Street, Derry.
- 17 December: a Maze prison officer was injured when a mercury-tilt switch bomb exploded under his car near Lisburn. (This was the first time the INLA used this type of device)

=== 1979 ===
- 4 January: the INLA fired several shots at an RUC patrol vehicle as it travelled along Glen Road in West Belfast.
- 6 January: INLA members in a hijacked car exchanged fire with pursuing RUC officers in the Creggan area of Derry. The driver of the hijacked vehicle was injured and arrested.
- 23 January: INLA gunmen, firing from an occupied house, shot and seriously injured an RUC traffic constable near the Kennedy Way/M1 motorway intersection in Belfast.
- 28 January: an English-born civilian (Arthur Lockett) was found dead outside Dublin following anonymous phone calls claiming he was a member of the SAS. Gardaí initially believed he was killed by the IRA as a suspected British agent after boasting he had ties to the British Army, but an INLA member was later jailed for 12 years.
- 16 February: the INLA fired shots at British soldiers on the Falls Road, Belfast.
- 17 February: the INLA fired nearly fifty shots at a joint RUC-British Army mobile patrol in an ambush on the Andersonstown Road, Belfast. The leading RUC Land-Rover received fourteen rounds, bursting two tyres and nearly causing the driver to lose control. Seven shots hit a parked civilian car but the occupants were uninjured.
- 6 March: an INLA booby-trap bomb exploded underneath the car of a UDR soldier (Robert McNally) as he was leaving a car park, West Street, Portadown, County Armagh. McNally died on 13 March.
- 9 March: the INLA carried out several firebomb attacks on banks in Belfast.
- 10 March: INLA snipers opened fire on a British Army and RUC patrol in Belfast, no hits were claimed.
- 22 March: an INLA sniper opened fire on an RUC mobile patrol in Cromac Street adjacent to the Markets area of Belfast, injuring one RUC officer hitting him in the arm and his thigh.
- 30 March: Airey Neave, British Conservative Party Member of Parliament and adviser to Margaret Thatcher, was killed by a booby-trap bomb underneath his car at the House of Commons; the INLA claimed responsibility. The INLA issued a statement regarding the killing in the August 1979 edition of The Starry Plough:
- 9 April: an INLA commander claimed responsibility for a series of bomb attacks in Northern Ireland a fortnight previously, in an interview with a Dublin-based newspaper.
- 11 April: an INLA unit opened fire on an RUC mobile patrol at the corner of Spinner Street and Lower Falls, Belfast, injuring an RUC officer.
- 13 April: an INLA unit opened fire on a British Army foot patrol in the Whiterock area of Belfast.
- 19 April: the INLA shot dead a prison officer (Agnes Wallace) during a gun and grenade attack outside Armagh Prison, four other officers were injured in the attack.
- 30 April: a UDR soldier narrowly escaped serious injury after a booby-trap bomb exploded under his car at the junction of Linenhall Street and Bridge Street, Ballymena, County Antrim.
- 7 May: the INLA attempted to lure RUC officers into a hut with a booby-trap bomb at a building site in the Galliagh area of Derry.
- 12 May: an INLA unit in a car opened fire with a sub-machinegun in the centre of Belfast, hitting an RUC officer in the leg. Two other officers were treated for shock.
- 2 June: an off-duty RUC officer (Alan Dunne) and a former UDR soldier (David Stinson) were shot dead outside Officer Dunne's home in Baillinahoe Crescent, Armagh. The INLA claimed responsibility.
- 18 June: an INLA unit fired on an RUC vehicle patrol as it passed at the junction of Cullingtree Road and Albert Street in the Divis Flats area, Belfast.
- 3 July: the INLA was declared an illegal organisation in Britain and Northern Ireland.
- 6 July: the INLA claimed responsibility for a recent sniper attack on a British Army vehicle patrol in the Bogside area of Derry. They also claimed responsibility for an attack on the British Army in Bishop Street some weeks previously.
- 12 July: an INLA unit opened fire from the Divis Flats on RUC officers in the vicinity of Hastings Street RUC station, Belfast.
- 27 July: a former RUC reservist (James Wright) was killed by a booby trap bomb attached to his car by the INLA outside his home, Corcrain Drive, Portadown, County Armagh. His 21-year-old daughter was also seriously injured in the attack.
- 31 July: the INLA shot dead a RUC officer (George Walsh) from a passing car while Walsh sat in a stationary car, outside Armagh Courthouse, Armagh town.
- 8 August: the INLA carried out four sniping attacks on British security forces in Belfast.
- 9 August: the INLA carried out numerous gun attacks on the British Army and RUC in West Belfast during unrest marking the ten-year anniversary of the deployment of British troops to Northern Ireland and eight-year anniversary of internment.
- 2 September: the INLA shot a 20-year-old woman in the arms and legs in an apparent punishment shooting at Norfolk Road in the Springfield area of Belfast.
- 29 September: two INLA members hijacked a motorcycle on the Falls Road, Belfast for a gun attack on British soldiers in Belfast city centre. They were spotted by the RUC on Durham Street and after a chase arrested.
- 16 October: an INLA volunteer (Anthony McClelland) died after the car he was travelling in crashed while being chased by armed Gardaí in County Monaghan. Dessie O'Hare, the driver, was arrested having sustained several injuries. Two other passengers were also injured. The group were transporting arms and ammunition when they encountered a Garda checkpoint.
- 20 October: two INLA gunmen shot and wounded a man in Belfast City Hospital in the early hours of the morning. He was in hospital following a gun attack at his home in the Markets area of Belfast the evening prior.
- 3 November: the INLA bombed the British Consulate in Antwerp, Belgium.
- 7 November: the INLA shot dead a Northern Ireland Prison Service employee (David Teeney) at a bus stop shortly after leaving Crumlin Road Prison, Belfast.

== 1980s ==
=== 1980 ===
- 13 January: a civilian (John Brown) died seven months after being shot by INLA members during an armed robbery at the post office where he worked on Main Street, Blackwatertown, County Armagh.
- 8 February: a Jewish businessman (Leonard Kaitcher) was abducted from his Belfast home. The kidnappers demanded a ransom worth £1m be brought to Newry but didn't make contact and instead shot Kaitcher. The RUC believed republicans were responsible, and the gun involved was forensically linked to the IRA and INLA. The INLA denied responsibility but republican sources later blamed members of the group.
- 7 March: an INLA Active service unit planted two 10 lb bombs at Netheravon British Army camp in the Salisbury Plain Training Area. Only one bomb detonated and caused damage starting a fire, injuring two soldiers.
- 8 March: a part-time UDR soldier was seriously injured by a booby-trap bomb planted under his car, outside his workplace on the Springfield Road, Belfast. The INLA claimed responsibility.
- 10 March: INLA members destroyed a nightclub in an incendiary bomb attack in Foyle Street, Derry.
- 17 March: the INLA claimed responsibility for the shooting of a UDR soldier at his workplace at Gransha Hospital, Derry. The IRA also claimed responsibility.
- 18 March: INLA members carried out a firebomb attack on a pub in Derry. The fire was contained but several hours later another fire started. Secretly, the Derry INLA had agreed to wreck the restaurant in return for a cut of the insurance pay-out afterwards. The INLA reported carrying out a shooting attack on the British Army in the city on the same day, and three other similar attacks in Derry in March 1980.
- April: the INLA reported recently carrying out shooting attacks on British security forces in the Markets area of Belfast, in the April issue of The Starry Plough.
- 3 April: an RUC officer was "very seriously" injured by a mercury tilt-switch bomb planted under his car in the Mountpottinger area of Belfast.
- 9 May: the INLA claimed responsibility for a bomb attack which destroyed a customs post at Carnagh, County Armagh.
- 27 June: the INLA claimed responsibility for shooting and seriously wounding two UDR soldiers (one serving, one a former member) at a garage in Aughnacloy, County Tyrone. A third man at the scene returned fire with a legally-held weapon but claimed no hits.
- 30 June: the INLA claimed responsibility for firebombing the Greystone Rugby Club near Dublin. A club player, John Robbie, was on tour with the Lions in Apartheid South Africa.
- 8 July: an INLA bomb exploded under a car parked opposite Lisburn Road RUC station, Belfast, as a British Army expert tried to defuse it. The owner had no connections to British security forces.
- 14 July: the INLA shot and injured two RUC officers from a passing car on the Newtownards Road in East Belfast.
- 19 July: the INLA claimed responsibility for an arson attack on a hardware store near Newtownhamilton, County Armagh. They alleged it was being used as a secret observation post by the British Army.
- 9 August: an INLA sniper accidentally shot dead a civilian (James McCarren) during a sniper attack on a British Army mobile patrol, Shaw's Road, Andersonstown, Belfast.
- 9 August: the INLA reported firing several shots at the RUC in the Markets area of Belfast following unrest. They claimed to have injured an RUC officer.
- 21 August: the INLA claimed responsibility for an attempted arson attack on a customs post at Carnagh, County Armagh.
- 29 August: a civilian (Frank McGrory) died after inadvertently detonating a booby trap bomb which had been hidden in a hedgerow, at Carnagh, County Armagh, near Keady; it is believed to have been left there by the INLA for use against the security forces.
- 2 September: the INLA released an English tourist they kidnapped near Castleblaney, County Monaghan who they had mistaken for a member of the SAS.
- 21 September: the INLA threatened to bomb hotels in the Republic where RUC officers and Gardaí met to discuss security issues.
- 21 September: the INLA threatened to shoot motorists who failed to stop at an INLA checkpoint, following the blocking of a main Armagh-Monaghan road with a hijacked car. The area was sealed for several hours as British Army bomb experts inspected the vehicle.
- 15 October: the UDA shot dead INLA leader Ronnie Bunting and another INLA member (Noel Little) at Bunting's home in Downfine Gardens, Belfast. Bunting's wife, Suzanne, was wounded in the attack.
- 19 November: the INLA shot dead a civilian (Thomas Orr) outside his workplace, Ulster Bank on Boucher Road, Belfast. It emerged that the shooting was a case of mistaken identity. The intended target had been an RUC Reserve officer who worked at the bank. The officer had sold a car to the victim two weeks earlier. He had taken the precaution of changing the vehicle's registration number but the gunmen had identified the car by its make and colour.
- 5 December: the INLA claimed a hijacked car with wires leading from it, abandoned a week previously at Tullynawood, Keady, County Armagh, contained a bomb. The British Army sealed the area.
- 10 December: the INLA shot dead an off-duty UDR soldier (Colin Quinn) after leaving his workplace, Fox Row, off Durham Street, Belfast.
- 21 December: a booby-trapped toy soldier was found near Keady, County Armagh. Sources claim the INLA was responsible.
- 28 December: the INLA shot dead an off-duty British Territorial Army soldier (Hugh McGinn) outside his home, Umgola Villas, Umgola, near Armagh town.

=== 1981 ===
==== January–June ====
- 3 January: the INLA tried to assassinate unionist politician David Calvert at his home in Lurgan, County Armagh. A gunman reportedly armed with a silenced pistol appeared at his front door 20 minutes after a phone call claiming to be from a constituent.
- 8 January: the INLA fired shots at RUC officers on patrol on Great Victoria Street, Belfast; one officer (Lindsay McDougall) was wounded and died six days later, on 14 January.
- 18 January: the INLA claimed responsibility for a small arms attack on a British Army checkpoint between Keady, County Armagh, and Castleblayney, County Monaghan. There were no reported injuries and the soldiers did not return fire.
- 19 January: INLA members kidnapped a woman from a social event in Arklow, County Wexford to raise funds for the INLA. She was rescued after three days. Seven people were arrested by Gardaí.
- 21 January: the INLA shot and seriously injured a worker at a brewery on the Glen Road in West Belfast, wrongly believing he was a member of the UDR.
- 25 January: the INLA claimed responsibility for two bombs which extensively damaged a dairy factory at Altnmackuin near Newtownhamilton, County Armagh.
- 8 February: the INLA shot dead an RUC officer (Alexander Scott) on My Lady's Road, Belfast.
- 1 March: a republican hunger strike began in the Maze Prison. Four INLA and nineteen IRA prisoners would join.
- 25 March: the INLA shot and seriously wounded Belfast city councillor Sammy Millar in his Shankill Road home. He was a member of the Ulster Democratic Party, the UDA's political wing. The attack left him permanently disabled.
- 26 March: the INLA shot a man in the leg the Markets area of Belfast "for jeopardising an active service unit".
- 27 March: the INLA shot dead an off-duty UDR soldier (John Smith) on Cromac Street in the Markets area of Belfast.
- 2 April: the INLA planted a mercury tilt-switch bomb under the car of Kenneth Shimeld, Permanent Secretary of the Northern Ireland Office, in Deramore Drive, off the Malone Road, Belfast. The bomb fell off the vehicle and was defused by the British Army.
- 16 April: the INLA shot dead an off-duty UDR soldier (John Donnelly) who was drinking at The Village Inn, Moy, County Tyrone.
- 19 April: a four-man INLA unit opened fire on a British Army patrol from the across the border near Keady, County Armagh.
- 21 April: INLA members shot a bus driver in the head after he tried to drive off during a hijacking in Craigavon, County Armagh.
- 21 April: the INLA claimed responsibility for a gun attack on an RUC armoured vehicle in the Markets area of Belfast. RUC officers returned fire.
- 27 April: the INLA killed an RUC officer (Gary Martin) and injured three other officers, two of them seriously, with a booby-trap bomb hidden in a lorry at the junction of Shaw's Road and Glen Road, Andersonstown, Belfast.
- 27 April: INLA gunmen assaulted an English businessman and stole his wallet in a pub in Castleblayney, County Monaghan. The INLA later claimed they were checking his identification and warned that British visitors were not welcome because of the ongoing Hunger Strike.
- 4 May: the INLA launched a gun attack on RUC officers at East Bridge Street, adjacent to the Markets area of Belfast.
- 5 May: the INLA carried out several attacks against the RUC and British Army across Northern Ireland following the death of IRA hunger striker Bobby Sands. An INLA sniper opened fire on British security forces in the Divis Flats area of Belfast.
- 6 May: the INLA claimed that a pair of Catholic priests had attempted to disarm an INLA volunteer on "active service" in Derry, following the shooting of an RUC officer. The named priest denied the INLA allegation, stating it was a "total fabrication".
- 7 May: an INLA volunteer (James Power) was killed in a premature bomb explosion at a house on Friendly Street, Markets, Belfast. The device was intended to be used against a British Army patrol and was being defused after the opportunity passed.
- 12 May: the INLA carried out several attacks against British security forces in Belfast following the death of IRA hunger striker Francis Hughes.
- 12 May: a British Army sniper shot dead an INLA volunteer (Emmanuel McClarnon) after he had opened fire on British soldiers at Divis Flats, Belfast.
- 21 May: INLA prisoner Patsy O'Hara died on hunger strike in the Maze Prison. The INLA reported that following his death they intensified their armed campaign, carrying out daily attacks on the British Army and RUC in the months that followed.
- 21 May: the INLA fired several shots at RUC officers at Springfield Road RUC station, Belfast.
- 22 May: INLA members were confronted by Gardaí at a car parked near the border in County Donegal; they fled leaving firearms and a large quantity of explosives behind. One man was later arrested by the RUC in Derry.
- 25 May: the INLA opened fire on the British Army during rioting in Derry following the funeral of INLA hunger striker Patsy O'Hara. The Starry Plough magazine claimed over two-hundred-and-fifty petrol bombs and forty blast bombs were thrown at British security forces overnight.
- 29 May: the INLA claimed responsibility for an unexploded bomb found at Fianna Fáil headquarters in Castleblayney, County Monaghan, not long before Taoiseach Charles Haughey was due to arrive. The bomb was unprimed and was a warning over Haughey's alleged inactivity on the Hunger Strike issue.
- 1 June: an INLA sniper in the Short Strand area fired on an RUC patrol investigating a bomb alert at Belfast Central railway station. One RUC officer was hit in the back and arm.
- 3 June: an INLA unit fired at an RUC officer from a passing car at Donegal Square South in Belfast city centre, but missed.
- 12 June: a hoax van bomb left outside the High Court in Chichester Street, Belfast, caused widespread disruption. The British Army declared the device a hoax after firing several shots at the van.
- 17 June: a bomb was found hidden in a field near the Armagh border in County Monaghan. Two men with suspected INLA links were arrested by Gardaí, who believed the device had been planted as a trap for British security forces across the border before being moved.
- 26 June: INLA members were spotted by a passer-by planting a bomb under the car of an RUC officer outside an RUC station in east Belfast. The device was later defused.
- 27 June: an INLA member fired several shots at a British soldier on duty in the intensive care ward of Royal Victoria Hospital, Belfast, before escaping in an awaiting hijacked car.

==== July–December ====
- 3 July: an INLA member fired on Rev. Ian Paisley's car after it crossed Albert Bridge, near the Markets area of Belfast. In a statement issued less than two hours after the shooting the INLA said:
  ...His incitement to hatred against the Nationalist population makes him a legitimate target and his security can be easily breached at any time...
- 8 July: an INLA unit opened fire on a British security forces patrol in the Markets area of Belfast and an exchange of fire ensued for several minutes.
- 10 July: the INLA reported that a unit "engaged the RUC in a gun battle" in the Ballycolman area of Strabane, County Tyrone, but had to disengage because of civilians in the vicinity.
- 10 July: the INLA reported that a unit detonated a bomb as an RUC armoured vehicle passed in the Short Strand area of Belfast.
- 10 July: an INLA supporter (Hugh O'Neill) was killed by an accidental firearm discharge in the Ballymurphy area of Belfast.
- 13 July: the INLA reported that they opened fire on British soldiers in the Turf Lodge area of West Belfast on seven occasions following the death of IRA hunger striker Martin Hurson. The INLA regularly carried out attacks in Turf Lodge in this period.
- 13 July: armed INLA members set fire to a border post near Carna, County Armagh and then hijacked a passing car. They were later arrested in Castleblayney, County Monaghan.
- 14 July: an INLA unit shot and wounded a British Royal Marine in an ambush on a patrol in the Lower Falls area of Belfast.
- 14 July: an INLA unit wounded an RUC officer in a close-range gun attack on the Ormeau Road, Belfast.
- 14 July: the INLA reported carrying out five attacks on British security forces in the Turf Lodge area of West Belfast, including an incident in which a sniper shot a British Royal Marine in Fort Jericho.
- 18 July: the INLA attacked an RUC vehicle patrol with two blast bombs in the Markets area of Belfast, slightly injuring an RUC officer.
- 19 July: an INLA sniper fired two shots at an RUC patrol at Lisbon Street in the Short Strand area of Belfast. The officers returned fire but claimed no hits and were later treated for shock.
- 21 July: an INLA unit shot and seriously injured an RUC Reserve officer on duty at the High Court in Belfast. A single 5.56mm rifle round was fired from a hijacked van with a hole cut in it.
- 23 July: two INLA incendiary bombs were defused by the British Army in a restaurant in Waterloo Street, Derry. The INLA claimed there were three.
- 24 July: the INLA burnt out a restaurant in Waterloo Street, Derry, following an earlier failed bombing attempt. The INLA claimed the premises was exploited by the British Army and RUC.
- 24 July: an INLA booby-trap van bomb exploded at a brewery on the Glen Road, west Belfast. Three men were injured, one very seriously.
- 25 July: the INLA reported that a unit fired several shots at an RUC mobile patrol in the Ballycolman area of Strabane, County Tyrone.
- 27 July: INLA snipers "very seriously" injured an RUC officer across a peace line in the Shankill area of Belfast from a block of flats in Bombay Street. A 13-year-old girl was also injured. A gas meter had been broken into to lure the RUC to Sugarfield Street.
- 29 July: the INLA planned to detonate a bomb on the route of the wedding of Charles, Prince of Wales and Lady Diana Spencer but the operation was aborted after the Belfast INLA could not get explosives in time.
- 30 July: the Derry Brigade of the INLA claimed responsibility for six recent gun attacks on British Army and RUC patrols in the Bogside, Shantallow and Waterside areas. The INLA claimed on one occasion fire was returned.
- 31 July: the INLA claimed responsibility for shooting dead a UDR soldier and ex-RUC officer (Thomas Harpur) who was visiting a friend's home, Mount Sion, Ballycolman, Strabane, County Tyrone. It was later stated in court that the IRA carried out the killing, although Harpur had been under INLA surveillance.
- 1 August: INLA prisoner Kevin Lynch died on hunger strike in the Maze Prison.
- 1 August: an INLA unit opened fire on an RUC patrol in the Clonard Gardens area of West Belfast.
- 10 August: an INLA sniper wounded a UDR soldier in the Short Strand area of east Belfast. Afterwards the regular British Army and UDR sealed the Catholic enclave and mounted an intensive two-day search of the area.
- 12 August: the INLA planted a magnetic booby-trap bomb under an RUC officer's car outside the Magistrate's Court in Chichester Street in Belfast. The device was discovered and defused by the British Army.
- 14 August: the Derry Brigade of the INLA claimed responsibility for three gun attacks on the British Army and RUC in the Shantallow-Carnhill area during the week, alleging in one action two RUC vehicles were hit and an RUC officer injured. The INLA also reported two shootings in the Waterside area but no hits were claimed.
- 20 August: INLA prisoner Michael Devine died on hunger strike in the Maze Prison.
- 20 August: the INLA forced a civilian to drive a van bomb to North Howard Street British Army base, Falls Road, Belfast. The resulting explosion reportedly caused only "superficial" damage.
- 22 August: the INLA attacked RUC officers on Mountpottinger Road in the Short Strand area of Belfast.
- 5 September: the INLA opened fire on an RUC patrol investigating a robbery in East Bridge Street, adjacent to the Markets area of Belfast.
- 10 September: an INLA ambush on British security forces at the junction of Rosnareen Park and Shaw's Road, Belfast, was aborted after a vehicle patrol failed to appear.
- 29 September: the INLA shot dead an off-duty UDR soldier (Mark Stockman) shortly after he left his workplace, Mackie's factory, Springfield Road, Belfast. Another UDR soldier was injured. Undercover RUC officers waiting in ambush chased the attackers and fire was exchanged, but the INLA unit escaped.
- 7 October: INLA gunmen fired at RUC officers on the Andersonstown Road, Belfast after luring them to the area by carrying out an armed robbery at a post office. The RUC returned fire but did not claim to have hit anyone.
- 16 October: the INLA shot dead a senior UDA member (Billy McCullough) outside his home on Denmark Street in the Shankill area of Belfast.
- 28 October: a civilian (Edward Brogan) whom the INLA later claimed was an informer, was found shot dead at a rubbish dump, Shantallow, Derry.
- 10 November: the INLA fired shots at an RUC patrol in the Short Strand area of Belfast.
- 14 November: an INLA sniper shot and wounded two RUC officers in the Unity Flats area of West Belfast.
- 24 November: the INLA claimed responsibility for a bomb planted outside the British Consulate in Hamburg, West Germany. The device failed to explode.
- 25 November: the INLA claimed responsibility for exploding a bomb at a British Army base in Herford, West Germany; one British soldier was injured. The attack was carried out in collaboration with the Revolutionary Cells militant organisation.
- 28 November: an INLA attempt to kill an off-duty RUC officer at Queen's University leisure centre, south Belfast, was aborted after the unit involved failed to find their intended target.
- 5 December: A senior INLA member, Harry Flynn, was shot and seriously wounded in a pub in Sackville Street, Dublin, in an assassination attempt. A bystander was hit in the leg. Internal dispute.
- 16 December: a civilian was forced to drive a van bomb to New Barnsley joint British Army-RUC base in West Belfast. There were no reported injuries in the subsequent explosion.

=== 1982 ===
==== January–May ====
- 15 January: an INLA unit used a man they had kneecapped to lure British security forces into a shopping centre in the Shantallow area of Derry and minutes later triggered a 5 lb (2.3 kg) bomb by command wire. However the main charge did not explode.
- 19 January: an INLA member accidentally shot and killed his girlfriend (Deborah Rowe) while cleaning a handgun in the Rosemount area of Derry.
- 22 January: the INLA planted a booby-trap bomb under an RUC officer's car parked on Dunluce Avenue, Belfast. However the officer spotted the device and it was defused.
- 25 January: INLA members Sean Flynn and Bernard Dorrian were shot and injured in the Short Strand area of Belfast. Internal dispute.
- 27 January: the INLA shot and seriously injured a former UDR soldier at his workplace on Alfred Street in Belfast city centre.
- 29 January: the INLA shot dead prominent loyalist and Red Hand Commando founder John McKeague at his shop on Albertbridge Road, Belfast.
- 4 February: the INLA tried to kill an off-duty UDR soldier in the Ogle Street area of Armagh, County Armagh. He was shot at by two gunmen on a motorcycle but returned fire, wounding the driver.
- 11 February: three INLA members transporting a bomb were intercepted by the RUC and arrested in Craigavon, County Armagh.
- 20 February: an INLA member shot dead a member of the Garda Síochána (Patrick Reynolds) at a house in Avonbeg Gardens, Tallaght, County Dublin. In a statement, the INLA claimed the shooting was carried out by "rejects" from the organisation who were also responsible for shooting Harry Flynn in December 1981, and carrying out a recent bank robbery in Askeaton, County Limerick.
- 28 February: an armed INLA member appeared at a march in Belfast commemorating the previous year's H-Block hunger strikers and warned that anyone using the INLA name without authorisation would be killed.
- 14 March: the INLA stole 1,000 lb (450 kg) of Frangex commercial explosives from the Mogul Mines at Silvermines in County Tipperary.
- 4 April: two incendiary bombs were defused by the British Army on Shipquay Street and Strand Road in Derry. The INLA claimed responsibility for that action and three other bomb attacks in the city at a hunger strike commemoration on 12 April.
- 9 April: three banks in Shipquay Street in Derry were damaged by windowsill bombs.
- 21 April: an elderly man was seriously injured by a blast bomb outside a shop on Carlisle Street, Derry. The bomb had been intended for British security forces; the INLA tried to lure them in with a call to the police warning of two other bombs on the same street.
- 22 April: INLA members attempted to hijack a car on Shaw's Road in West Belfast for an attack on British security forces; when the owner refused he was assaulted. The INLA later claimed they were defending themselves and an operation was aborted because of a "strong British Army presence in the area."
- 23 April: a nail bomb planted at a derelict bar exploded as an RUC vehicle patrol passed in the Short Strand area of Belfast. They narrowly escaped injury, the INLA was blamed.
- 29 April: a blast bomb exploded outside a shop near the Ferryquay Gate on Carlisle Street, Derry. RUC officers lured to the scene suffered shock but were left uninjured; the incident was a repeat of a similar attack a week earlier.
- 6 May: an INLA bomb attached to a security barrier seriously injured a British soldier in Durham Street at the edge of Belfast city centre. A civilian passer-by was also injured.
- 7 May: a blast bomb exploded on Spencer Road, Derry. A fireman and a civilian were slightly injured. RUC officers were lured to the ambush site by a hoax bomb in a nearby shop. It was the third such attack in as many weeks.
- 12 May: the INLA hijacked a van and forced the driver to take a bomb to Springfield Road RUC/British Army base, however the British Army intercepted the vehicle and destroyed it in a controlled explosion.
- 16 May: a bomb fell off an RUC officer's car and later exploded, damaging his home at Westland Road, Magherafelt, County Londonderry. His fiancé, also an RUC officer, was treated for shock. The following day another bomb was found and defused under a UDR soldier's car nearby.
- 16 May: the INLA claimed responsibility for detonating a large bomb at the home of former RUC Assistant Chief Constable Sam Bradley in the Ravenhill area of east Belfast. His wife suffered "severe lacerations" from flying glass.
- 20 May: the INLA left a bomb at the home of DUP politician Rev. William Beattie, later labelling him "the arch bigot". The bomb, consisting of ten sticks of commercial explosive attached to a can of petrol and a timing device, was defused.
- 21 May: an INLA bomb hidden in a crate of petrol bombs in a rubbish chute in Unity Flats, Belfast, was neutralised by the British Army following several warnings from the group.
- 27 May: a small bomb detonated under a car in Rosetta Drive, South Belfast. Residents spotted a larger shrapnel bomb rigged to the front door of a former senior RUC detective, who was not home. The device was later defused. The INLA claimed responsibility.
- 2 June: a civilian (Patrick Smith, aged 16) was killed after inadvertently triggering an INLA booby-trap bomb attached to an abandoned motorcycle, Rugby Road, Belfast.

==== June–December ====
- 4 June: the INLA shot dead an Official IRA volunteer (James Flynn) on North Strand Road, Dublin in revenge for the murder of IRSP/INLA founder Seamus Costello in October 1977; Flynn was believed to be responsible. Another Official IRA man survived after the weapon misfired.
- 10 June: Gardaí exchanged shots with suspected members of the INLA during a bank raid in Tipperary town. In the aftermath several suspects were arrested in Killaloe, County Clare, including a prominent member of the IRSP.
- 10 June: an armed INLA member transporting bombs in a vehicle in Derry was arrested by the British Army following a pursuit involving a helicopter.
- 11 June: a former UDR soldier escaped a pair of INLA members who ambushed him at a rear entry off Hayward Avenue on the Ormeau Road, Belfast. The INLA claimed to have hit him several times, but the media reported no injuries.
- 16 June: six people were injured after the INLA exploded a bomb in a commercial premises on Carlisle Road, Derry. A warning had claimed there were three devices and the area was being evacuated when the explosion occurred.
- 22 June: the INLA claimed responsibility for two 3 lb (1.4 kg) bombs planted at a petroleum plant in Derry to coincide with a visit by the Duchess of Gloucester to the city. One exploded causing little damage; but minutes later a second device exploded rupturing a 250,000 gallon (1,136500 litre) storage tank. The massive quantity of fuel spilling from the tank failed to ignite, averting widespread devastation. More than three hundred families were evacuated as the British Army examined a suspected third bomb.
- 25 June: an INLA unit fired several shots at an RUC patrol in Clifton Street at Henry Place, Belfast. There were no reported injuries.
- 1 July: the INLA kidnapped an alleged RUC informer outside a pub in Dundalk, County Louth. He was released a few days later, apparently unharmed.
- 11 July: a petrol blast bomb with a payload of nails partially detonated at the home of West Belfast MP Gerry Fitt. The former SDLP leader narrowly escaped injury when only the petrol component exploded as he opened his steel front door after being lured out by a stone-throwing mob. The INLA claimed responsibility.
- 28 July: the INLA claimed responsibility for a bomb attached to a UDR soldier's car in Bellaghy, County Londonderry.
- 28 July: the INLA shot and wounded an RUC officer in a mobile patrol in the Creggan area of Derry.
- 2 August: a UDR soldier was seriously injured by a booby-trap bomb attached to his car near Queen's University Belfast.
- 5 August: former RUC Assistant Chief Constable William Meharg, who had resigned a year previously, narrowly escaped injury when a nail bomb exploded at his home in the Castlereagh Road area of Belfast. Twenty neighbouring homes were damaged and an elderly woman was treated for shock.
- 5 August: three INLA members barricaded in a flat in the University area of Belfast were arrested by the RUC. Booby-trap bomb materials were found inside and later UDR searches uncovered maps with the names of senior RUC officers.
- 14 August: a 4 lb (1.8 kg) booby-trap bomb fell off the underside of the car of a British soldier who was visiting his girlfriend in the Waterside area of Derry.
- 15 August: the INLA claimed responsibility for a van bomb defused by the British Army in Downpatrick, County Down. It consisted of a kilogram of commercial explosives rigged to an electronic detonator and booby-trap mechanism.
- 24 August: the INLA reported that a unit fired eight shots at an RUC armoured vehicle that had its doors open in the Markets area of Belfast.
- 26 August: an RUC officer was seriously injured by an INLA bomb that exploded under his car, outside of a care home in Whiteabbey, County Antrim.
- 26 August: the INLA reported that a unit ambushed a British Army patrol in the Divis Flats area of Belfast.
- 27 August: the INLA claimed responsibility for a 5 lb (2.3 kg) anti-personnel bomb rigged to a command wire in Kenard Avenue in the Andersonstown area of Belfast. The device was neutralised by the British Army in several controlled explosions.
- 27 August: the INLA opened fire on a man they claimed was a full-time RUC officer as he drove through the Short Strand area of Belfast. The INLA claimed locals witnessed him being taken away in ambulance, although this was denied by the RUC.
- 27 August: a former UDR soldier (Wilfred McIlveen) was killed by a booby-trap bomb that exploded under his car outside a social club in Milford, County Armagh. The INLA and IRA both issued statements claiming responsibility.
- 1 September: the INLA shot and seriously wounded DUP member of Belfast City Council and assumed Assembly election candidate Billy Dickinson at his home. A small bomb later exploded outside his house.
- 4 September: a 5 lb (2.3 kg) INLA bomb fell off the underside of an RUC officer's car in Patrick Street, Strabane, County Tyrone. Fifty people from nearby homes were evacuated while the device was defused.
- 11 September: the INLA warned they would act "without mercy against those responsible" for attacks on the Nationalist community in County Armagh, three days after a loyalist gun attack on the home of senior INLA member Seamus Grew.
- 14 September: an INLA bomb was spotted by a fireman's wife under their car in Crumlin, County Antrim in a suspected case of mistaken identity. The fire station was adjacent to an RUC station.
- 16 September: the INLA detonated a remote-control bomb hidden in a drainpipe as a British patrol passed Cullingtree Walk, Divis Flats, Belfast. A British soldier (Kevin Waller) and two Catholic children (Stephen Bennett and Kevin Valliday) were killed (see:1982 Divis Flats bombing).
- 20 September: the INLA claimed responsibility for bombing a radar station on Mount Gabriel, County Cork. Five INLA volunteers hijacked a car carrying an engineer to the station. They forced their way inside, tied-up several workers and planted the bombs. The INLA claimed it attacked the station because it was linked to NATO.
- 25 September: INLA members shot dead a Protestant civilian (William Nixon) at his home on Harland Walk, off Newtownards Road, Belfast. The INLA denied involvement in the attack, saying it was opposed to "random" sectarian shootings.
- 25 September: INLA members shot and seriously injured a Protestant civilian (Karen McKeown, 20) outside a church hall on Albertbridge Road in east Belfast. She died of her wounds on 17 October. The RUC believed the attack, and another murder on the same date, were retaliation for Loyalist attacks in the Markets and Short Strand areas two days earlier.
- 27 September: an INLA bomb exploded under a UDR soldier's car in the early hours of the morning in Armagh city.
- 27 September: the INLA killed a British soldier (Leon Bush) and injured two others with a booby-trap bomb attached to a security barrier on West Circular Road, Belfast.
- 7 October: an INLA unit opened fire on a UDR soldier (Fred Williamson) while he was driving his car, causing him to crash into the car of a prison officer (Elizabeth Chambers) in Kilmore, County Armagh. Both died in the collision.
- 18 October: the INLA shot and seriously injured a former UDR soldier while he was teaching a class at a primary school in Newry, County Armagh.
- 18 October: Robert Andrew Overend, the son of Unionist politician Robert Overend, was injured when an INLA roadside bomb exploded as his vehicle approached the family farm near Bellaghy, County Londonderry. It was one of several INLA attacks in the Magherafelt and wider South Londonderry area in 1982.
- 19 October: the INLA bombed the headquarters of the Ulster Unionist Party (UUP) on Glengall Street, Belfast. The building was evacuated shortly before the explosion. A suspected second device was defused nearby.
- 20 October: a bomb placed outside the home of Ulster Unionist Party (UUP) leader James Molyneaux was found and defused. It was one of two INLA attempts to assassinate Molyneaux within a 24-hour period.
- 20 October: the INLA forced the driver of a van to take a hoax bomb to a polling station at Brougham Street in North Belfast, part of a campaign to disrupt the election for the new Northern Ireland Assembly.
- 20 October: an INLA bomb attack on Belfast City Hall polling station was intercepted by British security forces and neutralised in several controlled explosions nearby. The INLA had forced the driver of a truck, hijacked in Clonard Gardens in West Belfast, to carry the bomb.
- 23 October: an INLA attack was apparently foiled after British soldiers arrested two INLA members with a rifle near the border in Derry.
- 12 November: the INLA claimed responsibility for a bomb attached to the car of an RUC officer who had retired days earlier in Magherafelt, County Londonderry.
- 16 November: the INLA shot dead two RUC officers (Ronald Irwin and Snowdon Corkey) at a security barrier in Markethill, County Armagh. INLA members fired several shots from a car before turning around and escaping the village.
- 18 November: the INLA shot and injured an off-duty UDR soldier in Strabane, County Tyrone.
- 24 November: the INLA claimed responsibility for a bomb that exploded under a barrister's car shortly after it was spotted by a security guard as she was driving into the Crumlin Road courts, Belfast. The INLA claimed the intended target was her father, a high-profile judge. The group stated the bomb was planted at the family home on the Malone Road and was their second attack in the area in recent times.
- 25 November: the INLA claimed responsibility for a bomb which destroyed a security post at the High Court in Belfast.
- 30 November: the INLA claimed responsibility for a bomb planted under an RUC officer's car in the Bellevue area of north Belfast. Several houses were damaged but there were no reported injuries.
- 3 December: the INLA shot a Housing Executive contractor in the leg in the Short Strand area of Belfast, claiming he was present to evict families from their homes.
- 6 December: Droppin Well bombing - the INLA killed 11 British soldiers and 6 civilians when it exploded a time bomb at a disco frequented by British soldiers in Ballykelly, County Londonderry.
- 12 December: undercover RUC officers shot dead two INLA volunteers (Seamus Grew and Rodney Carroll) at a vehicle checkpoint at Mullacreevie Park, Armagh. RUC intelligence believed that INLA Chief of Staff Dominic McGlinchey was a passenger in the car.
- 14 December: the INLA claimed responsibility for a bomb planted under an RUC officer's car that exploded shortly after he parked outside Castlereagh Holding Centre, Belfast. Nobody was injured.
- 14 December: a search was conducted at Stormont, Belfast, site of the Northern Ireland Assembly, after a man claiming to speak for the INLA called in a bomb warning to the police. No devices were found.

=== 1983 ===
- 28 January: the INLA planted a bomb at the home of an RUC chief superintendent off Old Holywood Road in the Belmont area of east Belfast. His teenage son spotted the device and it was neutralised in by the British Army in a controlled explosion.
- 2 February: an INLA volunteer (Eugene McMonagle) was shot dead by an undercover British Army officer during an altercation at Leafair Park, Shantallow, Derry.
- 9 March: a Protestant civilian (James Hogg) was shot dead in Armagh city centre, in retaliation for the shooting of a Catholic man by the UVF hours earlier. Lost Lives claims the INLA were "probably" responsible. Authors Holland and McDonald also attributed blame to the INLA.
- 11 March: gunmen linked to the INLA shot dead Official IRA member Eamon "Hatchet" Kerr at his home in Cape Street in the Lower Falls area of West Belfast.
- 24 April: the INLA left a 3 lb (1.4 kg) booby-trap bomb attached to a garage in the Divis Flats complex. The device was defused by the British Army after the INLA issued a statement warning the bomb was unstable.
- 6 May: the INLA shot dead one of its own members (Eric Dale) at Clontygora, near Killeen, County Armagh as an alleged informer.
- 8 May: a UDR soldier spotted a 3 lb (1.4 kg) booby-trap bomb under his van in Newmills, County Tyrone. The INLA claimed responsibility.
- 16 May: Elizabeth Kirpatrick wife of informer Harry Kirkpatrick, is kidnapped. She is later released on 25 August.
- 24 May: the INLA tried to kill an off-duty UDR soldier as he arrived for work at a furniture store in Maghera, County Londonderry. The off-duty soldier returned fire and chased the INLA member who escaped.
- 26 May: an RUC officer (Colin Carson) was shot dead by four INLA members with automatic weapons from a hijacked van outside the RUC base in Cookstown, County Tyrone. Several shots were also fired at an RUC officer manning a security sangar, the officer exited the sangar and exchanged fire with the INLA unit as they withdrew. The INLA abandoned the vehicle following a pursuit and exchange of fire with an RUC patrol, and escaped.
- 26 May: INLA members fired from a car at an RUC checkpoint in Dungannon, County Tyrone. The vehicle was hijacked from the same family as the van used in the attack in Cookstown.
- 4 June: a UDR soldier (Andrew Stinson) was killed by an INLA booby-trap bomb attached to a mechanical digger in a field at Eglish, near Dungannon, County Tyrone.
- 9 June: an INLA bomb exploded inside a hijacked petroleum tanker in west Belfast. Gunmen held the driver's family hostage and forced him to drive the tanker into Woodbourne RUC station, causing some damage to the base. The base and the surrounding area had been evacuated and there were no reported injuries.
- 16 June: the INLA planted a bomb in a video rental shop in the centre of Newry, County Down. After the bomb exploded snipers opened fire from a block of flats, seriously injuring an RUC detective and grazing another RUC officer.
- 30 June: the INLA planted two small bombs on board a gas tanker which was abandoned outside the RUC station in the centre of Newry, County Down. Although the explosives detonated causing extensive damage, firemen prevented the tanker itself from exploding averting widespread devastation.
- 13 July: a former INLA volunteer (Eamon McMahon) was found shot dead in his car, Glasdrumman, near Crossmaglen, County Armagh. Another man (Patrick Mackin) described by CAIN as a Catholic civilian, was also found shot in McMahon's car. It has never been officially established who was responsible or why but McMahon was a brother-in-law of Eric Dale. It was reported in the Irish Independent that Dominic and Mary McGlinchey killed both men.
- 27 July: four UDR soldiers in a vehicle narrowly escaped injury when a 3–4 lb (1.4–1.8 kg) INLA time bomb exploded as they arrived to open a security gate at the junction of Castle Street and Queen Street in Belfast city centre. The blast damaged a search shelter and shattered windows in nearby buildings.
- 13 August: undercover RUC officers shot dead two INLA members (Gerard Mallon and Brendan Convery) as they attacked RUC Reserve officers (seriously wounding one) manning a security barrier in Dungannon, County Tyrone. Earlier that same day the INLA launched a similar attack at a security barrier in Markethill, County Armagh, in which an RUC officer was injured.
- 17 August: INLA members raked Newry courthouse and an RUC Land Rover with automatic fire from a passing car. However the attack was foiled when a lorry, carrying a 40-foot container, stopped between the gunmen and the courthouse. There were no injuries.
- 6 September: the INLA shot dead a RUC officer (John Wasson) outside his home at Dukes Grove, off Cathedral Road, Armagh.
- 12 September: an INLA unit opened fire on RUC officers investigating a fire at a school on Armagh Road, Newry.
- 19 September: the INLA opened fire on a group of RUC officers in Newry.
- 23 September: an INLA unit fired several shots at a British Army patrol at the junction of Buncrana Road and Springtown Park, Derry.
- 14 October: an alleged INLA plot to kidnap the wife and daughter of Lord Chief Justice of Northern Ireland Sir Robert Lowry at an equestrian event in County Sligo was foiled by Gardaí. Two Garda went to investigate three Northern Ireland registered vehicles when they were confronted by an armed gang of eight men. Both officers were taken hostage and eventually freed at Kilnaleck, County Cavan.
- 26 October: the INLA shot dead a former member (Gerard Barkley) near Redhills, County Cavan. An INLA statement issued from the Republic claimed he was an informer while the Belfast INLA claimed he was killed by British agents. The actual reason was Barkley had angered the INLA chief of staff by committing robberies for personal gain.
- 2 November: an INLA bomb was discovered under a lorry driven by a concrete firm employee in Derry.
- 4 November: a 200 lb (91 kg) van bomb exploded outside a bar on Patrick street, Strabane. The explosion demolished the bar, seriously injured 13 people (including 3 RUC officers) and another 16 people had minor injuries that did not require hospital attention. The INLA's intended target were three off-duty RUC officers inside.
- 20 November: gunmen opened fire on a Protestant church service in Darkley, killing 3 churchmen (David Wilson, Harold Brown, and Victor Cunningham). The attack was claimed by the "Catholic Reaction Force", an INLA covername.
- 2 December: the INLA injured two youths in punishment shooting in the Lower Falls area of Belfast, they were accused of endangering Divis Flats residents by driving around the complex in stolen cars.
- 2 December: Gardaí discovered by chance the safe house of INLA chief of staff Dominic McGlinchey in the Carrigtohill area of Cork. The unarmed officers were stripped of their uniforms and tied up and the INLA members escaped
- 5 December: the Ulster Volunteer Force (UVF) shot dead an INLA volunteer (Joseph Craven) from a passing motorcycle shortly after Craven left the Department of Health and Social Services office, Church Road, Newtownabbey, County Antrim.
- 17 December: an INLA time bomb exploded minutes before members of British security forces arrived to open a security gate at the junction of Castle Street and Queen Street in Belfast city centre. The blast demolished a search shelter and damaged nearby buildings. The attack was "virtually a carbon copy" of a previous INLA bombing at the same barrier in July 1983.
- 18 December: a group of INLA members led by Dominic McGlinchey stripped Gardaí manning a checkpoint of their uniforms and restrained them after being stopped at a routine checkpoint near Enniscorthy, County Wexford.

=== 1984 ===
- 12 January: an RUC Reserve officer was seriously injured by an INLA bomb attached to his car in Newtownabbey, County Antrim. A second RUC Reserve officer suffered a burst eardrum and shock.
- 20 January: the INLA shot dead a UDR soldier (Colin Houston) at his home on Sunnymede Avenue, Dunmurry.
- 28 January: the INLA shot and seriously wounded an RUC Reserve officer in Kilkeel, County Down. He returned fire and injured one of his attackers.
- 28 February: the INLA stole several firearms and a quantity of ammunition from a premises in Newry.
- 15 March: an anti-personnel bomb which failed to explode was defused by the British Army at Dunfield Terrace in the Waterside area of Derry, three days after an INLA warning.
- 17 March: Dominic McGlinchey, then considered leader of the Irish National Liberation Army (INLA), was recaptured after an exchange of gunfire with a team of Garda Security Task Force (STF) detectives at a house in Newmarket-on-Fergus, County Clare. One officer was seriously injured, a priest negotiated the surrender of the besieged INLA men after Gardaí forced their way inside the house.
- 2 April: the INLA burnt out a vacant house in the Galliagh area of Derry, claiming it was a British Army spy post. They further stated they had left a 300 lb (140 kg) landmine nearby targeting British security forces, but had retrieved it because of the presence of civilians.
- 4 April: the INLA reported detonating a 15 lb (6.8 kg) bomb by command wire on Whiterock Road, West Belfast, as a British Army patrol passed. The main force of the explosion was deflected by a corrugated iron fence and a mound of earth; a soldier escaped with temporary deafness and shock. Two men were arrested near the firing point by another patrol.
- 13 April: the INLA shot dead an alleged local criminal (John George) identified by CAIN as a Catholic civilian, at his home on Thornhill Crescent, Twinbrook, Belfast.
- 16 April: INLA members forced the driver of a carbon dioxide tanker to abandon the lorry with a bomb onboard at Grosvenor Road RUC station, Belfast. British Army experts determined the device was a hoax.
- 18 April: the INLA reported an attempt to kill a senior RUC officer at his South Belfast home. Armed INLA members forcibly entered and took his wife prisoner, but left after he failed to appear.
- 24 April: the INLA telephoned a warning of a bomb planted at the council officers in Newry, County Down. British security forces couldn't find any device, although the INLA caller insisted it was there.
- 4 May: the INLA hijacked a lorry carrying gas cylinders and forced the driver to take an incendiary device to Woodbourne RUC station, West Belfast. The INLA opened fire on RUC officers as they evacuated the area. The device later detonated and several gas cylinders exploded.
- 6 May: four armed and uniformed INLA volunteers tried to take the platform at a Sinn Féin rally commemorating the 1981 Hunger Strike but were blocked by stewards. They were protesting Sinn Féin's refusal to allow any speakers from the IRSP at the event.
- 28 May: a bomb attack targeting British soldiers on the Ballymurphy Road, Belfast, was foiled by the RUC. INLA members were arrested in two houses they had taken over for the operation. A 40 lb (18 kg) bomb planted nearby was defused.
- 15 June: a RUC officer (Michael Todd) and an INLA volunteer (Paul McCann) were shot dead during a gun battle on Lenadoon Avenue, Belfast. The RUC had surrounded an INLA unit who had taken up position in a house. Two other RUC officers were reportedly seriously injured, and an AK-47 rifle recovered was forensically linked to an attack on a British Army patrol at Broadway, Belfast in May 1984.
- 26 June: the INLA's South Antrim Brigade claimed responsibility for a hoax car bomb outside a bar in Antrim town. The device was declared safe after the British Army carried out a controlled explosion.
- 16 July: the INLA reported firing several shots at a British Army mobile patrol at the Monagh bypass in Belfast. No hits were claimed.
- 17 July: the INLA reported firing several shots at a joint British Army/RUC patrol in the Ballymurphy area of Belfast. No hits were claimed.
- 11 August: an INLA attempt to ambush RUC officers failed and a four-man INLA unit were arrested following a car chase in Dunmurry on the outskirts of Belfast.
- 13 August: the INLA claimed responsibility for two small arms attacks on British soldiers at the junction of the Falls Road and Donegall Road, Belfast.
- 17 August: the INLA claimed responsibility for a 10 lb (4.5 kg) anti-personnel mine concealed near Areema Drive in the Twinbrook area of west Belfast. The group claimed only the detonator had exploded. The device was neutralised by the British Army in two controlled explosions.
- 1 September: INLA members hijacked a bread van and emptied its contents while shouting "free bread" and "no more tax" in Walkinstown, Dublin. In a statement the group said the incident was a protest against recent cuts to food subsidies, and claimed loaves of bread were distributed to residents of flats in Bluebell, Dublin.
- 2 September: the INLA shot and seriously wounded a man in Newry in a punishment shooting. His leg was amputated as a consequence.
- 28 September: an INLA attempt to kill a UDR man in Armagh fails.
- 18 October: the INLA shot and badly wounded an eighteen-year-old in a punishment shooting in Strabane, County Tyrone for alleged "anti-social activities".
- 30 October: the INLA shot and injured a man for alleged anti-social behaviour in North Belfast.
- December: an INLA attempt to kill a UDR soldier failed, according to authors Holland and McDonald.
- 3 December: the INLA claimed responsibility for several hoax bombs planted in Dublin. In a statement the INLA said it was a protest at the alleged threat to Irish neutrality posed by Ireland's membership of the EEC.
- 16 December: the INLA exploded a 60 lb (27 kg) car bomb outside a bar in Holywood, County Down. Nobody was injured. The INLA later claimed their target were British soldiers who usually loitered outside, but because of bad weather they didn't.
- 16 December: the INLA tried to kill Derry DUP councillor Gregory Campbell by planting a bomb under his car but the device fell off and was defused.
- 24 December: an assassination attempt targeting SAS officer Brian Baty was foiled by an informer. The INLA team were arrested outside a pub in Liverpool where the bomb was to be collected. The operation was intended to target members of the British military and political establishment. The same informer was responsible for the arrest of another INLA team in a quarry in Somerset in 1993.

=== 1985 ===
- 3 January: an INLA attack was foiled after the RUC raided a flat where an armed INLA active service unit was preparing in the Unity Flats area of Belfast.
- 4 January: British security forces carried out searches following an alleged INLA claim of abandoning an anti-personnel bomb after an aborted ambush in Collon Lane, Derry. The INLA's Derry Brigade later issued a statement denying involvement.
- 7 January: an INLA unit fired over twenty shots at an RUC mobile patrol as it entered Mountpottinger RUC station in the Short Strand area of Belfast.
- 11 January: an INLA unit carried out a failed attempt to assassinate Reverend Ian Paisley in Belfast. INLA volunteers went to his church where they believed he was to give a sermon but somebody else stood in for him that morning. The volunteers were spotted and the operation was aborted. In an interview with journalist Vincent Browne an INLA representative said regarding the action:

We see Paisley and indeed all shades of Loyalism as manifested in politicians as being another weapon in the armoury of Britain and as such, we would contend that they are as legitimate targets as the British soldiers.

- 16 January: an INLA unit fired several shots at an RUC mobile patrol in the vicinity of Mountpottinger RUC station in the Short Strand area of Belfast.
- 18 January: INLA members lobbed a bomb over the wall of the Royal Courts of Justice and it struck an armoured car, used to ferry judges and Crown prosecutors. A prosecutor instead of the targeted senior judge was in the car.
- 21 January: the INLA fired several shots at an RUC Reserve officer's car in an attack at Downe Hospital, Downpatrick, County Down, but he was uninjured. A hoax bomb was found at the firing point on a hill nearby.
- 23 January: an INLA unit fired several shots at an RUC mobile patrol in the Unity Flats area of Belfast. Several shots struck the armoured Land Rover but there no injuries.
- 17 February: the INLA were responsible for several bomb hoaxes in Belfast.
- 24 February: the INLA shot dead a former UDR soldier (Douglas McElhinney) on Glenvale Road, off Northland Road, Derry.
- 27 February: an INLA van bomb destroyed a petrol station near Windsor Park, Belfast. Earlier in the day the English football team played a match against Northern Ireland in the stadium and an INLA statement warned there would be further such attacks. Several high-profile sporting events were cancelled as a result.
- March: Sinn Féin alleged that the INLA were responsible for the kidnapping of a publican's daughter in Derry. She was released after the IRA threatened to shoot those responsible.
- 6 March: the INLA attempted to kill a UDR soldier in the area of Strabane, County Tyrone.
- 14 March: former senior IRSP/INLA member Harry Flynn was shot in the leg in Dublin. Internal dispute.
- 10 April: the INLA planted a remote-detonation shrapnel bomb in the Greenhaw Road area of Derry, unsuccessfully attempting to lure RUC officers to the vicinity by firing a shot.
- 11 April: three INLA bombs planted on the Belfast-Dublin train were defused by bomb disposal experts near the border.
- 20 April: the INLA claimed responsibility for two incendiary devices planted in a department store in Dublin which was selling South African goods, in protest against the apartheid regime. There were no injuries as the building had been cleared following a telephone warning.
- 25 April: the INLA claimed responsibility for two bombs planted under the car and caravan of an RUC officer in Auglish Court in the Waterside area of Derry. One device exploded prematurely.
- 9 May: the INLA abducted and killed a former member of the organisation (Seamus Ruddy) in France. The 32-year-old from Newry, County Down was found at Pont-de-l’Arche, near Rouen in northern France in May 2017.
- 14 May: the INLA claimed responsibility for two incendiary devices planted in business premises in Belfast city centre.
- 15 May: INLA snipers opened fire on RUC officers, who returned fire, in the Galliagh area of Derry.
- 24 May: an RUC officer was injured after several shots were fired at a police patrol in Spencer Road, Derry. RUC officers returned fire. It was one of several gun attacks on the security forces by the INLA in Derry that summer, including another incident in which an RUC officer was injured.
- 31 May: the INLA tried to assassinate IRSP/INLA member Gerry Roche in Cratloe near Shannon, County Clare. Internal dispute. Allegedly, the INLA Chief of Staff John O'Reilly's gun jammed, and a second attacker fired several shots but missed. A third gunman refused to fire at his former party chairman.
- 13 June: INLA members took over a vacant house in the Poleglass area of Belfast, then shot the owner when he returned and assaulted another man. One of the perpetrators was himself shot two days later.
- 15 June: INLA members shot another INLA member several times in the Twinbrook area of Belfast. An IRSP statement claimed British agents who had infiltrated the INLA were responsible. Internal dispute.
- 22 June: the INLA claimed responsibility for a bomb attack at a pub in Banbridge, County Down, which injured two RUC officers. The INLA claimed the premises was targeted because it was frequented by members of British security forces.
- 27 June: a Garda officer (Patrick Morrissey) was killed following the robbery of a post office in Ardee, County Louth. Two INLA members were later charged and sentenced to death.
- 27 June: INLA members were arrested and a bomb attack targeting British security forces was foiled after the RUC raided a house in Fallswater Street, off the Falls Road, Belfast.
- 28 June: the INLA claimed it shot two undercover British soldiers in Downpatrick, County Down. Shots were heard in the Ballymote Walk area of town but British security forces delayed a follow-up operation, fearing an ambush. The RUC stated it had no reports of soldiers missing.
- 7 July: an INLA bomb exploded outside a pub in Banbridge, County Down, slightly injuring one person. The INLA claimed the premises was targeted because it was frequented by members of British security forces.
- 19 July: a prison officer escaped injury when an INLA bomb was discovered under his car outside his home in Curryneerin near Derry.
- 27 July: an INLA bomb planted inside a pub in Newry was removed by a customer and later defused by the British Army.
- 8 August: a planned INLA gun attack on RUC officers on duty on the Whitewell Road, Newtownabbey, County Antrim was aborted in unclear circumstances. An INLA member reportedly injured themselves in a negligent discharge incident.
- 9 August: a train travelling from Belfast to Dublin was severely damaged after the INLA planted several incendiary bombs in the carriages. Passengers were evacuated at Newry, County Down after phone calls warning of the attack.
- 11 August: the INLA claimed responsibility for a booby-trap bomb attached to an RUC officer's car in Banbridge, County Down.
- 24 August: the INLA informed the RUC they had left a bomb under a bridge at Killeavy, South Armagh. The bomb was actually rigged to the doorbell of a nearby home whose owner they had taken hostage, intended for the security forces. A neighbour who called to warn of the bomb alert was seriously injured.
- 29 August: the INLA exploded a bomb on a train outside the Belfast central railway station injuring seven RUC officers and two members of the train stations staff and badly damaging a number of carriages.
- 8 September: a 5 lb (2.3 kg) under-car magnet bomb was found detached at a farmhouse in Newtownhamilton, County Armagh. The INLA claimed two members of the security forces lived there but this was denied; their father had been a UDR soldier (Sidney Watt) but he had been killed by the IRA in 1973.
- 9 September: an INLA member from County Dublin (James Burnett) was found shot dead in Killeen, County Armagh, as an alleged informer.
- 23 September: an INLA bomb exploded at a shooting range frequented by members of British security forces at Campsey, County Londonderry.
- 27 September: a former UDR soldier was injured when a bomb exploded under his car at Drumahoe on the outskirts of Derry. The INLA claimed responsibility.
- 28 September: an INLA bomb exploded at a UDR soldier's house in Newmills, County Tyrone.
- 29 September: an INLA incendiary bomb left in a nightclub exploded in Newry, County Down. The intended targets were off-duty RUC officers known to frequent the club. Two employees were seriously injured, one losing a hand and another suffering damaged eyes.
- 10 October: INLA members based in Coalisland, County Tyrone, were arrested while transporting a bomb in a car. Allegedly, they told police they were intending to bomb the Seagoe Hotel in Portadown, where a disco was being held, but intended to give a warning.
- 24 October: the INLA claimed responsibility for a 10 lb (4.5 kg) time bomb hidden in a utility access hatch on Shipquay Street in Derry city centre. The INLA said it was intended to detonate while RUC officers investigated hoax bomb alerts the previous night.
- 12 November: two bombs planted by the INLA were defused outside Chelsea Barracks in London.

=== 1986 ===
- 3 January: the INLA kidnapped a businessman in Derry. He was found several days later in the Shantallow area of Derry by the RUC following a large-scale search operation. Sinn Féin alleged it was the fourth INLA kidnapping in Derry in ten months.
- 14 January: the INLA claimed responsibility for a booby-trap bomb attached to an RUC officer's car in Downpatrick, County Down.
- 27 March: the INLA hijacked a van in Newry and rigged a bomb aboard, intending to kill RUC officers. The attack was either aborted or foiled by security forces.
- 3 April: the INLA claimed responsibility for a bomb planted in the council offices in Newry. The RUC had previously used the premises.
- 5 April: a bomb exploded prematurely in the King Arthur Bar in Belfast city centre seriously injuring the two INLA volunteers assembling the device. Two civilians present were also treated for injuries. The explosion blew out the windows of the pub, showering glass on the street below.
- 14 April: the INLA claimed to have left a bomb in the council offices in Downpatrick, County Down. The British Army carried out a controlled explosion on a device a few days later.
- 28 April: INLA incendiary devices badly damaged offices at Newry and Mourne council headquarters.
- Summer: an INLA vigilante patrol fired shots at delinquents ("hoods") near the Divis Flats, Belfast. British soldiers nearby believed themselves the target and responded.
- 10 May: the INLA claimed responsibility for a bomb that exploded in a bar in Limavady, County Londonderry. The group gave a 30-minute warning but it exploded within 10 minutes, with staff and customers narrowly escaping injury. The INLA claimed soldiers from the nearby British Army base at Ballykelly frequented the premises.
- 15 May: INLA carried out a sniper attack on the RUC in Derry, according to authors Holland and McDonald.
- 28 August: the INLA claimed responsibility for bomb attacks across Northern Ireland: two proxy car bombs exploded outside the RUC bases in Newry and Downpatrick, a third bomb exploded in a disused factory in Derry (which security forces said was designed to lure them to a booby-trap bomb left in a car) and a fifth and sixth bombs exploded in Antrim, one of which was found under an RUC officer's car. A seventh bomb exploded in the toilets of Belfast Central Railway station. Later the INLA warned of a series of bombs planted in Belfast but the RUC and British Army determined they were all hoaxes.
- 30 August: a taxi driver was abducted by the INLA and forced to leave a car bomb outside a pub in Antrim, which later exploded causing extensive damage. The owner of the taxi firm was threatened with death unless he made a public statement refusing to accept fares from security force members. Pubs who served members of the security forces were also threatened.
- 10 September: a contractor in Derry announced they would no longer be carrying out work for British security forces, following an INLA threat.
- 22 September: a 50 lb (23 kg) INLA bomb left outside the British Legion hall in Killyleagh, Co. Down was defused by the British Army.
- 28 September: the INLA claimed responsibility for a 40 lb (18 kg) bomb planted outside a pub in Downpatrick, County Down, which they alleged served off-duty members of the security forces. An RUC officer carried the bomb to a field about 80 yards (73 m) away, where it exploded after 15 minutes. Later the RUC intercepted a three-car convoy carrying bombs nearby and four people were arrested. One car exploded as a British Army bomb disposal team attempted to defuse it, another escaped after crashing through the checkpoint and being fired on by RUC officers.
- 28 September: the INLA claimed responsibility for bomb alerts in three towns in Northern Ireland. Although hundreds were evacuated, they were determined to be hoaxes by British security forces.
- 14 October: an INLA member shot and injured an RUC officer who had just driven out of Oldpark RUC station, north Belfast.
- 24 October: a 60 lb (27 kg) car bomb outside a pub in Banbridge, County Down, was neutralised via controlled explosions by the British Army. The INLA, who had targeted the same pub twice in 1985, were suspected.
- 29 October: two INLA members were arrested at an arms dump near Downpatrick, County Down. One man was charged with having a rifle with intent to endanger life, armed robbery, hijacking, extortion and INLA membership.
- 20 November: at least fifteen INLA members were photographed by journalists posing with automatic weapons in an undisclosed location in South Armagh. The incident angered Unionist politicians and Northern Ireland Office Minister Nicholas Scott endorsed new laws to combat paramilitary displays in response.
- 24 November: the INLA hurled a grenade at the home of Unionist Party Councillor Sam McCarney in Downpatrick; it failed to detonate and was later defused by the British Army.
- 9 December: an INLA bomb hidden at a garage near the border on the Newry-Dundalk road was defused by the British Army following an alert from the group. The INLA claimed a second device was still in the vicinity.
- 21 December : the breakaway Irish People's Liberation Organisation (IPLO) shot dead an INLA volunteer (Thomas McCartan) in Belfast. It marked the beginning of a feud between the two republican groups.

=== 1987 ===
- 1 January: a 72-year-old woman (Iris Farley) was shot and seriously injured when the INLA carried out a gun attack on the home of a UDR soldier in Markethill, Co. Armagh. She died five weeks later. The soldier, the woman's son, was also injured. The INLA claimed that a 15 lb (6.8 kg) bomb intended for British security forces responding failed to explode.
- 1 January: part of the Newry-Dundalk road in County Armagh closed after the INLA claimed to have abandoned a bomb there. After several days searching British security forces found a bomb in a gas cylinder.
- 1 January: the INLA claimed a UDR soldier triggered only the detonator of a bomb left outside his home in Bessbrook, County Armagh, and had afterward contacted the group to inform them he was resigning from the regiment. The British Army refused to comment but the RUC confirmed a device had been dealt with in the area.
- 8 January: the INLA claimed responsibility for shooting and wounding unionist politician David Calvert as he got into his car outside his business at Craigavon Shopping Centre, County Armagh. His eleven-year-old daughter narrowly escaped injury. The INLA said he was targeted for "outspoken and bigoted utterances against the nationalist community."
- 20 January: the IPLO shot dead INLA members Thomas 'Ta' Power and John O'Reilly in Rossnaree Hotel, Drogheda, County Louth (See:Rosnaree Hotel shooting).
- 28 January: the IPLO tried to kill INLA member Emmanuel Gargan in the Lower Ormeau, Belfast. He was wounded in another attempt two days later.
- 30 January: the INLA claimed responsibility for a major fire at council offices in Newry, County Armagh. The group claimed four incendiary offices had been planted, three of which detonated. A suspect device was also attached to an entrance gate.
- 31 January: Mary McGlinchey, an INLA activist and wife of INLA leader Dominic McGlinchey was shot dead at her home in Dundalk, County Louth. The identities of the perpetrators are unknown.
- 5 February: the INLA shot dead a member of the IPLO (Tony McCluskey) in Middletown, County Armagh as part of a republican feud.
- 18 February: the IPLO shot dead an INLA volunteer (Michael Kearney) in the Ballymurphy area of Belfast as part of a republican feud.
- 5 March: crude incendiary devices started fires in the high-security cells of two prisoners in Portlaoise Prison. Prison sources claimed it was linked to the ongoing INLA feud.
- 7 March: the INLA shot dead a member of the IPLO (Thomas Maguire) near Forkill as part of a republican feud.
- 10 March: the IPLO shot and wounded the chairman of the IRSP Kevin McQuillan at his home in Springfield Park, Belfast. His brother was also wounded in the attack.
- 14 March: the INLA shot dead an IPLO member (Fergus Conlon) near Forkill as part of a republican feud.
- 15 March: the INLA attacked the car of IPLO member Gerard Steenson in Ballymurphy, Belfast. Steenson and his passenger (Tony McCarthy, also a member of the IPLO) were killed, as part of a republican feud.
- 21 March: the IPLO shot dead an INLA volunteer (Emmanuel Gargan) in the Hatfield Bar, Belfast, as part of a republican feud.
- 22 March: the IPLO shot dead an INLA volunteer (Kevin Duffy) in Armagh as part of a republican feud.
- 26 June: Elizabeth Nicholson, the wife of Unionist politician Jim Nicholson, escaped unharmed after several shots were fired at her while she was driving. The RUC believed a gang led by Dessie O'Hare was responsible.
- 2 August: several shots were fired at an RUC patrol, who took cover, in the Melmount area of Strabane, County Tyrone. It was one of several shooting attacks in the Melmount area that weekend. An alleged INLA member was later charged with attempted murder.
- 7 August: the INLA "North-West Command", who gave no code word, claimed responsibility for a bomb attack in the Melmount area of Strabane, County Tyrone and accused the IRA of taking credit. The RUC denied any bomb attack occurred.
- 4 October: the "South Armagh INLA" claimed responsibility for a man found shot dead (James McDaid) in an abandoned car near Crossmaglen, County Armagh. The INLA denied responsibility. The gang led by Dessie O'Hare was blamed.
- 10 October: an INLA member (Colm Maguire) died in Portlaoise prison shortly after ending a hunger strike.
- 14 October: Dessie O'Hare and three other INLA members, calling themselves the "Irish Revolutionary Brigade" or "Independent South Armagh INLA", kidnapped John O'Grady, a dentist from Dublin, and demanded a IR£1.5m ransom. The gang had intended to seize Austin Darragh, owner of the Institute of Clinical Pharmacology, but Darragh had moved three years previously from the house, which was occupied by O'Grady, his son-in-law.
- 27 October: Dessie O'Hare's gang escaped with kidnapped Dublin dentist John O’Grady from Gardaí after an exchange of gunfire at Ballyedmond near Midleton, County Cork. A Garda patrol became suspicious of a container on a farm and as reinforcements arrived they were ambushed by members of the gang.
- 5 November: John O'Grady was rescued by Gardaí in Cabra, North Dublin, only an hour before a £1.5m ransom was due to be handed over. A Garda detective was seriously wounded in the gun battle. The kidnappers escaped by taking two civilians hostage and forcing them to drive to Limerick.
- 27 November: an INLA member (Martin Bryan) was shot dead at an Irish Defence Forces check point in Urlingford, County Kilkenny. He was travelling in a car with Dessie O'Hare who was shot eight times during the exchange of fire before being arrested. A soldier was also wounded in the incident.
- 8 December: a civilian (Patrick Cunningham) was found shot dead in an outbuilding at an unoccupied farm, Errybane, near Castleblayney, County Monaghan on 8 December 1987. He had been abducted in May 1987; it is believed the killing was related to the INLA/IPLO feud.

=== 1988 ===
- 18 January: a suspected informer survived being shot by the INLA following six days of interrogation in Downpatrick, County Down.
- 25 April: the INLA sent threats to workers at the Department of Health and Social Services in Derry. They alleged an outside DHSS team was investigating social security fraud in the city. The INLA withdrew their threat the next day after thirty labour exchanges went on strike in protest.
- 7 May: two INLA members with sledgehammers, covered by a third INLA member with a submachine gun, destroyed slot machines in two bars in Greysteel, County Londonderry. The INLA stated the attacks were carried out because of pressure from the "working class" who were "plagued with these addictive machines".
- 13 June: the INLA claimed responsibility for an incendiary device planted at an international bowls tournament being held at Ward Park, Bangor, County Down which was to involve the Israeli bowling team. An INLA statement said the attack was "in solidarity with Palestinians expelled from their lands". The tournament was cancelled the following weekend after another INLA threat.
- 6 August: an INLA gunmen entered a bar in Sion Mills, County Tyrone, intending to kill a UDR soldier and also an alleged member of the UVF. When he discovered his intended targets were absent, the INLA member fired a single shot and issued a warning.
- 10 August: the British Army shot dead an INLA member (James McPhilemy) during a gun attack on a vehicle checkpoint in Clady, County Tyrone. The two other INLA members involved escaped across the border after a brief gun battle with British soldiers. McPhilemy was armed with only a pistol; Sinn Féin president Gerry Adams described the operation as "suicidal" and called on the INLA to disband.
- 17 August: the INLA shot dead an ex-member of the UVF (Frederick Otley) at his shop on the Shankill Road, Belfast.
- 2 September: the INLA claimed responsibility for a gun attack on an RUC mobile patrol in Bombay Street in West Belfast. RUC officers returned fire.
- 3 November: the INLA shot and injured an RUC officer in Warringstown, County Down as he collected his four-year-old son at school.
- 18 December: a caller using a recognised INLA codeword claimed that four explosive devices had been planted at a hotel in Dunmurray, Belfast.
- 24 December: the INLA reported they opened fire on an RUC foot patrol in the Whiterock area of West Belfast. The RUC instead said several shots had been fired at New Barnsley RUC station.

=== 1989 ===
- 17 February: the INLA shot and wounded a former UDR soldier in Main Street, Ballynahinch, County Down. A woman nearby was also injured.
- 29 July: the INLA reported firing shots at a British Army checkpoint on the Monagh Road, Belfast.
- 7 August: the INLA claimed responsibility for a sniper attack on the Camel's Hump checkpoint at Lifford Road, Strabane, County Tyrone.
- 11 August: the INLA reported firing at a joint British Army-RUC patrol as they entered New Barnsley RUC base, Belfast.
- 16 August: the INLA claimed responsibility for a gun attack on New Barnsley RUC base, Belfast, and later an RUC patrol emerging from the main entrance.
- 17 August: the Belfast Telegraph reported an INLA sniper fired a single shot at Strabane RUC station, County Tyrone. The INLA reported instead that they directed automatic fire inside the compound. The INLA also claimed to have struck a British soldier in his flak jacket while covering their withdrawal. It was one of several INLA gun attacks on British Army checkpoints in the region in 1989.
- 20 August: an INLA sniper fired on the Camel's Hump checkpoint at Lifford Road, Strabane, County Tyrone with a .303 rifle. Contrarily, the INLA reported that they fired several shots at British soldiers present and claimed an ambulance was witnessed at the site shortly afterwards.
- 24 August: the INLA hijacked a taxi in Knockavoe Crescent, Strabane, and ordered the driver to take a package to the Camel's Hump checkpoint. The RUC stopped the vehicle over 100m short of its target and a hundred families living nearby were evacuated while the British Army determined the bomb was a hoax.
- 24 August: the INLA claimed responsibility for a gun attack on Strabane RUC station and claimed to have hit a British soldier. The RUC denied any injuries were incurred.
- 28 August: an INLA sniper fired on a joint British Army-RUC checkpoint in Strabane, County Tyrone with a .303 rifle.
- 14 September: the INLA fired several shots at the RUC station at Newry Road, Armagh town.
- 25 September: Belfast Brigade of the INLA claimed responsibility the wounding of John Heuston and Thomas McCaughey in Moyard Parade, stating they had done it due to their involvement in drug dealing.
- 29 September: the INLA fired several shots at an RUC armoured vehicle travelling along Friary Road in Armagh town.
- 29 December: the INLA threatened to kill a man living in Strabane, County Tyrone unless he left the country within 48 hours. An INLA spokesman claimed the man had been involved in anti-social behaviour.

== 1990s ==
=== 1990 ===
- 22 July: an alleged informant being interrogated by the INLA was rescued by RUC officers in the Ardoyne area of Belfast. The INLA had been intending to kill him but the RUC intervened and arrested two senior INLA men.
- 1 September: three armed INLA members appeared on stage at a social function in the Shantallow area of Derry and read a statement declaring that the "armed struggle" would continue.
- 29 September: the INLA issued a threat to journalists who "confuse" their organisation with the rival IPLO that they would "bear the consequences".
- 12 November: undercover British soldiers shot dead an INLA volunteer (Alexander Patterson) after a drive-by-shooting targeting the home of an off-duty UDR soldier in Victoria Bridge near Strabane, County Tyrone. The UDR soldier and his family had moved out beforehand so an SAS unit could take up positions inside and return fire. Two INLA gunmen fled the vehicle after it crashed but Alexander, the driver, allegedly believed he was safe because he was an informer and had tipped off the security forces about the attack.
- 21 November: the INLA claimed they fired shots at Rosemount RUC station, Derry. Witnesses reported hearing gunfire and spent bullet casings were found in the vicinity. The INLA said the attack was in "retaliation for recent raids on homes within the nationalist community."
- 24 November: the INLA claimed responsibility for a gun attack targeting North Queen Street RUC station, Belfast. The RUC returned fire. Later, the INLA opened fire on British soldiers in nearby Henry Street and a second gun battle took place.
- 7 December: the INLA claimed responsibility for several shots fired in the Ring Road area of Armagh city; the target was unclear.
- 13 December: the INLA opened fire on a British Army permanent observation post in Bishop Street in Derry city centre. No British soldiers were reported injured.

=== 1991 ===
- 29 June: the INLA shot dead one of its own members (Gerard Burns) as an alleged informer. Burns' body was found at the back of a house in New Barnsley Park, Ballymurphy, Belfast.
- 10 August: the INLA was blamed for a proxy bomb hoax incident in a predominantly Protestant housing estate in Downpatrick, County Down. The incident was believed to be retaliation for a failed UFF bomb attack against a nearby Catholic estate the previous month.
- 15 August: the INLA carried out a gun attack on the home of an RUC officer in Armagh, County Armagh. The policeman's wife escaped injury after gunmen fired ten bullets into a bedroom.
- 18 October: the INLA fired several shots at the security barrier beside Strand Road RUC base in Derry. There were no reported injuries.
- 28 November: INLA gunmen took over the North Down home of Lawrence Kennedy, leader of the Conservative Party in Northern Ireland, and held his family hostage while waiting for him to return from a medical conference in England. His wife activated a hidden alarm and the gunmen surrendered to a Catholic priest when the RUC surrounded the house.
- 21 December: the INLA shot dead a Protestant civilian (Robin Farmer) at his family's shop, Killyman Street, Moy; his father, a former RUC officer, was the intended target. The IRA had tried to kill Farmer's father earlier in 1991 with an under-car bomb.

=== 1992 ===
- 13 March: the INLA claimed responsibility for slightly wounding a Protestant taxi driver in a gun attack at York Street Station, Belfast. An off-duty RUC officer fired on the INLA members' escape car, causing it to crash and forcing them to escape on-foot. One man was arrested nearby. The INLA claimed the taxi driver was involved in loyalist paramilitary activity.
- April: the INLA claimed responsibility for shots fired at an RUC checkpoint in West Belfast, according to authors Holland and McDonald.
- 13 April: the INLA shot a British soldier (Michael Newman) outside the recruiting office where he worked, in Derby, England. He died of his wounds the following day.
- 13 April: the INLA fired several shots at soldiers manning the British Army observation post atop the high-rise Templar House apartments in the New Lodge area of Belfast.
- 13 April: two armed men claiming to be INLA members hijacked a taxi in Craigavon, County Armagh. Security forces later carried out an operation to clear the abandoned vehicle.
- 18 June: twelve incendiary devices were planted in various stores in Leeds, England. Four of the devices detonated, causing over £50,000 worth of damages. Two INLA volunteers were convicted of conspiracy to cause arson, Eamonn O'Donnell was jailed for twenty years and Sean Cruickshank for 15 years.
- 24 August: the INLA claimed responsibility for seriously injuring a Protestant civilian in a shooting on Oldpark Road, Belfast. A getaway car, hijacked earlier, was later found abandoned in the Ardoyne area.
- 1 October: the INLA claimed responsibility for injuring a Protestant civilian at his home in a shooting in the Annadale area of south Belfast. His family denied he was a member of any Loyalist paramilitary organisation.
- 10 December: the INLA shot and seriously injured a Belfast City Council employee. The INLA's claim of responsibility named a different individual; their intended target was the victim's brother, leading UFF member Joe Bratty.
- 24 December: the INLA launched a gun attack on Woodbourne RUC station, West Belfast. No injuries were reported. The attack was carried out during the Provisional IRA's three-day Christmas ceasefire.
- 24 December: the INLA lobbed an improvised grenade at Rosemount RUC station, Derry. The device failed to explode and was neutralised by the British Army.
- 29 December: the INLA claimed responsibility for the attempted killing of a taxi driver on the Ormeau Road, Belfast. A lone gunman fired several shots before fleeing.

=== 1993 ===
- January: the INLA carried out an attack on the British Army observation post in the Divis Flats area of Belfast, according to the IRSP's American support group.
- 14 January: the INLA claimed responsibility for attempting to kill UVF Chief of Staff John "Bunter" Graham. He was hit by rifle shots fired through the window of his home in the Shankill area of Belfast but survived.
- 21 January: the INLA shot dead Protestant civilian Samuel Rock at his home on Rosewood Street, Lower Oldpark, Belfast, claiming that he was a UDA member. Rock's family denied the claim. It was reported that Rock had recently purchased a car from a prominent loyalist in the Shankill area and the killing may thus have been a case of mistaken identity.
- 7 February: two INLA members were arrested trying to steal explosives from a quarry in Somerset, England for a new bombing campaign. They walked into a police ambush which was sprung prematurely when an INLA man stepped on a concealed police marksman. A third INLA volunteer escaped.
- 18 February: an INLA assassination attempt targeting a British Army Royal Irish Regiment (RIR) soldier was foiled by his mother, who blocked gunmen from entering their home in Frenchpark Street, south Belfast.
- 30 April: an INLA attack on a Protestant taxi-driver failed when the gun jammed in Botanic Avenue, Belfast. One man was arrested shortly afterwards.
- 17 May: the INLA fired several shots at Springfield Road RUC base, West Belfast.
- 15 June: the INLA fired several shots at a British security forces checkpoint at Millfield near Belfast city centre.
- 16 June: the INLA fired several shots at a vehicle checkpoint on Grosvenor Road, Belfast.
- 17 June: the INLA shot dead a retired RUC officer (John Patrick Murphy, 38) inside the York Hotel, Botanic Avenue, Belfast.
- 20 July: the INLA shot several times and seriously wounded a man at his home in Dunmurray, Belfast. The INLA claimed he was a British Army RIR soldier but this was denied by the RUC.
- 24 August: INLA members opened fire from a hijacked vehicle at Grosvenor Road RUC station, Belfast, injuring an RUC officer. Other RUC officers returned fire.
- 6 September: the INLA shot and injured a prominent UDA member sitting in his car outside his home in the Shankill area of Belfast.
- 20 September: the INLA fired several shots at the front sangar of New Barnsley RUC base, West Belfast.
- 7 October: the INLA claimed they fired shots at the British Army checkpoint at Coshquin on the outskirts of Derry using a "long-range weapon". The RUC did not record any shooting incident. The INLA later claimed to have carried out several sniper attacks on British security forces bases and checkpoints in Derry in this period.
- 8 October: the INLA claimed they fired shots at the British Army observation sangar on top of Broadway Tower, West Belfast.
- 12 October: the INLA fired several shots at a car entering Donegall Pass RUC station, Belfast. The RUC said two parked vehicles were struck but none injured.
- 18 October: a leading UDA member escaped from two INLA gunmen who entered his home in Suffolk, west Belfast. Before leaving they fired several shots above the heads of the man's family.
- 19 October: three INLA gunmen were arrested by the RUC near the Shankill Road area home of Johnny Adair, a senior member of the UDA/UFF.
- 6 December: three INLA members occupied a house and fired shots at Maghera RUC station, County Londonderry. Later a man was charged with INLA membership, weapons possession, and unlawful imprisonment.

=== 1994 ===
- 9 February: the INLA issued a statement announcing it was resuming its campaign following a two-month ceasefire, claiming the halt had been to show the group's desire for peace but that the Downing Street Declaration was inadequate.
- 10 February: Dominic McGlinchey, the INLA's former Chief of Staff, was shot dead in Drogheda. He had survived a previous assassination attempt in June 1993. He was shot 14 times with three shotguns and a pistol. The identity of the perpetrators remains unknown.
- 12 February: the INLA shot and injured a Protestant man in the loyalist Tigers Bay area. A brick was thrown through the window of his Bentinck Street house and several shots were fired.
- 24 February: The INLA shot dead a security guard (Jack Smyth) at the entrance to Bob Cratchits Bar, Lisburn Road, Belfast. The INLA claimed he was a member of a UDA/UFF unit responsible for rocket attacks against Republican targets in the city, but CAIN lists Smyth as a civilian.
- 27 April: the INLA shot dead a member of the UDA (Gerald Evans) at his fishing tackle shop, Northcott Shopping Centre, Ballyclare Road, Glengormley, County Antrim. Another man was also injured in the attack.
- 3 May: the INLA shot dead a civilian (Thomas Douglas) outside his workplace, Northern Ireland Electricity Headquarters, Stranmillis Road, Belfast. The INLA claimed he was a founder of Ulster Resistance and sat on the Combined Loyalist Military Command but CAIN lists Douglas as a civilian.
- 16 June: the INLA shot dead three UVF members (Trevor King, Colin Craig, David Hamilton) in a gun attack on Shankill Road, Belfast (See:1994 Shankill Road Killings).
- 8 July: INLA gunmen fired on a house in Shore Crescent in north Belfast after failing to gain entry. The INLA claimed a member of the security forces was their target, but it was reported the family had no connections with the security forces.
- 22 July: a leading member of the Dublin INLA (John Bolger) was killed by a former Belfast INLA gunman. This led to a dispute between the Belfast leadership and the Dublin wing ending with the entire Dublin organisation expelled.
- 18 August: INLA members were reportedly involved in the killing of Dublin crime boss Martin Cahill at his home in Rathmines. The INLA first claimed responsibility, before the IRA issued a statement and the INLA then retracted their claim. Gardaí believed there was still an INLA link, and retrospective reports assert John Gilligan hired the INLA.
- 23 September: the UVF tried to kill the INLA Chief of Staff, Hugh Torney in the Lower Falls area of Belfast. UVF gunmen held his family hostage but Torney failed to appear.

=== 1995 ===
- 5 April: four INLA members were arrested by Irish authorities on the main Dublin-Belfast road transporting pistols, assault rifles and about 2,000 rounds of ammunition to Northern Ireland.
- 1 December: the INLA shot and injured an alleged drug dealer on the Falls Road, west Belfast. The victim was a former INLA member who had been linked to numerous attacks in the early 1990s but had fallen out with the groups' leadership. An acquaintance, Paul Devine, was shot dead a week later by the IRA using their "Direct Action Against Drugs" cover name.

=== 1996 ===
- 30 January: the Hugh Torney lead INLA-GHQ faction shot dead the INLA Chief of staff Gino Gallagher, inside Department of Health and Social Services office on Falls Road, Belfast, in the course of an internal dispute.
- 5 March: an INLA-GHQ volunteer (John Fennell) was beaten to death by the INLA in Bundoran, County Donegal, in the course of an internal dispute.
- 15 March: the INLA shot dead a civilian (Barbara McAlorum, aged 9) by accident in Ashfield Gardens, Belfast; an INLA GHQ Staff relative was the intended target.
- 19 March: a man escaped injury in a shooting incident on the Whiterock Road, Belfast. INLA-GHQ faction claimed responsibility.
- 21 March: the INLA-GHQ faction tried to kill two men outside Royal Victoria Hospital, Belfast. Internal dispute.
- 22 March: the INLA released a statement referring to a "failure of the political process" and declared INLA units had been placed on standby to "operate from a position of defence and retaliation." The INLA never declared a ceasefire, but it had suspended attacks since the summer of 1994, shortly before the Provisional IRA's ceasefire.
- 13 April: an INLA member was shot and moderately wounded in West Belfast as part of an internal feud.
- 16 May: a bomb planted under a car in the visitors car park inside Maghaberry Prison was defused by the British Army. The car belonged to the father of Barbara McAlorum, shot dead in March. Internal dispute.
- 25 May: an INLA-GHQ volunteer (Dessie McCleery) was shot dead by INLA on Bankmore Street, Belfast, in the course of an internal dispute.
- 9 June: an INLA-GHQ volunteer (Francis Shannon) was shot dead by INLA in the Turf Lodge area of Belfast, in the course of an internal dispute.
- 12 July: three RUC officers were wounded in two separate gun attacks by the INLA during rioting over the Drumcree dispute. At approximately 1:40 AM two RUC officers were shot during disturbances in the Ardoyne area of Belfast. Around half an hour later an INLA member opened fire on a police vehicle on Duncairn Gardens. A bullet passed through one of the doors and hit a police officer inside on the arm. It was the first confirmed paramilitary action against British security forces since the IRA cease fire of 31 August 1994.
- 13 July: a former INLA volunteer (Dermot "Tonto" McShane) was crushed by a British army vehicle during a night of rioting.
- 13 July: several INLA gunmen, armed with AK-47 rifles, opened fire on the New Barnsley police station in West Belfast. There were two attacks, about three hours apart, in which allegedly "hundreds of rounds" were fired. RUC officers returned fire with tracers and flares. A witness described it as the most intense gun battle at the base since the 1980s.
- 19 July: several INLA bomb alerts caused significant disruption in Lisburn.
- 27 July: a female caller, claiming to be from the INLA, warned a newspaper that devices had been left in the Woodbourne and Oldpark areas of Belfast. Security forces found a suspect device under a car in Woodbourne and another in Oldpark.
- 16 August: an INLA member was shot and seriously wounded in an ambush in West Belfast. Part of an internal feud.
- 3 September: INLA-GHQ Staff leader Hugh Torney was shot dead by INLA volunteers in Lurgan, in the course of an internal dispute.

=== 1997 ===
- 17 March: an INLA plan to kill Billy Hutchinson, member of the Progressive Unionist Party (PUP), and former UVF volunteer, as he left a radio interview on Ormeau Avenue, Belfast, was foiled by security forces. The attempt followed an INLA threat to avenge the murder of a Catholic man, John Slane, who was shot by unknown Loyalists three days earlier.
- 28 April: INLA prisoners at Maghaberry Prison held a prison officer hostage at gunpoint with a 9mm pistol and a Zip Gun before giving themselves up. The prisoners were protesting at the transfer of Billy Wright, then leader of the Loyalist Volunteer Force (LVF), from Maghaberry to the Maze Prison.
- 9 May: the INLA shot dead an off-duty RUC officer (Darren Bradshaw) as he drank with friends in the Parliament Bar, frequented by members of Belfast's gay community.
- 1 June: several rifle rounds were fired at New Barnsley joint British Army-RUC base in West Belfast. The IRA or INLA were believed to be responsible.
- 4 June: an INLA volunteer (John Morris) was shot dead by the Gardaí during an armed robbery in Inchicore, Dublin.
- 7 July: INLA gunmen fired on British soldiers in Ardoyne, Belfast as part of the widespread violence that followed Secretary of State for Northern Ireland Mo Mowlam's decision over the Drumcree parade. See: 1997 nationalist riots in Northern Ireland.
- 7 July: the INLA carried out gun attacks on British security forces in West Belfast.
- 8 July: the INLA claimed responsibility for several gun and grenade attacks across Northern Ireland in the preceding days and threatened to attack Orangemen whom it viewed as responsible for forcing parades through Nationalist areas. Earlier RUC intelligence reports warned that an INLA cell based in the Markets area of Belfast had been ordered to open fire on a contentious Orange Order parade as it passed along the Lower Ormeau.
- 11 July: INLA gunmen fired across a peaceline, injuring two Protestant teenagers at an Eleventh Night bonfire in North Belfast. One of the youths, a 14-year-old schoolboy, underwent emergency surgery.
- 10 August: the INLA staged a show of force involving armed members posing with weapons for a cameraman in west Belfast, timed to coincide with a Sinn Féin rally. The INLA later released a statement that called the recent IRA ceasefire "bogus"
- 16 September: INLA members were believed to have transported a 400 lb (180 kg) van bomb constructed by the Continuity IRA which exploded outside the RUC base in Markethill, County Armagh. It was timed to coincide with Sinn Féin entering ongoing political talks.
- 18 September: a grenade thrown by the INLA was defused by army technical experts outside of a police station in the Creggan area of Derry.
- 19 September: the INLA claimed responsibility for a grenade attack against an RUC base in Strabane, County Tyrone.
- 25 September: the INLA lobbed a grenade at Willowfield RUC Station on the Woodstock Road in east Belfast. It failed to explode.
- 25 September: the INLA lobbed a grenade at Ballynafeigh RUC Station on the Ormeau Road in south Belfast. It failed to explode.
- 15 October: an INLA attack was reportedly foiled by the RUC after they intercepted suspected INLA members in a car with an AK-47 rifle and pistol on the Andersonstown Road, Belfast.
- 27 December: INLA prisoners shot dead Loyalist Volunteer Force (LVF) leader and fellow prisoner Billy Wright inside Maze Prison.

=== 1998 ===
- 1 January: a Protestant family's home in Newtownbutler, County Fermanagh, was sprayed with gunfire. The INLA claimed responsibility in a call to a radio station, although no verified codeword was provided. The Fermanagh Brigade of the INLA emerged the previous summer, releasing several statements threatening to intervene during disputed Loyalist marches in Newtownbutler. However, the INLA and IRSP had previously dismissed the "Fermanagh Brigade" as a hoax and threatened those using the groups' name "without authorisation."
- 19 January: the INLA shot dead UDA leader Jim Guiney at his carpet shop in Dunmurry.
- 28 February: the INLA detonated an explosive device after luring RUC officers to Hazelwood Integrated College, Belfast. Two RUC officers and two civilians were treated for shock afterwards.
- 27 March: the INLA shot dead a former RUC officer (Cyril Stewart) outside a supermarket, off Dobbin Street Lane, Armagh.
- 1 April: INLA members escaped an RUC ambush while retrieving a weapons cache at a house in Woodburn Crescent in Dungannon, County Tyrone. The homeowner, who had INLA links, arrived later and was arrested.
- 8 April: the INLA shot dead an ex-member of the UVF (Trevor Deeney) outside his home, Hillhampton, off Rossdowney Road, Kilfennan, Derry. Deeney had recently delivered statements to journalists on behalf of the LVF, and his brother was an LVF member imprisoned for carrying out the Greysteel massacre. The INLA claimed he was also a member of the organisation.
- 9 April: the INLA was believed to be responsible for death threats targeting senior Unionist politicians David Trimble and John Taylor.
- 17 April: the INLA shot dead a former INLA volunteer and taxi driver (Mark McNeill) while he was getting out of his car, outside taxi depot, Shaws Road, Andersonstown, Belfast.
- 12 May: the INLA claimed responsibility for a 40 lb (18 kg) landmine abandoned on Whiterock Road, Belfast. It was found and defused by the British Army after a 24-hour security operation.
- 25 May: security forces sources reported that the INLA attempted to kill a leading UVF figure in Belfast, two weeks previously.
- June: senior UDA/UFF member Johnny Adair, then a prisoner in the Maze, was warned by the RUC that the INLA intended to assassinate him. Allegedly according to INLA sources the group had smuggled a quantity of strychnine into the prison as part of one abortive plot to poison a bodybuilding drink in the hope Adair would drink it.
- 15 June: the INLA was blamed for firebomb attacks which destroyed a cricket club and a row of shops in Downpatrick, County Down.
- 24 June: the INLA claimed responsibility for a 200 lb (91 kg) car bomb that exploded in the centre of Newtownhamilton, County Armagh. The group had issued a 50-minute warning but it denoted before the area was cleared; six people were injured. The Real IRA (RIRA) provided the Semtex explosives and CAIN lists them as the perpetrators.
- 10 July: INLA members were reported to be involved in a RIRA operation targeting London's transport system and commercial premises that was foiled following the arrest of several suspected activists in Ireland and England. Police in London retrieved a cache of incendiary devices and a small Semtex bomb.
- 13 July: two suspect packages were left at Ballynafeigh Orange Hall in South Belfast. The British Army carried out controlled explosions. The INLA was believed to have been responsible.
- 17 August: the IRSP, the INLA's political wing, issued a statement after the Omagh bombing calling on the INLA to end their armed struggle.
- 22 August: after a 24-year campaign, the INLA declared a ceasefire.
- 23 August: Christopher "Crip" McWilliams, then OC of the Irish National Liberation Army in the Maze Prison, declared that the "war is over".

=== 1999 ===
- 8 August: the INLA declared the "war is over" but said it would not decommission its weapons.
- 10 October: INLA volunteer Patrick Campbell was killed in a confrontation with a criminal gang in Dublin. The event dubbed the "Ballymount Bloodbath" saw the INLA tie up and torture a criminal gang before associates of the gang entered armed with machetes to free them. Campbell was stabbed and bled to death.

== 2000s–2010s ==
=== 2000 ===
- 29 April: the INLA shot dead Patrick Neville on a stairway in a block of flats, near to his home, St. Michael's estate, Inchicore, Dublin. The INLA claimed he was part of the gang responsible for killing Patrick Campbell in October 1999.

=== 2001 ===
- October: the INLA tried to assassinate a man with an under-car bomb in Dublin, but the device failed to explode properly. The INLA succeeded in killing the intended victim (Ronnie Draper) in June 2003; they believed he had been involved in the killing of Patrick Campbell in October 1999.
- 29 October: INLA members were blamed by police for shooting dead a former loyalist prisoner (Charles Christopher Folliard) in Strabane, County Tyrone.
- 12 December: an ex-INLA member from Dublin (Derek Lenehan) died several hours after being found shot in the legs by the INLA at the side of New Road, near Forkhill, County Armagh. It was believed that he had been shot because of an internal INLA dispute .

=== 2002 ===
- 12 January: the PSNI discovered explosives and weapons during the search of a house in north Belfast. The haul included 4 blast bombs, an anti-personnel mine containing high explosive, two detonators, a sub-machine gun, ammunition, and a shotgun. They were believed to have belonged to the INLA. Afterwards a man was arrested.
- 22 July: the INLA shot and injured a young Protestant man in the Ardoyne area of Belfast.
- 15 October: the INLA claimed responsibility for the punishment shooting of a man in Strabane, County Tyrone. In a statement issued six days later the INLA claimed the man been engaged in a campaign of smears, intimidation, and arson against IRSP members.

=== 2003 ===
- 14 June: the INLA shot dead Ronnie Draper outside a pub where he worked as a doorman at Eden Quay, allegedly as revenge for the killing of Patrick Campbell in October 1999.
- 14 November: an "elaborate" INLA hoax bomb was discovered under the car of Dublin journalist Paul Williams.

=== 2004 ===
- 3 June: the INLA shot dead a former INLA member (Kevin McAlorum) outside a primary school in Derriaghy on the outskirts of Belfast. He was allegedly responsible for the murder of INLA Chief of Staff Gino Gallagher in 1996.

=== 2007 ===
- 3 June: the INLA claimed responsibility for the shooting death of a doorman/bouncer and drug dealer, Brian McGlynn, in Derry. However, it was reported that "[D]espite the INLA's claim, some security and republican sources continue to suspect the Provisional IRA had a role in the murder. They said McGlynn's behaviour had upset the Provisional IRA in recent weeks."

=== 2008 ===
- 30 June: the INLA performed a full-scale paramilitary funeral for former INLA volunteer Christopher "Crip" McWilliams. They also attacked Martin McGuinness saying "We have a message for the British micro minister and macro hypocrite Martin McGuinness -- we are not going away."
- 25 March: the INLA was blamed for a pipe bomb taped to the side of a car in the Brathwaite Street flats complex in Pimlico, Dublin. The device neutralised in a controlled explosion by the Irish Army. It was one of several Dublin pipe bomb attacks, linked to criminal feuds, which the INLA was suspected of being involved in that year.

=== 2009 ===
- 15 February: the INLA shot dead an alleged drug dealer, Jim McConnell, in Derry.
- 19 August: the INLA shot and wounded a man in Derry. The INLA claimed that the man was involved in drug dealing although the injured man and his family denied the allegation. However, in a newspaper article on 28 August the victim retracted his previous statement and admitted he had been involved in small scale drug-dealing but had since ceased these activities.
- 11 October: speaking at the graveside of Seamus Costello in Bray, the INLA formally announced an end to its armed campaign, stating that the current situation allows it pursue its goals through peaceful political means.

=== 2010 ===
- 8 February: it was announced that the INLA had put its weapons out of commission.
- 10 June: the INLA shot and seriously injured a man in the Oldpark area of north Belfast.

=== 2013 ===
- 21 March: Sinn Féin blamed elements close to the INLA for shooting two men in the legs in Derry, and urged those close to the INLA to pass on any information they have.

=== 2015 ===
- 9 February: INLA members were suspected of being responsible for several under-car bombs across Belfast. One device went off destroying a car on St James's Road while two others in North and South Belfast failed to detonate. It was suggested that the bombs were part of a "drugs turf war".
- 18 July: a large-scale paramilitary display was organised by the INLA at the funeral in Derry of Peggy O'Hara, the mother of 1981 hunger striker Patsy O’Hara. Shots were fired over her coffin.
- 4 November: a paramilitary display by the INLA took place at the funeral of Declan McGlinchey, son of former INLA leader, Dominic McGlinchey, who was shot dead in Drogheda in 1994.

=== 2018 ===
- 4 December: Jim Donegan was murdered as he sat in his car outside a school on the Glen Road in west Belfast. The PSNI said the INLA and ONH were involved.

=== 2022 ===
- 30 August: the INLA fired several shots at the home of a member they accused of being a police informer in the Ballymagroarty area of Derry. There were no injuries. The man had been arrested in connection with an INLA show of strength earlier that year. Several other former members of the movement in Derry were also reportedly under threat.

== See also ==
- List of weapons used by the Irish National Liberation Army
