= Carna =

Carna may refer to:

== Places ==
- Cârna, a commune in Dolj County, Romania
- Càrna, an island in Loch Sunart on the west coast of Scotland
- Carna, County Galway, a village in Connemara in the west of Ireland

== Other ==
- an ancient Roman deity whose identity became confused with Cardea
- Carna Botnet, hijacked insecure devices online used to map IPv4 in 2012
