= Newry (disambiguation) =

Newry is the fourth largest city in Northern Ireland.

Newry may also refer to:

== Places ==
=== Australia ===
- Newry, Victoria
- Newry Islands National Park, Queensland
- Newry Station, Northern Territory cattle station

=== Canada ===
- Newry, Ontario

=== United States ===
- Newry, Indiana
- Newry, Maine
- Newry, Pennsylvania
- Newry, South Carolina
- Newry Township, Minnesota
- Newry, Wisconsin

== Other uses related to Northern Ireland ==
=== Northern Ireland constituencies ===
- Newry (Parliament of Ireland constituency)
- Newry (UK Parliament constituency), former constituency
- Newry and Armagh (Assembly constituency)
- Newry and Armagh (UK Parliament constituency)

== Other uses ==
- Viscount Newry, hereditary title first awarded in 1822 to Francis Needham, 1st Earl of Kilmorey
- Newry (civil parish)
- Newry Canal
- Newry Bosco GFC
- Newry City F.C.
- Newry High School
- Newry River
- Newry and Mourne District Council
- Newry railway station
- The Troubles in Newry, a timeline of incidents
