= Jackie McClelland =

Irish firefighter (1923–1981)

John Stephen McClelland BEM
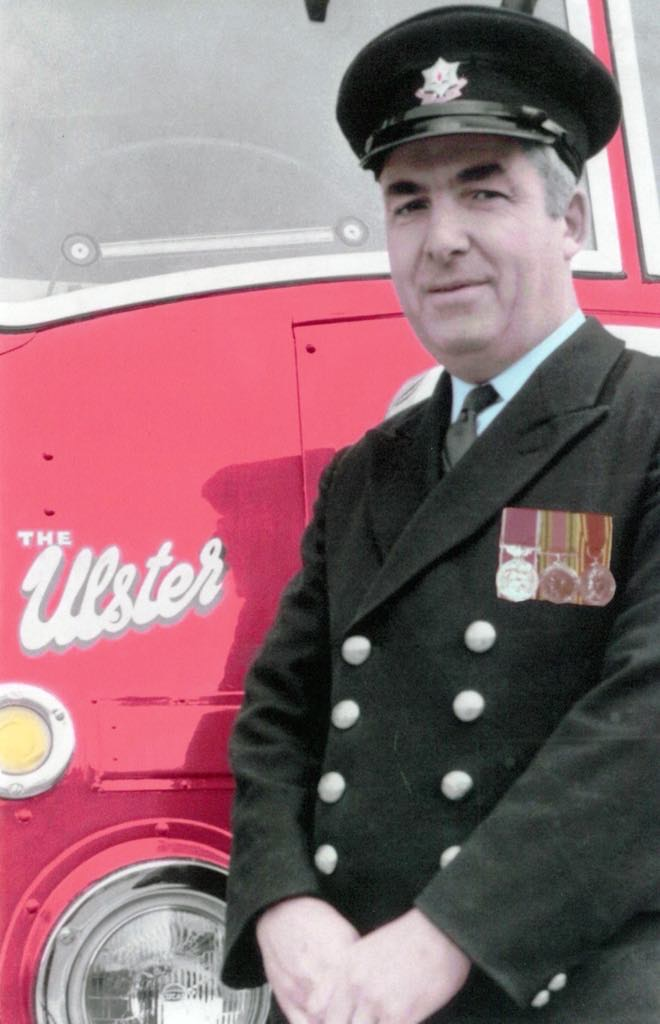
- Born: John Stephen McClelland; 14 October 1923; Newry, Northern Ireland, United Kingdom
- Died: 13 April 1981 (aged 57); Newry
- Other names: Jackie, Jack
- Occupation: Firefighter
- Known for: Honorary Fire Chief of Newry
- Title: Section Leader / Sub Officer
- Predecessor: Christy Hughes
- Successor: John McParland

John "Jackie" Stephen McClelland BEM (14 October 1923 – 13 April 1981) was a Firefighter and Councillor from Newry, Northern Ireland who served for over 30 years. He retired due to injuries sustained in the aftermath of a bomb explosion while on duty.

He was the father of five firefighters. One of which being former Chief Fire Officer of the Northern Ireland Fire Brigade, John McClelland.

== Early life ==
McClelland grew up in St Patrick's Avenue, Newry. He is the son of Patrick Joseph McClelland and Kate Trainor. He married Newry-born Ave Cochrane in 1948.

His father was a World War I veteran who had served for around 20 years as a professional soldier and farrier, primarily with the Royal Irish Rifles. He saw service in India and later on the Western Front, including at the Battle of Neuve Chapelle and the Battle of the Somme.

McClelland came from a working class family and recalled relying on relief from the poor law guardians. Jackie’s first job was a weaver at Bessbrook mill.

== Firefighting career ==
At the outbreak of World War 2 he and his older brother Jimmy were living with relatives in Birmingham, England, where they worked at a BSA factory. McClelland's father was employed as a munitions officer and the factory had its own fire brigade; the brothers volunteered and were dispatched to incidents across Birmingham and nearby Coventry during the Birmingham Blitz and Coventry Blitz.

A year later, upon returning to Northern Ireland, McClelland began working on the construction of the Cranfield Aerodrome. He then joined the Auxiliary Fire Service as a wholetime firefighter (Note: In Firefighting, the term "wholetime" is a Full-time professional who responds to emergency calls from a fire station.) in Newry but was transferred to Belfast. It later rebranded to the National Fire Service. He was stationed at Chichester Street station and responded to the Belfast Blitz. He received the wartime Defence Medal for these contributions.

When the National Fire Service was disbanded in 1948, he returned to his hometown station, Newry, which was now under the control of the Southern Fire Authority, and was later consolidated into the Northern Ireland Fire Authority in 1950. He joined as a retained firefighter (Note: In Firefighting, the term "retained" (also known as an on-call firefighter) is a part-time professional who responds to emergency calls from home or work using a pager or other means of being alerted.) and received mentorship from Christy Hughes and notable firefighting figure, James Heather.

Aside from his retrained duties, McClelland also worked as a foreman of the a textile plant located at the Greenbank industrial estate from 1960 and was promoted to Shift Supervisor when US company of Ulster Textiles took over. The plant closed 10 years later. He was later employed as a security officer at Derramore Knitewear factory and despatch supervisor at Osborne Electronics. He was undertaking a course in engineering at the Government training centre at the time of his injury.

In 1966 he replaced Christy Hughes as Section Leader, also known as Sub Officer, although McClelland would go on to earn the moniker "Fire Chief of Newry", an honorary title.

=== During the Troubles ===
In 1969 McClelland oversaw a busy provincial town fire station. When civil unrest broke out following the Northern Ireland civil rights movement in reaction to long-standing political division.

In 1971, following Internment (Note: In Northern Ireland, the term "Internment" refers to a type of collective punishment where civilians where imprisoned without trial.) An escalation of the violence saw the first fatalities of the period. Newry would burn from riots, mortar strikes and a bombing campaign during the Troubles in Newry.

In one week that year the situation deteriorated to the point firemen where described as being on "virtually constant alert" with the retained firemen under McClelland's leadership taking up voluntary residency on station. Newry was described as an "Inferno" and being "aflame from end to end".

Over a period of four days, 10–14 August, over 40 fires where reported with the number rising to 68 by the end of the week. Despite objections from McClelland and his men, he was ordered to stand down his men by a commanding officer and staff brought in from surrounding areas—to relieve his crew.

Later that year, during an IRA ambush at the junction of Omeath and Drumalane Road, a 20-pound bomb struck a fire appliance, which his eldest son Joe was riding on. Three of the crew received treatment in hospital whilst the fire appliance was destroyed.

In 1972, McClelland attended the aftermath of the Newry customs bombing, which he described as his worst experience as a firefighter: "Firemen had the chilling task of picking up pieces of flesh, and portions of human bodies, putting them into plastic bags".

Also in 1972, Section Leader McClelland was awarded the British Empire Medal for gallantry by Queen Elizabeth II cited "For his courage, leadership, and devotion to duty," and "despite personal injury amid violence, refusing to allow it to define the response of duty."

McClelland received letters of congratulations, most notably from the Queen herself, the Fire Brigades Union and the London Fire Brigade. He was cited as saying on the front page of the Newry Reporter that the medal was not merely for him but dedicated it to all those that served beside him.

A year later, on the 26th of October 1973, McClelland was severely injured on duty whilst attending a call-out in Newtownhamilton when a bomb exploded in O'Malley's furniture store. He lost fingers from both hands, several feet of intestine and sustained holes in his bladder. Some debris also got embedded into his leg. A priest having arrived on scene administered the last rites. He was forced to withdraw from active duty, and after two years of rehabilitation had left the organisation completely in 1975.

=== Retirement ===
In 1975, McClelland stated that "he did not regret one day of his 35 year career and believed it is an honour and privilege to represent the fire service."

In 1977, during the centenary celebrating 100 years of firefighting in the Newry area, it was McClelland who suggested that the new park that was being developed at the time at Gallows Hill be named Heather Park, after his former mentor James Heather.

In 1979 he visited New York and met the Commissioner of the New York City Fire Department, Augustus A. Beekman. As a representative of the Northern Ireland Fire Authority, he presented a plaque sent over by Chief Fire Officer, George Morrison. The Commissioner issued a commemorative medal to McClelland in acknowledgement of his career.

=== Honours and legacy ===
In 1965, McClelland received the 25-year Long Service and Good Conduct Medal.

After his retirement, a trophy named the McClelland Perpetual Trophy was awarded to the best kept and most efficient station in the Newry and Mourne area with Rathfriland first receiving the award in 1976 and later Warrenpoint in 1977. The Ave McClelland Perpetual Trophy was handed out to the best cadet in Newry following the death of McClelland's wife as late as 2003.

McClelland was known as a 'Man of Courage' and in 1981 described as a 'Warrior of Peace'.

In the 1990s, Dennison Commercials, a local car dealer that sold and maintained the Volvo appliances for the Newry Fire Station commissioned a local artist, Cora Harrington, to paint a set of 3 paintings to be displayed in the new soon-to-be-opened fire station. They represent the different eras of firefighting in the Newry and Mourne area. Sub Officer McClelland is depicted commanding a blaze in the picture entitled "Troubled Times," using a reference from an older photo.

Words written by McClelland form part of the “Last Alarm” ceremony used at some firefighter funerals in Northern Ireland. In the ceremony a representative of the fire service reads a citation about the deceased firefighter’s career; the reading is followed by the sounding of a bell.

In 2002, a park in Newry on Edward Street was developed on the location of the defunct Royal Ulster Constabulary base at Corry Square. "McClelland Park" was named after the former honorary Fire Chief, on the site of the 1985 Newry mortar attack.

== Personal life ==
McClelland joined the Alliance Party in 1975 as a councillor, and was re-elected in 1977. He was Chairman of the Finance and General Purposes Committee. He sat on all standing committees as well as sub-committees dealing with gas, town halls, communications, and road safety.

McClelland was a lifelong Newry Town fan and served as a committee member in the 1960s. In the 1970s, he was President of Yewry Archers and subsequently the McClelland archery tophy was named after him.

McClelland was a Trade Unionist and member of the Fire Brigades Union since 1944. He was life a long member of the Irish National Foresters. He served as Chairman of Newry Samaritans until he had to withdraw due to his illness.

The McClelland family has a collective history of 320 years of firefighting service. Some of the family members include: his brother Jimmy, his five sons Joe, John, Marcus, Raymond and Stephen, his cousin Paddy McClelland, uncles Mickey Linnie and Robert Campbell, and grandsons Kieran and Colum McClelland. McClelland's 6th son, James is the brother in law of mountaineer and firefighter, Terence 'Banjo' Bannon. He was related to First Officer Alexander McClelland, one of the original volunteers and a founder of the Municipal Fire Service in Newry in 1877.

McClelland died on 13 April 1981 from a combination of Intestinal cancer and complications exacerbating from his earlier injury. He was 57. He is buried at St Mary’s Graveyard, Newry.
