= John McClelland =

John McClelland may refer to:

- John McClelland (doctor) (1805–1883), British medical doctor and naturalist
- John McClelland (footballer, born 1935) (1935–2024), English football outside-right
- John McClelland (footballer, born 1955), Northern Ireland international football defender
- John McClelland (businessman), former Chairman of Rangers F.C.
- John McClelland (soldier) (1766–1849), officer in the War of 1812, son of John B. McClelland
- John A. McClelland, Irish physics professor
- John B. McClelland (1734–1782), American Revolutionary War soldier from Pennsylvania
- John Carman McClelland (1951–2022), former politician in Ontario, Canada
- John McClelland (Firefighter) (1923–1981), Honuary Fire Chief of Newry, Northern Ireland.
- John McClelland (Firefighter) (1951–2022), Chief Fire Officer of Northern Ireland.

== See also ==
- John McClellan (disambiguation)
- John McLellan (disambiguation)
