= Our Lady's Grammar School =

Our Lady's Grammar School, Newry

Location
- Chequer Hill, Newry BT35 6DY; Northern Ireland
- Coordinates: 54.1808°N 6.3418°W

Information
- Type: Grammar
- Motto: Ora et Labora ("Pray and Work")
- Religious affiliation: Roman Catholic
- Established: 1887
- Local authority: Education Authority (Southern)
- Principal: Fiona McAlinden
- Gender: Female
- Age: 11 to 18
- Enrolment: 965
- Colour
- Website: www.ourladysgrammar.co.uk

Our Lady's Grammar School is a girls' grammar school in Newry, Northern Ireland. It is at Chequer Hill, on the County Armagh side of the Newry River.

== History ==
Our Lady's was founded by the Sisters of Mercy. It first opened its doors on 21 November 1887, with only nine pupils. Initially lessons took place in a room in the Mercy Convent, but by 1894 the school was located in a four-storey house in Canal Street, Newry. The numbers of boarders and day-pupils gradually increased and the school expanded over a large site between Canal Street and Catherine Street. By the early 1980s there were 660 pupils and a new school building was in urgent need. The new building was opened at Chequer Hill in 1992. The school currently has an enrolment of about 930.

In 2017 Arlene Foster the leader of the DUP visited the school at which she expressed being ‘uplifted’ after meeting pupils studying the Irish language.

In November 2019, a new Technology block, the Mercy Building, opened. This is a standalone facility consisting of a five-room Technology and Design Suite, four general classrooms and lunchtime facilities for Lower Sixth.

In October 2019, the previous Technology facilities were demolished, and work began on a new ICT building which opened in April 2021. The Russell building houses two state of the art ICT suites and a Sixth Form ICT room. The Emmanuel study and two further general classrooms are on the ground floor of the facility.

== Academics ==
Our Lady's Grammar School has a long tradition of high performance in academics. In 2019 100% of its entrants received five or more GCSEs at grades A* to C, including the core subjects of English and Maths.

86.1% of its students who sat the A-level exams in 2018/19 were awarded three A*-C grades.

== Notable alumni ==
- Carmel Hanna (b. 1946) - politician
