= John McClelland (fire fighter) =

Firefighter

John Eamon McClelland FISM FIFireE
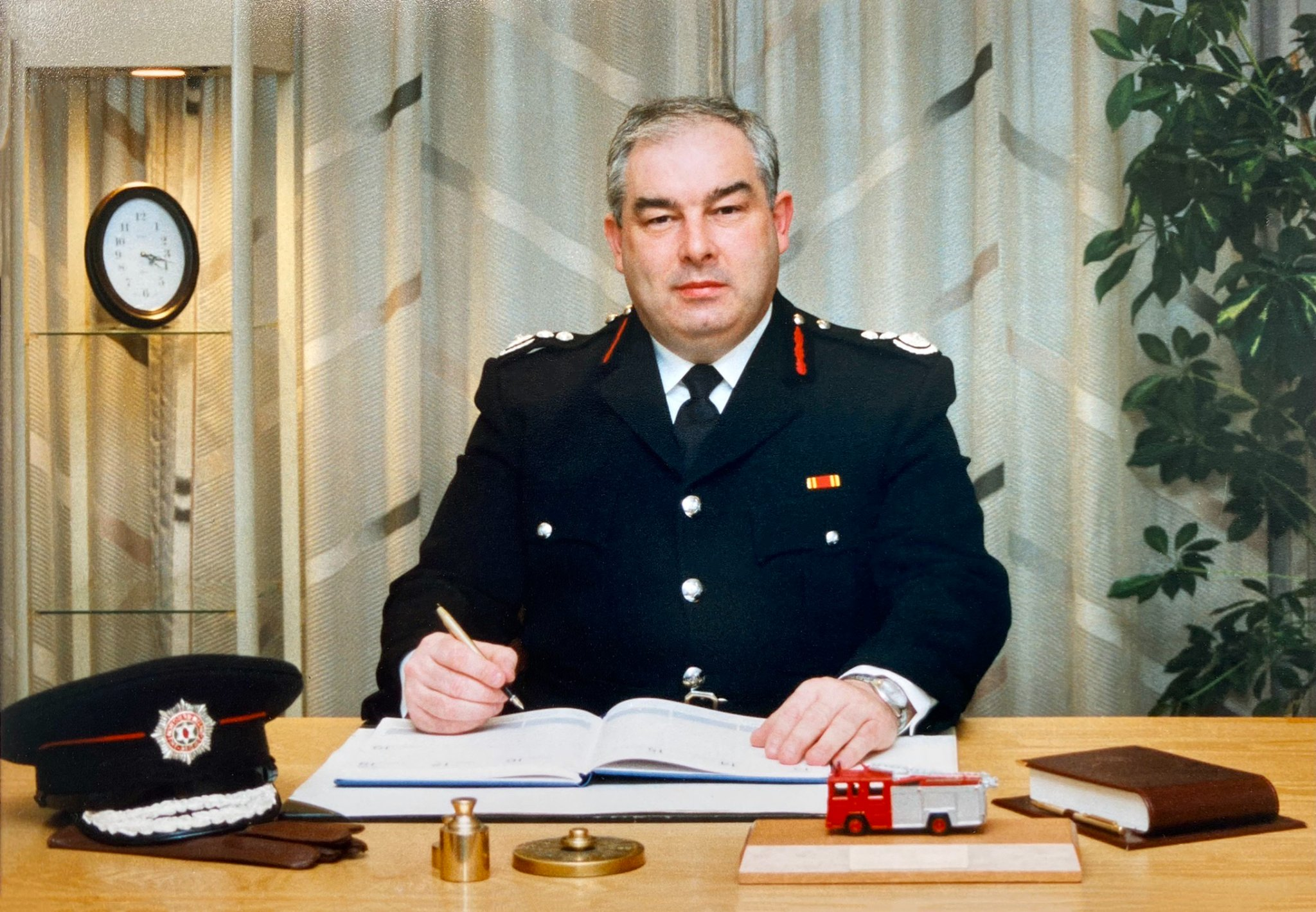
- John McClelland in office
- Born: John Eamon McClelland; June 6, 1951; Newry, Northern Ireland, United Kingdom
- Died: November 6, 2022 (aged 71); Newry
- Resting place: St Mary's Church, Newry
- Occupations: Firefighter; lecturer; deacon
- Title: Chief Fire Officer
- Term: 1996-2002

John Eamon McClelland (6 June 1951 - 6 November 2022) was a firefighter from Newry, Northern Ireland who served in the fire service for over 30 years. He was Chief Executive and Chief Fire Officer of the Northern Ireland Fire Brigade. He is the son of firefighter, Jackie McClelland.

== Early life ==
McClelland was the second of six children of Jackie McClelland and Eva McClelland (née Cochrane). His siblings included Joe, James, Marcus, Stephen and Raymond. He grew up in St Patrick's Avenue, and attended St. Colman's Abbey Primary School and the Abbey Christian Brothers' Grammar School.

McClelland received a Master of Business Administration and B.A Degree in public sector administration from the University of Ulster, and a post graduate diploma in management studies which he received with commendation. He also graduated from the Institution of Fire Engineers with the highest grade of 'Fellow' which allows the use of the post-nominal, FIFireE. He was also a Fellow of the Institute of Supervisory Management FISM.

In 1998 he received the award Distinguished graduate of the year award in recognition of "his professional achievements and contribution to social and community life in Northern Ireland."

== Career ==
In 1968, McClelland became a firefighter, following in the footsteps of his father and his older brother; three of his younger brothers would later follow. He joined in Newry as part of the Northern Ireland Fire Authority, as a retained firefighter. (Note: In Firefighting, the term "retained" (also known as an on-call firefighter) is a part-time professional who responds to emergency calls from home or work using a pager or other means of being alerted. Both retained and wholetime are trained to the same standard.) In 1969, he became a wholetime firefighter (Note: In Firefighting, the term "wholetime" is a full-time professional who responds to emergency calls from a fire station.) based at the control centre in Lisburn. In the early 1970s he was promoted to Sub-Officer and worked as an instructor at the Fire Brigade Training School. He later served in Derry as a Company Officer.

In 1978 he was promoted to Station Officer and posted to Cadogan Station in Belfast. He was subsequently promoted to District Officer for the Antrim, Ballyclare and Crumlin areas. In 1987 he became Assistant Divisional Officer in Omagh and was later appointed Divisional Officer for 'A Division' in Belfast.

In 1989 he was appointed the brigade’s Project Development Officer, overseeing the development of a new training school in Lisburn. He was involved in the design of several fire appliances and new fire stations, including those at Newry and Glengormley. In 1990 he became Head Of Brigade Training, and 1991 he attended the UK Brigade Command Course at the Fire Service College, in Moreton-in-Marsh.

In 1995 he was promoted to Deputy Chief Fire Officer. He attended the opening of the new wholetime fire station in Newry. Following the death of Stephen Walker, McClelland became temporary Acting Chief Fire Officer; the appointment was later made permanent.

=== Chief Fire Officer ===
McClelland served as Chief Executive and Chief Fire Officer from 1996 until his retirement in 2002. During his tenure he introduced several initiatives. In 1999, he introduced the "Opportunity 2000" programme aimed at attracting more women into the fire service. Also in 1999, two arson-detection dogs (Storm and Ben) were trained with support from Zurich Financial Services to detect accelerants used to start fires. In 2000 a fire-safety education package, “Safety Crew”, was introduced for children aged 8 and 9 in primary schools across Northern Ireland; it was launched with assistance from UTV presenter Frank Mitchell.

In June 2001, McClelland appeared before the Northern Ireland Assembly's Public Accounts Committee in connection with its examination of the Fire Authority for Northern Ireland's fleet management and financial administration between 1998 and 2000. He defended a number of the Authority's practices by citing operational requirements, firefighter morale, and the difficulties associated with implementing new equipment and information systems. He also acknowledged shortcomings in areas including vehicle record-keeping, procurement, workshop efficiency, credit-card controls, and sickness absence, and he outlined measures intended to address them.

In July 2001 he received, on behalf of the organisation, an illuminated scroll from the Northern Ireland Assembly recognising the sacrifice and commitment of fire-service members during the Troubles. The award followed a unanimous Assembly vote in November 2000 and was presented by the Speaker, Lord Alderdice, at Parliament Buildings on 17 July 2001.

In September 2001 a collection was organised for the families of firefighters killed in the September 11 attacks in New York.

McClelland was involved in the selection of senior officers for the UK Brigade Command Course.

In 2002 he attended the opening of McClelland Park in Newry, named after his father.

=== Honours and legacy ===
John McClelland is part of the McClelland firefighting family which has a collective history of 320 years of firefighting service. Some of the family members include: his father Jackie, four brothers, Joe, Marcus, Raymond and Stephen, his uncle Jimmy McClelland, his cousin Paddy McClelland, his two great uncles Mickey Linnie and Robert Campbell, and nephews Kieran and Colum McClelland. McClelland's brother, James is the brother in law of mountaineer and firefighter, Terence 'Banjo' Bannon. He was related to First Officer Alexander McClelland, one of the original volunteers and a founder of the Municipal Fire Service in Newry in 1877.

Words attributed to McClelland, inspired by a remark of his father, form part of the “Last Alarm” ceremony used at firefighter funerals in Northern Ireland, where a fire service spokesperson attends the requiem mass, reads a citation recognizing the firefighter's career, and ends the ceremony by the sounding of a bell.

== Personal life ==
Upon retirement, McClelland took up a full-time position as a tutor to the UK Brigade Command Course at the Fire Service College. He served a term as President of St John Ambulance, and was on the chair of governors for St Mary's High School. In 2017 he was ordained and became the first permanent Deacon in Newry.

McClelland died on 6 November 2022 and is buried in St Marys graveyard, Newry.
