= Newry =

City in Northern Ireland

Coordinates: 54.176°N 6.349°W

Newry: Irish: Iúr Cinn Trá/An tIúr; Scots: Newrie
- City
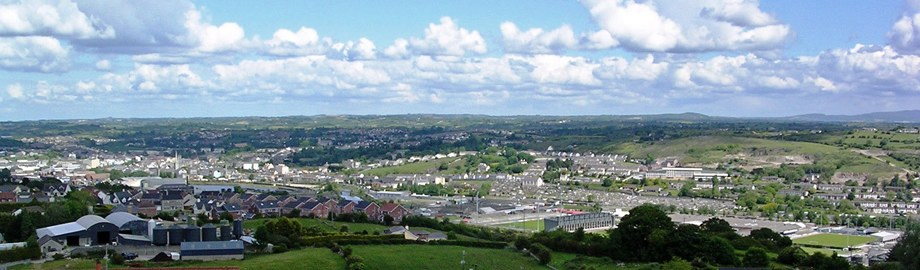
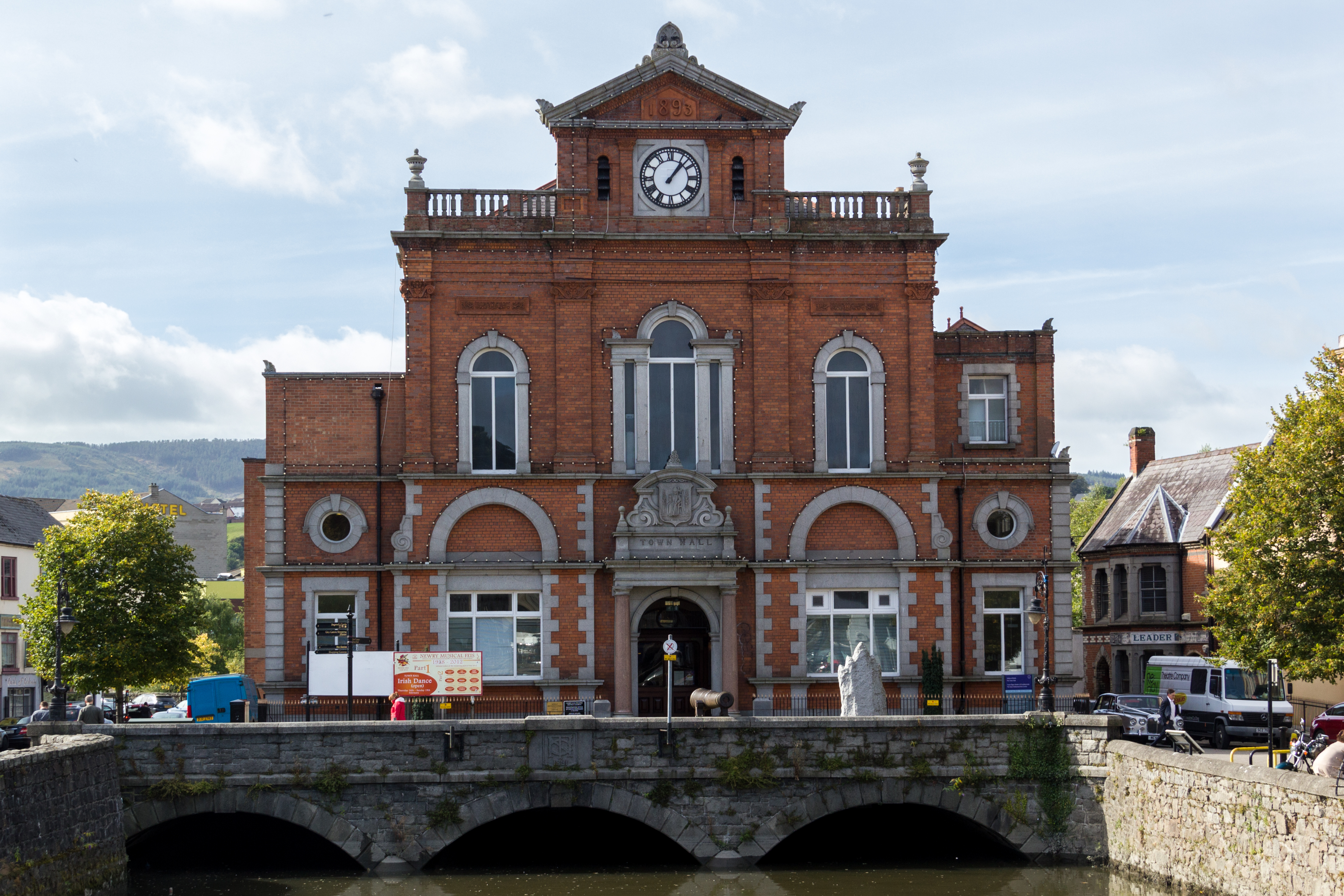
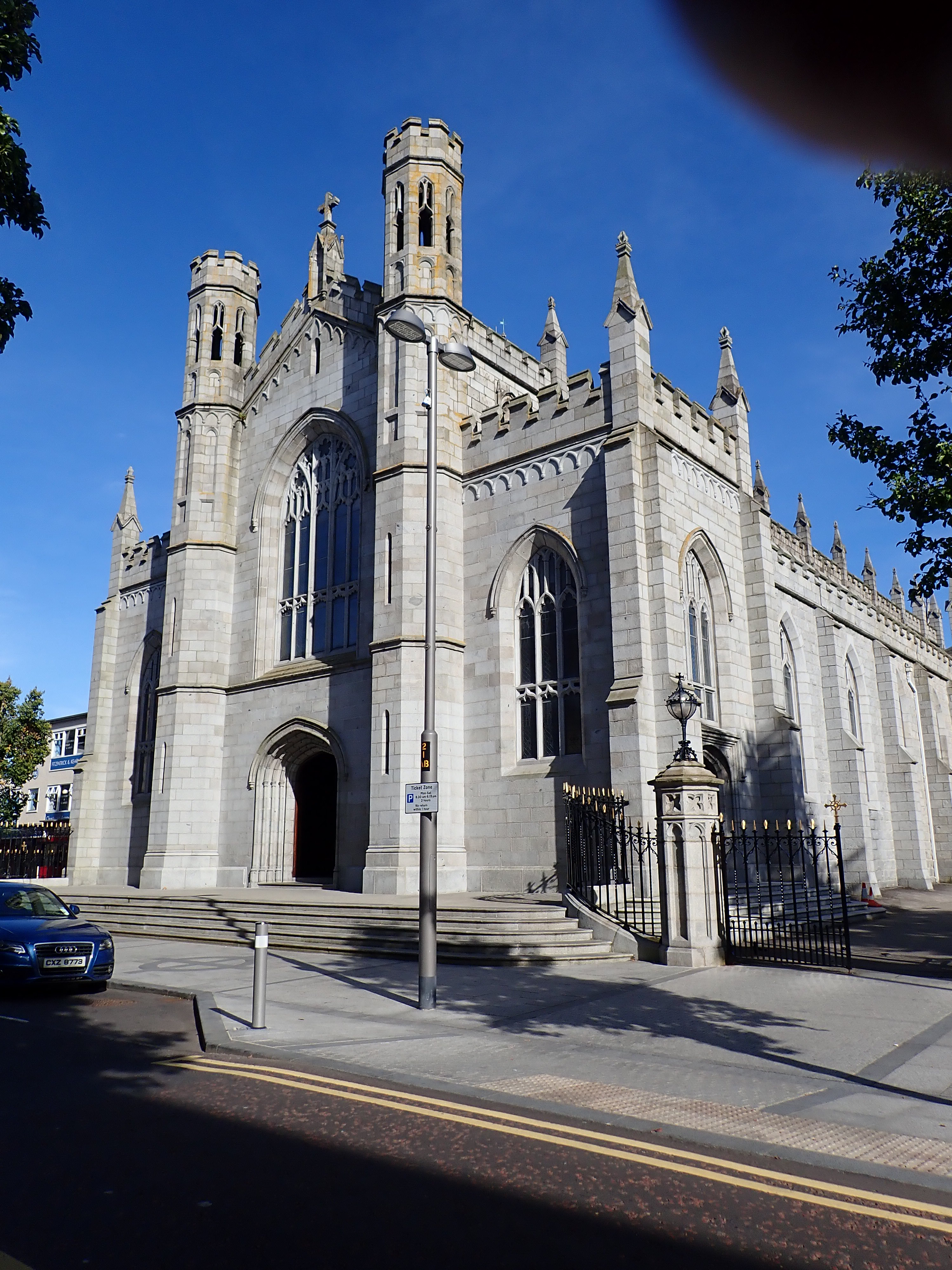
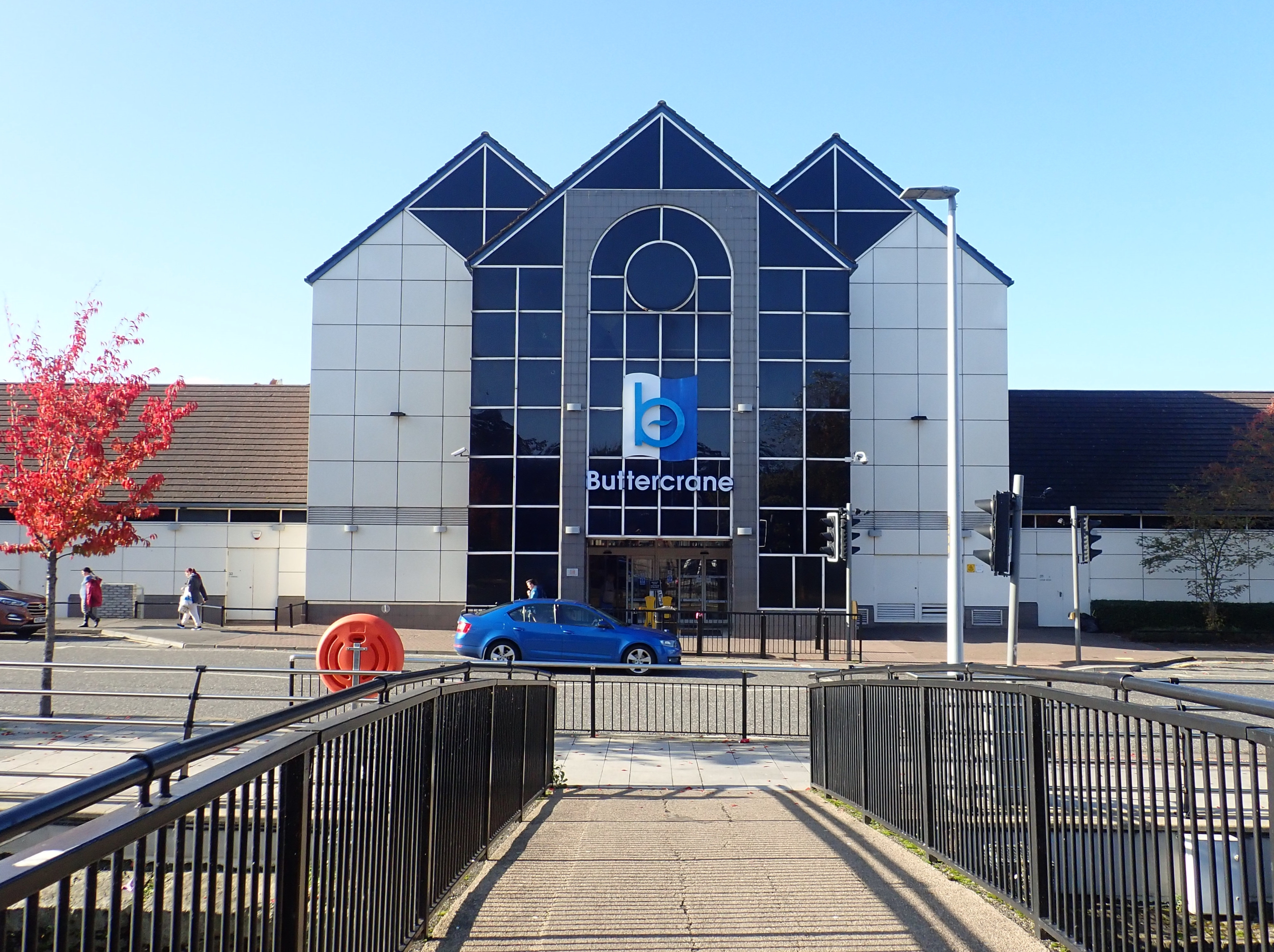
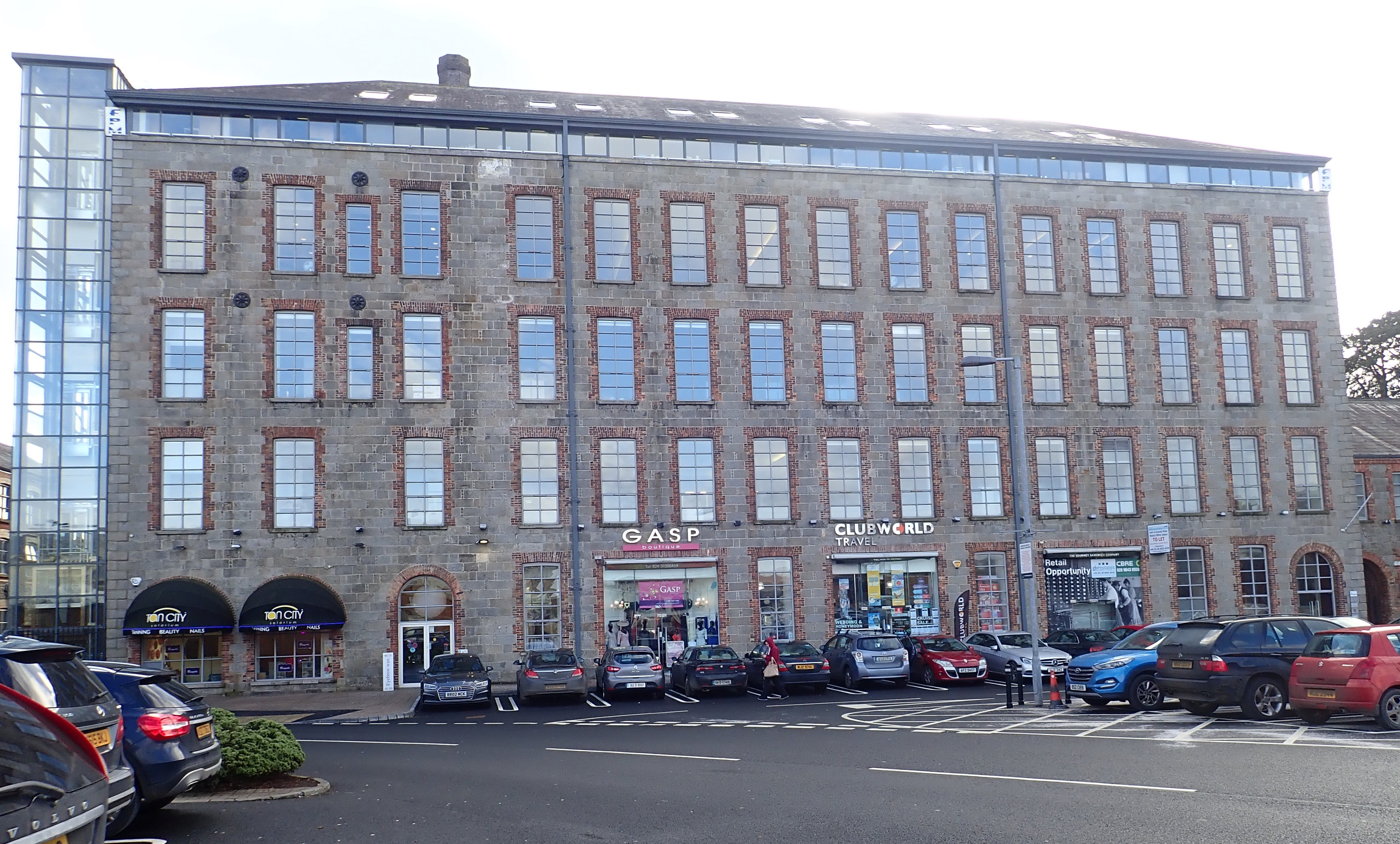
- Top: Newry skyline, Middle: Newry Town Hall, Newry Cathedral, Buttercrane, The Quays, Bottom: Drumalane Mill

- Coat of Arms

- Location within Northern Ireland
- Population: 27,913 (2021 census)
- Irish grid reference: J085265
- District: Newry, Mourne and Down
- County: County Armagh and County Down
- Country: Northern Ireland
- Sovereign state: United Kingdom
- Post town: NEWRY
- Postcode district: BT34, BT35
- Dialling code: 028
- Police: Northern Ireland
- Fire: Northern Ireland
- Ambulance: Northern Ireland
- UK Parliament: Newry and Armagh
- Website: www.newrymournedown.org

Newry (/ˈnjʊəri/; from Irish Iúr Cinn Trá) is a cathedral city in Northern Ireland, standing on the Clanrye River in counties Armagh and Down. It is near the border with the Republic of Ireland, on the main routes between Belfast (34 miles/55 km away) and Dublin (67 miles/108 km away). The population was 27,913 in 2021.

Newry was founded in 1144 as a settlement around a Cistercian abbey. In the 16th century the English dissolved the abbey and built Bagenal's Castle on the site. Newry grew as a market town and a garrison, and became a port in 1742 when the Newry Canal was opened, the first summit-level canal in Ireland. It is the episcopal seat of the Roman Catholic Diocese of Dromore. In 2002, as part of the Golden Jubilee of Elizabeth II, Newry was granted city status along with Lisburn.

== Name ==
The name Newry is an anglicization of Iúr Cinn Trá (Irish: [ˌuːɾˠ ˌcɪn̠ʲ ˈt̪ˠɾˠaː], "yew tree at the head of the strand"), which is the most common Irish name for Newry. This relates to an apocryphal story that Saint Patrick planted a yew tree there in the 5th century.

The Irish name Cathair an Iúir (City of Newry) appears on some bilingual signs around the city.

== History ==
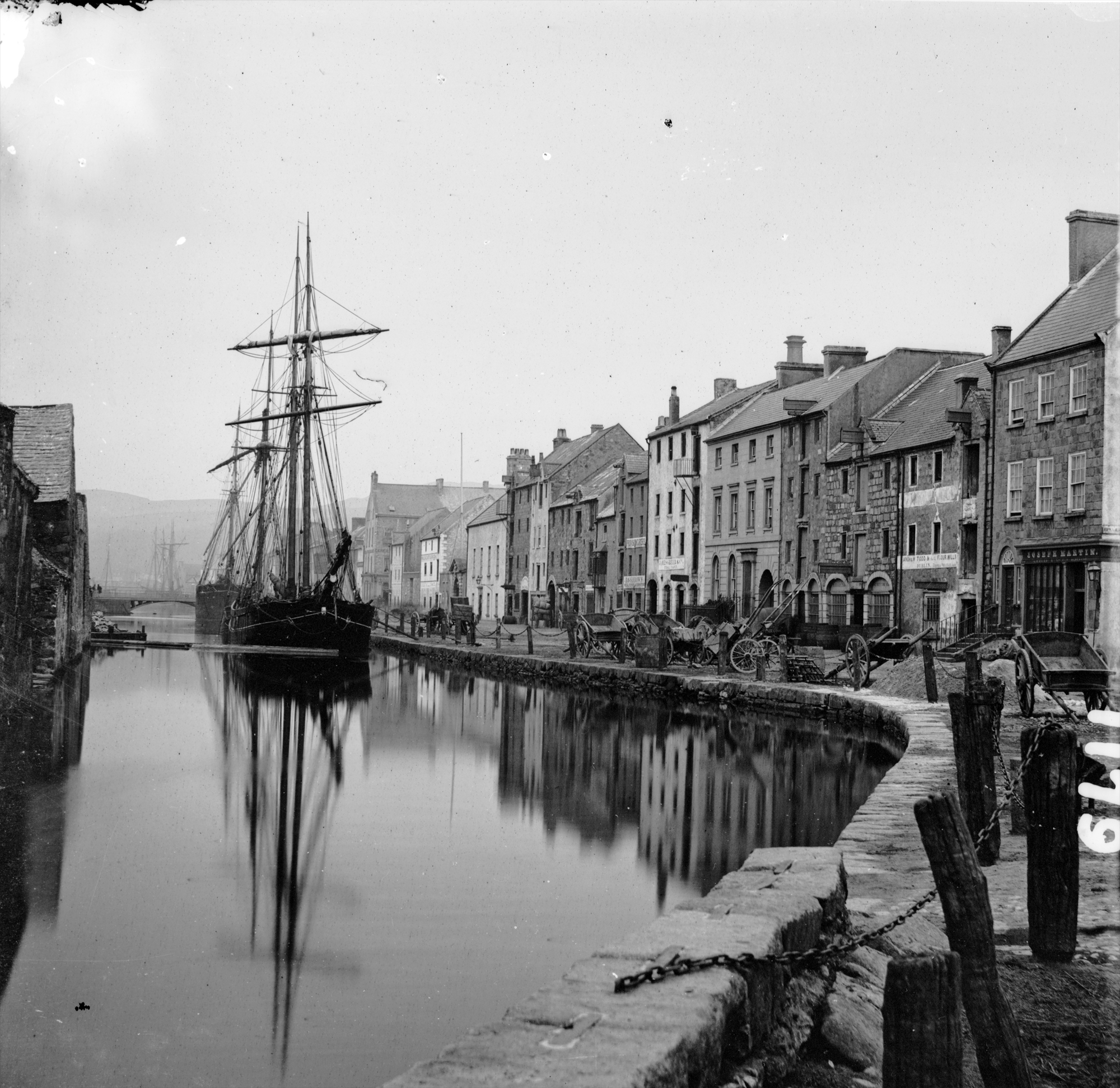
Merchants Quay, Newry, in the late 19th century

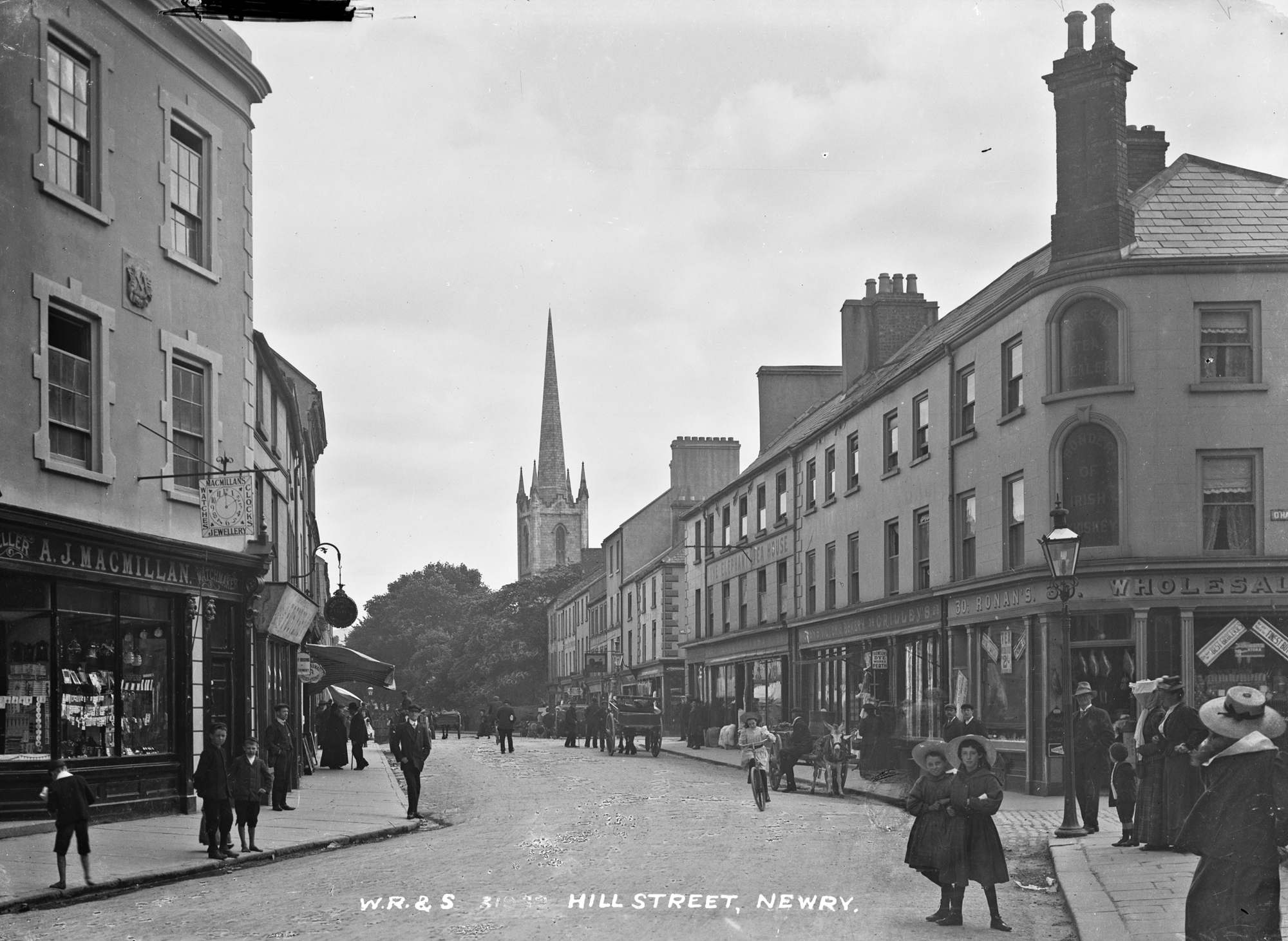
Hill Street in the early 1900s

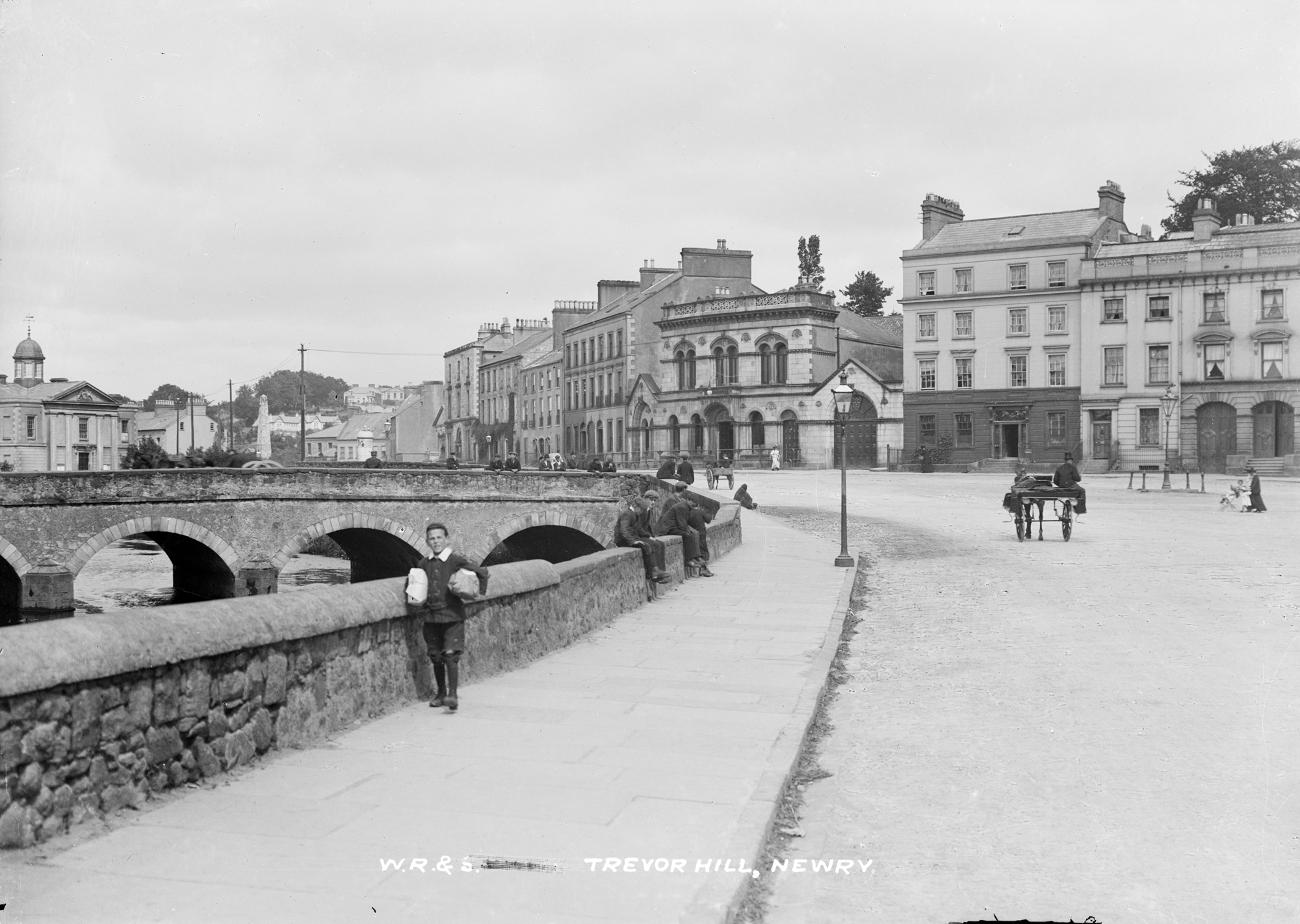
Trevor Hill in the early 1900s

There is evidence of continual human habitation in the area from early times. During the Bronze Age, the Newry area had a community that made very detailed jewellery for garments in abundance. Three of these Newry Clasps can be found in the Ulster Museum, and a massive arm clasp from the same period was also found in Newry. Three miles south of Newry is Clontygorra Court Cairn which has large portal stones at its entrance. Excavations revealed pot sherds, hollow scrapers, a polished axe and the cremated remains of one person. Nearby is another, smaller court cairn.

In AD 820, Vikings landed in the Newry area, "from whence they proceeded to Armagh, taking it by storm, and plundering and desolating the country around".

=== Early history ===
A Cistercian abbey was founded at Newry in 1144; in 1157 it was granted a charter by Muirchertach Mac Lochlainn, king of Tír Eoghain and High King of Ireland. It might have been a Benedictine monastery before this. Newry Abbey (now the area around Newry Museum) would have been a sprawling complex of buildings and the heart of a monastic settlement. It existed for four centuries. The abbey was dissolved by the English in 1548, when it was recorded to consist of a church, steeple, college, chapter house, dormitory, a hall, a graveyard, two orchards, and one garden. Modern archaeologists unearthed thirty-three burials from part of the former graveyard, and further bones were found in charnel pits. They included remains of men, women, and several youths, and some of the individuals suffered violent deaths. It is believed this was a graveyard for the lay community from when the abbey was still in existence.

In April 1552, Nicholas Bagenal, Marshal of the English army in Ireland, was granted ownership of the former abbey lands. He built a fortified house known as Bagenal's Castle on the site of the abbey and its graveyard, re-using some of the abbey buildings. Bagenal also had an earthen rampart built around his Castle and the small town of Newry.

During the Irish Rebellion of 1641, Newry was captured by Irish Catholic rebels led by the Magennises and McCartans. In May 1642, a Scottish Covenanter army landed in Ulster and seized Newry from the rebels. James Turner, one of the Scottish officers, recounted that Catholic rebels and civilians were taken to the bridge over the Newry River and "butchered to death ... some by shooting, some by hanging ... without any legal process". The Scottish general, Robert Monro, said that sixty townsmen and two priests were summarily executed. Turner also said that Scottish soldiers drowned and shot about a dozen Irishwomen before he stopped them from killing more.

During the 1689 Raid on Newry, Williamite forces under Toby Purcell repulsed an attack by the Jacobites under the Marquis de Boisseleau. During the period of the Battle of the Boyne, the Duke of Berwick set fire to the parts of the town which he had restructured to defend it.

=== Modern era ===
Newry suffered hunger, poverty and mass emigration during the Great Famine (An Gorta Mór) in the 1840s. The population of the workhouse increased to over a thousand, while ships sailed from nearby Warrenpoint to New York, carrying over 5000 people during the Famine.

The 1841 census gives the combined population of the two halves of the city as 11,972 inhabitants. By 1881 the population of Newry had reached 15,590.

During the Irish War of Independence there were several assassinations and ambushes in Newry. On 12 December 1920, British reinforcements travelling from Newry to Camlough were ambushed by the Irish Republican Army (IRA), who opened fire and threw grenades from MacNeill's Egyptian Arch. Three IRA members were fatally wounded in the exchange of fire.

When Ireland was partitioned in 1921, Newry became part of Northern Ireland. From the 1920s to the 1960s, Newry Urban District Council was one of the few councils in Northern Ireland which had a majority of councillors from the Catholic/Irish nationalist community. The reason, according to Michael Farrell, was that this community formed such a large majority in the town, around 80% of the population, making it impossible to gerrymander. Also, an oddity was that for a time it was controlled by the Irish Labour Party, after the left wing of the Northern Ireland Labour Party defected to them in the 1940s.

Newry saw several violent incidents during the conflict known as the Troubles, including a triple killing in 1971, a bombing in 1972, and a mortar attack in 1985. These continued into the late 1990s and even in 2010 – such as bomb scares and car bombs.

See also: The Troubles in Killeen, for information on incidents at the border and customs post at Newry on the border with the Republic of Ireland and close to Newry. In 2003, the British Army's hilltop watchtowers overlooking Newry were taken down. The British Army withdrew from the area on 25 June 2007 when they closed their final base at Bessbrook.

== Geography ==
Newry lies in the most southeastern part of both Ulster and Northern Ireland. About half of the city (the west) lies in County Armagh and the other half (the east) in County Down. The Clanrye River, which runs through the city, from Carnmeen (north of the Carnbane Industrial Estate) until Middlebank (start of Warrenpoint Road), partly forms the historic border between County Armagh and County Down.

The city sits in a valley, between the Mourne Mountains to the east and the Ring of Gullion to the south-west, both of which are designated Areas of Outstanding Natural Beauty. The Cooley Mountains lie to the southeast. The Clanrye River runs through the centre of town, parallel to the Newry Canal. The city also lies at the northernmost end of Carlingford Lough, where the canal enters the sea at Victoria Locks.

=== Townlands ===
Newry is within the civil parishes of Newry and Middle Killeavy. The parishes have long been divided into townlands, the names of which mainly come from the Irish language. The following is a list of townlands in Newry's urban area, alongside their likely etymologies:

County Armagh
Townland	Origin (Irish unless stated)	Translation
Altnaveigh; Aghnaveigh (alternate local name)	Alt na bhFiach; Achadh na bhFiach	glen of the ravens field of the ravens
Ballinlare	Baile na Ladhaire	townland of the fork/gap
Carnagat	Carn na gCat	cairn of the cats
Carnbane	Carn Bán	white cairn
Cloghoge	Clochóg	stony place
Derry Beg	Doire Beag	little oak wood
Drumalane	An Droim Leathan	broad ridge
Lisdrumgullion	Lios Droim gCuilinn	fort of the holly ridge
Lisdrumliska	Lios Druim Loiscthe	fort of the burnt ridge

County Down
Townland	Origin (Irish unless stated)	Translation
Ballynacraig	Baile na gCreag	townland of the crags
Carneyhough	origin unclear	—
Cloghanramer	Clochán Ramhar	thick stone structure/causeway
Commons	an English name that first appeared in 1810	—
Creeve	Craobh	tree/bush
Damolly	probably Damh Maoile	house of the round hill
Drumcashellone	probably Droim Caisil Eoghain	the ridge of Eoghan's cashel
Greenan	Grianán	eminent or sunny place

== Demography ==
National Identity of Newry residents (2021)
Nationality	Per cent
Irish	61.3%
Northern Irish	22.8%
British	9.1%

=== 2021 Census ===
On Census day (21 March 2021) there were 28,530 people living in Newry. Of these:

- 21.32% were aged under 16, 29.12% were aged between 16 and 65, and 14.51% were aged 66 and over.
- 50.87% of the usually resident population were female and 49.13% were male.
- 86.52% (24,685) belong to or were brought up Catholic, 8.07% (2,302) belong to or were brought up Protestant (including other Christian-related denominations), 1.24% (353) belong to or were brought up in an 'other' religion, and 4.17% (1,190) did not adhere to or weren't brought up in any religion.
- 61.29% indicated they had an Irish national identity, 22.76% indicated they had a Northern Irish national identity, and 9.13% indicated they had a British national identity, and 13.30% indicated they had an 'other' national identity. (respondents could indicate more than one national identity)
- 20.50% had some knowledge of Irish (Gaeilge) and 2.64% had some knowledge of Ulster Scots.

=== 2011 Census ===
On Census day (27 March 2011) there were 26,967 people living in Newry, accounting for 1.49% of the NI total. Of these:

- 21.46% were aged under 16 years, and 12.74% were aged 65 and over.
- 51.02% of the usually resident population were female and 48.98% were male.
- 88.27% belong to or were brought up in the Catholic religion and 8.47% belong to or were brought up in a 'Protestant and Other Christian (including Christian related)' religion.
- 56.12% had an Irish national identity, 27.27% had a Northern Irish national identity and 12.65% indicated that they had a British national identity (respondents could indicate more than one national identity).
- 35 years was the average (median) age of the population.
- 19.60% had some knowledge of Irish (Gaeilge) and 2.37% had some knowledge of Ulster-Scots.

== Climate ==
As with the rest of Northern Ireland, Newry has a temperate climate, with a narrow range of temperatures, regular windy conditions, and rainfall throughout the year.

Climate data for Newry, United Kingdom (Glenanne climate station at 161m elevation) 1991–2020 normals
Month	Jan	Feb	Mar	Apr	May	Jun	Jul	Aug	Sep	Oct	Nov	Dec	Year
Mean daily maximum °C (°F)	6.9 (44.4)	7.5 (45.5)	9.3 (48.7)	11.8 (53.2)	14.8 (58.6)	17.2 (63.0)	18.6 (65.5)	18.3 (64.9)	16.1 (61.0)	12.6 (54.7)	9.3 (48.7)	7.1 (44.8)	12.5 (54.4)
Mean daily minimum °C (°F)	2.0 (35.6)	2.0 (35.6)	2.8 (37.0)	4.4 (39.9)	6.6 (43.9)	9.4 (48.9)	11.2 (52.2)	11.1 (52.0)	9.4 (48.9)	6.9 (44.4)	4.1 (39.4)	2.3 (36.1)	6.0 (42.8)
Average rainfall mm (inches)	103.6 (4.08)	82.1 (3.23)	78.2 (3.08)	73.0 (2.87)	68.1 (2.68)	69.8 (2.75)	78.9 (3.11)	84.8 (3.34)	77.4 (3.05)	101.8 (4.01)	108.1 (4.26)	107.9 (4.25)	1,033.7 (40.71)
Average rainy days (≥ 1.0 mm)	16.0	13.9	13.8	12.6	12.5	12.3	14.0	14.3	12.9	15.0	15.7	15.9	168.9
Source: metoffice.gov.uk

== Economy ==
Newry has traditionally been considered a merchant's town, and has maintained a reputation as one of the best provincial shopping-towns in Northern Ireland, with the Buttercrane Centre and The Quays Newry attracting large numbers of shoppers from as far away as Cork.

In 2006 Newry house prices grew the most across the whole United Kingdom over the previous decade, as prices in the city had increased by 371% since 1996. The city itself has become markedly more prosperous in recent years. Unemployment has reduced from over 26% in 1991 to scarcely 2% in 2008.

Since the 2008 financial crisis, residents of the Republic of Ireland have increasingly been cross-border shopping to Newry to buy cheaper goods due to the difference in currency. The harsh budget in the Republic of Ireland in October 2008, and the growing strength of the euro against the pound sterling and VAT reductions in the United Kingdom, compared with increases in the Republic of Ireland, are among the reasons. This remarkable increase in cross-border trade has become so widespread that it has lent its name to a general phenomenon known as the Newry effect. In December 2008, The New York Times described Newry as "the hottest shopping spot within the European Union's open borders, a place where consumers armed with euros enjoy a currency discount averaging 30 percent or more".

However the increased flow of trade has led to resultant tailbacks, sometimes several miles long, on approach roads from the south. This has created huge traffic and parking problems in Newry and the surrounding area. It has also become a political issue, with some politicians in the Republic of Ireland claiming that such cross-border shopping is "unpatriotic".

Newry is the global HQ of First Derivatives Plc.

== Governance ==
=== Local government ===
The city of Newry is part of Newry, Mourne and Down District Council. The 2023 Newry, Mourne and Down District Council election resulted in 4 Sinn Féin and 2 SDLP councillors being elected in the Newry electoral area.

Council members from 2023 election
District electoral area	Name	Party
Newry	Geraldine Kearns	Sinn Féin
Newry	Cathal King	Sinn Féin
Newry	Michael Savage	SDLP
Newry	Aidan Mathers	Sinn Féin
Newry	Valerie Harte	Sinn Féin
Newry	Doire Finn	SDLP

Council members from 2019 election
District electoral area	Name	Party
Newry	Gavin Malone	Independent
Newry	Roisin Mulgrew †	Sinn Féin
Newry	Michael Savage	SDLP
Newry	Charlie Casey	Sinn Féin
Newry	Valerie Harte	Sinn Féin
Newry	Gary Stokes	SDLP

Council members from 2014 election
District electoral area	Name	Party
Newry	Charlie Casey	Sinn Féin
Newry	Liz Kimmins	Sinn Féin
Newry	Valerie Harte	Sinn Féin
Newry	Davy Hyland	Independent
Newry	Gary Stokes	SDLP
Newry	Kevin McAteer	SDLP

=== Northern Ireland assembly ===
Newry is part of the Assembly constituency of Newry and Armagh. In the 2022 elections, the following were elected to the Northern Ireland Assembly: Liz Kimmins, Cathal Boylan, Conor Murphy (all members of Sinn Féin), Justin McNulty of the SDLP and William Irwin of the DUP. In 2025, Conor Murphy stood down from his position to be replaced by Aoife Finnegan.

Election	MLA (party)	MLA (party)	MLA (party)	MLA (party)	MLA (party)	MLA (party)
1996	Maria Caraher (Sinn Féin)	Patrick McNamee (Sinn Féin)	Frank Feely (SDLP)	Seamus Mallon (SDLP)	Jim Speers (UUP)	5 seats 1996–1998
1998	Conor Murphy (Sinn Féin)	Patrick McNamee (Sinn Féin)	John Fee (SDLP)	Seamus Mallon (SDLP)	Paul Berry (DUP)	Danny Kennedy (UUP)
2003	Conor Murphy (Sinn Féin)	Davy Hyland (Sinn Féin)	Pat O'Rawe (Sinn Féin)	Dominic Bradley (SDLP)	Paul Berry (DUP)	Danny Kennedy (UUP)
2007	Conor Murphy (Sinn Féin)	Cathal Boylan (Sinn Féin)	Mickey Brady (Sinn Féin)	Dominic Bradley (SDLP)	William Irwin (DUP)	Danny Kennedy (UUP)
2011	Conor Murphy (Sinn Féin)	Cathal Boylan (Sinn Féin)	Mickey Brady (Sinn Féin)	Dominic Bradley (SDLP)	William Irwin (DUP)	Danny Kennedy (UUP)
July 2012 co-option	Megan Fearon (Sinn Féin)	Cathal Boylan (Sinn Féin)	Mickey Brady (Sinn Féin)	Dominic Bradley (SDLP)	William Irwin (DUP)	Danny Kennedy (UUP)
June 2015 co-option	Megan Fearon (Sinn Féin)	Cathal Boylan (Sinn Féin)	Conor Murphy (Sinn Féin)	Dominic Bradley (SDLP)	William Irwin (DUP)	Danny Kennedy (UUP)
2016	Megan Fearon (Sinn Féin)	Cathal Boylan (Sinn Féin)	Conor Murphy (Sinn Féin)	Justin McNulty (SDLP)	William Irwin (DUP)	Danny Kennedy (UUP)
2017	Megan Fearon (Sinn Féin)	Cathal Boylan (Sinn Féin)	Conor Murphy (Sinn Féin)	Justin McNulty (SDLP)	William Irwin (DUP)	5 seats 2017–present
January 2020 co-option	Liz Kimmins (Sinn Féin)	Cathal Boylan (Sinn Féin)	Conor Murphy (Sinn Féin)	Justin McNulty (SDLP)	William Irwin (DUP)	5 seats 2017–present
2022	Liz Kimmins (Sinn Féin)	Cathal Boylan (Sinn Féin)	Conor Murphy (Sinn Féin)	Justin McNulty (SDLP)	William Irwin (DUP)	5 seats 2017–present
February 2025 co-option	Liz Kimmins (Sinn Féin)	Cathal Boylan (Sinn Féin)	Aoife Finnegan (Sinn Féin)	Justin McNulty (SDLP)	William Irwin (DUP)	5 seats 2017–present
January 2026 co-option	Liz Kimmins (Sinn Féin)	Cathal Boylan (Sinn Féin)	Aoife Finnegan (Sinn Féin)	Justin McNulty (SDLP)	Gareth Wilson (DUP)	5 seats 2017–present

Note: The columns in this table are used only for presentational purposes, and no significance should be attached to the order of columns. For details of the order in which seats were won at each election, see the detailed results of that election.

=== Westminster ===
Together with part of the district of Newry, Mourne and Down, Newry forms the constituency of Newry and Armagh for elections to the Westminster Parliament. The Member of Parliament is Dáire Hughes of Sinn Féin. He won the seat in the 2024 United Kingdom general election.

== Transport ==
- The Newry Canal opened in 1742. It is the oldest Canal in Ireland or Britain and when functioning as an inland transport waterway, it ran for 18 miles (29 kilometres) to Lough Neagh. In 1777, Newry was ranked the fourth largest port in Ireland. Some surviving 18th and 19th century warehouses still line the canal, and now many houses, shops and restaurants.
- In 1885 an electric tramway was opened between Newry and Bessbrook.
- MacNeill's Egyptian Arch is a railway bridge located near Newry. It was selected for the design of the British one pound coin to represent Northern Ireland for 2006.
- Newry is served by an Ulsterbus bus station in the city centre. It is situated along The Mall, suspended over the Clanrye River. Services in Newry include local, regional and cross-border transport, with a free shuttle bus service to the local train station and services to local schools around Newry and Mourne.
- Newry railway station, rebuilt in 2009, offers cross-border services on the Dublin-Belfast line as well as some regional services around areas of County Armagh and County Down. Transport to other places generally requires a change in either Belfast or Dublin.
- Newry is on the main M1/A1 route from Dublin to Belfast. Originally the route passed through the town centre, but in the 60s was bypassed by the Abbey Link. This remained the sole relief road until 1996 when it was superseded by a single carriageway bypass round the western side of the town. By 2008 the road on either side of the town had been upgraded to motorway/high quality dual carriageway standard (southwards from Cloghogue) and low quality dual carriageway (northwards from Beechill). In July 2010 a new high quality dual carriageway with motorway characteristics was opened to bridge the gap, thus connecting Dublin with Belfast by motorway/dual carriageway for the first time. The opening of this section of road meant that motorists could travel from Clogh in County Antrim to Midleton, County Cork by dual carriageway/motorway. Part of this older bypass is still in use between the Camlough Road (A25) and the Belfast Road (A1). Newry suffers from very heavy traffic with shoppers coming from across the border. Newry is connected with Warrenpoint by a lower quality dual carriageway, some seven miles (eleven kilometres) to the south.
- Newry is linked to Belfast via National Cycle Route 9, via Portadown, Lisburn and Craigavon. The route is planned to eventually extend to Dublin.

== Notable buildings ==
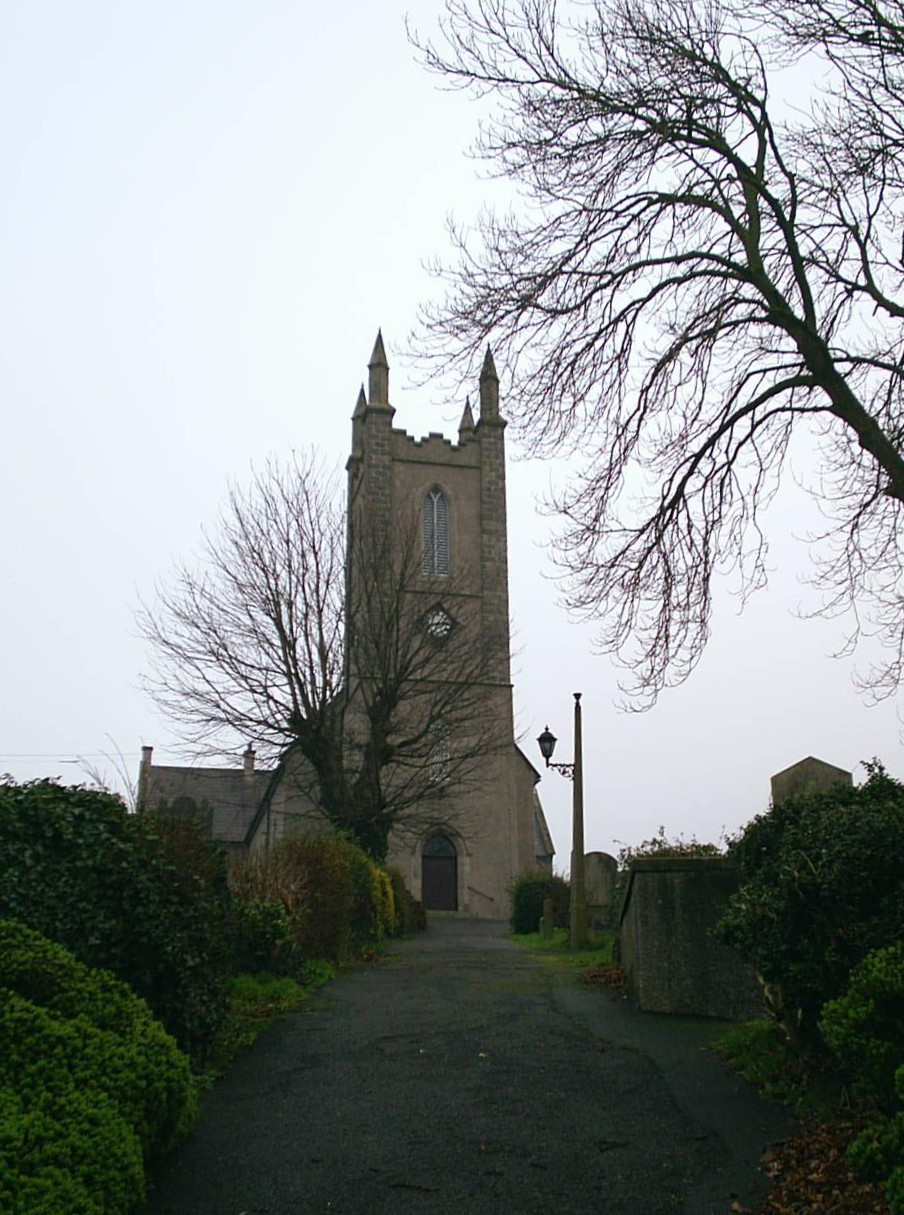
Saint Patrick's Church, Newry

Saint Patrick's Church was built in 1578 on the instructions of Nicholas Bagenal, who was granted the monastery lands by Edward VI, and is considered to be the first Protestant church in Ireland.

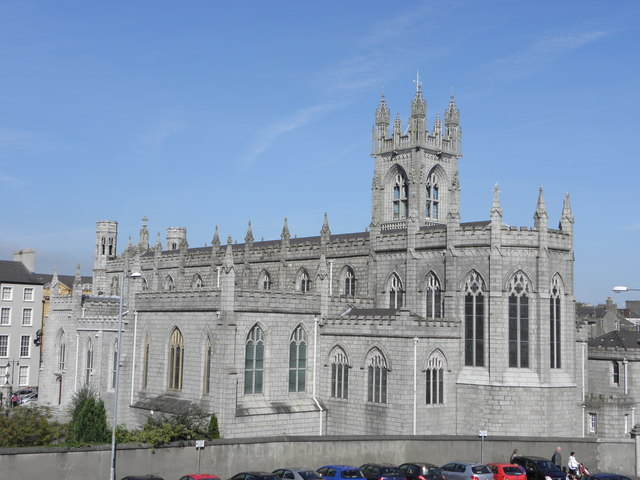
Catholic Cathedral of SS. Patrick and Colman, Newry

The Cathedral of SS Patrick and Colman on Hill Street was built in 1829 at a cost of £8,000. The structure, which consists of local granite, was designed and built by Thomas Duff, arguably Newry's greatest architect to date.

Incidentally, Thomas Duff also was the architect for the Cathedral in Dundalk, a town just over the border in County Louth, and it is said that he mixed up the plans for both cathedrals and sent Dundalk Cathedral to the builders in Newry, and Newry Cathedral to the builders in Dundalk.

Newry Town Hall is notable for being built over the River Clanrye which is the historic boundary between the counties of Armagh and Down.

The Craigmore Viaduct lies just north of the city on the Northern Ireland Railways Belfast-Dublin mainline. The bridge was designed by Sir John MacNeill with construction beginning in 1849. The bridge was formally opened in 1852. The viaduct consists of eighteen arches the highest being 126 feet, the highest viaduct in Ireland. It is around one-quarter mile (400 metres) long and was constructed from local granite. The Enterprise train link from Belfast to Dublin crosses the bridge.

The Newry Reporter every week highlights a historic building in Newry and the surrounding area, giving a brief outline of its history.

=== Hospitals ===
- Daisy Hill Hospital

=== Churches ===
==== Roman Catholic ====
- Cathedral of Saints Patrick and Colman, Hill Street (1825–29)
- Church of the Sacred Heart and St Catherine, Dominic Street (1875)
- St Brigid's, Derrybeg (1970)
- St Mary's, Chapel Street (1789; formerly Newry Cathedral)
- Church of the Sacred Heart, Cloghogue (1916)
- Church of the Assumption, Drumalane (1954)
- Church of the Immaculate Conception (Parochial House), 44 Barrack Street

==== Protestant ====
- St Patrick's Church of Ireland (1578) -- possibly the first Protestant church ever built in Ireland. It was destroyed by fire and rebuilt.
- St Mary's Church of Ireland (1819)
- Methodist Church, Sandy's Street
- Newry Baptist Church, Downshire Place
- First Presbyterian Church (Non-Subscribing), John Mitchel Place
- Downshire Road Presbyterian Church, Downshire Road (1843)
- Sandy's Street Presbyterian Church, Sandy's Street
- Riverside Reformed Presbyterian Church, Basin Walk
- The Salvation Army, Trevor Hill
- Metropolitan Church, Edward Street

==== Other ====
- Kingdom Hall of Jehovah's Witnesses, Belfast Road

== Notable people ==
The following is a non-exhaustive list of notable individuals who were either born in Newry or lived in Newry.

=== Arts and media ===
- Christine Lampard, television host
- Margaret Clarke (1881–1961), portrait painter
- Thomas Duff (1792–1848), architect
- Julia Glover, 18th and 19th century actress
- Frank Hall (1921–1995), broadcaster and satirist
- Seán Hillen, photographer and artist
- Valene Kane, actress
- Michael Legge, actor
- John and Susan Lynch, actor siblings
- Tomm Moore, filmmaker
- Gerard Murphy, actor
- Nuala Quinn-Barton, Irish American independent film producer, talent manager and fashion model

=== Groups ===
- The 4 of Us, rock band
- Luv Bug, pop group
- Crubeen, 1970s folk band

=== Religion ===
- John Dunlop, Presbyterian churchman
- John Magee, Roman Catholic Bishop of Cloyne

=== Academia and science ===
- Leonard Abrahamson (1896–1961), cardiologist
- Joseph Barcroft (1872–1947), respiratory physiologist
- W. J. Barre (1830–1867), architect
- Elizabeth Gould Bell (1862–1934), doctor

=== Politics and diplomacy ===
- Isaac Corry (1753–1813), Member of Parliament for Newry (1776), Irish Chancellor of the Exchequer (1799–1802)
- Sir Trevor Corry (1724–1780), British diplomat
- Sir William Hill Irvine (1858–1943), Australian politician
- Alfred Ludlam (1810–1877), New Zealand politician and philanthropist
- Donna Maguire (born 1967), Provisional Irish Republican Army
- John Martin (1812–1875), Irish nationalist
- John Mitchel, Irish patriot
- Pádraig Ó Cuinn (1898–1974), Irish Republican Army
- Charles Russell, Baron Russell of Killowen (1832–1900), Lord Chief Justice of England and Wales
- James Wilson (1832–1921), Fenian who was transported as a convict to Western Australia and later escaped during the Catalpa rescue.

=== Sport ===
- Terence Bannon, mountaineer
- Michael Cusack (1847–1906), founder of the Gaelic Athletic Association
- Pat Jennings, football goalkeeper
- Willie Maley (1868–1958), football manager
- Danny McAlinden, heavyweight boxer
- Shay McCartan, footballer
- Ryan McGivern, footballer
- Peter McParland, footballer
- Seán O'Neill, Gaelic footballer
- Ronan Rafferty, golfer
- Charlie Smyth, NFL kicker and former Gaelic footballer
- Kane Tucker, Irish international boxer

=== Other ===
- William Hare (c.1807 - 1829) Bodysnatcher and murderer
- James Heather (1867–1958) 19th century firefighter
- Jackie McClelland (1923–1981) 20th century firefighter
- John McClelland (1951–2022) former Chief Fire Officer of Northern Ireland

== Sport ==
=== Football ===
Until 2012, Newry City F.C. played at the Showgrounds before being liquidated. A phoenix club named Newry City AFC was formed to play in amateur leagues in 2013, and was promoted to the NIFL Premiership in 2018.

Bessbrook United F.C. are a Mid-Ulster Football League team with origins from the 1900's. They won the IFA Junior Cup in 1931, and are back-to-back Mid-Ulster Football League Champions, including inaugural winners of the current format.

=== Darts ===
The Northern Ireland Open is held in Bellini's, Merchant's Quay, Newry as the primary venue. It has been running since 2003. The inaugural winner was Gary Anderson for the men's tournament. There are also tournaments for women, boys and girls.

=== Gaelic Athletic Association ===
The Down GAA Gaelic Football team has its home ground at Páirc Esler in the city.

Local clubs are:

in Down GAA:

- Newry Bosco GFC,
- Newry Shamrocks GAC,

in Armagh GAA:

- Thomas Davis GFC, Corrinshego
- Killeavy St Moninna's GAC

=== Rugby Union ===
Newry RFC (also known as Newry Rugby Club, Newry RFU or Newry) is an Irish amateur rugby union club, founded in 1925. The club is a member of the Irish Rugby Football Union's Ulster branch. The club currently fields three senior teams and several junior teams ranging from under-12 to under-18 and a women's team for the first time in 2010–2011 season. The club's home ground is known as Telford Park. The team currently has two playing fields located at this ground along with the clubhouse on the outskirts of Newry.

== Education ==
Primary Schools

- Cloughoge Primary School
- Killean Primary School
- St Clare's Abbey Primary School ( formerly St Clares convent primary school and St. Colman's Abbey Christian Brothers' Primary School)
- St Joseph's Convent Primary School
- St Malachy's Primary School
- St Malachy’s Primary School, Carnagat
- St. Patrick's Primary School, Newry|St Patrick's Primary School
- Windsor Hill Primary School
- St Ronan's Primary School

Post-Primary Schools

- Abbey Christian Brothers Grammar School
- Newry High School
- Our Lady's Grammar School
- Sacred Heart Grammar School
- St Colman's College
- St Joseph's Boys' High School
- St. Mary's High School
- St. Paul's High School, Bessbrook

Further Education

- Southern Regional College

== See also ==
- Newry (civil parish)
- List of localities in Northern Ireland by population
