= James Heather (firefighter) =

Irish firefighter

James Heather KPM
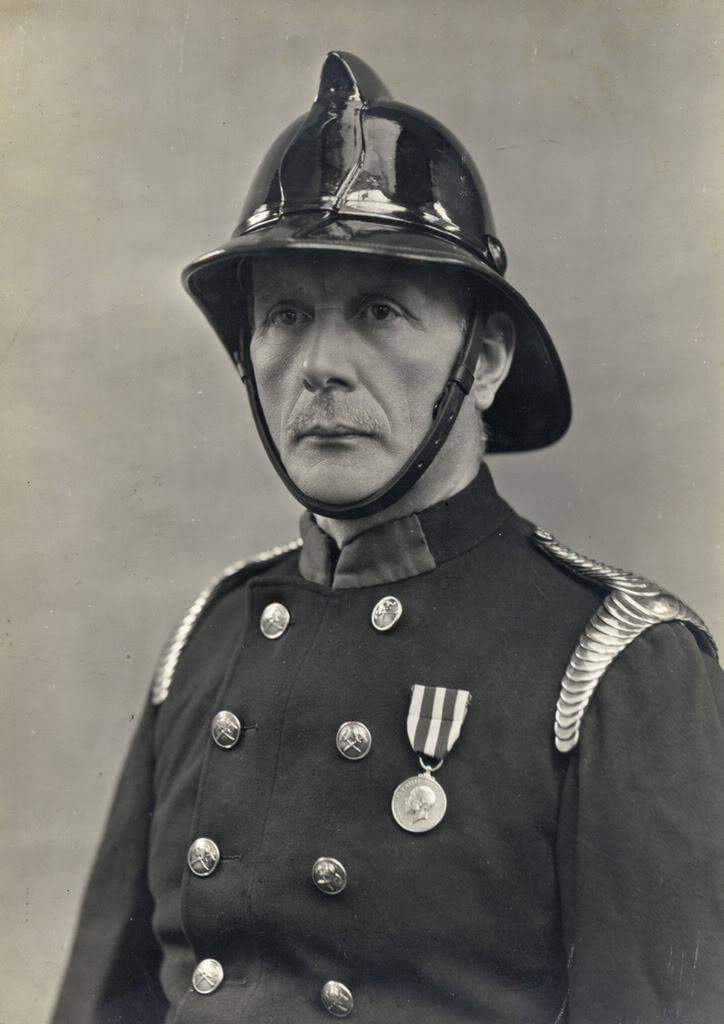
- Born: James Henry Heather; August 17, 1867; Newry, Ireland
- Died: January 22, 1958 (aged 90); Warrenpoint, Northern Ireland
- Other name: Jimmy Heather
- Occupation: Public house proprietor
- Known for: Firefighter

James Henry Heather KPM (17 August 1867 – 22 January 1958), otherwise known as Jimmy, was an Irish firefighter who served for over 50 years in Newry and Warrenpoint.

== Career ==
James Heather operated a public house on Water Street in Newry, founded by his father and taken over after his death in 1897.

Heather was a volunteer firefighter who served for 52 years starting in 1891, and rose to honorary Fire Captain of both Newry fire station, and Warrenpoint's for 17 years. He attended many fires over the years, most notably the great Sands' Mill fire of 1910 where "he took a prominent part in saving the Newry Cathedral from being involved".

== Honors and awards ==
In 1930, he attended Buckingham Palace to become the first civilian to be awarded the King's Police and Fire Services Medal by King George V for "39 years of exemplary service distinguished by special merit and ability".

In 1941 it was reported that Heather had by then saved the lives of eight people; four from fire and four from drowing. In 1942, Heather received an award from the Society for the Protection of Life from Fire "in recognition of distinguished conduct" for rescuing a person during a fire in 1941, and he received an award from the Royal Humane Society for saving someone from drowning.

In 1942 he was recognized by the Urban Council for his 50 years of honorary service, "Wherever there was a fire in the town James Heather was there—and in most cases the first on the scene. The services which he gave were at all times valuable, and willingly rendered."

Commissioned in 1976 by the Newry and Mourne District Council and opened in 1982, "Heather Park" was named in his honour. Its name was suggested by the late councillor and former Sub Officer of Newry, Jackie McClelland.

== Personal life ==
James Heather was a member and honorary huntsman of the Newry Harriers club (Note: See Beagling § Hunting with Harriers.) for more than 50 years, for which he presented with a salver and clock for his service. He was also a member and officeholder of the Newry Agricultural Society, and a correspondent for the Newry Reporter, covering the activities of several hunt clubs.

Heather died on 22 January 1958 at his residence "Thandra" Seaview in Warrenpoint, and was survived by his wife and three sons.
