= Saint Patrick's, Newry =

Coordinates: 54.176°N 6.332°W

Saint Patrick's
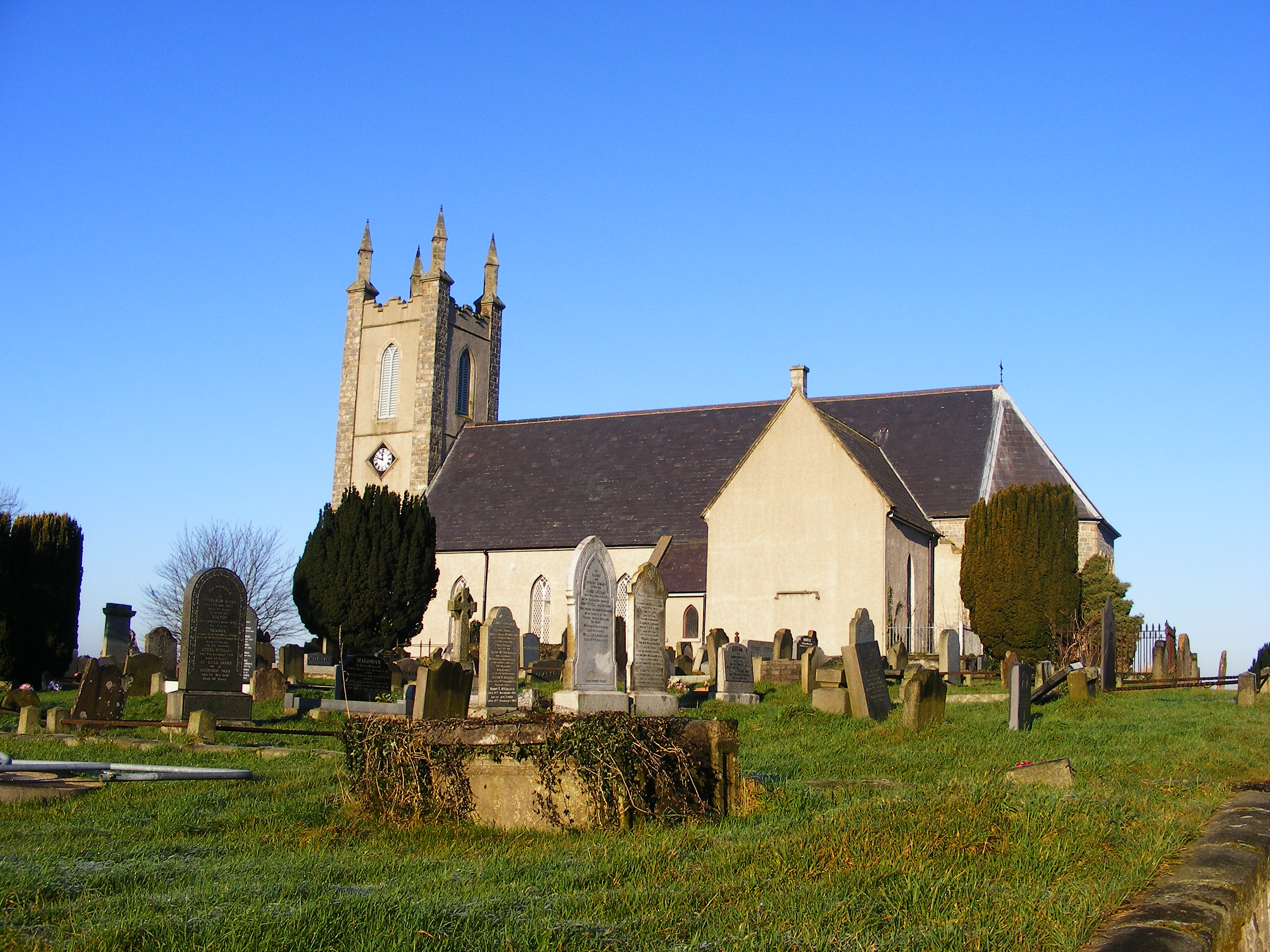

- Location: 25 Church Street, Newry
- Country: Northern Ireland
- Denomination: Church of Ireland
- Website: https://www.churchofireland.org/find-a-church/parish/12560/newry-st-patrick-st-patrick

History
- Status: Active
- Founded: 1578
- Founder: Nicholas Bagenal
- Dedication: Saint Patrick

Architecture
- Architect(s): Thomas Drew; Welland and Gillespie
- Style: Vernacular

Specifications
- Materials: Granite

Administration
- Province: Armagh
- Diocese: Down and Dromore
- Parish: St Patrick's

Clergy
- Rector: Revd Capt Scott McDonald

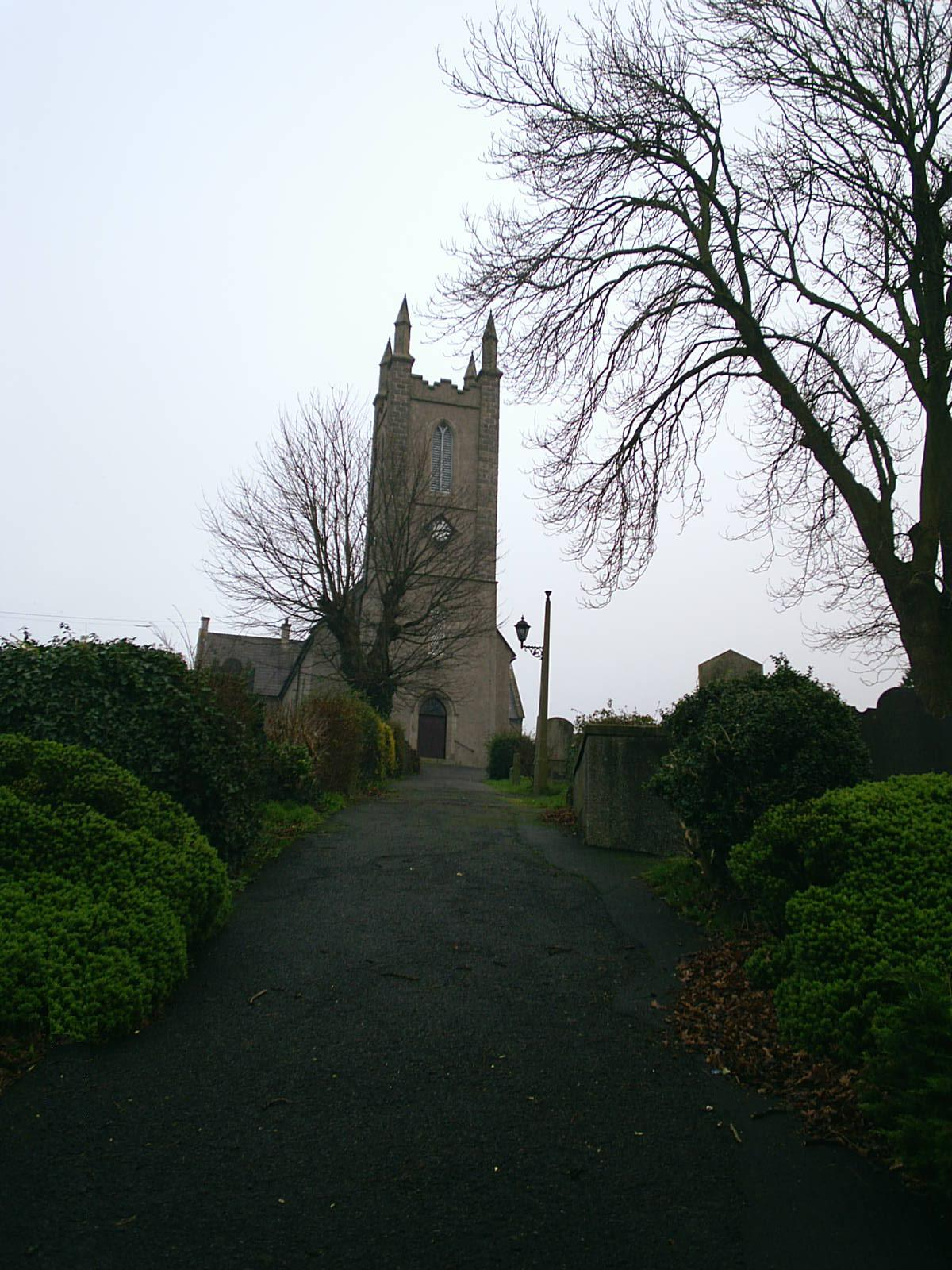
Saint Patrick's Church, Newry from the Western entrance

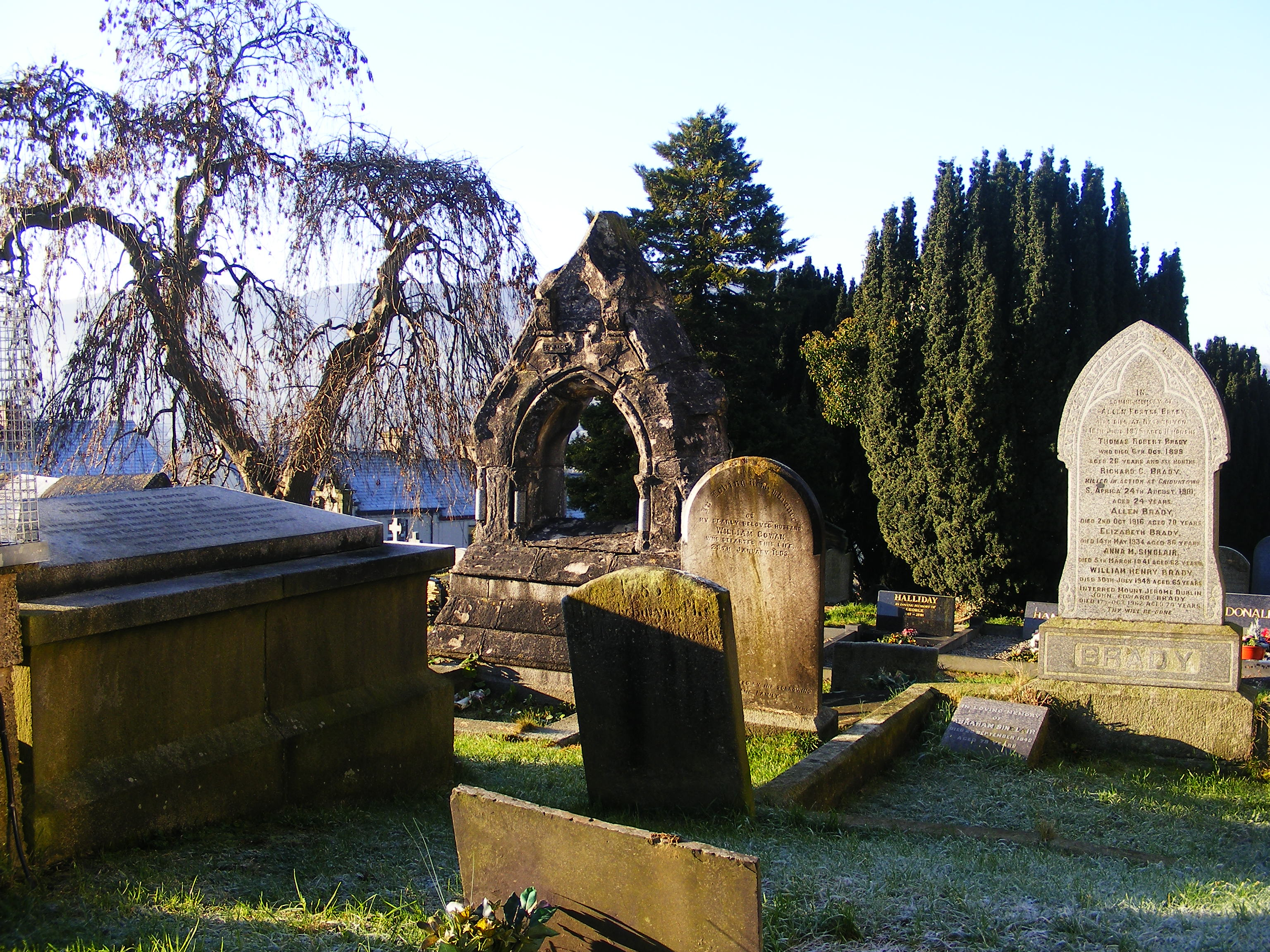
Some gravestones

Saint Patrick's Church is a Church of Ireland church in Newry, County Down, Northern Ireland. The church is believed to have been built in 1578 on the instructions of Nicholas Bagenal, who was granted the monastery lands by Edward VI, and is considered to be the first Protestant church in Ireland. The church was, however, rebuilt in its current form in 1866. The church is of granite and sits on a hill on Church Street on the east side of the city and occupies a commanding position overlooking the city centre.

The church is notable for its unusual spire – consisting of a small steeple at each corner of the clock tower. This may have prompted Jonathan Swift, on his first visit to the town, to issue the following comment on Newry: 'High Church, Low Steeple; Dirty Streets, Proud People'.

The church was listed "B+" in 1976.
