= John McClellan =

John McClellan may refer to:

- John McClellan (chemist) (1810–1881), chemist and industrialist in Widnes, England
- John J. McClellan (1874–1925), chief organist in the Salt Lake Tabernacle of The Church of Jesus Christ of Latter-day Saints, 1900–1925
- John L. McClellan (1896–1977), United States Representative and Senator from Arkansas

== See also ==
- John McLellan (disambiguation)
- John McClelland (disambiguation)
