= Newry Town Hall =

Municipal Building in Newry, Northern Ireland

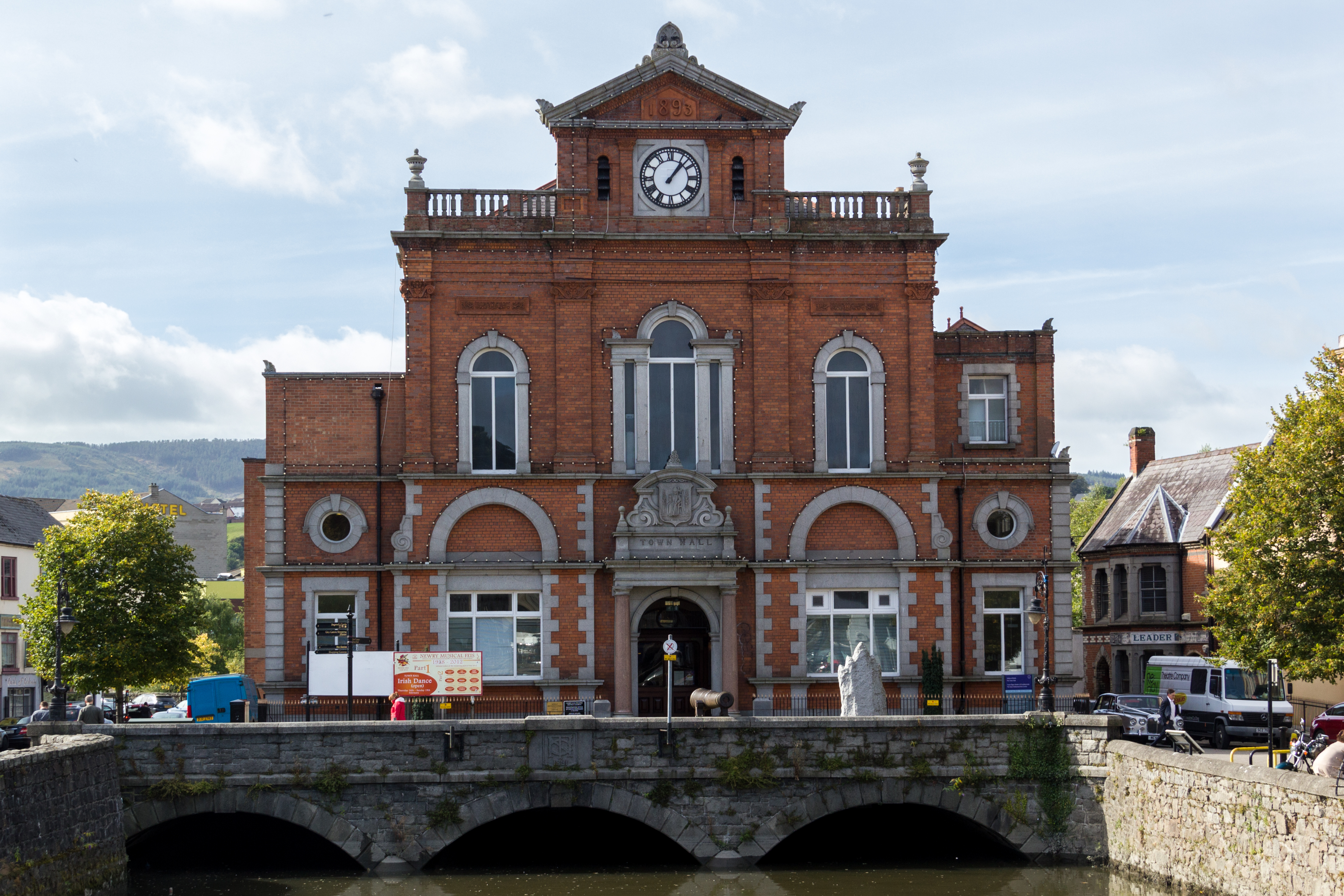
- Newry Town Hall

- Shown in Northern Ireland
- 54.1775°N 6.3376°W
- Location: Bank Parade, Newry

History
- Built: 1894

Site notes
- Architect: William Batt
- Architectural style: Neoclassical style

Listed Building – Grade B1
- Official name: Town Hall, Bank Parade, Newry, County Down
- Designated: 15 December 1981
- Reference no.: HB 16/28/018 B

Newry Town Hall is a municipal structure in Bank Parade in Newry, Northern Ireland. It was built on a specially-constructed bridge across the Newry River, which forms part of the historic border between County Armagh and County Down. The town hall, which was the headquarters of Newry Urban District Council, is a Grade B1 listed building.

== History ==
Until the late 19th century the town commissioners in Newry held their meetings in offices at Marcus Square. After finding this arrangement inadequate, the commissioners decided to procure a purpose-built town hall: the site they selected was on the historic border between County Armagh and County Down. A design competition was assessed by Thomas Drew and won by William Batt. The new building was designed in the neoclassical style, built in red brick with stone dressings by a local contractor, David Mahood, and was officially opened by the former local member of parliament, the Earl of Kilmorey, in March 1894.

The design required a new three-arched bridge to be constructed to take the weight of the new building. The design of the building involved a symmetrical main frontage with five bays facing onto Bank Parade; the central section of three bays, which slightly projected forward, featured an arched doorway flanked by Doric order columns supporting an entablature inscribed with the words "Town Hall", above which there was an open pediment containing a large cartouche with the town's coat of arms. On the first floor, there was a Venetian window flanked by pilasters and, at roof level, there was a central gable containing a clock topped with a pediment which contained a terracotta panel inscribed with the year "1893" in the tympanum. The outer bays of the central section featured round headed windows flanked by pilasters on the first floor and there was a balustrade with corner urns at roof level. Internally, the principal room was the council chamber.

The area was advanced to the status of urban district with the town hall as its headquarters in 1899. A Russian cannon which had seen action in the Crimean War was moved to its present location outside the town hall in 1938. A war memorial was installed on the site vacated by the Russian cannon, on the north bank of the river, in 1939. The town hall continued to serve as the meeting place of Newry Urban District Council for much of the 20th century but ceased to be the local seat of government when the enlarged Newry and Mourne District Council was established in new offices at Monaghan Row shortly after it was formed in 1973. The British Army defused a 100 pounds (45 kg) car bomb outside the town hall in November 1976.

The building continued to be used as an events venue and performers included the rock band U2 in February 1980. A large stone monolith intended to commemorate the achievement of the mountaineer, Terence Bannon, as the second person from Northern Ireland to reach the summit of Mount Everest, was unveiled by the mayor of Newry, Councillor Jack Patterson, outside the town hall on 28 May 2004. A programme of refurbishment works as well as some improvement works to make the venue better equipped for theatre and concert performances was completed in January 2018.

Works of art in the town hall include a bust by the sculptor, John Swynnerton, of the former Lord Chief Justice of England, Lord Russell of Killowen, who was born in Newry.
