= Bagenal's Castle =

Fortified house in County Down, Northern Ireland

- Caisleán Bagenal (Irish)
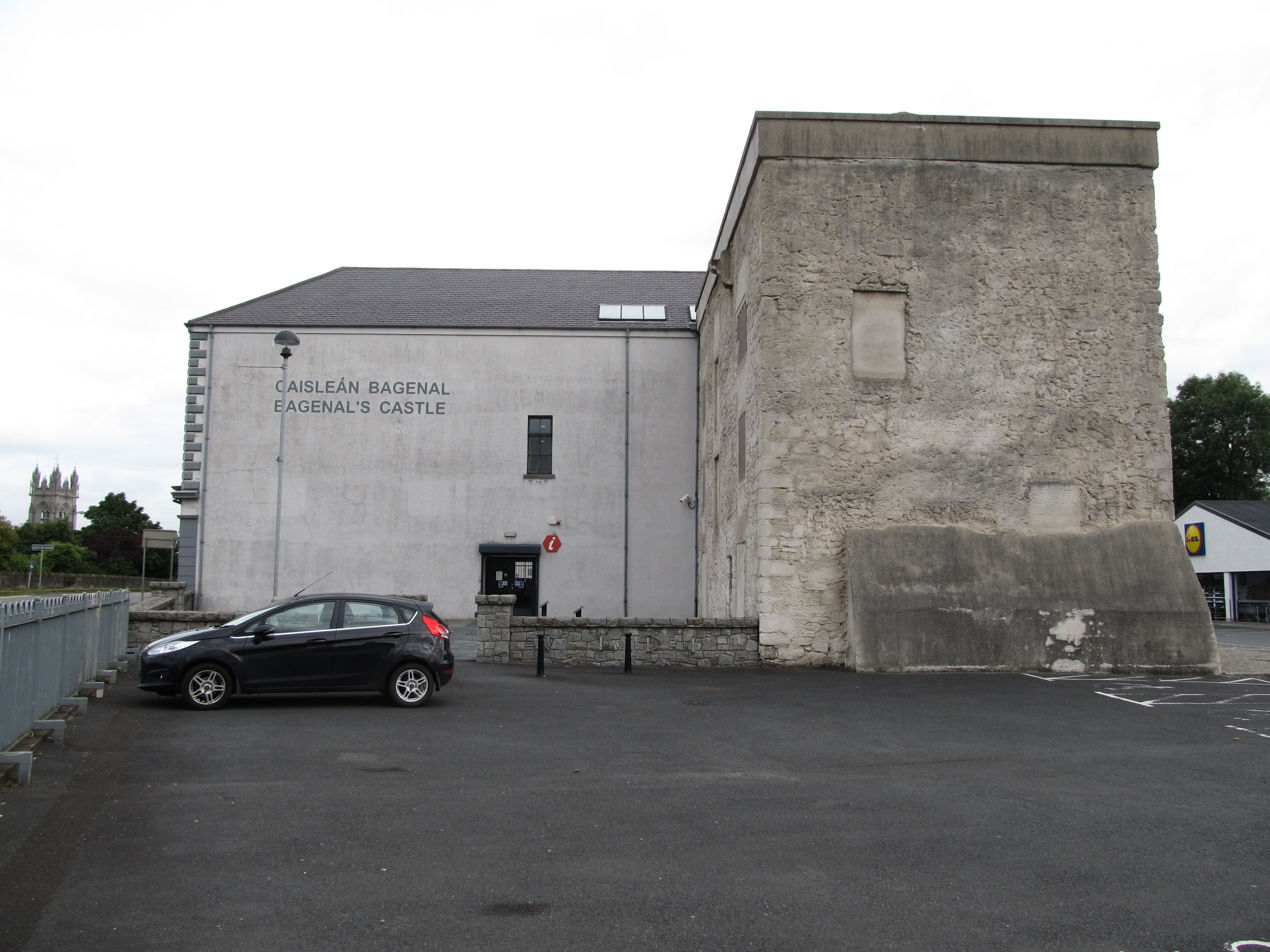
- Bagenal's Castle in August 2016

- Location within Northern Ireland
- 54°10′22.8″N 6°20′9.6″W
- Location: Newry, County Down, Northern Ireland

History
- Built: c. 1568
- Original use: Residence for Sir Nicholas Bagenal and his family

Site notes
- Architect: Sir Nicholas Bagenal (1568)
- Restored: c. 2007
- Website: www.bagenalscastle.com

Bagenal's Castle (Irish: Caisleán Bagenal) is a 16th-century fortified house located in Newry, County Down, Northern Ireland. It was rediscovered in 1996, where it was found located in the premises of the former McCann's Bakery. The castle consists of a rectangular plan with three storeys and was made with granite. During its restoration, sandstone was used as the replacement material.

== History ==
=== Construction ===
Bagenal's Castle was built in 1568 in the area of a 12th-century Cistercian abbey by Sir Nicholas Bagenal, who was granted ownership of the abbey by King Edward VI in 1552.

=== Remodelling ===
The castle's appearance changed between the 18th and 19th century when the staircase tower was demolished around 1760 as the castle was being remodelled as a residence and when a warehouse was built next to the castle around 1830. The Ordnance Survey memoirs from the 1830s mention the castle was occupied as two houses and that fragments of carved stones from it were reused for surrounding buildings.

The castle was mostly forgotten by the 1830s as it was not included in the Ordnance Survey maps. The Archaeological Survey of County Down stated that the castle has long since been destroyed, despite knowledge of its history being passed through several generations.

The castle was bought in 1894 and converted into a bakery. In 1947, human bones were found while new ovens were being installed in the back of the castle. The many alterations had hidden the origins of the castle, making the only evidence the stone carvings that were preserved on the bakery's walls.

=== Restoration ===
After McCann's Bakery was sold, the castle was rediscovered by a team of historians in 1996 during the bakery's demolition. The Newry and Mourne District Council then made a decision to acquire the site. The castle was then scheduled for restoration by the Northern Ireland Environment Agency, who then entered into negotiations with the owners to see how they could accommodate it.

Excavations of the site began around December 2000 and April 2003. The excavations revealed a series of stone steps that appeared to lead to a basement and the dividing wall seen on the 1568 ground floor plan.

In March 2004, a project to restore the castle was planned by archaeologists and managed by Kevin Baird, who hoped to restore the castle and the connecting warehouse. The project cost £2.3m in total, with £1.5m being donated by the Heritage Lottery Fund. The project began in Summer 2005, and finished around 2007. Most of the castle's original features were restored, and the castle is now home to a museum. The castle was opened to the public on 27 March 2007.
