= John McLellan =

John McLellan may refer to:

- John McLellan (ice hockey) (1928–1979), Canadian ice hockey player and coach
- John McLellan (journalist)
- John McLellan (songwriter)
- John McLellan (footballer)

== See also ==
- John MacLellan, politician from Alberta, Canada
- John McClellan (disambiguation)
- John McClelland (disambiguation)
