= 1985 Newry mortar attack =

IRA attack in Northern Ireland

- Part of the Troubles
- Location: 54°10′42″N 6°20′29″W; Newry, Northern Ireland
- Date: 28 February 1985; 18:32 (GMT)
- Target: RUC station
- Attack type: Mortar
- Deaths: 9
- Injuries: 37
- Perpetrator: Provisional IRA

On 28 February 1985, the Provisional IRA launched a mortar attack on the Royal Ulster Constabulary (RUC) base at Corry Square in Newry, County Down, Northern Ireland. The attack killed nine RUC officers and injured almost 40 others; the highest death toll ever suffered by the RUC. Afterwards, a major building scheme was begun to give police and military bases better protection from such attacks.

== Background ==
In the early 1970s, after the onset of the Troubles, the Provisional IRA launched a campaign aimed at forcing the British to withdraw from Northern Ireland.

The IRA, particularly its South Armagh Brigade, had repeatedly attacked the British Army and RUC with home-made mortars, but with limited success. Between 1973 and early 1978 a total of 71 mortar attacks were recorded, but none caused direct British Army or RUC deaths. There were only two deadly mortar attacks before 1985. The first was on 19 March 1979, when Private Peter Woolmore of the Queen's Regiment was killed in a mortar attack on Newtownhamilton British Army base. The second was on 12 November 1983, when an RUC officer was killed and several hurt in a mortar attack on Carrickmore RUC base.

== Attack ==
The attack was jointly planned by members of the South Armagh Brigade and an IRA unit in Newry. The home-made mortar launcher, dubbed the 'Mark 10', was bolted on to the back of a Ford lorry that had been hijacked in Crossmaglen. Shortly after 6.30 pm on 28 February, nine shells were launched from the lorry, which had been parked on Monaghan Street, about 250 yards (230 m) from the base. At least one 50 lb (23 kg) shell landed on a portacabin containing a canteen, where many officers were having their evening tea break. Nine police officers were killed and 37 people hurt, including 25 civilian police employees; the highest death toll inflicted on the RUC in its history. The nine dead officers ranged in age from 19 to 41, seven male and two female, seven Protestants and two Catholics. Another shell hit the observation tower, while the rest landed inside and outside the perimeter of the base.

== Aftermath ==
The Prime Minister, Margaret Thatcher, called the attack "barbaric", while the Republic of Ireland's Taoiseach, Garret FitzGerald, said it was "cruel and cynical", and pledged the help of the Irish security forces to catch those responsible. Although not involved in the attack, Newry IRA member Eamon Collins was arrested shortly afterwards and interrogated. After five days of questioning, Collins broke under interrogation and turned supergrass, leading to more than a dozen arrests of other IRA members. The attack prompted calls from unionist politicians to "increase security", and the British government began an expensive programme of construction to protect bases from similar attacks. This involved installing reinforced roofs and building blast-deflecting walls around the base of buildings.

After the success in Newry, the IRA carried out nine more mortar attacks in 1985. On 4 September, an RUC training centre in Enniskillen was attacked and 30 cadets narrowly escaped death due to poor intelligence-gathering by the IRA unit responsible. The cadets were expected to be in bed sleeping, but were instead eating breakfast when the bombs landed. In November 1986, the IRA launched another attack on the RUC base in Newry, but the bombs fell short of their target and landed on houses. A four-year-old Catholic girl was badly wounded and another 38 people were hurt, prompting the IRA to admit that "this incident left us open to justified criticism".

Beginning in the 1990s, operations at the Corry Square base were progressively shifted to a new base on the outskirts of Newry. The base was closed in 2002 and a park occupies the site today.

== See also ==
- Downing Street mortar attack
- Osnabrück mortar attack
- Attack on Ballygawley barracks
- Chronology of Provisional Irish Republican Army actions
- The Troubles in Newry
