= Newry, Indiana =

Unincorporated community in Indiana, U.S.

Coordinates: 38°54′17″N 85°49′20″W

Location of Newry within the state of Indiana.

Newry was an early town in Jackson County, Indiana, in the United States.

== History ==
Newry was never legally platted. A post office was established at Newry in 1846, and remained in operation until it was discontinued in 1860. One of the first mills in Vernon Township was built in Newry.
