= Terence Bannon =

Irish mountaineer and adventurer (born 1967)

Terence "Banjo" Bannon
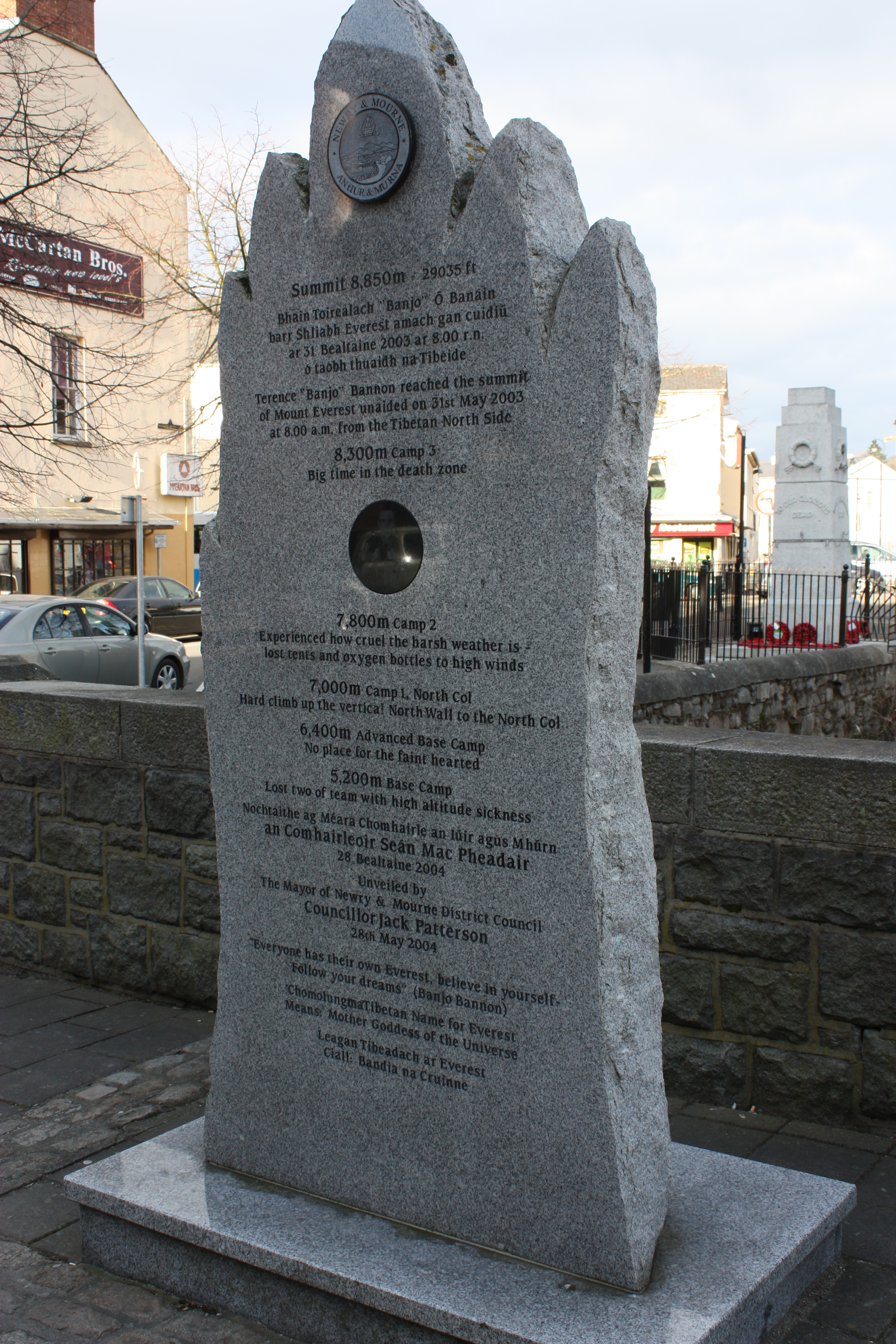
- Born: Newry, County Down, Northern Ireland
- Other names: Banjo

Terence 'Banjo' Bannon, born 24 November 1967 in Newry, County Down, Northern Ireland is a mountaineer and adventurer. Bannon became the second person from Northern Ireland to reach the summit of Mount Everest on 31 May 2003. In 2006 he attempted to climb K2; however the attempt was aborted after the deaths of a number of the expedition members.

Terence is a serving firefighter for the Northern Ireland Fire and Rescue Service and has a connection to the McClelland family.

== Monument ==
A large stone monolith intended to commemorate Bannon's feat was unveiled by the mayor of Newry, Councillor Jack Patterson, outside Newry Town Hall on 28 May 2004.

== Book ==
Bannon and his wife, Lauren O'Malley, wrote Ascending the Dream: The Life and Climbs of Banjo Bannon.
