= St Mary's High School, Newry =

Coordinates: 54.0954°N 6.1941°W

St. Mary's High School, Newry
- Upper Chapel Street, Newry, County Down, BT34 2DT; Northern Ireland

Information
- Type: Maintained Secondary
- Religious affiliation: Roman Catholic
- Established: 1961
- Local authority: Education Authority(Southern)
- Principal: Denise Crawley
- Gender: Female
- Age: 11 to 18
- Enrolment: 800
- Colours: Maroon, Pink
- Website: https://www.stmarysnewry.com/

St. Mary's High School is located in Newry, County Down, Northern Ireland. It is within the Education Authority (Southern) area.

== History ==
The school was established in 1961.

== Notable alumni ==
- Sinéad Bradley, (b. 1972) - politician
