= Monastic settlement =

Monastic settlements are areas built up in and around the development of monasteries with the spread of Christianity. To understand Christian monastic settlements, we must understand a brief history of Christian monasticism. Monasticism was a movement especially associated with Early Christianity that began in the late 3rd century to the 4th century in Egypt when early Christians realizing that martyrdom wasn’t much of an option when the Roman empire relaxed Christian persecutions. It was begun by key monks who were known then as “The Desert Fathers” and later, there were female monasteries run by women who later came to be known as “The Desert Mothers”. The most famous Desert Father was Abba Anthony and the most famous Desert Mother was Amma Syncletica.ost of the Christians took to the deserts and arid areas to deny themselves of the social environments and people in order to focus on God and prayer. They denied themselves of a comfortable life often resorting to eating what grew in the deserts as well as living frugally and in poverty. With time, monasticism came to impact the church and even the papacy and there came about two variants of monasticism: The Eastern Monastic movement and the Western Monastic movement. Inspired by the Eastern monastic movements, new monastic movements sprung up in western Europe after the Roman empire fell apart and newer kingdoms like the Franks, Britannia and Germanic tribes sprung up. The papacy was at its infancy and places like the Isles of Britannia had monks that established monasteries along its coastlines. One of the forerunners was St. Augustine whose Rule became encoded in the future doctrine of the Roman clergy of the church.

These settlements are of historic interest as the development of a monastery typically spurred other settlement developments over many hundreds of years which may be rich in historical artifacts enabling understanding of social orders and the spread of culture and technologies. For instance, there were monastic settlements (e.g. Wadi al-Natrun), which developed a kind of council, which adopted the responsibility of communication between the monastery and the world. There are also settlements that performed specialized tasks such as the preservation of religious texts as demonstrated by a distinctive literature called apophthegmata (sayings) recorded and preserved by men and women living in the community around Nitria. Celtic Christianity also had the so-called "double-monasteries", where men and women could live within the same monastic settlement, spawning a community settled by supporters, which was governed by unique rules and intentions, particularly concerning gender relations and spiritual equality.
