= Newry River =

River in Northern Ireland

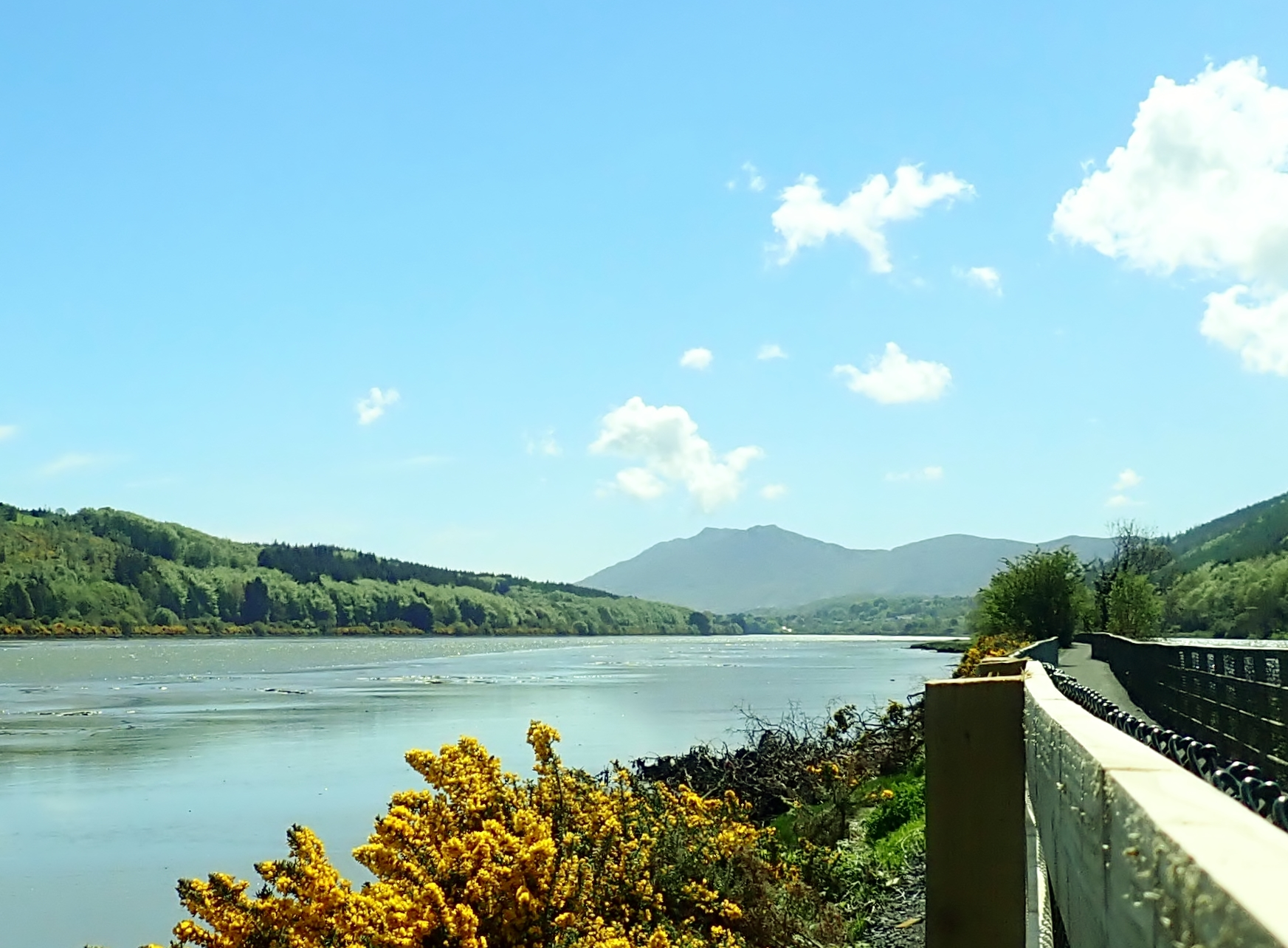
- The estuary of the Newry River

- Native name: An Iúraigh (Irish); Clanrye Wattèr (Scots)

Location
- Sovereign State: United Kingdom
- Constituent Country: Northern Ireland

Physical characteristics
- Source
  - location: Sheepbridge, County Down
  - coordinates: 54°06′00″N 6°16′00″W
- Mouth
  - location: Carlingford Lough at Warrenpoint
  - coordinates: 54.0988°N 6.2490°W
- Length: 25 km (16 mi)
- Basin size: 323 km^{2} (125 sq mi)

Basin features
- Tributaries
  - left: Jerretspass River (joins to form the Newry River), Derrybeg River and its tributaries, Commons Stream and its tributaries, Bessbrook River (via Newry Canal and side weir)
  - right: Damolly Drain, Downshire Stream, Sandy’s Street Stream, Glen River and its tributaries, Knox Peebles Stream

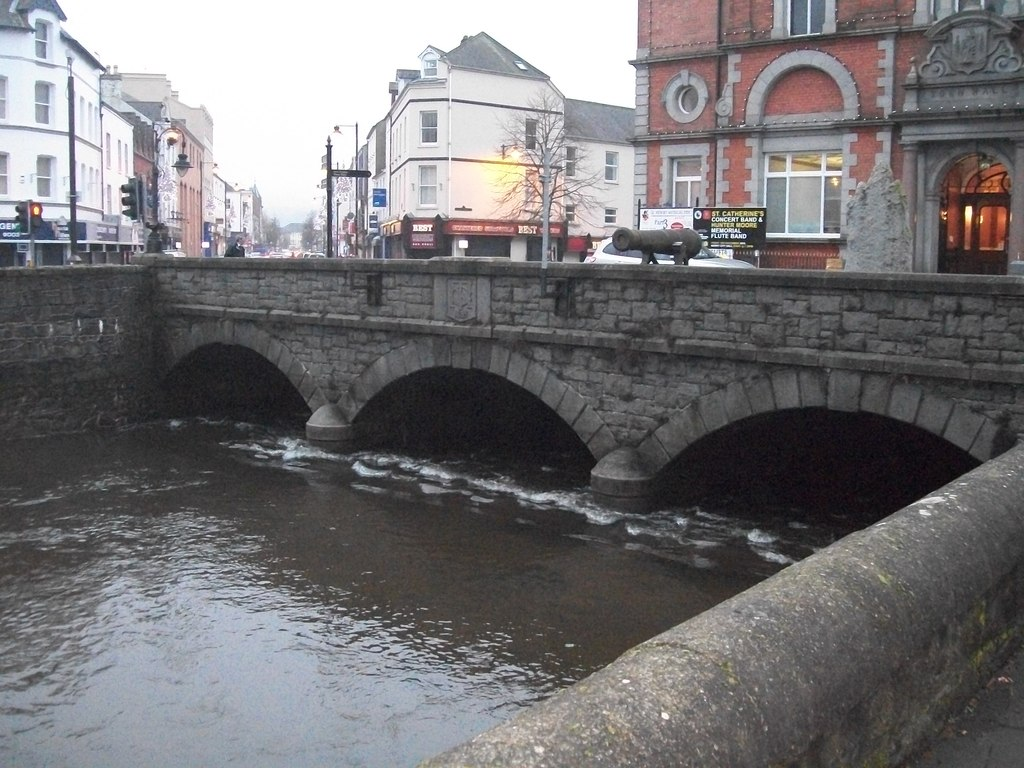
The Clanrye disappearing beneath Newry Town Hall

Newry River (Irish: An Rí; Ulster-Scots: Clanrye Wattèr), also known as the River Clanrye, is a river in Northern Ireland, flowing through counties Down and Armagh. The river passes through the city of Newry and empties into Carlingford Lough near Warrenpoint.

== Course ==
The river, which runs through Newry, forms the historic border between County Armagh and County Down. Some maps call the portion downstream from Newry to the Lough the 'Newry River' and the portion upstream of Newry the 'Clanrye' (as it curls around to its sources in the foothills of the Mourne Mountains), but not all sources make this distinction. According to local tradition, however, the entire waterway is known as the Clanrye River.

While the Newry River flows under the Newry Town Hall, according to the Ordnance Survey of Northern Ireland, the Clanrye breaks away from the Newry River near Drummillar. The Clanrye then progresses under the main A1 road at Sheepbridge and onward toward the Mayobridge Road at the Crown Bridges and Ashtree Cottages.

Beyond Newry, the river flows south-east, past Narrow Water Castle, where it enters Carlingford Lough at Warrenpoint.

== Names ==
=== Clanrye River ===
The word 'Clanrye' comes from the Irish Gleann Rí meaning King's Valley.

=== Newry River and Saint Patrick ===
During one of Saint Patrick's exploratory missions to Ireland he was said to have set up camp on a sandy stretch of the Clanrye River. Whilst settling himself there he decided to plant a yew tree symbolising Ireland's growing and strengthening faith. It is this story which gave Newry its name, Iúr Cinn Trá: the yew tree at the head of the strand (although this part of the riverbank does not resemble a beach today). A monastery, later replaced in 1144 by a Cistercian Abbey, grew up around this yew, with the associated city, An tIúr (simply 'The Yew Tree'), and by anglicisation, Newry, arising around the monastery, and the river, thereafter. An image of a seated St Patrick beside a yew tree by the Clanrye River remains the crest of several local organisations including Newry City A.F.C. and the local Newry Reporter newspaper.

== Bridges ==
The Clanrye River was initially crossed by fords, with the earliest recorded incident occurring in 1178 when English soldiers drowned during a battle. A castle was subsequently built by John de Courcy to secure the river crossing. By the mid-17th century, a bridge was likely in place, referenced during the Irish Rebellion of 1641. A wooden bridge was described in 1673 by French traveller Albert Jouvin de Rochefort, and by the late 17th century, it played a role in military movements during the Williamite War in Ireland. The 18th century saw significant development, including the construction of stone bridges such as the Mudda Murphy Bridge and others associated with the Newry Canal, completed in 1742.

== See also ==
- List of rivers of Ireland
