= The Troubles in Newry =

Incidents in Newry, Northern Ireland during the Troubles

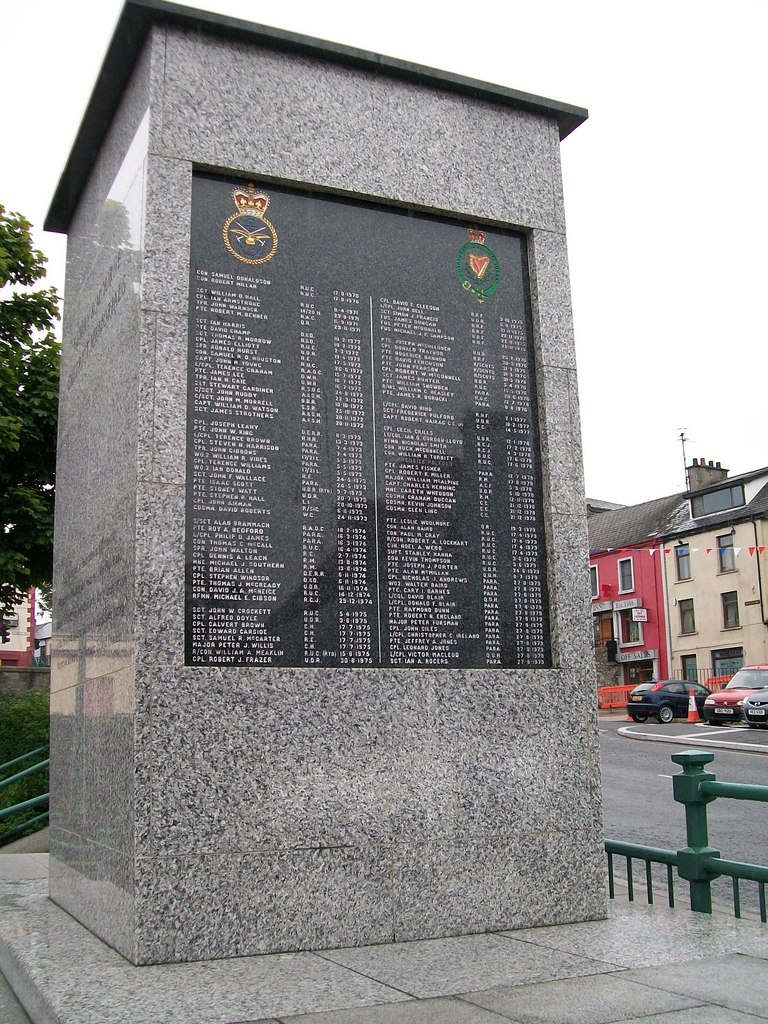
Memorial in Kilkeel to members of the RUC and UK armed forces killed in the Newry and Mourne District during the Troubles.

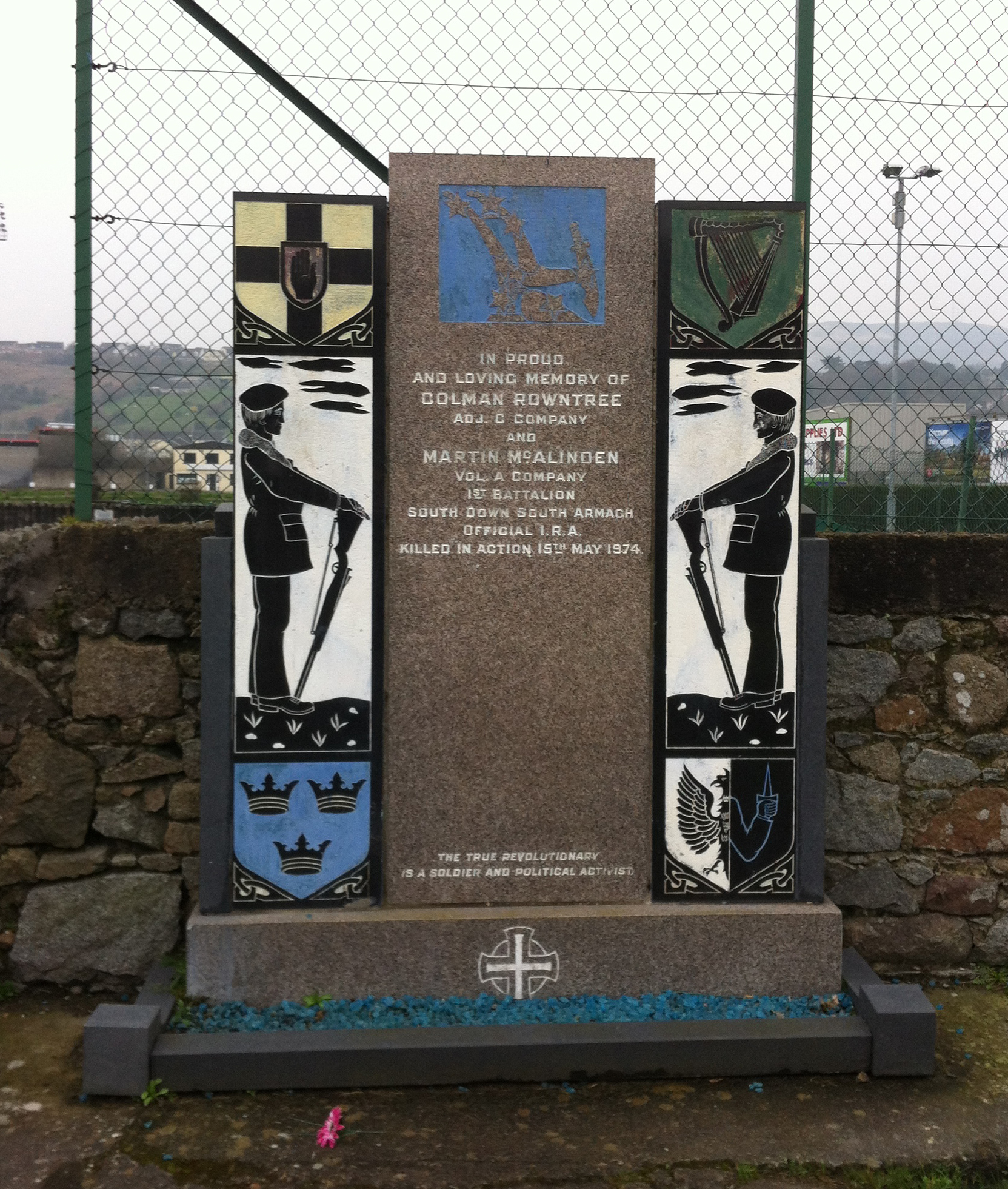
Graves of Martin McAlinden and Colman Rowntree (Official IRA), shot dead by the Parachute Regiment in 1974.

The Troubles in Newry recounts fatalities during The Troubles in Newry, County Armagh/County Down, Northern Ireland.

From 1971 to 1994, 53 people were killed in Newry during the Troubles: eleven civilians, eight Provisional Irish Republican Army, two Official Irish Republican Army, two British Army, one British Territorial Army, one British Army Cadet Force, four Ulster Defence Regiment, three ex-Ulster Defence Regiment, twenty Royal Ulster Constabulary and one ex-Royal Ulster Constabulary.

Incidents in Newry during the Troubles resulting in fatalities:

== 1971 ==
- 4 September 1971 - John Warnock (18), a member of British Army, killed in an Official Irish Republican Army land mine attack on a mobile patrol passing Derrybeg Park, Newry.
- 23 October 1971 - Sean Ruddy (28), James McLaughlin (26) and Robert Anderson (26), all shot by the British Army, who believed they were robbing a bank.

== 1972 ==
- 29 February 1972 - Thomas Morrow (28), a member of the Royal Ulster Constabulary, shot by Official Irish Republican Army at a factory, Camlough Road, Newry; he died two days later.
- 26 June 1972 - David Houston (22), a member of the Royal Ulster Constabulary, shot by Provisional Irish Republican Army while he grappled with a driver of a parked car on Water Street, Newry.
- 9 August 1972 - Colm Murtagh (18), a member of the Provisional Irish Republican Army, died in premature bomb explosion in a garage on Dublin Road, Newry.
- 22 August 1972 - Joseph Fegan (28), Michael Gilleece (32), Craig Lawrence (33), John McCann (60), Patrick Murphy (45), Francis Quinn (28), all civilians, killed when a bomb, being transported by Provisional Irish Republican Army Patrick Hughes (35), Noel Madden (18), and Oliver Rowntree (22), all of whom were also killed, exploded prematurely at the Customs Office, Newry.
- 10 October 1972 - John Ruddy (50), a member of the Ulster Defence Regiment, shot by Provisional Irish Republican Army, Dromalane Park, Newry.

== 1973 ==
- 28 February 1973 - Kevin Heatley (12), shot dead by the British Army as he sat on a wall chatting with friends, Main Avenue, Derrybeg, Newry.
- 9 July 1973 - Isaac Scott (41), member of the UDR from outside Mayobridge, killed by the Irish Republican Army in Belleek near Newtownhamilton.
- 24 December 1973 - Edward Grant (18) and Brendan Quinn (17), both Provisional Irish Republican Army volunteers, and Aubrey Harshaw (18), a civilian, were killed in a premature bomb explosion at Clarke's Bar, Monaghan Street, Newry.

== 1974 ==
- 15 May 1974 - Martin McAlinden and Colman Rowntree, members of the Official Irish Republican Army, shot dead by the Parachute Regiment in Ballyholland, Newry.
- 27 August 1974 - Patrick McKeown (29), member of the Provisional Irish Republican Army, died in premature bomb explosion in house, Barcroft Park, Newry.
- 18 October 1974 - Michael Hughes (16), member of the Provisional Irish Republican Army, shot dead by the British Army, Derrybeg, Newry.
- 16 November 1974 - Thomas McCready (32), Ulster Defence Regiment member, shot by Provisional Irish Republican Army sniper while on mobile patrol in Newry.
- 29 November 1974 - Ulster Volunteer Force (UVF) carried out a bomb attack on Hughes Bar, Church Street, Newry. John Mallon (21), died 15 December 1974 two weeks after being injured in the bomb attack.

== 1977 ==
- 26 February 1977 - Robert Mitchell (68), a Justice of the Peace (JP), shot by Provisional Irish Republican Army, Windsor Avenue, Newry.

== 1978 ==
- 12 January 1978 - Cecil Grills (56), member of the Ulster Defence Regiment, shot by Provisional Irish Republican Army while driving home from work, Talbot Street, Newry.
- 5 September 1978 - William McAlpine (46), a part-time member of British Army Cadet Force, shot by the Provisional Irish Republican Army while driving his car, near to his home, Chapel Street, Newry.
- 29 September 1978 - Joseph Skelly (74), shot by Provisional Irish Republican Army from passing car, while driving through the centre of Newry, County Down; a former member of the RUC in the car with him was the intended target.
- 6 October 1978 - Charles Henning (50), member of Ulster Defence Regiment, died four days after being shot by Provisional Irish Republican Army at a cattle mart, Patrick Street, Newry.

== 1979 ==
- 5 October 1979 - George Hawthorne (37), ex-Ulster Defence Regiment member shot by the Provisional Irish Republican Army while driving his car into car park, Soho Place, Newry.

== 1981 ==
- 31 May 1981 - Michael O'Neill (34), a member of the British Army, killed by a booby trap bomb in an abandoned car, Drumalane Road, Newry.
- 20 June 1981 - Neal Quinn (53), member of the Royal Ulster Constabulary, shot by Provisional Irish Republican Army in Bridge Bar, Newry.

== 1982 ==
- 11 March 1982 - Norman Hanna (28), ex-Ulster Defence Regiment member, shot by the Provisional Irish Republican Army outside the Department of the Environment office, Rathfriland Road, Newry.
- 18 June 1982 - Albert White (60), ex-Royal Ulster Constabulary member, shot by the Provisional Irish Republican Army while driving his car, Balmoral Park, Newry.

== 1983 ==
- 15 March 1983 - Frederick Morton (59), a member of the Royal Ulster Constabulary, shot by Provisional Irish Republican Army during an ambush driving on the Tandragee Road, Newry.
- 10 October 1983 - Sean McShane (39), mistakenly shot by the Provisional Irish Republican Army while in a bookmaker's shop, Monaghan Street, Newry; a RUC member, was the intended target.

== 1984 ==
- 10 January 1984 - William Fullerton (48), a member of the Royal Ulster Constabulary, shot by Provisional Irish Republican Army sniper while driving his car along Warrenpoint Road, Newry.
- 9 May 1984 - Trevor May (28), member of the British Territorial Army, killed by Provisional Irish Republican Army booby trap bomb while travelling in his car shortly after leaving the Telephone Exchange, Downshire Road, Newry.
- 8 August 1984 - Brendan Watters (24), a member of the Provisional Irish Republican Army, died in a premature bomb explosion in a house, Barcroft Park, Newry.

== 1985 ==
- 28 February 1985 - Alexander Donaldson (41), Rosemary McGookin (27), Geoffrey Campbell (24), Sean McHenry (19), David Topping (22), John Dowd (31) Ivy Kelly (29), Denis Price (22), and Paul McFerran (33), members of the Royal Ulster Constabulary, were killed in a Provisional Irish Republican Army mortar bomb attack on Corry Square Police Station.
- 3 April 1985 - Michael Kay (38), a member of the Royal Ulster Constabulary and Kenneth Parry (55), a civilian employed at the Courthouse, were killed by a Provisional Irish Republican Army remote-controlled bomb, hidden in parked car and detonated when a Royal Ulster Constabulary patrol passed, outside the Courthouse, Downshire Road, Newry.

== 1986 ==
- 15 May 1986 - Herbert McConville (61), ex-Ulster Defence Regiment member shot by the Provisional Irish Republican Army, Kilmorey Street, Newry.
- 26 July 1986 - Karl Blackbourne (19), Peter Kilpatrick (27) and Charles Allen (37), all members of the Royal Ulster Constabulary, were shot and killed from close range by the Provisional Irish Republican Army while sitting in their stationary armoured patrol car at Market Street, Newry.

== 1987 ==
- 24 September 1987 - Ian McKeown (37), shot by the Provisional Irish Republican Army in mistaken identity while sitting in his car on Kilmorey Street, Newry.

== 1990 ==
- 15 April 1990 - Eoin Morley (23), a member of the Irish People's Liberation Organisation, was shot by the Provisional Irish Republican Army, Iveagh Crescent, Newry, County Down.

== 1992 ==
- 27 March 1992 - Colleen McMurray (34), a member of the Royal Ulster Constabulary, killed in a Provisional Irish Republican Army horizontal mortar attack on armoured patrol car, Merchants Quay, Newry. Her colleague Paul Slaine, lost both legs; in April 2000 he received the George Cross conferred on the RUC.

== 1993 ==
- 31 October 1993 - Brian Woods (30), a member of the Royal Ulster Constabulary, shot by the Provisional Irish Republican Army sniper, while at Vehicle Check Point (VCP), Upper Edward Street, Newry, died two days later.

== 1994 ==
- 29 April 1994 - Michael Brown (23), alleged informer, from Leitrim, County Down, shot by the Provisional Irish Republican Army and body found by the side of Omeath Road, near Newry.
- 10 November 1994 - Frank Kerr (54), civilian, shot during armed robbery at his workplace, a postal sorting office on Clanrye Street, Newry.

== 1999 ==
- 27 January 1999 - Eamon Collins (45), former member of the PIRA turned informer, who coauthored a book called Killing Rage. He was found beaten and stabbed to death, at the junction of Watsons Road and Dorans Hill, Newry.
