= Newry Reporter =

Northern Irish newspaper

The Newry Reporter was established in 1867 by James Burns and is the oldest newspaper serving the Newry and Mourne region of Northern Ireland.

== History ==
After the death of James Burns in 1902, the paper was sold to Joseph Wright who operated a printing works in Hill Street.

The Wright family owned the paper for seven years before a fire at the facility prompted Wright to move to Canada.

Robert Sands acquired the rights to the paper and began printing again after a four-month stoppage since the fire.

In 1912, the paper moved offices from Clanrye Grain Mills (owned by Sands) to Margaret Street, where it remains to this day.

After Sands' death in 1915, the paper was published by the executors until 1927 when Edward Hodgett bought the rights.

Ownership remained with the Hodgett family until recently.

On Jan. 11, 2023, the paper announced it would cease publication on Jan. 25. However it was subsequently acquired and continues publication under National World.

== Current operations ==
The paper is now published weekly on a Wednesday (though the front cover lists Thursday as the publication date) after trying both bi- & tri-weekly runs throughout its history.

The paper's look and feel had a major refresh in May 2007 when it relaunched as a full colour 'compact'. Today its main competitor in the region is the Newry Democrat. According to ABC figures (Jan-Jun 2013) the Newry Reporter sells 9,842 copies per week, with the Newry Democrat's distribution in the region of 6,000 copies.
