= List of people killed during The Troubles (1969–1998) =

At least 3,489 people were killed during The Troubles in Northern Ireland, Ireland, the United Kingdom, and continental Europe, between 1969 and 1998.

== 1969 ==
Name	Date of death	Age	Religious affiliation	Status	Location of injury	Perpetrator	Notes
Francis McCloskey	14 July 1969	67	Catholic	Civilian	Dungiven, County Londonderry, Northern Ireland	Royal Ulster Constabulary	Died after being hit on the head by a baton during unrest the previous day.
Samuel DeVenney	17 July 1969	42	Catholic	Civilian	William Street, Bogside, Derry, Northern Ireland	Royal Ulster Constabulary	Died after being beaten in his home on April 19, 1969.
John Gallagher	14 August 1969	30	Catholic	Civilian	Cathedral Road, Armagh, County Armagh, Northern Ireland	Ulster Special Constabulary	Shot during 1969 Northern Ireland riots.
Patrick Rooney	14 August 1969	9	Catholic	Civilian	Divis Flats, Belfast, Northern Ireland	Royal Ulster Constabulary	Shot while in his home; The RUC responded to gunfire by firing into nearby flats where they believed shots were fired from during the 1969 Northern Ireland riots.
Herbert Roy	15 August 1969	26	Protestant	Civilian	Corner of Divis and Dover Streets, Lower Falls, Belfast, Northern Ireland	Unknown Republican Rioter	Shot during 1969 Northern Ireland riots.
Hugh McCabe	15 August 1969	20	Catholic	British Army (on leave)	Whitehall Block, Divis Flats, Belfast, Northern Ireland	Royal Ulster Constabulary	Shot by police marksmen on roof, where rioters had gathered during 1969 Northern Ireland riots.
Samuel McLarnon	15 August 1969	27	Catholic	Civilian	Herbert Street, Ardoyne, Belfast, Northern Ireland	Royal Ulster Constabulary	Shot during 1969 Northern Ireland riots.
Michael Lynch	15 August 1969	28	Catholic	Civilian	Butler Street, Ardoyne, Belfast, Northern Ireland	Royal Ulster Constabulary	Shot during 1969 Northern Ireland riots.
Gerald McAuley	15 August 1969	15	Catholic	Fianna Éireann	Bombay Street, Falls, Belfast, Northern Ireland	Unknown Loyalist Rioter	Shot during 1969 Northern Ireland riots.
David Linton	15 August 1969	48	Protestant	Civilian	Junction of Palmer Street and Crumlin Road, Belfast, Northern Ireland	Unknown Republican Rioter	Shot during 1969 Northern Ireland riots.
John Todd	8 September 1969	29	Protestant	Civilian	Alloa Street, Lower Oldpark, Belfast, Northern Ireland	Unknown Republican Rioter	Shot during unrest.
George Dickie	11 October 1969	25	Protestant	Civilian	Shankill Road and Downing Street, Belfast, Northern Ireland	British Army	Shot during unrest.
Herbert Hawe	11 October 1969	32	Protestant	Civilian	Hopeton Street, Shankill, Belfast, Northern Ireland	British Army	Shot during unrest.
Victor Arbuckle	11 October 1969	29	Protestant	Royal Ulster Constabulary	Shankill Road, Belfast, Northern Ireland	Unknown Loyalist Rioter	Shot during unrest.
Thomas McDowell	21 October 1969	45	Protestant	Ulster Volunteer Force	Hydroelectric power station near Ballyshannon, County Donegal, Ireland	Ulster Volunteer Force	Died 2 days after being injured by premature explosion at hydroelectric power station.
Patrick Corry	1 December 1969	61	Catholic	Civilian	Unity Flats, off Upper Library Street, Belfast, Northern Ireland	Royal Ulster Constabulary	Died after being hit with a baton on 2 August 1969.

== 1970 ==
Name	Date of death	Age	Religious affiliation	Status	Location of injury	Perpetrator	Notes
Richard Fallon	3 April 1970	42	Unknown	Garda Síochána	Bank of Ireland, Arran Quay, Dublin, Ireland	Saor Éire	Police officer killed during armed robbery by Republican group.
Thomas McCool	26 June 1970	40	Catholic	Provisional Irish Republican Army	Dunree Gardens, Creggan, Derry, Northern Ireland	Provisional Irish Republican Army	Killed during premature explosion of incendiary device.
Bernadette McCool	26 June 1970	9	Catholic	Civilian	Dunree Gardens, Creggan, Derry, Northern Ireland	Provisional Irish Republican Army	Killed during premature explosion of incendiary device.
Carol Ann McCool	26 June 1970	4	Catholic	Civilian	Dunree Gardens, Creggan, Derry, Northern Ireland	Provisional Irish Republican Army	Killed during premature explosion of incendiary device.
Joseph Coyle	26 June 1970	40	Catholic	Provisional Irish Republican Army	Dunree Gardens, Creggan, Derry, Northern Ireland	Provisional Irish Republican Army	Killed during premature explosion of incendiary device.
William Kincaid	27 June 1970	28	Protestant	Civilian	Disraeli Street, off Crumlin Road, Belfast, Northern Ireland	Provisional Irish Republican Army	Riot after Orange Order march turns into gun battle.
Daniel Loughins	27 June 1970	32	Protestant	Civilian	Palmer Street, off Crumlin Road, Belfast, Northern Ireland	Provisional Irish Republican Army	Riot after Orange Order march turns into gun battle.
William Kincaid	27 June 1970	18	Protestant	Civilian	Disraeli Street, off Crumlin Road, Belfast, Northern Ireland	Provisional Irish Republican Army	Riot after Orange Order march turns into gun battle.
Robert Neill	27 June 1970	38	Protestant	Civilian	Junction of Central Street and Newtownards Road, Belfast	Provisional Irish Republican Army	Shot during Battle of St Matthew's.
James McCurrie	27 June 1970	34	Protestant	Civilian	Beechfield Street, Short Strand, Belfast	Provisional Irish Republican Army	Shot during Battle of St Matthew's.
Henry McIlhone	29 June 1970	33	Catholic	Civilian	Grounds of St Matthew's Church, Short Strand, Belfast	Provisional Irish Republican Army	Died 2 days after being shot during Battle of St Matthew's.
Thomas Reid	3 July 1970	46	Protestant	Civilian	Springfield Road, Belfast	Unknown	Died 6 days after being hit on the head by missile thrown from a crowd during street disturbances.
Charles O'Neill	3 July 1970	36	Catholic	Civilian	Falls Road, Lower Falls, Belfast	British Army	Knocked down by Armoured Personnel Carrier during Falls Curfew.
William Burns	3 July 1970	54	Catholic	Civilian	Falls Road, Lower Falls, Belfast	British Army	Shot at front door of his home during Falls Curfew.
Zbigniew Uglik	4 July 1970	23	Unknown	Civilian	Albert Street, Lower Falls, Belfast	British Army	English visitor of Polish heritage shot at the rear of a house during Falls Curfew.
Thomas Carlin	8 July 1970	55	Catholic	Provisional Irish Republican Army	Dunree Gardens, Creggan, Derry, Northern Ireland	Provisional Irish Republican Army	Killed during premature explosion of incendiary device on 26 June 1970.
Patrick Elliman	10 July 1970	62	Catholic	Civilian	Marchioness Street, Lower Falls, Belfast	British Army	Died a week after he walked to the end of the street in his night clothes for a "breath of fresh air" before being shot and taken away in an ambulance during Falls Curfew. It was searched and re-routed by the British Army, causing it to take thirty minutes to reach the Royal Victoria Hospital a few hundred yards away.
Daniel O'Hagan	31 July 1970	19	Catholic	Civilian	New Lodge Road, Belfast	British Army	Shot during unrest.
Donaldson Samuel	12 August 1970	23	Protestant	Royal Ulster Constabulary	Lissaraw, near Crossmaglen, County Armagh, Northern Ireland	Provisional Irish Republican Army	Died one day after being injured by booby trap bomb attached to abandoned car. See: 1970 Crossmaglen bombing.
Robert Millar	12 August 1970	26	Protestant	Royal Ulster Constabulary	Lissaraw, near Crossmaglen, County Armagh, Northern Ireland	Provisional Irish Republican Army	Died one day after being injured by booby trap bomb attached to abandoned car. See: 1970 Crossmaglen bombing.
Michael Kane	4 September 1970	35	Catholic	Provisional Irish Republican Army	Electricity transformer, New Forge Lane, Malone, Belfast	Provisional Irish Republican Army	Killed during premature explosion.
David Murray	30 September 1970	49	Protestant	Civilian	Wilton Street, Shankill, Belfast	Non-specific Loyalist group	Shot at his home.
Liam Walsh	13 October 1970	35	Unknown	Saor Éire	Rear of McKee Irish Army base, off Blackhorse Avenue, Dublin, Ireland	Saor Éire	Died in premature bomb explosion on railway embankment.
Arthur McKenna	16 November 1970	35	Catholic	Civilian	Ballymurphy Road, Ballymurphy, Belfast	Provisional Irish Republican Army	Shot while repairing car. Alleged a criminal.
Alexander McVicker	16 November 1970	35	Catholic	Civilian	Ballymurphy Road, Ballymurphy, Belfast	Provisional Irish Republican Army	Shot while repairing car. Allegedly a criminal.
Andrew Jardin	23 December 1970	65	Protestant	Civilian	White Gables, Hannahstown, Belfast	Unknown	Shot at his home

== 1971 ==
Name	Date of death	Age	Religious affiliation	Status	Location of injury	Perpetrator	Notes
John Kavanagh	27 January 1971	28	Catholic	Civilian	Blackstaff River, off Roden Street, Belfast, Northern Ireland	Provisional Irish Republican Army	Found Shot
Bernard Watt	06 February 1971	28	Catholic	Civilian	Chatham Street, Ardoyne, Belfast	British Army	Shot during street disturbances
James Saunders	06 February 1971	22	Catholic	Provisional Irish Republican Army	Louisa Street, off Oldpark Road, Belfast, Northern Ireland	British Army	Shot during gun battle
Robert Curtis	06 February 1971	20	Unknown	British Army	New Lodge Road, Belfast, Northern Ireland	Provisional Irish Republican Army	Shot by sniper while on foot patrol
Albert Bell	07 February 1971	25	Protestant	Civilian	Belfast to Crumlin Road, Ballyhill, near Belfast, Northern Ireland	Unknown	Found shot by side of road
John Eakins	09 February 1971	52	Protestant	Civilian	Brougher Mountain, near Trillick, County Tyrone, Northern Ireland	Provisional Irish Republican Army	Killed while travelling in Landrover, which detonated landmine on track. British Army mobile patrol intended target
Harry Edgar	09 February 1971	26	Protestant	Civilian	Brougher Mountain, near Trillick, County Tyrone, Northern Ireland	Provisional Irish Republican Army	Killed while travelling in Landrover, which detonated landmine on track. British Army mobile patrol intended target
David Henson	09 February 1971	24	Unknown	Civilian	Brougher Mountain, near Trillick, County Tyrone, Northern Ireland	Provisional Irish Republican Army	Killed while travelling in Landrover, which detonated landmine on track. British Army mobile patrol intended target
George Beck	09 February 1971	43	Protestant	Civilian	Brougher Mountain, near Trillick, County Tyrone, Northern Ireland	Provisional Irish Republican Army	Killed while travelling in Landrover, which detonated landmine on track. British Army mobile patrol intended target
John Laurie	15 February 1971	22	Unknown	British Army	Crumlin Road, Ardoyne, Belfast	Provisional Irish Republican Army	Died seven days after being shot by sniper while on mobile patrol
Cecil Patterson	26 February 1971	45	Protestant	Royal Ulster Constabulary	Etna Drive, Ardoyne, Belfast	Provisional Irish Republican Army	Shot while on Royal Ulster Constabulary mobile patrol
Robert Buckley	26 February 1971	30	Protestant	Royal Ulster Constabulary	Etna Drive, Ardoyne, Belfast	Provisional Irish Republican Army	Shot while on Royal Ulster Constabulary mobile patrol
William Jolliffe	28 February 1971	18	Unknown	British Army	Westland Street, Bogside, Derry	Unknown	Died from inhaling fumes from fire extinguisher, when British Army Armoured Personnel Carrier came under petrol bomb attack
William Halligan	06 March 1971	21	Catholic	Civilian	Balaclava Street, Lower Falls, Belfast	British Army	Shot during street disturbances
Charles Hughes	08 March 1971	26	Catholic	Provisional Irish Republican Army	Leeson Street, Lower Falls, Belfast	Official Irish Republican Army	Shot while leaving house. Official Irish Republican Army/Irish Republican Army feud.
Dougald McCaughey	10 March 1971	23	Unknown	British Army	Squire's Hill, Ligoniel, Belfast	Provisional Irish Republican Army	Off duty, found shot. See 1971 Scottish soldiers' killings
Joseph McCaig	10 March 1971	18	Unknown	British Army	Squire's Hill, Ligoniel, Belfast	Provisional Irish Republican Army	Off duty, found shot. See 1971 Scottish soldiers' killings
John McCaig	10 March 1971	17	Unknown	British Army	Squire's Hill, Ligoniel, Belfast	Provisional Irish Republican Army	Off duty, found shot. See 1971 Scottish soldiers' killings
Isabella McKeague	08 May 1971	67	Protestant	Civilian	Albertbridge Road, Belfast	Non-specific Loyalist group	Died in fire which followed incendiary bomb attack on shop below her flat
William Reid	15 May 1971	32	Catholic	Provisional Irish Republican Army	Academy Street, Belfast	British Army	Shot during gun battle
Robert Bankier	22 May 1971	25	Unknown	British Army	Cromac Square, Markets, Belfast	Official Irish Republican Army	Shot by sniper as he left British Army Armoured Personnel Carrier
Michael Willets	25 May 1971	27	Unknown	British Army	Springfield Road Royal Ulster Constabulary/British Army base, Belfast	Provisional Irish Republican Army	Killed by time bomb
Martin O'Leary	06 July 1971	20	Unknown	Official Irish Republican Army	Mogul Mines, Silvermines, County Tipperary	Official Irish Republican Army	Died two days after being injured in premature bomb explosion
Seamus Cusack	08 July 1971	27	Catholic	Civilian	Abbey Park, Bogside, Derry	British Army	Shot during street disturbances
Desmond Beattie	08 July 1971	19	Catholic	Civilian	Lecky Road, Bogside, Derry	British Army	Shot during street disturbances
David Walker	12 July 1971	30	Unknown	British Army	Northumberland Street, Lower Falls, Belfast	Provisional Irish Republican Army	Shot by sniper, while leaving British Army (BA) observation post
Richard Barton	14 July 1971	24	Unknown	British Army	Shaw's Road, Andersonstown, Belfast	Provisional Irish Republican Army	Shot by sniper while on mobile patrol
Harry Thornton	07 August 1971	30	Catholic	Civilian	Springfield Road, Belfast	British Army	Shot while driving past Royal Ulster Constabulary/British Army base
Malcolm Hatton	08 August 1971	21	Unknown	British Army	Brompton Park, Ardoyne, Belfast	Provisional Irish Republican Army	Shot by sniper while on foot patrol
William Atwell	09 August 1971	40	Protestant	Civilian	Mackie's factory, Springfield Road, Belfast	Non-specific Republican group	Security man. Killed by nail bomb thrown into factory
Sarah Worthington	09 August 1971	50	Protestant	Civilian	Velsheda Park, Ardoyne, Belfast	British Army	Shot in her home
Leo McGuigan	09 August 1971	16	Catholic	Civilian	Estoril Park, Ardoyne, Belfast	British Army	Shot while walking
Patrick McAdorey	09 August 1971	24	Catholic	Provisional Irish Republican Army	Alliance Avenue, Ardoyne, Belfast	British Army	Shot during gun battle
John Beattie	09 August 1971	17	Protestant	Civilian	Ashmore Street, Shankill, Belfast	British Army	Shot, from British Army observation post in Clonard Monastery, while driving van
Francis Quinn	09 August 1971	20	Catholic	Civilian	Springfield Park, Ballymurphy, Belfast	British Army	Shot during gun battle by snipers from the nearby New Barnsley British Army base while going to the aid of a wounded man. See Ballymurphy massacre and Operation Demetrius
Hugh Mullan	09 August 1971	38	Catholic	Civilian	Springfield Park, Ballymurphy, Belfast	British Army	Catholic Priest. Shot during gun battle by snipers from the nearby New Barnsley British Army base, while going to the aid of a wounded man. See Ballymurphy massacre and Operation Demetrius
Francis McGuinness	09 August 1971	17	Catholic	Civilian	Finaghy Road North, Belfast	British Army	Shot during street disturbances
Desmond Healey	09 August 1971	14	Catholic	Civilian	Lenadoon Avenue, Belfast	British Army	Shot during street disturbances
Joan Connolly	09 August 1971	50	Catholic	Civilian	Springfield Road, Belfast	British Army	Shot as she stood opposite New Barnsley British Army base. See Ballymurphy massacre and Operation Demetrius
Daniel Teggart	09 August 1971	44	Catholic	Civilian	Springfield Road, Belfast	British Army	Shot as he stood opposite New Barnsley British Army base. See Ballymurphy massacre and Operation Demetrius
Noel Phillips	09 August 1971	20	Catholic	Civilian	Springfield Road, Belfast	British Army	Shot as he stood opposite New Barnsley British Army base. See Ballymurphy massacre and Operation Demetrius
Joseph Murphy	09 August 1971	41	Catholic	Civilian	Springfield Road, Belfast	British Army	Shot as he stood opposite New Barnsley British Army base. He died on 22 August 1971. See Ballymurphy massacre and Operation Demetrius
Winston Donnell	09 August 1971	22	Protestant	Ulster Defence Regiment	Clady near Strabane, County Tyrone	Provisional Irish Republican Army	Shot while at British Army Vehicle Check Point
Norman Watson	10 August 1971	53	Protestant	Civilian	Irish Street, Armagh	British Army	Shot while driving
Paul Challoner	10 August 1971	23	Unknown	British Army	Bligh's Lane, Creggan, Derry	Provisional Irish Republican Army	Shot while on foot patrol
Edward Doherty	10 August 1971	28	Catholic	Civilian	Whiterock Road, Ballymurphy, Belfast	British Army	Shot while walking. See Ballymurphy massacre and Operation Demetrius
John Laverty	11 August 1971	20	Catholic	Civilian	By St Aidan's Primary School, Ballymurphy, Belfast	British Army	Shot while walking along a path
William Stronge	11 August 1971	46	Protestant	Civilian	Ballyclare Street, Belfast	Unknown	Shot while moving furniture from sister's home
Seamus Simpson	11 August 1971	21	Catholic	Provisional Irish Republican Army	Rossnareen Avenue, Andersonstown, Belfast	British Army	Shot while throwing bomb at British Army foot patrol
William McKavanagh	11 August 1971	21	Catholic	Civilian	McAuley Street, Markets, Belfast	British Army	
William Ferris	12 August 1971	38	Protestant	Civilian	Crumlin Road, Belfast	British Army	Died two days after being shot while travelling in car
Hugh Herron	13 August 1971	31	Catholic	Civilian	Long Tower Street, Derry	British Army	Shot during gun battle
John Robinson	14 August 1971	21	Unknown	British Army	Butler Street, Ardoyne, Belfast	Official Irish Republican Army	Shot by sniper while on mobile patrol
Eamon Lafferty	18 August 1971	20	Catholic	Provisional Irish Republican Army	Kildrum Gardens, Creggan, Derry	British Army	Shot during gun battle
Eamon McDevitt	18 August 1971	24	Catholic	Civilian	Fountain Street, Strabane, County Tyrone	British Army	Deaf and dumb man, shot during street disturbances
John McKerr	20 August 1971	49	Catholic	Civilian	Ballymurphy, Belfast	British Army	Died nine days after being shot by sniper, while standing outside Corpus Christi Roman Catholic Church
George Crozier	23 August 1971	23	Unknown	British Army	Ardoyne, Belfast	Provisional Irish Republican Army	Shot by sniper, outside Flax Street Army base
Henry Beggs	25 August 1971	23	Protestant	Civilian	Malone Road, Belfast	Provisional Irish Republican Army	Killed in bomb attack on Northern Ireland Electricity office. Inadequate warning given.
Joseph Corr	27 August 1971	43	Catholic	Civilian	Junction of Springfield Road and Divismore Crescent, Ballymurphy, Belfast	British Army	Died 16 days after being shot
Ian Armstrong	29 August 1971	33	Unknown	British Army	Crossmaglen, County Armagh	Provisional Irish Republican Army	Shot while on mobile patrol
Clifford Loring	31 August 1971	18	Unknown	British Army	Stockman's Lane, Belfast	Provisional Irish Republican Army	Died one day after being shot at British Army Vehicle Check Point
Francis Veitch	03 September 1971	23	Protestant	Ulster Defence Regiment	Kinawley Royal Ulster Constabulary/British Army base, County Fermanagh	Provisional Irish Republican Army	Shot while on guard duty
Angela Gallagher	03 September 1971	1	Catholic	Civilian	Iveagh Crescent, Falls, Belfast	Provisional Irish Republican Army	Shot while in pram, during sniper attack on nearby British Army patrol
John Warnock	04 September 1971	18	Unknown	British Army	Derrybeg Park, Newry, County Down	Official Irish Republican Army	Killed in land mine attack on British Army mobile patrol
Annette McGavigan	06 September 1971	14	Catholic	Civilian	Corner of Blucher Street and Westland Street, Derry	British Army	Shot during street disturbances
David Stewardson	09 September 1971	29	Unknown	British Army	Castlerobin Orange Hall, Drumankelly, near Lisburn, County Antrim	Provisional Irish Republican Army	Killed attempting to defuse bomb
Martin Carroll	14 September 1971	23	Unknown	British Army	British Army base, Eastway Gardens, Creggan, Derry	Official Irish Republican Army	Shot by sniper
John Rudman	14 September 1971	21	Unknown	British Army	Edendork, near Coalisland, County Tyrone	Provisional Irish Republican Army	Shot while on mobile patrol
William McGreanery	15 September 1971	43	Catholic	Civilian	unction of Laburnum Terrace and Westland Street, Derry	British Army	Died shortly after being shot by sniper from Bligh's Lane Army base
Paul Carter	15 September 1971	21	Unknown	British Army	Royal Victoria Hospital, Falls Road, Belfast	Provisional Irish Republican Army	Died one day after being shot outside hospital.
Samuel Nelson	16 September 1971	46	Protestant	Civilian	Downing Street, Shankill, Belfast	Non-specific Loyalist group	Found shot in abandoned car
Peter Herrington	17 September 1971	28	Unknown	British Army	Brompton Park, Ardoyne, Belfast	Provisional Irish Republican Army	Shot by sniper, while on foot patrol
Robert Leslie	18 September 1971	20	Protestant	Royal Ulster Constabulary	Abercorn Square, Strabane County Tyrone	Provisional Irish Republican Army	Shot while on foot patrol
James Finlay	21 September 1971	31	Protestant	non-specific Loyalist group	Bann Street, Lower Oldpark, Belfast	non-specific Loyalist group	Died eight days after being injured in premature bomb explosion at house, Explosion occurred on 13 September 1971.
Rose Curry	23 September 1971	18	Catholic	Official Irish Republican Army	Merrion Street, Lower Falls, Belfast	Official Irish Republican Army	Killed in premature bomb explosion at house
Gerard O'Hare	23 September 1971	17	Catholic	Official Irish Republican Army	Merrion Street, Lower Falls, Belfast	Official Irish Republican Army	Killed in premature bomb explosion at house
Alexander Andrews	29 September 1971	60	Protestant	Civilian	Four Step Inn, Shankill Road, Belfast	Unknown	Killed in bomb attack
Ernest Bates	29 September 1971	38	Protestant	Civilian	Four Step Inn, Shankill Road, Belfast	Unknown	Killed in bomb attack
Peter Sharpe	01 October 1971	22	Unknown	British Army	Kerrera Street, Ardoyne, Belfast	Provisional Irish Republican Army	Shot while on foot patrol
Terence McDermott	02 October 1971	19	Catholic	Provisional Irish Republican Army	Lisburn Rural Council office, Harmony Hill, Lambeg, near Lisburn, County Antrim	Provisional Irish Republican Army	Died in premature bomb explosion
Patrick Daly	03 October 1971	57	Catholic	Civilian	Corner of Linden Street and Falls Road, Belfast	Provisional Irish Republican Army	Shot during gun battle between Provisional Irish Republican Army and British Army
Brian Hall	04 October 1971	22	Unknown	British Army	Cupar Street, Belfast	Official Irish Republican Army	Killed in bomb attack on British Army observation post
Winifred Maxwell	09 October 1971	45	Protestant	Civilian	Fiddler's House Bar, Durham Street, Belfast	Ulster Volunteer Force	Killed in bomb attack
Roger Wilkins	11 October 1971	32	Unknown	British Army	Letterkenny Road, Derry	Provisional Irish Republican Army	Died two weeks after being shot while on foot patrol
John Thompson	12 October 1971	21	Protestant	Non-specific Loyalist group	Bann Street, Lower Oldpark, Belfast	Non-specific Loyalist group	Died one month after being injured in premature bomb explosion at house. Incident occurred on 13 September 1971.
Cecil Cunningham	15 October 1971	46	Protestant	Royal Ulster Constabulary	Junction of Woodvale Road and Twaddell Avenue, Belfast	Provisional Irish Republican Army	Shot from passing car while sitting in stationary Royal Ulster Constabulary car
John Haslett	15 October 1971	21	Protestant	Royal Ulster Constabulary	Junction of Woodvale Road and Twaddell Avenue, Belfast	Provisional Irish Republican Army	Shot from passing car while sitting in stationary Royal Ulster Constabulary car
Joseph Hill	16 October 1971	24	Unknown	British Army	Columcille Court, Bogside, Derry	Provisional Irish Republican Army	Shot by sniper during street disturbances
Graham Cox	17 October 1971	35	Unknown	British Army	Oldpark Road, Belfast	Provisional Irish Republican Army	Died two days after being shot by sniper while travelling in British Army Armoured Personnel Carrier
George Hamilton	17 October 1971	21	Unknown	British Army	Glenalina Park, Ballymurphy, Belfast	Provisional Irish Republican Army	Shot by sniper while on foot patrol
David Thompson	17 October 1971	38	Catholic	Civilian	Corner of Seaforde Street and Sheriff Street, Short Strand, Belfast	British Army	Found shot in street
Maura Meehan	23 October 1971	30	Catholic	Provisional Irish Republican Army	Cape Street, Lower Falls, Belfast	British Army	Shot while travelling in car warning local residents of British Army house raids
Dorothy Maguire	23 October 1971	19	Catholic	Provisional Irish Republican Army	Cape Street, Lower Falls, Belfast	British Army	Shot while travelling in car warning local residents of British Army house raids
Sean Ruddy	23 October 1971	19	Catholic	Civilian	Hill Street, Newry, County Down	British Army	Shot by undercover British Army members, from nearby roof top, during attempted robbery of man outside bank. Assumed to be a Provisional Irish Republican Army member. See 1971 Newry killings
Thomas McLoughlin	23 October 1971	27	Catholic	Civilian	Hill Street, Newry, County Down	British Army	Shot by undercover British Army members, from nearby roof top, during attempted robbery of man outside bank. Assumed to be a Provisional Irish Republican Army member. See 1971 Newry killings
Robert Anderson	23 October 1971	25	Catholic	Civilian	Hill Street, Newry, County Down	British Army	Shot by undercover British Army members, from nearby roof top, during attempted robbery of man outside bank. Assumed to be a Provisional Irish Republican Army member. See 1971 Newry killings
Martin Forsythe	24 October 1971	19	Catholic	Provisional Irish Republican Army	Donegall Place, Belfast	Royal Ulster Constabulary	Shot by undercover RUC during bomb attack on Celebrity Club
Robert Lindsay	25 October 1971	47	Catholic	Civilian	Junction of Springfield Road and Falls Road, Belfast	Provisional Irish Republican Army	Died two days after being shot during sniper attack on British Army mobile patrol
Robert McFarland	26 October 1971	26	Protestant	Civilian	Altcar Street, Short Strand, Belfast	Provisional Irish Republican Army	Found shot in street
David Tilbury	27 October 1971	29	Unknown	British Army	Rosemount Royal Ulster Constabulary/British Army base, Derry	Provisional Irish Republican Army	Killed in bomb attack on British Army observation post at the rear of base
Angus Stevens	27 October 1971	18	Unknown	British Army	Rosemount Royal Ulster Constabulary/British Army base, Derry	Provisional Irish Republican Army	Killed in bomb attack on British Army observation post at the rear of base
Peter Graham	27 October 1971	26	Unknown	Saor Eire	St. Stephen's Green, Dublin	Saor Eire	Found shot at his flat. Internal Saor Eire dispute
Ronald Dodd	27 October 1971	34	Protestant	Royal Ulster Constabulary	Gallagh, near Toome, County Antrim	Provisional Irish Republican Army	Shot by sniper when RUC mobile patrol arrived at scene of a house fire
David Powell	27 October 1971	22	Unknown	British Army	Kinawley, County Fermanagh	Provisional Irish Republican Army	Killed in land mine attack on Armoured Personnel Carrier
Michael McLarnon	29 October 1971	22	Catholic	Civilian	Etna Drive, Ardoyne, Belfast	British Army	Died shortly after being shot, while standing at the front door of his home
Alfred Devlin	29 October 1971	42	Protestant	Royal Ulster Constabulary	Antrim Road, Belfast	Provisional Irish Republican Army	Killed in bomb attack on Chichester Road Royal Ulster Constabulary base
Norman Booth	30 October 1971	22	Unknown	British Army	Junction of Springfield Road and Cupar Street, Belfast	Provisional Irish Republican Army	Killed in bomb attack on British Army observation post
John Copeland	31 October 1971	23	Catholic	Civilian	Strathroy Park, Ardoyne, Belfast	British Army	Died two days after being shot near his home
Ian Doherty	31 October 1971	27	Unknown	British Army	Stockman's Lane, Belfast	Provisional Irish Republican Army	Died three days after being shot while on mobile patrol
Thomas Kells	31 October 1971	19	Protestant	Civilian	Flowbog Road, Dundrod, near Belfast, County Antrim	Unknown	Found shot by the side of road
Stanley Corry	01 November 1971	28	Protestant	Royal Ulster Constabulary	Avoca Shopping Centre, Andersonstown, Belfast	Provisional Irish Republican Army	Shot while investigating burglary
William Russell	01 November 1971	31	Protestant	Royal Ulster Constabulary	Avoca Shopping Centre, Andersonstown, Belfast	Provisional Irish Republican Army	Shot while investigating burglary
John Cochrane	02 November 1971	67	Protestant	Civilian	Ormeau Road, Belfast	Provisional Irish Republican Army	Killed in bomb attacks on drapery shop and Red Lion Bar, either side of Royal Ulster Constabulary base. Inadequate warning given. See Red Lion Pub bombing
Mary Gemmell	02 November 1971	55	Protestant	Civilian	Ormeau Road, Belfast	Provisional Irish Republican Army	Killed in bomb attacks on drapery shop and Red Lion Bar, either side of Royal Ulster Constabulary base. Inadequate warning given. See Red Lion Pub bombing
William Jordan	02 November 1971	31	Protestant	Civilian	Ormeau Road, Belfast	Provisional Irish Republican Army	Injured in bomb attacks on drapery shop and Red Lion Bar, either side of Royal Ulster Constabulary base. Inadequate warning given. He died on 4 November 1971. See Red Lion Pub bombing
Stephen McGuire	04 November 1971	20	Unknown	British Army	Ballymurphy, Belfast	Provisional Irish Republican Army	Died seven weeks after being shot by sniper at Henry Taggart British Army base
Christopher Quinn	04 November 1971	39	Catholic	Civilian	Upper Library Street, Belfast	British Army	Shot while walking along entry by Unity Flats
Kathleen Thompson	06 November 1971	47	Catholic	Civilian	Kildrum Gardens, Creggan, Derry	British Army	Shot in the back garden of her home
Paul Genge	07 November 1971	18	Unknown	British Army	Tandragee Road, Lurgan, County Armagh	Provisional Irish Republican Army	Off duty. Shot from passing car while walking along road
Ian Curtis	09 November 1971	23	Unknown	British Army	Foyle Road, Derry	Provisional Irish Republican Army	Shot by sniper while on foot patrol
Dermot Hurley	11 November 1971	50	Catholic	Royal Ulster Constabulary	Oldpark Road, Belfast	Provisional Irish Republican Army	Shot while in shop at rear of Oldpark Royal Ulster Constabulary base
Walter Moore	11 November 1971	37	Protestant	Royal Ulster Constabulary	Oldpark Road, Belfast	Provisional Irish Republican Army	Shot while in shop at rear of Oldpark Royal Ulster Constabulary base
Rene Heemskerk	12 November 1971	18	Unknown	Civilian	Grosvenor Road, Belfast	Non-specific Republican group	Dutch seaman. Shot in dentist's waiting room
Edwin Charnley	18 November 1971	22	Unknown	British Army	Anderson Street, Short Strand, Belfast	Provisional Irish Republican Army	Shot while on guard duty at bus depot
Michael Crossey	22 November 1971	21	Catholic	Provisional Irish Republican Army	Church Place, Lurgan, County Armagh	Provisional Irish Republican Army	Died in premature bomb explosion at Cellar Lounge Bar
Bridget Carr	23 November 1971	24	Unknown	Civilian	Lifford Road, Strabane, County Tyrone	Provisional Irish Republican Army	From County Donegal. Died four days after being shot during sniper attack on nearby British Army patrol, while walking along road.
Colin Davies	24 November 1971	38	Unknown	British Army	William Street, Lurgan, County Armagh	Provisional Irish Republican Army	Killed attempting to defuse bomb left in car showroom
Ian Hankin	27 November 1971	27	Protestant	Civilian	Near Newry, County Armagh	Provisional Irish Republican Army	Customs official. Shot by snipers firing at British Army patrol which had just arrived after bomb attack on Killeen Customs Post
James O'Neill	27 November 1971	39	Catholic	Civilian	Near Newry, County Armagh	Provisional Irish Republican Army	Customs official. Shot by snipers firing at British Army patrol which had just arrived after bomb attack on Killeen Customs Post
Paul Nicholls	27 November 1971	18	Unknown	British Army	St James Crescent, Falls, Belfast	Provisional Irish Republican Army	Shot by sniper while on foot patrol
Robert Benner	29 November 1971	25	Unknown	British Army	Teer, near Crossmaglen, County Armagh	Non-specific Republican group	Originally from Dundalk, County Louth. Off duty. Found shot
Vivien Gibney	01 December 1971	17	Protestant	Civilian	Cliftonville Circus, Belfast	Provisional Irish Republican Army	Died four days after being shot during sniper attack on Royal Ulster Constabulary foot patrol
Philomena McGurk	04 December 1971	46	Catholic	Civilian	Junction of Gt. George's Street and North Queen Street, New Lodge, Belfast	Ulster Volunteer Force	Killed in bomb attack on McGurk's bar. See McGurk's Bar bombing
Maria McGurk	04 December 1971	14	Catholic	Civilian	Junction of Gt. George's Street and North Queen Street, New Lodge, Belfast	Ulster Volunteer Force	Killed in bomb attack on McGurk's bar. See McGurk's Bar bombing
James Cromie	04 December 1971	13	Catholic	Civilian	Junction of Gt. George's Street and North Queen Street, New Lodge, Belfast	Ulster Volunteer Force	Killed in bomb attack on McGurk's bar. See McGurk's Bar bombing
John Colton	04 December 1971	49	Catholic	Civilian	Junction of Gt. George's Street and North Queen Street, New Lodge, Belfast	Ulster Volunteer Force	Killed in bomb attack on McGurk's bar. See McGurk's Bar bombing
Thomas McLaughlin	04 December 1971	55	Catholic	Civilian	Junction of Gt. George's Street and North Queen Street, New Lodge, Belfast	Ulster Volunteer Force	Killed in bomb attack on McGurk's bar. See McGurk's Bar bombing
David Milligan	04 December 1971	53	Catholic	Civilian	Junction of Gt. George's Street and North Queen Street, New Lodge, Belfast	Ulster Volunteer Force	Killed in bomb attack on McGurk's bar. See McGurk's Bar bombing
James Smyth	04 December 1971	58	Catholic	Civilian	Junction of Gt. George's Street and North Queen Street, New Lodge, Belfast	Ulster Volunteer Force	Killed in bomb attack on McGurk's bar. See McGurk's Bar bombing
Francis Bradley	04 December 1971	62	Catholic	Civilian	Junction of Gt. George's Street and North Queen Street, New Lodge, Belfast	Ulster Volunteer Force	Killed in bomb attack on McGurk's bar. See McGurk's Bar bombing
Thomas Kane	04 December 1971	48	Catholic	Civilian	Junction of Gt. George's Street and North Queen Street, New Lodge, Belfast	Ulster Volunteer Force	Killed in bomb attack on McGurk's bar. See McGurk's Bar bombing
Kathleen Irvine	04 December 1971	53	Catholic	Civilian	Junction of Gt. George's Street and North Queen Street, New Lodge, Belfast	Ulster Volunteer Force	Killed in bomb attack on McGurk's bar. See McGurk's Bar bombing
Garry Philip	04 December 1971	73	Catholic	Civilian	Junction of Gt. George's Street and North Queen Street, New Lodge, Belfast	Ulster Volunteer Force	Killed in bomb attack on McGurk's bar. See McGurk's Bar bombing
Edward Kane	04 December 1971	29	Catholic	Civilian	Junction of Gt. George's Street and North Queen Street, New Lodge, Belfast	Ulster Volunteer Force	Killed in bomb attack on McGurk's bar. See McGurk's Bar bombing
Edward Keenan	04 December 1971	69	Catholic	Civilian	Junction of Gt. George's Street and North Queen Street, New Lodge, Belfast	Ulster Volunteer Force	Killed in bomb attack on McGurk's bar. See McGurk's Bar bombing
Sarah Keenan	04 December 1971	58	Catholic	Civilian	Junction of Gt. George's Street and North Queen Street, New Lodge, Belfast	Ulster Volunteer Force	Killed in bomb attack on McGurk's bar. See McGurk's Bar bombing
Robert Spotswood	04 December 1971	38	Catholic	Civilian	Junction of Gt. George's Street and North Queen Street, New Lodge, Belfast	Ulster Volunteer Force	Killed in bomb attack on McGurk's bar. See McGurk's Bar bombing
Mary Thompson	06 December 1971	61	Protestant	Civilian	Dublin Road, Belfast	Provisional Irish Republican Army	Killed by wall collapsing onto her, shortly after bomb attack on building next door, Salvation Army Citadel
Denis Wilson	07 December 1971	31	Protestant	Ulster Defence Regiment	Curlagh, near Caledon, County Tyrone	Provisional Irish Republican Army	Off duty. Shot at his home
Sean Russell	08 December 1971	30	Catholic	Ulster Defence Regiment	New Barnsley Crescent, Ballymurphy, Belfast	Provisional Irish Republican Army	Off duty. Shot at his home
Jeremy Snow	08 December 1971	35	Unknown	British Army	New Lodge, Belfast	Provisional Irish Republican Army	Died four days after being shot by sniper while on foot patrol
Kenneth Smyth	10 December 1971	28	Protestant	Ulster Defence Regiment	Clady, near Strabane, County Tyrone	Provisional Irish Republican Army	Off duty. Shot while travelling to work in car
Daniel McCormick	10 December 1971	29	Catholic	ex-Ulster Defence Regiment	Clady, near Strabane, County Tyrone	Provisional Irish Republican Army	Shot while travelling to work in car
Joseph Parker	10 December 1971	25	Catholic	Civilian	Toby Hall, Butler Street, Ardoyne, Belfast	British Army	Shot during altercation with British Army patrol
Harold King	11 December 1971	29	Catholic	Civilian	Shankill Road, Belfast	Provisional Irish Republican Army	Killed in bomb attack on Balmoral Furnishing Company
Hugh Bruce	11 December 1971	70	Protestant	Civilian	Shankill Road, Belfast	Provisional Irish Republican Army	Killed in bomb attack on Balmoral Furnishing Company
Tracey Munn	11 December 1971	2	Catholic	Civilian	Shankill Road, Belfast	Provisional Irish Republican Army	Killed in bomb attack on Balmoral Furnishing Company
Colin Nicholl	11 December 1971	0	Catholic	Civilian	Shankill Road, Belfast	Provisional Irish Republican Army	Killed in bomb attack on Balmoral Furnishing Company
John Barnhill	12 December 1971	65	Protestant	Civilian Political Activist	Brickfield House, near Strabane, County Tyrone	Official Irish Republican Army	Ulster Unionist Stormont Senator. Shot during bomb attack on his home
Martin McShane	14 December 1971	16	Catholic	Civilian	Macrory Park, Coalisland, County Tyrone	British Army	Shot outside youth centre
Anthony Aspinwall	16 December 1971	22	Unknown	British Army (BA)	Alma Street, Lower Falls, Belfast	Provisional Irish Republican Army	Shot while on foot patrol
James Sheridan	18 December 1971	20	Catholic	Provisional Irish Republican Army	King Street, Magherafelt, County Londonderry	Provisional Irish Republican Army	Died in premature bomb explosion while travelling in car
John Bateson	18 December 1971	19	Catholic	Provisional Irish Republican Army	King Street, Magherafelt, County Londonderry	Provisional Irish Republican Army	Died in premature bomb explosion while travelling in car
Martin Lee	18 December 1971	19	Catholic	Provisional Irish Republican Army	King Street, Magherafelt, County Londonderry	Provisional Irish Republican Army	Died in premature bomb explosion while travelling in car
James McCallum	18 December 1971	16	Catholic	Civilian	Springfield Road, Belfast	Ulster Volunteer Force	Barman, killed in bomb attack on Murtagh's Bar
Margaret McCorry	20 December 1971	20	Catholic	Civilian	Crumlin Road, Belfast	Provisional Irish Republican Army	Shot by sniper during gun attack on British Army mobile patrol
John Lavery	21 December 1971	60	Catholic	Civilian	Lisburn Road, Belfast	Provisional Irish Republican Army	Publican. Killed by bomb which exploded as he attempted to carry it out of his bar
Gerald McDade	21 December 1971	23	Catholic	Provisional Irish Republican Army	Kerrera Street, Ardoyne, Belfast	British Army	Shot shortly after being detained by British Army patrol
Richard Ham	29 December 1971	20	Unknown	British Army	Foyle Road, Brandywell, Derry	Provisional Irish Republican Army	Shot while on foot patrol
Jack McCabe	30 December 1971	55	Unknown	Provisional Irish Republican Army	Swords Road, Santry, Dublin	Provisional Irish Republican Army	From County Cavan. Killed in premature bomb explosion in garage

== 1972 ==
Name	Date of death	Age	Religious affiliation	Status	Location of injury	Perpetrator	Notes
Keith Bryan	05 January 1972	18	Unknown	British Army	Ardmoulin Street, Lower Falls, Belfast	Provisional Irish Republican Army	Shot by sniper while on foot patrol
Daniel O'Neill	07 January 1972	20	Catholic	Provisional Irish Republican Army	Oranmore Street, Falls, Belfast	British Army	Died two days after being shot during gun battle
Peter Woods	08 January 1972	29	Catholic	Civilian	Lowwood Park, Skegoneill, Belfast	Non-specific Loyalist group	Shot at his home
Raymond Denham	12 January 1972	42	Protestant	Royal Ulster Constabulary	Waterford Street, Lower Falls, Belfast	Provisional Irish Republican Army	Shot at his workplace, off duty reservist
Maynard Crawford	13 January 1972	38	Protestant	Ulster Defence Regiment	King's Road, off Doagh Road, Newtownabbey, County Antrim	Provisional Irish Republican Army	Off duty. Shot while driving his firm's van
Eamon McCormick	16 January 1972	17	Catholic	Provisional Irish Republican Army Youth Section	Ballymurphy, Belfast	British Army	Died over two months after being shot during gun battle, near St Peter's School
Sydney Agnew	18 January 1972	40	Protestant	Civilian	The Mount, off Albertbridge Road, Belfast	Provisional Irish Republican Army	Shot at his home. Witness to the hijacking of a bus
Philip Stentiford	21 January 1972	18	Unknown	British Army	Derrynoose, near Keady, County Armagh	Provisional Irish Republican Army	Killed in land mine attack on British Army foot patrol
Peter McNulty	26 January 1972	47	Catholic	Provisional Irish Republican Army	Castlewellan Royal Ulster Constabulary base, County Down	Provisional Irish Republican Army	Killed in premature bomb explosion
Peter Gilgunn	27 January 1972	26	Catholic	Royal Ulster Constabulary	Creggan Road, Derry	Provisional Irish Republican Army	Shot during gun attack on Royal Ulster Constabulary patrol car
David Montgomery	27 January 1972	20	Protestant	Royal Ulster Constabulary	Creggan Road, Derry	Provisional Irish Republican Army	Shot during gun attack on Royal Ulster Constabulary patrol car
Raymond Carroll	28 January 1972	22	Protestant	Royal Ulster Constabulary	Oldpark Road, Belfast	Provisional Irish Republican Army	Off duty. Shot at garage
Robin Alers-Hankey	30 January 1972	35	Unknown	British Army	Abbey Street, Bogside, Derry	Provisional Irish Republican Army	Died four months after being shot by sniper during street disturbances. He was wounded on 2 September 1971
John Duddy	30 January 1972	17	Catholic	Civilian	Vicinity of Rossville Street, Bogside, Derry	British Army	Shot during anti-internment march. See Bloody Sunday (1972)
Kevin McElhinney	30 January 1972	17	Catholic	Civilian	Vicinity of Rossville Street, Bogside, Derry	British Army	Shot during anti-internment march. See Bloody Sunday (1972)
Patrick Doherty	30 January 1972	31	Catholic	Civilian	Vicinity of Rossville Street, Bogside, Derry	British Army	Shot during anti-internment march. See Bloody Sunday (1972)
Bernard McGuigan	30 January 1972	41	Catholic	Civilian	Vicinity of Rossville Street, Bogside, Derry	British Army	Shot during anti-internment march. See Bloody Sunday (1972)
Hugh Gilmour	30 January 1972	17	Catholic	Civilian	Vicinity of Rossville Street, Bogside, Derry	British Army	Shot during anti-internment march. See Bloody Sunday (1972)
William Nash	30 January 1972	19	Catholic	Civilian	Vicinity of Rossville Street, Bogside, Derry	British Army	Shot during anti-internment march. See Bloody Sunday (1972)
Michael McDaid	30 January 1972	20	Catholic	Civilian	Vicinity of Rossville Street, Bogside, Derry	British Army	Shot during anti-internment march. See Bloody Sunday (1972)
John Young	30 January 1972	17	Catholic	Civilian	Vicinity of Rossville Street, Bogside, Derry	British Army	Shot during anti-internment march. See Bloody Sunday (1972)
Michael Kelly	30 January 1972	17	Catholic	Civilian	Vicinity of Rossville Street, Bogside, Derry	British Army	Shot during anti-internment march. See Bloody Sunday (1972)
James Wray	30 January 1972	22	Catholic	Civilian	Vicinity of Rossville Street, Bogside, Derry	British Army	Shot during anti-internment march. See Bloody Sunday (1972)
Gerry Donaghy	30 January 1972	17	Catholic	Civilian	Vicinity of Rossville Street, Bogside, Derry	British Army	Shot during anti-internment march. See Bloody Sunday (1972)
Gerald McKinney	30 January 1972	35	Catholic	Civilian	Vicinity of Rossville Street, Bogside, Derry	British Army	Shot during anti-internment march. See Bloody Sunday (1972)
William McKinney	30 January 1972	26	Catholic	Civilian	Vicinity of Rossville Street, Bogside, Derry	British Army	Shot during anti-internment march. See Bloody Sunday (1972)
John Johnston	30 January 1972	59	Catholic	Civilian	Vicinity of Rossville Street, Bogside, Derry	British Army	Shot during anti-internment march. He died 16 June 1972. See Bloody Sunday (1972)
Ian Bramley	01 February 1972	25	Unknown	British Army	Lower Falls, Belfast	Provisional Irish Republican Army	Shot by sniper while leaving Hastings Street Royal Ulster Constabulary/British Army base
Thomas McElroy	02 February 1972	29	Catholic	Civilian	Divismore Park, Ballymurphy, Belfast	British Army	Shot by sniper from Henry Taggart Army base
Louis O'Neill	02 February 1972	49	Catholic	Civilian	Stewartstown, County Tyrone	Non-specific Loyalist group	Killed in bomb attack on Imperial Bar
Paul McFadden	05 February 1972	31	Catholic	Civilian	Castle Arcade, off Castle Lane, Belfast	Provisional Irish Republican Army	Died six days after being injured in van bomb explosion. Inadequate warning given
Phelim Grant	05 February 1972	Unknown	Catholic	Provisional Irish Republican Army	near Crumlin, Lough Neagh, County Antrim	Provisional Irish Republican Army	Died in premature bomb explosion while travelling on barge
Charles McCann	05 February 1972	Unknown	Catholic	Provisional Irish Republican Army	near Crumlin, Lough Neagh, County Antrim	Provisional Irish Republican Army	Died in premature bomb explosion while travelling on barge
David Seaman	06 February 1972	31	Unknown	Civilian	Cullaville, near Crossmaglen, County Armagh	Unknown	Englishman also known as Barry Barber. Found shot
Bernard Rice	08 February 1972	49	Catholic	Civilian	Crumlin Road, Belfast	Red Hand Commando	Shot from passing car while walking opposite Ardoyne shops
Patrick Casey	09 February 1972	26	Catholic	Non-specific Republican group	Keady, County Armagh	Non-specific Republican group	Died three days after being injured in an explosion at temporary council offices in school hall. Explosion occurred 6 February 1972
Joseph Cunningham	10 February 1972	26	Catholic	Provisional Irish Republican Army	O'Neill's Road, Newtownabbey, County Antrim	Royal Ulster Constabulary	Shot during gun battle
Ian Harris	10 February 1972	26	Unknown	British Army	Cullyhanna, County Armagh	Provisional Irish Republican Army	Killed in land mine attack on British Army mobile patrol
David Champ	10 February 1972	23	Unknown	British Army	Cullyhanna, County Armagh	Provisional Irish Republican Army	Killed in land mine attack on British Army mobile patrol
Thomas McCann	13 February 1972	19	Unknown	British Army	Newtownbutler, County Fermanagh	Non-specific Republican group	From Dublin. Off duty. Found shot
Thomas Callaghan	16 February 1972	45	Catholic	Ulster Defence Regiment	Foyle Road, Derry	Provisional Irish Republican Army	Off duty. Found shot, shortly after being abducted while driving bus
Michael Prime	16 February 1972	18	Unknown	British Army	M1 Motorway, County Down	Provisional Irish Republican Army	Shot by sniper while on British Army mobile patrol, by the Moira roundabout
Elizabeth English	17 February 1972	65	Catholic	Civilian	Barrack Street, Lower Falls, Belfast	Provisional Irish Republican Army	Died seven days after being shot during attempted ambush of British Army foot patrol
Gerard Steele	21 February 1972	27	Catholic	Provisional Irish Republican Army	Knockbreda Road, near to Castlereagh Road roundabout, Belfast	Provisional Irish Republican Army	Died in premature bomb explosion while travelling in car
Gerard Bell	21 February 1972	20	Catholic	Provisional Irish Republican Army	Knockbreda Road, near to Castlereagh Road roundabout, Belfast	Provisional Irish Republican Army	Died in premature bomb explosion while travelling in car
Joseph Magee	21 February 1972	31	Catholic	Provisional Irish Republican Army	Knockbreda Road, near to Castlereagh Road roundabout, Belfast	Provisional Irish Republican Army	Died in premature bomb explosion while travelling in car
Robert Dorrian	21 February 1972	28	Catholic	Provisional Irish Republican Army	Knockbreda Road, near to Castlereagh Road roundabout, Belfast	Provisional Irish Republican Army	Died in premature bomb explosion while travelling in car
Gerry Weston	22 February 1972	38	Catholic	British Army	Aldershot, England	Official Irish Republican Army	Catholic chaplain to British Army. Killed in bomb attack on British Army base. See 1972 Aldershot bombing
Joan Lunn	22 February 1972	39	Unknown	Civilian	Aldershot, England	Official Irish Republican Army	Killed in bomb attack on British Army base. See 1972 Aldershot bombing
Cherie Munton	22 February 1972	20	Unknown	Civilian	Aldershot, England	Official Irish Republican Army	Killed in bomb attack on British Army base. See 1972 Aldershot bombing
Thelma Bosley	22 February 1972	44	Unknown	Civilian	Aldershot, England	Official Irish Republican Army	Killed in bomb attack on British Army base. See 1972 Aldershot bombing
Margaret Grant	22 February 1972	32	Unknown	Civilian	Aldershot, England	Official Irish Republican Army	Killed in bomb attack on British Army base. See 1972 Aldershot bombing
John Haslar	22 February 1972	58	Unknown	Civilian	Aldershot, England	Official Irish Republican Army	Killed in bomb attack on British Army base. See 1972 Aldershot bombing
Jill Mansfield	22 February 1972	34	Unknown	Civilian	Aldershot, England	Official Irish Republican Army	Killed in bomb attack on British Army base. See 1972 Aldershot bombing
Henry Dickson	29 February 1972	46	Protestant	Ulster Defence Regiment	Lawrence Street, Lurgan, County Armagh	Provisional Irish Republican Army	Off duty. Shot at his home
John Fletcher	01 March 1972	43	Protestant	Ulster Defence Regiment	Frevagh, near Garrison, County Fermanagh	Provisional Irish Republican Army	Off duty. Shot outside his home
John Mahon	01 March 1972	16	Catholic	Civilian	Falls Road, Belfast	Royal Ulster Constabulary	Shot while travelling in stolen car in Belfast city centre. Car abandoned outside Royal Victoria Hospital
Michael Connors	01 March 1972	14	Catholic	Civilian (Civ)	Falls Road, Belfast	Royal Ulster Constabulary	Shot while travelling in stolen car in Belfast city centre. Car abandoned outside Royal Victoria Hospital
Thomas Morrow	02 March 1972	28	Protestant	Royal Ulster Constabulary	Camlough Road, Newry, County Down	Official Irish Republican Army	Died two days after being shot while investigating break-in at factory
Stephen Keating	03 March 1972	18	Unknown	British Army	Manor Street, Belfast	Provisional Irish Republican Army	Shot while on foot patrol
Albert Kavanagh	04 March 1972	18	Catholic	Provisional Irish Republican Army	Boucher Road, Belfast	Royal Ulster Constabulary	Shot during attempted bomb attack on factory
Janet Bereen	04 March 1972	21	Catholic	Civilian	Castle Lane, Belfast	Provisional Irish Republican Army	Killed in bomb attack on Abercorn Restaurant
Anne Owens	04 March 1972	22	Catholic	Civilian	Castle Lane, Belfast	Provisional Irish Republican Army	Killed in bomb attack on Abercorn Restaurant
Marcus McCausland	04 March 1972	39	Catholic	ex-Ulster Defence Regiment	Braehead Road, Derry	Official Irish Republican Army	Found shot, by side of road
Eamon Gamble	08 March 1972	27	Catholic	Non-specific Republican group	Keady, County Armagh	Non-specific Republican group	Died one month after being injured in an explosion at temporary council offices in school hall. Explosion occurred on 6 February 1972
Joseph Jardine	08 March 1972	44	Protestant	Ulster Defence Regiment	Middletown, County Armagh	Provisional Irish Republican Army	Off duty. Shot at his workplace, Ministry of Agriculture office
Gerard Crossen	09 March 1972	19	Catholic	Provisional Irish Republican Army	Clonard Street, Lower Falls, Belfast	Provisional Irish Republican Army	Died in premature bomb explosion in house
Anthony Lewis	09 March 1972	16	Catholic	Provisional Irish Republican Army	Clonard Street, Lower Falls, Belfast	Provisional Irish Republican Army	Died in premature bomb explosion in house
Sean Johnson	09 March 1972	19	Catholic	Provisional Irish Republican Army	Clonard Street, Lower Falls, Belfast	Provisional Irish Republican Army	Died in premature bomb explosion in house
Thomas McCann	09 March 1972	20	Catholic	Provisional Irish Republican Army	Clonard Street, Lower Falls, Belfast	Provisional Irish Republican Army	Died in premature bomb explosion in house
Bernadette Hyndman	12 March 1972	24	Catholic	Civilian	Abyssinia Street, Lower Falls, Belfast	Official Irish Republican Army	Shot outside her home during sniper attack on British Army foot patrol
Patrick McCrory	13 March 1972	19	Catholic	Civilian	Ravenhill Avenue, Belfast	Ulster Volunteer Force	Shot at his home
Colm Keenan	14 March 1972	19	Catholic	Provisional Irish Republican Army	Bogside, Derry	British Army	Shot while in entry off Dove Gardens
Eugene McGillan	14 March 1972	18	Catholic	Provisional Irish Republican Army	Bogside, Derry	British Army	Shot while in entry off Dove Gardens
William Logan	15 March 1972	23	Protestant	Royal Ulster Constabulary	Brackaville Road, Coalisland, County Tyrone	Provisional Irish Republican Army	Shot while on mobile patrol
Christopher Cracknell	15 March 1972	29	Unknown	British Army	Grosvenor Road, Belfast	Provisional Irish Republican Army	Killed by booby trap bomb, hidden in abandoned car
Anthony Butcher	15 March 1972	24	Unknown	British Army	Grosvenor Road, Belfast	Provisional Irish Republican Army	Killed by booby trap bomb, hidden in abandoned car
Carmel Knox	16 March 1972	20	Catholic	Civilian	Market Street, Lurgan, County Armagh	Non-specific Loyalist group	Killed when bomb exploded in public toilet
Ernest McAllister	20 March 1972	31	Protestant	Royal Ulster Constabulary	Donegall Street, Belfast	Provisional Irish Republican Army	Killed in car bomb explosion. Inadequate warning given. See Donegall Street bombing
Bernard O'Neill	20 March 1972	36	Catholic	Royal Ulster Constabulary	Donegall Street, Belfast	Provisional Irish Republican Army	Killed in car bomb explosion. Inadequate warning given. See Donegall Street bombing
Ernest Dougan	20 March 1972	39	Protestant	Civilian	Donegall Street, Belfast	Provisional Irish Republican Army	Killed in car bomb explosion. Inadequate warning given. See Donegall Street bombing
Samuel Trainor	20 March 1972	39	Protestant	Ulster Defence Regiment	Donegall Street, Belfast	Provisional Irish Republican Army	Killed in car bomb explosion. Inadequate warning given. See Donegall Street bombing
James Macklin	20 March 1972	30	Protestant	Civilian	Donegall Street, Belfast	Provisional Irish Republican Army	Killed in car bomb explosion. Inadequate warning given. See Donegall Street bombing
Sydney Bell	20 March 1972	65	Protestant	Civilian	Donegall Street, Belfast	Provisional Irish Republican Army	Killed in car bomb explosion. Inadequate warning given. See Donegall Street bombing
Henry Miller	20 March 1972	79	Protestant	Civilian	Donegall Street, Belfast	Provisional Irish Republican Army	Killed in car bomb explosion. Inadequate warning given. See Donegall Street bombing
John Taylor	20 March 1972	19	Unknown	British Army	William Street, Derry	Provisional Irish Republican Army	Shot by sniper while on foot patrol
Sean O'Riordan	23 March 1972	13	Catholic	Irish Republican Army Youth Section	Cawnpore Street, Falls, Belfast	British Army	Shot during petrol bomb attack on British Army foot patrol
Patrick Campbell	25 March 1972	16	Catholic	Provisional Irish Republican Army	Junction of Springhill Avenue and Springfield Road, Belfast	Provisional Irish Republican Army	Shot, in error, by other Irish Republican Army member, while setting up ambush of British Army patrol
Ingram Beckett	26 March 1972	37	Protestant	Ulster Defence Association	Conlig Street, Shankill, Belfast	Ulster Defence Association	Found shot. Internal Ulster Defence Association dispute.
Joseph Forsythe	28 March 1972	57	Protestant	Civilian	Outside Limavady Royal Ulster Constabulary base, County Londonderry.	Provisional Irish Republican Army	Killed in van bomb explosion. Driving past at the time of the attack. See The Troubles in Limavady
Robert McMichael	28 March 1972	27	Protestant	Civilian	Outside Limavady Royal Ulster Constabulary base, County Londonderry.	Provisional Irish Republican Army	Killed in van bomb explosion. Driving past at the time of the attack. See The Troubles in Limavady
Bernard Calladene	29 March 1972	39	Unknown	British Army	Wellington Street, Belfast.	Provisional Irish Republican Army	Killed by booby trap bomb in abandoned car.
Ruby Johnston	29 March 1972	35	Protestant	Civilian	Ring Road, Armagh.	Unknown	Died seven weeks after being badly burned during petrol bomb attack on bus.
Martha Crawford	30 March 1972	39	Catholic	Civilian	Rossnareen Avenue, Andersonstown, Belfast.	Provisional Irish Republican Army	Shot during gun battle between British Army and Provisional Irish Republican Army
Charles McCrystal	07 April 1972	17	Catholic	Provisional Irish Republican Army	Bawnmore Park, Greencastle, Belfast.	Provisional Irish Republican Army	Died in premature bomb explosion in garage
Samuel Hughes	07 April 1972	17	Catholic	Provisional Irish Republican Army	Bawnmore Park, Greencastle, Belfast.	Provisional Irish Republican Army	Died in premature bomb explosion in garage
John McErlean	07 April 1972	17	Catholic	Provisional Irish Republican Army	Bawnmore Park, Greencastle, Belfast.	Provisional Irish Republican Army	Died in premature bomb explosion in garage
Peter Sime	07 April 1972	22	Unknown	British Army	Springfield Road, Belfast.	Provisional Irish Republican Army	Shot by sniper while on foot patrol.
Eric Blackburn	10 April 1972	24	Unknown	British Army	Brooke Park, Rosemount, Derry.	Official Irish Republican Army	Killed in bomb attack on foot patrol.
Brian Thomasson	10 April 1972	21	Unknown	British Army	Brooke Park, Rosemount, Derry.	Official Irish Republican Army	Killed in bomb attack on foot patrol.
Elizabeth McAuley	13 April 1972	64	Protestant	Civilian	Main Street, Ballymoney, County Antrim.	Provisional Irish Republican Army	Killed in van bomb explosion. Inadequate warning given.
Joe McCann	15 April 1972	25	Catholic	Official Irish Republican Army	Joy Street, Markets, Belfast.	British Army	Shot as he walked along street.
Nicholas Hull	15 April 1972	22	Unknown	British Army	Divis Street, Lower Falls, Belfast.	Official Irish Republican Army	Shot by sniper while travelling in Armoured Personnel Carrier.
Sean McConville	15 April 1972	17	Catholic	Civilian	Crumlin Road, Belfast.	Ulster Volunteer Force	Shot from passing car.
Gerald Bristow	16 April 1972	26	Unknown	British Army	Bishop Street, Derry.	Official Irish Republican Army	Shot by sniper while on foot patrol.
Martin Robinson	16 April 1972	21	Unknown	British Army	Brandywell, Derry.	Official Irish Republican Army	Shot during gun attack on British Army base.
Patrick Magee	17 April 1972	20	Catholic	Civilian	Divis Street, Lower Falls, Belfast.	British Army	Shot as he walked along street.
Patrick Donaghy	17 April 1972	86	Catholic	Civilian	Divis Tower, Divis Flats, Belfast.	British Army	Shot at the window of his flat.
James Elliott	19 April 1972	36	Protestant	Ulster Defence Regiment	Altnamackan, near Newtownhamilton, County Armagh.	Provisional Irish Republican Army	Off duty. Found shot by the side of the road.
Martin Owens	19 April 1972	22	Catholic	Civilian	Horn Drive, Suffolk, Belfast.	Provisional Irish Republican Army	Found shot shortly after being thrown from car.
Gerard Donnelly	20 April 1972	22	Catholic	Civilian	Harrybrook Street, off Crumlin Road, Belfast.	Non-specific Loyalist group	Taxi driver. Found shot.
Francis Rowntree	22 April 1972	11	Catholic	Civilian	Divis Flats, Belfast.	British Army	Shot by rubber bullet.
Joseph Gold	25 April 1972	29	Unknown	British Army	Donegall Road, Belfast.	Provisional Irish Republican Army	Died four days after being shot at British Army Vehicle Check Point.
Rosaleen Gavin	29 April 1972	8	Catholic	Civilian	Oldpark Road, Belfast.	Provisional Irish Republican Army	Shot during sniper attack on British Army base.
David Currie	01 May 1972	26	Protestant	Civilian	Carrickfergus, County Antrim. Inadequate warning given.	Provisional Irish Republican Army	Killed in bomb attack on Courtauld's factory/
Victor Andrews	04 May 1972	20	Catholic	Civilian	New Lodge, Belfast.	Non-specific Loyalist group	Found stabbed to death in entry off Baltic Avenue.
John Ballard	11 May 1972	18	Unknown	British Army	Sultan Street, Lower Falls, Belfast.	Provisional Irish Republican Army	Shot by sniper while on foot patrol.
Patrick McVeigh	12 May 1972	44	Catholic	Civilian	Riverdale Park South, Andersonstown, Belfast.	British Army	Shot by undercover British Army members from passing car.
John Starrs	13 May 1972	19	Catholic	Provisional Irish Republican Army	William Street, Derry.	British Army	Shot during gun battle.
Thomas McIlroy	13 May 1972	50	Catholic	Civilian	Whiterock Road, Ballymurphy, Belfast.	Non-specific Loyalist group	Shot by sniper firing from Springmartin shortly after car bomb attack on Kelly's Bar. See Battle at Springmartin.
Alan Buckley	13 May 1972	22	Unknown	British Army	Whiterock Road, Ballymurphy, Belfast.	Provisional Irish Republican Army	Shot during gun battle. See Battle at Springmartin.
Robert McMullan	13 May 1972	32	Catholic	Civilian	New Barnsley Park, Ballymurphy, Belfast.	Unknown	Shot by sniper while walking along street.
Martha Campbell	14 May 1972	13	Catholic	Civilian	Springhill Avenue, Ballymurphy, Belfast.	Non-specific Loyalist group	Shot while walking along street.
John Pedlow	14 May 1972	17	Protestant	Civilian	Springmartin Road, Belfast.	Provisional Irish Republican Army	Died one day after being shot during gun battle between IRA and Loyalists.
Gerard McCusker	14 May 1972	24	Catholic	Civilian	Hopeton Street, Shankill, Belfast.	Non-specific Loyalist group	Found shot on waste ground.
Bernard Moane	17 May 1972	46	Catholic	Civilian	Near Greenisland, County Antrim.	Ulster Defence Association	Found shot by Knockagh War Memorial.
Ronald Hurst	17 May 1972	25	Unknown	British Army	Crossmaglen Royal Ulster Constabulary/British Army base, County Armagh.	Provisional Irish Republican Army	Shot while working on perimeter fencing.
John Hillman	18 May 1972	28	Unknown	British Army	Flax Street British Army base, Ardoyne, Belfast.	Provisional Irish Republican Army	Died three days after being shot by sniper.
Harold Morris	19 May 1972	15	Protestant	Civilian	Boundary Street, Shankill, Belfast.	Provisional Irish Republican Army	Shot by sniper while walking along street.
Manus Deery	19 May 1972	15	Catholic	Civilian	Westland Street, Derry.	British Army	Shot by sniper from British Army observation post on city walls, while in entry off street.
Henry Gillespie	20 May 1972	32	Protestant	Ulster Defence Regiment	Killyliss, near Dungannon, County Tyrone.	Provisional Irish Republican Army	Shot by sniper while on mobile patrol.
Richard Oliver	21 May 1972	40	Protestant	Civilian	Ballysillan Road, Belfast.	Unknown	Killed by falling telegraph pole which hijacked bus had collided with, during street disturbances.
William Best	21 May 1972	19	Catholic	British Army	William Street, Derry.	Official Irish Republican Army	Found shot while on leave.
Adrian Barton	21 May 1972	18	Protestant	Civilian	Springfield Road, Belfast.	Non-specific Loyalist group	Shot from passing car shortly after leaving Whitehorse Inn. Assumed to be a Catholic.
William Hughes	22 May 1972	54	Protestant	Civilian	Moortown, near Coagh, County Tyrone.	Provisional Irish Republican Army	Shot while sitting in parked car. Mistaken for civilian-type Royal Ulster Constabulary vehicle.
John Moran	23 May 1972	17	Catholic	Civilian	Whiterock Road, Ballymurphy, Belfast.	Non-specific Loyalist group	Died ten days after being injured by car bomb left outside Kelly's Bar.
Eustace Handley	23 May 1972	20	Unknown	British Army	Springhill Avenue, Ballymurphy, Belfast.	Provisional Irish Republican Army	Shot by sniper while on foot patrol.
Andrew Brennan	23 May 1972	22	Catholic	Civilian	Sicily Park, Finaghy, Belfast.	Ulster Defence Association	Shot outside his home.
Margaret Young	26 May 1972	64	Protestant	Civilian	Oxford Street, Belfast.	Provisional Irish Republican Army	Killed in car bomb explosion.
Gerard Duddy	27 May 1972	20	Catholic	Civilian	Andersonstown, Belfast.	Non-specific Loyalist group	Shot while walking at the junction of Finaghy Road North and Andersonstown Road.
James Teer	28 May 1972	21	Catholic	Civilian	Springfield Road, Belfast.	Ulster Volunteer Force	Shot from passing car while walking along road.
Joseph Fitzsimmons	28 May 1972	17	Catholic	Provisional Irish Republican Army	Anderson Street, Short Strand, Belfast.	Provisional Irish Republican Army	Died in premature bomb explosion in house.
John McIlhone	28 May 1972	17	Catholic	Provisional Irish Republican Army	Anderson Street, Short Strand, Belfast.	Provisional Irish Republican Army	Died in premature bomb explosion in house.
Edward McDonnell	28 May 1972	29	Catholic	Provisional Irish Republican Army	Anderson Street, Short Strand, Belfast.	Provisional Irish Republican Army	Died in premature bomb explosion in house.
Martin Engelen	28 May 1972	19	Catholic	Provisional Irish Republican Army	Anderson Street, Short Strand, Belfast.	Provisional Irish Republican Army	Died in premature bomb explosion in house.
Henry Crawford	28 May 1972	39	Catholic	Civilian	Anderson Street, Short Strand, Belfast.	Provisional Irish Republican Army	Died in premature bomb explosion in house.
Mary Clarke	28 May 1972	27	Catholic	Civilian	Anderson Street, Short Strand, Belfast.	Provisional Irish Republican Army	Died in premature bomb explosion in house.
John Nugent	28 May 1972	31	Catholic	Civilian	Anderson Street, Short Strand, Belfast.	Provisional Irish Republican Army	Died in premature bomb explosion in house.
Geraldine McMahon	28 May 1972	17	Catholic	Civilian	Anderson Street, Short Strand, Belfast.	Provisional Irish Republican Army	Died in premature bomb explosion in house.
Thomas Wardlow	29 May 1972	32	Catholic	Civilian	Millfield, Belfast.	Ulster Volunteer Force	Shot from passing car while walking.
Joan Scott	30 May 1972	12	Protestant	Civilian	Oldpark Road, Belfast.	Provisional Irish Republican Army	Died three days after being shot during sniper attack on Royal Ulster Constabulary mobile patrol.
Marcel Doglay	30 May 1972	28	Unknown	British Army	Springfield Road, Belfast.	Provisional Irish Republican Army	Killed when time bomb exploded inside Royal Ulster Constabulary/British Army base.
Michael Bruce	31 May 1972	27	Unknown	British Army	Kennedy Way, Andersonstown, Belfast.	Provisional Irish Republican Army	Shot by sniper while on mobile patrol.
Victor Husband	02 June 1972	23	Unknown	British Army	Derryvolan, near Rosslea, County Fermanagh.	Provisional Irish Republican Army	Killed in land mine attack on foot patrol.
Brian Robertson	02 June 1972	23	Unknown	British Army	Derryvolan, near Rosslea, County Fermanagh.	Provisional Irish Republican Army	Killed in land mine attack on foot patrol.
Gerard Murray	04 June 1972	26	Catholic	Civilian	Annesley Street, off Antrim Road, Belfast.	Non-specific Loyalist group	Shot outside his shop.
George Lee	06 June 1972	22	Unknown	British Army	Ballymurphy Parade, Ballymurphy, Belfast.	Provisional IRA	Shot by sniper while on foot patrol.
Charles Coleman	06 June 1972	29	Unknown	British Army	Tullymore Gardens, Andersonstown, Belfast.	Provisional IRA	Shot by sniper while on mobile patrol.
Jean Smith	08 June 1972	24	Catholic	Civilian	Glen Road, Andersonstown, Belfast.	Unknown	Shot by sniper, while travelling in car at bus terminus.
Norman Campbell	08 June 1972	19	Catholic	Civilian	Upper Townsend Street, Shankill, Belfast.	Unknown	Shot at his workplace, building site.
Samuel Donegan	08 June 1972	61	Unknown	Garda Síochána	Legakelly, near Newtownbutler, County Fermanagh.	Provisional IRA	Killed by booby trap bomb left by side of road, Garda Donegan had strayed a few yards over the border into Northern Ireland.
Edward Megahey	08 June 1972	44	Protestant	Ulster Defence Regiment	Buncrana Road, Derry.	Provisional IRA	Died three days after being shot by sniper while on Ulster Defence Regiment mobile patrol.
Roy Stanton	09 June 1972	27	Protestant	Ulster Defence Regiment	Finaghy Road North, Belfast.	Provisional IRA	Off duty. Shot as he left his workplace, Autolite factory.
Marian Brown	10 June 1972	17	Catholic	Civilian	Roden Street, off Grosvenor Road, Belfast.	Non-specific Loyalist group	Shot from passing car while standing with friends.
John Madden	11 June 1972	43	Catholic	Civilian	Oldpark Road, Belfast.	Non-specific Loyalist group	Shot outside his shop.
Joseph Campbell	11 June 1972	16	Catholic	Provisional Irish Republican Army Youth Section	Eskdale Gardens, Ardoyne, Belfast.	British Army	Shot during gun battle.
Norman McGrath	11 June 1972	18	Protestant	Civilian	Alloa Street, Lower Oldpark, Belfast.	British Army	Shot from passing British Army Armoured Personnel Carrier as he walked along street.
Peter Raistrick	11 June 1972	18	Unknown	British Army	Brooke Park British Army base, Derry.	Provisional IRA	Shot by sniper.
Alan Giles	12 June 1972	24	Unknown	British Army	Ardoyne, Belfast.	Provisional IRA	Shot during gun battle.
Charles Connor	16 June 1972	32	Catholic	Civilian	Minnowburn, Shaw's Bridge, Belfast.	Ulster Defence Association	Found shot.
Arthur McMillan	18 June 1972	37	Unknown	British Army	Bleary, near Lurgan, County Down.	Provisional IRA	Killed by booby trap bomb in derelict house.
Ian Mutch	18 June 1972	31	Unknown	British Army	Bleary, near Lurgan, County Down.	Provisional IRA	Killed by booby trap bomb in derelict house.
Colin Leslie	18 June 1972	26	Unknown	British Army	Bleary, near Lurgan, County Down.	Provisional IRA	Killed by booby trap bomb in derelict house.
Desmond Mackin	19 June 1972	37	Catholic	Civilian	Leeson Street, Lower Falls, Belfast.	Provisional IRA	Shot during altercation with Provisional Irish Republican Army members in Cracked Cup Social Club. Official Irish Republican Army / Provisional Irish Republican Army feud.
Bryan Sodden	19 June 1972	21	Unknown	British Army	Brompton	Provisional IRA	Shot by sniper while on mobile patrol.
Kerry McCarthy	21 June 1972	19	Unknown	British Army	Victoria Royal Ulster Constabulary / British Army base, Derry.	Provisional IRA	Shot by sniper while on sentry duty outside base.
Patrick McCullough	23 June 1972	17	Catholic	Civilian	Corner of Antrim Road and Atlantic Avenue, New Lodge, Belfast.	Non-specific Loyalist group	Shot from passing car while standing at the corner of road
Christopher Stevenson	24 June 1972	24	Unknown	British Army	Crabarkey, near Dungiven, County Londonderry.	Provisional IRA	Killed in land mine attack on British Army mobile patrol,
David Moon	24 June 1972	24	Unknown	British Army	Crabarkey, near Dungiven, County Londonderry.	Provisional IRA	Killed in land mine attack on British Army mobile patrol,
Stuart Reid	24 June 1972	26	Unknown	British Army	Crabarkey, near Dungiven, County Londonderry.	Provisional IRA	Killed in land mine attack on British Army mobile patrol,
John Brown	24 June 1972	29	Protestant	Ulster Defence Association	Blackmountain Parade, Springmartin, Belfast.	Ulster Defence Association	Found shot near his home. Internal Ulster Defence Association dispute.
James Bonner	25 June 1972	19	Catholic	Civilian	Whiterock Road, Ballymurphy, Belfast.	British Army	Shot while travelling in stolen car.
David Houston	26 June 1972	22	Protestant	Royal Ulster Constabulary	Water Street, Newry, County Down.	Provisional IRA	Shot attempting to stop bomb attack on The Stables Bar.
James Meredith	26 June 1972	20	Unknown	British Army	Abercorn Road, Derry.	Provisional IRA	Shot while on foot patrol.
Malcolm Banks	26 June 1972	30	Unknown	British Army	Junction of Seaforde Street and Comber Street, Short Strand, Belfast.	Provisional IRA	Shot by sniper while on mobile patrol.
John Black	26 June 1972	32	Protestant	Ulster Defence Association	Douglas Street, off Beersbridge Road, Belfast.	British Army	Died five weeks after being shot at barricade during street disturbances.
William Galloway	27 June 1972	18	Protestant	Ulster Defence Association	Edlingham Street, Tiger's Bay, Belfast.	Non-specific Republican group	Shot during street disturbances.
Bernard Norney	27 June 1972	38	Catholic	Civilian	Whiterock Road, Ballymurphy, Belfast.	Provisional IRA	Shot while attempting to drive through Provisional Irish Republican Army roadblock.
Paul Jobling	01 July 1972	19	Unknown	Civilian	Westway Drive, Glencairn, Belfast.	Non-specific Loyalist group	English visitor. Found shot on waste ground.
Daniel Hayes	01 July 1972	40	Catholic	Civilian	Penrith Street, Shankill, Belfast.	Non-specific Loyalist group	Found shot in playground.
Hugh Clawson	02 July 1972	39	Protestant	Civilian	Cliftonville Road, Belfast.	Non-specific Republican group	Found shot on waste ground.
David Fisher	02 July 1972	30	Protestant	Civilian	Cliftonville Road, Belfast.	Non-specific Republican group	Found shot on waste ground.
Gerard McCrea	02 July 1972	27	Catholic	Civilian	Forthriver Road, Glencairn, Belfast.	Non-specific Loyalist group	Found shot.
James Howell	02 July 1972	31	Catholic	Civilian	Cavour Street, off Old Lodge Road, Belfast.	Non-specific Loyalist group	Found shot in Gerard McCrea's car.
John O'Hanlon	03 July 1972	38	Catholic	Civilian	Twickenham Street, Shankill, Belfast.	Ulster Volunteer Force	Found shot on waste ground.
Malcolm Orr	05 July 1972	20	Protestant	Civilian	Carnaghliss, near Belfast, County Antrim.	Unknown	Found shot by the side of the road.
Peter Orr	05 July 1972	19	Protestant	Civilian	Carnaghliss, near Belfast, County Antrim.	Unknown	Found shot by the side of the road.
Samuel Robinson	07 July 1972	19	Protestant	Civilian	Cavendish Street, Falls, Belfast.	Provisional IRA	Shot immediately after crashing into Provisional Irish Republican Army roadblock.
Laurence McKenna	08 July 1972	22	Catholic	Civilian	Junction of Falls Road and Waterford Street, Lower Falls, Belfast.	Ulster Volunteer Force	Died three days after being shot.
Joseph Flemming	09 July 1972	30	Catholic	Territorial Army	Little Distillery Street, off Grosvenor Road, Belfast.	Non-specific Republican group	Off duty. Found shot in partially burnt out car.
Brian McMillan	09 July 1972	21	Protestant	Civilian	Little Distillery Street, off Grosvenor Road, Belfast.	Non-specific Republican group	Found shot in partially burnt out car.
Alan Meehan	09 July 1972	18	Protestant	Civilian	Little Distillery Street, off Grosvenor Road, Belfast.	Non-specific Republican group	Found shot in partially burnt out car. He died 11th July 1972
David Andrews	09 July 1972	31	Protestant	Civilian	Waterworks, off Cavehill Road, Belfast.	Non-specific Republican group	Found shot.
Angelo Fionda	09 July 1972	60	Catholic	Civilian	Junction of Panton Street and Falls Road, Belfast.	British Army	Shot while driving his car.
Patrick Butler	09 July 1972	38	Catholic	Civilian	Westrock Drive, Ballymurphy, Belfast.	British Army	Shot by sniper from British Army observation post in Corry's Timber Yard. See Springhill massacre.
Noel Fitzpatrick	09 July 1972	40	Catholic	Civilian	Westrock Drive, Ballymurphy, Belfast.	British Army	Catholic Priest. Shot by sniper from British Army (BA) observation post in Corry's Timber Yard. See Springhill massacre.
Margaret Gargan	09 July 1972	13	Catholic	Civilian	Westrock Drive, Ballymurphy, Belfast.	British Army	Shot by sniper from British Army observation post in Corry's Timber Yard. See Springhill massacre.
John Dougal	09 July 1972	16	Catholic	Provisional Irish Republican Army Youth Section	Westrock Drive, Ballymurphy, Belfast.	British Army	Shot by sniper from British Army observation post in Corry's Timber Yard. See Springhill massacre.
David McCafferty	09 July 1972	15	Catholic	Official Irish Republican Army Youth Section	Westrock Drive, Ballymurphy, Belfast.	British Army	Shot by sniper from British Army observation post in Corry's Timber Yard. See Springhill massacre.
Gerald Turkington	09 July 1972	32	Protestant	Ulster Defence Association	Stewart Street, Markets, Belfast.	Provisional IRA	Found shot.
Gerard Gibson	11 July 1972	16	Catholic	Official Irish Republican Army Youth Section	Carrigart Avenue, Suffolk, Belfast.	British Army	Shot while in house.
Charles Watson	11 July 1972	21	Catholic	Civilian	Off Carlisle Circus, Belfast.	Non-specific Loyalist group	Found shot.
Terence Jones	11 July 1972	23	Unknown	British Army	Great James Street, Derry.	Provisional IRA	Shot while on foot patrol.
Paul Beattie	12 July 1972	19	Protestant	Civilian	Off Churchill Park, Portadown, County Armagh.	Non-specific Republican group	Found shot in entry.
Jack McCabe	12 July 1972	48	Catholic	Civilian	High Street, Portadown, County Armagh.	Ulster Defence Association	Shot at his licensed premises, McCabe's Bar.
William Cochrane	12 July 1972	53	Protestant	Civilian	High Street, Portadown, County Armagh.	Ulster Defence Association	Shot while inside McCabe's Bar.
David McClenaghan	12 July 1972	15	Catholic	Civilian	Southport Street, Lower Oldpark, Belfast.	Non-specific Loyalist group	Shot at his home.
Colin Poots	12 July 1972	21	Protestant	Civilian	Off Springfield Road, Belfast.	Non-specific Republican group	Found shot by Flush River.
Martin Rooney	13 July 1972	22	Unknown	British Army	Clonard Street, Lower Falls, Belfast.	Provisional IRA	Shot by sniper while on mobile patrol.
Kenneth Mogg	13 July 1972	29	Unknown	British Army	Dunville Park, Falls Road, Belfast.	Provisional IRA	Shot by sniper while on mobile patrol.
David Meeke	13 July 1972	24	Unknown	British Army	Hooker Street, Ardoyne, Belfast.	Provisional IRA	Shot by sniper while on foot patrol.
Henry Russell	13 July 1972	23	Catholic	Ulster Defence Regiment	Larkfield Drive, Sydenham, Belfast.	Non-specific Loyalist group	Off duty. Found shot.
Thomas Burns	13 July 1972	35	Catholic	Civilian	Glenpark Street, Oldpark, Belfast.	British Army	Shot while leaving Glenpark Social Club.
James Reid	13 July 1972	27	Catholic	Provisional IRA	Eskdale Gardens, Ardoyne, Belfast.	British Army	Shot during gun battle.
Terence Toolan	13 July 1972	36	Catholic	Civilian	Eskdale Gardens, Ardoyne, Belfast.	British Army	Shot during gun battle.
Louis Scullion	14 July 1972	27	Catholic	Provisional IRA	Off Upper Library Street, Belfast.	British Army	Shot while walking through Unity Flats.
Robert Williams-Wynn	14 July 1972	24	Unknown	British Army	Lenadoon, Belfast.	Provisional IRA	Shot by sniper during gun battle.
Peter Heppenstall	14 July 1972	20	Unknown	British Army	Alliance Avenue, Ardoyne, Belfast.	Provisional IRA	Shot by sniper while on foot patrol.
Jane McIntyre	14 July 1972	64	Protestant	Civilian	Highpark Drive, Highfield, Belfast.	Provisional IRA	Shot outside her home during sniper attack on the nearby Black Mountain School British Army base.
Edward Brady	14 July 1972	30	Catholic	Official Irish Republican Army	Ardilea Street, Ardoyne, Belfast.	British Army	Shot during gun battle.
John Williams	14 July 1972	22	Unknown	British Army	Alliance Avenue, Ardoyne, Belfast.	Provisional IRA	Shot during gun battle.
Felix Hughes	15 July 1972	35	Catholic	Civilian	Off Watsons Street, Edenderry, Portadown, County Armagh.	Ulster Defence Association	Abducted somewhere in Portadown, County Armagh. Found shot in drainage ditch on 4 August 1972.
John Young	15 July 1972	27	Unknown	British Army	Silverbridge, near Crossmaglen, County Armagh.	Provisional IRA	Killed attempting to defuse bomb by side of road.
John Mooney	15 July 1972	17	Catholic	Civilian	Ligoniel Road, Ligoniel, Belfast.	British Army	Shot while walking along road.
Kenneth Canham	15 July 1972	24	Unknown	British Army	Lenadoon Avenue, Belfast.	Provisional IRA	Shot by sniper while on foot patrol.
Terence Graham	16 July 1972	24	Unknown	British Army	Carran, near Crossmaglen, County Armagh.	Provisional IRA	Killed in land mine attack on Armoured Personnel Carrier.
James Lee	16 July 1972	25	Unknown	British Army	Carran, near Crossmaglen, County Armagh.	Provisional IRA	Killed in land mine attack on Armoured Personnel Carrier.
Robert Laverty	16 July 1972	18	Protestant	Royal Ulster Constabulary	Antrim Road, Belfast.	Provisional IRA	Shot while sitting in stationary Royal Ulster Constabulary patrol car.
Tobias Molloy	16 July 1972	18	Catholic	Provisional Irish Republican Army Youth Section	Strabane, County Tyrone.	British Army	Shot by rubber bullet during street disturbances, outside Lifford Road British Army base.
Francis McKeown	16 July 1972	43	Catholic	Civilian	Shaw's Road, Andersonstown, Belfast.	British Army	Died one day after being shot.
James Jones	18 July 1972	18	Unknown	British Army	Ballymurphy, Belfast.	Provisional IRA	Shot by sniper while inside Vere Foster School British Army base.
Thomas Mills	18 July 1972	56	Protestant	Civilian	Ballygomartin Road, Belfast.	British Army	Nightwatchman. Shot in unclear circumstances at his workplace. Finlay's packaging factory.
Henry Gray	19 July 1972	71	Protestant	Civilian	Springfield Road, Belfast.	Provisional IRA	Shot trying to stop bomb attack on Whitehorse Inn.
Alan Jack	19 July 1972	0	Protestant	Civilian	Canal Street, off Abercorn Square, Strabane, County Tyrone.	Provisional IRA	Killed in car bomb explosion. Inadequate warning given.
Hugh Wright	19 July 1972	21	Protestant	Civilian	Off Hightown Road, near Belfast, County Antrim.	Non-specific Loyalist group	Found shot in field.
Robert Leggett	20 July 1972	50	Protestant	Civilian	Springfield Road, Belfast.	Provisional IRA	Shot attempting to stop bomb attack on his shop.
Anthony Davidson	21 July 1972	21	Catholic	Civilian	Clovelly Street, off Springfield Road, Belfast.	Non-specific Loyalist group	Shot at his home.
Stephen Cooper	21 July 1972	19	Unknown	British Army	Oxford Street Bus Station, Belfast.	Provisional IRA	Killed in car bomb explosion. Inadequate warning given. See Bloody Friday (1972).
Philip Price	21 July 1972	27	Unknown	British Army	Oxford Street Bus Station, Belfast.	Provisional IRA	Killed in car bomb explosion. Inadequate warning given. See Bloody Friday (1972).
William Crothers	21 July 1972	15	Protestant	Civilian	Oxford Street Bus Station, Belfast.	Provisional IRA	Killed in car bomb explosion. Inadequate warning given. See Bloody Friday (1972).
William Irvine	21 July 1972	18	Protestant	Ulster Defence Association	Oxford Street Bus Station, Belfast.	Provisional IRA	Killed in car bomb explosion. Inadequate warning given. See Bloody Friday (1972).
Thomas Killops	21 July 1972	39	Protestant	Civilian	Oxford Street Bus Station, Belfast.	Provisional IRA	Killed in car bomb explosion. Inadequate warning given. See Bloody Friday (1972).
Jackie Gibson	21 July 1972	45	Protestant	Civilian	Oxford Street Bus Station, Belfast.	Provisional IRA	Killed in car bomb explosion. Inadequate warning given. See Bloody Friday (1972).
Margaret O'Hare	21 July 1972	34	Catholic	Civilian	Cavehill Road, Belfast.	Provisional IRA	Killed in car bomb explosion outside row of shops. Inadequate warning given. See Bloody Friday (1972).
Brigid Murray	21 July 1972	65	Catholic	Civilian	Cavehill Road, Belfast.	Provisional IRA	Killed in car bomb explosion outside row of shops. Inadequate warning given. See Bloody Friday (1972).
Stephen Parker	21 July 1972	14	Protestant	Civilian	Cavehill Road, Belfast.	Provisional IRA	Killed in car bomb explosion outside row of shops. Inadequate warning given. See Bloody Friday (1972).
Joseph Rosato	21 July 1972	59	Catholic	Civilian	Deerpark Road, Oldpark, Belfast.	Non-specific Loyalist group	Shot at his home.
Joseph Downey	21 July 1972	23	Catholic	Provisional IRA	Cromac Street, Markets, Belfast.	British Army	Shot during gun battle.
Rosemary McCartney	22 July 1972	27	Catholic	Civilian	Forthriver Road, Glencairn, Belfast.	Ulster Defence Association	Found shot in abandoned car.
Patrick O'Neill	22 July 1972	26	Catholic	Civilian	Forthriver Road, Glencairn, Belfast.	Ulster Defence Association	Found shot in abandoned car.
Francis Arthurs	22 July 1972	34	Catholic	Civilian	Liffey Street, Lower Oldpark, Belfast.	Ulster Volunteer Force	Found shot in abandoned car.
Robert McComb	23 July 1972	22	Protestant	Ulster Defence Regiment	Kerrera Street, Ardoyne, Belfast.	Provisional IRA	Off duty. Found shot.
James Casey	24 July 1972	57	Catholic	Civilian	Park Avenue, Rosemount, Derry.	British Army	Shot while travelling in car.
Frederick Maguire	24 July 1972	56	Protestant	Civilian	Mayo Street, Shankill, Belfast.	Ulster Defence Association	Found shot. Assumed to be a Catholic.
Brian Thomas	24 July 1972	20	Unknown	British Army	Ballymurphy, Belfast.	Provisional IRA	Shot by sniper, while in Vere Foster School British Army base.
James Kenna	25 July 1972	19	Protestant	Ulster Defence Association	Junction of Roden Street and Clifford Street, Belfast.	Ulster Defence Association	Shot while walking at the junction.
David Allen	26 July 1972	22	Unknown	British Army	Unity Flats, off Upper Library Street, Belfast.	Provisional IRA	Shot while on foot patrol.
Francis Corr	26 July 1972	52	Catholic	Civilian	Summer Street, Lower Oldpark, Belfast.	Ulster Defence Association	Found shot in burning abandoned car.
James McGerty	26 July 1972	26	Catholic	Civilian	Summer Street, Lower Oldpark, Belfast.	Ulster Defence Association	Found shot in burning abandoned car.
Francis McStravick	27 July 1972	42	Catholic	Civilian	Off Linfield Road, Sandy Row, Belfast.	Ulster Defence Association	Found shot on waste ground.
Seamus Cassidy	28 July 1972	22	Catholic	Provisional IRA	New Lodge Road, Belfast.	British Army	Died one day after being shot by sniper while sitting in parked car outside Starry Plough Bar.
Philip Maguire	28 July 1972	55	Catholic	Civilian	Carrowreagh Road, Dundonald, Belfast.	Non-specific Loyalist group	Found shot in his firm's van.
Daniel Dunne	29 July 1972	19	Catholic	Civilian	Blackwood Street, off Ormeau Road, Belfast.	Ulster Defence Association	Shot outside his home.
William McAfee	30 July 1972	54	Protestant	Civilian	Cairnburn Road, off Old Holywood Road, Belfast.	Non-specific Loyalist group	Found shot.
Daniel Hegarty	31 July 1972	15	Catholic	Civilian	Creggan Heights, Creggan, Derry.	British Army	Shot while walking along road.
Seamus Bradley	31 July 1972	19	Catholic	Provisional IRA	Bligh's Lane, Creggan, Derry.	British Army	Shot.
Kathryn Eakin	31 July 1972	8	Protestant	Civilian	Main Street, Claudy, County Londonderry.	Provisional IRA	Killed when car bomb exploded outside McElhinney's Bar. Inadequate warning given. See Claudy bombing.
James McClelland	31 July 1972	65	Protestant	Civilian	Church Street, Claudy, County Londonderry.	Provisional IRA	Killed when car bomb exploded outside Beaufort Hotel. Inadequate warning given. See Claudy bombing.
David Miller	31 July 1972	60	Protestant	Civilian	Church Street, Claudy, County Londonderry.	Provisional IRA	Killed when car bomb exploded outside Beaufort Hotel. Inadequate warning given. See Claudy bombing.
Elizabeth McElhinney	31 July 1972	59	Catholic	Civilian	Main Street, Claudy, County Londonderry.	Provisional IRA	Killed when car bomb exploded outside McElhinney's Bar. Inadequate warning given. See Claudy bombing.
Joseph McCloskey	31 July 1972	38	Catholic	Civilian	Main Street, Claudy, County Londonderry.	Provisional IRA	Killed when car bomb exploded outside McElhinney's Bar. Inadequate warning given. See Claudy bombing.
William Temple	31 July 1972	16	Protestant	Civilian	Church Street, Claudy, County Londonderry.	Provisional IRA	Killed when car bomb exploded outside Beaufort Hotel. Inadequate warning given. See Claudy bombing.
Rose McLaughlin	31 July 1972	52	Catholic	Civilian	Main Street, Claudy, County Londopnderry.	Provisional IRA	Injured when car bomb exploded outside McElhinney's Bar. She died 3 August 1972. Inadequate warning given. See Claudy bombing.
Joseph Connolly	31 July 1972	15	Catholic	Civilian	Main Street, Claudy, County Londonderry.	Provisional IRA	Injured when car bomb exploded outside McElhinney's Bar. He died 8 August 1972. Inadequate warning given. See Claudy bombing.
Arthur Hone	31 July 1972	38	Catholic	Civilian	Main Street, Claudy, County Londonderry.	Provisional IRA	Injured when car bomb exploded outside McElhinney's Bar. He died 12 August 1972. Inadequate warning given. See Claudy bombing.
William Clark	03 August 1972	34	Unknown	British Army	Urney, near Clady, County Tyrone.	Irish Republican Army	Killed attempting to defuse bomb discovered by side of road.
Robert McCrudden	03 August 1972	19	Catholic	Irish Republican Army	Hooker Street, Ardoyne, Belfast.	British Army	Shot during gun battle.
David Card	04 August 1972	21	Unknown	British Army	Commedagh Drive, Andersonstown, Belfast.	Irish Republican Army	Shot while on foot patrol.
Terence Hennebrey	07 August 1972	17	Catholic	Civilian	Glenmachan Street, Village, Belfast.	non-specific Loyalist group	Found shot in entry.
David Wynne	07 August 1972	21	Unknown	British Army	Forfey, near Lisnaskea, County Fermanagh.	Irish Republican Army	Killed in land mine attack on mobile patrol.
Errol Gordon	07 August 1972	22	Unknown	British Army	Forfey, near Lisnaskea, County Fermanagh.	Irish Republican Army	Killed in land mine attack on mobile patrol.
William Creighton	07 August 1972	27	Protestant	Ulster Defence Regiment	Drumrainey, Magheraveely, near Newtownbutler, County Fermanagh.	Irish Republican Army	Off duty. Shot outside his home.
Geoffrey Knipe	07 August 1972	24	Unknown	British Army	Drumarg, Armagh.	not known	Killed when Armoured Personnel Carrier crashed after coming under missile attack thrown from crowd.
Colm Murtagh	09 August 1972	24	Catholic	Irish Republican Army	Dublin Road, Newry, County Down.	Irish Republican Army	Died in premature bomb explosion in garage.
Anne Parker	11 August 1972	18	Catholic	Irish Republican Army	North Howard Street, Lower Falls, Belfast.	Irish Republican Army	Died in premature bomb explosion while travelling in van.
Michael Clarke	11 August 1972	22	Catholic	Irish Republican Army	North Howard Street, Lower Falls, Belfast.	Irish Republican Army	Died in premature bomb explosion while travelling in van.
Francis Wynne	12 August 1972	37	Catholic	Civilian	Jaffa Street, Shankill, Belfast.	non-specific Loyalist group	Found shot in abandoned car.
Thomas Madden	13 August 1972	48	Catholic	Civilian	Oldpark Road, Belfast.	non-specific Loyalist group	Found stabbed and beaten to death in shop doorway.
David Storey	14 August 1972	36	Unknown	British Army	Andersonstown, Belfast.	Irish Republican Army	Killed by booby trap bomb left outside Casement Park British Army base.
Brian Hope	14 August 1972	20	Unknown	British Army	Andersonstown, Belfast.	Irish Republican Army	Killed by booby trap bomb left outside Casement Park British Army base.
Charles McNeill	14 August 1972	70	Catholic	Civilian	Brompton Park, Ardoyne, Belfast.	Irish Republican Army	Shot during sniper attack on foot patrol.
William Spence	16 August 1972	32	Protestant	Civilian	Shankill, Belfast.	Ulster Volunteer Force	Barman. Shot while in Long Bar.
Michael Boddy	17 August 1972	24	Unknown	British Army	Selby Street, off Grosvenor Road, Belfast.	Irish Republican Army	Shot by sniper while on foot patrol.
Philip Faye	18 August 1972	21	Catholic	Civilian	Island Street, Belfast.	Ulster Defence Association	Shot at his home.
Leonard Layfield	18 August 1972	24	Unknown	British Army	Junction of Falls Road and Beechmount Avenue, Belfast.	Irish Republican Army	Shot by sniper while at British Army Vehicle Check Point.
Richard Jones	18 August 1972	23	Unknown	British Army	Excise Street, off Grosvenor Road, Belfast.	Irish Republican Army	Shot by sniper while on mobile patrol.
James Neill	19 August 1972	44	Protestant	Civilian	Elswick Street, off Springfield Road, Belfast.	Irish Republican Army	Found shot.
James Lindsay	20 August 1972	45	Protestant	Civilian	Glencairn Road, Glencairn, Belfast.	Ulster Volunteer Force	Found shot.
James Johnston	22 August 1972	40	Protestant	Civilian Political Activist	Turin Street, off Grosvenor Road, Belfast.	Irish Republican Army	Member of Loyalist Association of Workers. Found shot in abandoned van.
Oliver Rowntree	22 August 1972	22	Catholic	Irish Republican Army	Newry, County Down.	Irish Republican Army	Died in premature bomb explosion at Customs Office. See Newry customs bombing.
Noel Madden	22 August 1972	18	Catholic	Irish Republican Army	Newry, County Down.	Irish Republican Army	Died in premature bomb explosion at Customs Office. See Newry customs bombing.
Patrick Hughes	22 August 1972	35	Catholic	Irish Republican Army	Newry, County Down.	Irish Republican Army	Died in premature bomb explosion at Customs Office. See Newry customs bombing.
Francis Quinn	22 August 1972	28	Catholic	Civilian	Newry, County Down.	Irish Republican Army	Died in premature bomb explosion at Customs Office. See Newry customs bombing.
Patrick Murphy	22 August 1972	45	Catholic	Civilian	Newry, County Down.	Irish Republican Army	Died in premature bomb explosion at Customs Office. See Newry customs bombing.
Craig Lawrence	22 August 1972	33	Protestant	Civilian	Newry, County Down.	Irish Republican Army	Died in premature bomb explosion at Customs Office. See Newry customs bombing.
Michael Gilleece	22 August 1972	32	Catholic	Civilian	Newry, County Down.	Irish Republican Army	Died in premature bomb explosion at Customs Office. See Newry customs bombing.
Joseph Fegan	22 August 1972	28	Catholic	Civilian	Newry, County Down.	Irish Republican Army	Died in premature bomb explosion at Customs Office. See Newry customs bombing.
John McCann	22 August 1972	60	Catholic	Civilian	Newry, County Down.	Irish Republican Army	Died in premature bomb explosion at Customs Office. See Newry customs bombing.
Alan Tingey	23 August 1972	25	Unknown	British Army	Kenard Avenue, Andersonstown, Belfast.	Irish Republican Army	Shot by sniper while on foot patrol.
Ian Caie	24 August 1972	19	Unknown	British Army	Moybane, near Crossmaglen, County Armagh.	Irish Republican Army	Killed in land mine attack on mobile patrol.
Arthur Whitelock	25 August 1972	24	Unknown	British Army	Moyola Drive, Shantallow, Derry.	Irish Republican Army	Shot by sniper while on foot patrol.
Alfred Johnston	25 August 1972	32	Protestant	Ulster Defence Regiment	Cherrymount, near Enniskillen, County Fermanagh.	Irish Republican Army	Killed by remote controlled bomb, hidden in abandoned car, detonated when Ulster Defence Regiment patrol approached.
James Eames	25 August 1972	33	Protestant	Ulster Defence Regiment	Cherrymount, near Enniskillen, County Fermanagh.	Irish Republican Army	Killed by remote controlled bomb, hidden in abandoned car, detonated when Ulster Defence Regiment patrol approached.
John Nulty	26 August 1972	26	Catholic	Civilian	Agnes Street, Shankill, Belfast.	Ulster Volunteer Force	Found shot.
Patrick Kelly	26 August 1972	26	Catholic	Civilian	Benwell Street, Lower Oldpark, Belfast.	Ulster Volunteer Force	Found shot.
James Carlin	26 August 1972	Unknown	Catholic	Irish Republican Army	Downpatrick, County Down.	Irish Republican Army	Died in premature bomb explosion at racecourse grandstand.
Martin Curran	26 August 1972	Unknown	Catholic	Irish Republican Army	Downpatrick, County Down.	Irish Republican Army	Died in premature bomb explosion at racecourse grandstand.
Thomas Boyd	27 August 1972	28	Protestant	Civilian	Carlisle Street, off Crumlin Road, Belfast.	Ulster Defence Association	Shot at his home.
Anthony Metcalfe	27 August 1972	28	Unknown	British Army	Creggan, Derry.	Irish Republican Army	Shot by sniper while in Creggan Heights British Army base.
Ian Morrell	28 August 1972	29	Unknown	British Army	Beechmount Avenue, Belfast.	Irish Republican Army	Shot by sniper while on foot patrol.
Ronald Rowe	28 August 1972	21	Unknown	British Army	Ardoyne Avenue, Ardoyne, Belfast.	British Army	Shot in error, from British Army observation post, while on foot patrol.
William Trotter	28 August 1972	57	Protestant	Civilian	Drumralla, near Newtownbutler, County Fermanagh.	Irish Republican Army	Killed by booby trap bomb while walking across field on his farm.
David Griffiths	30 August 1972	20	Unknown	British Army	Clonard Street, Lower Falls, Belfast.	Irish Republican Army	Shot by sniper while on foot patrol.
Roy Christopher	30 August 1972	20	Unknown	British Army	Cupar Street, Belfast.	Irish Republican Army	Died 12 days after being injured in bomb attack on foot patrol.
Patrick Devenney	31 August 1972	27	Catholic	Civilian	Rugby Road, Belfast.	Ulster Defence Association	Body found shot in sack.
Eamon McMahon	31 August 1972	19	Catholic	Civilian	Portadown, County Armagh.	non-specific Loyalist group	Found tied up and beaten to death in River Bann.
Robert Cutting	03 September 1972	18	Unknown	British Army	Junction of Lepper Street and Stratheden Street, New Lodge, Belfast.	British Army	Shot, in error, by other British Army member while on foot patrol.
Victor Smyth	05 September 1972	54	Protestant	Ulster Defence Regiment	Bridge Street, Portadown, County Armagh.	not known	Off duty. Killed in car bomb explosion outside McGurk's Bar. Driving past at the time of the explosion.
Samuel Boyde	06 September 1972	20	Protestant	Civilian	La Salle Drive, Falls, Belfast.	Irish Republican Army	Found shot in entry off drive.
William Moore	06 September 1972	20	Protestant	Civilian	Castlereagh Street, Belfast.	not known	Shot from passing car while walking along street.
Bridget Breen	06 September 1972	33	Catholic	Civilian	Cedar Avenue, off Antrim Road, Belfast.	non-specific Loyalist group	Killed by bomb thrown into the home of James O'Kane, Republican Labour Party Councillor.
Robert McKinnie	07 September 1972	49	Protestant	Civilian	Matchett Street, Shankill, Belfast.	British Army	Shot during nearby street disturbances, while driving his car along street.
Robert Johnston	07 September 1972	50	Protestant	Civilian	Berlin Street, Shankill, Belfast.	British Army	Shot during street disturbances.
Douglas Richmond	10 September 1972	21	Unknown	British Army	Sanaghanroe, near Dungannon, County Tyrone.	Irish Republican Army	Killed in land mine attack on Armoured Personnel Carrier.
Duncan McPhee	10 September 1972	21	Unknown	British Army	Sanaghanroe, near Dungannon, County Tyrone.	Irish Republican Army	Killed in land mine attack on Armoured Personnel Carrier.
William McIntyre	10 September 1972	23	Unknown	British Army	Sanaghanroe, near Dungannon, County Tyrone.	Irish Republican Army	Killed in land mine attack on Armoured Personnel Carrier.
Patrick Doyle	13 September 1972	19	Catholic	Civilian	Springfield Road, Belfast.	non-specific Loyalist group	Son of publican. Shot in Divis Castle Bar.
Robert Warnock	13 September 1972	18	Protestant	Ulster Defence Association	Glen Road, Castlereagh, Belfast.	Royal Ulster Constabulary	Shot by off duty Royal Ulster Constabulary member during attempted armed robbery at Hillfoot Bar.
Andrew McKibben	14 September 1972	28	Protestant	Civilian	Cliftonville Road, Belfast.	Ulster Volunteer Force	Killed in car bomb explosion outside Imperial Hotel. Driving past at the time of the explosion.
Martha Smilie	14 September 1972	91	Protestant	Civilian	Cliftonville Road, Belfast.	Ulster Volunteer Force	Killed in car bomb explosion outside Imperial Hotel.
Anne Murray	14 September 1972	53	Catholic	Civilian	Cliftonville Road, Belfast.	Ulster Volunteer Force	Injured in car bomb explosion outside Imperial Hotel. She died 16 September 1972.
John Davis	15 September 1972	22	Unknown	British Army	Meenan Square, Bogside, Derry.	Irish Republican Army	Died three weeks after being shot while on foot patrol.
Sinclair Johnston	16 September 1972	27	Protestant	Ulster Volunteer Force	St John's Place, Larne, County Antrim.	British Army	Shot during street disturbances.
Michael Quigley	17 September 1972	19	Catholic	Irish Republican Army	Central Drive, Creggan, Derry.	British Army	Shot during street disturbances.
Edmund Woolsey	18 September 1972	32	Catholic	Civilian	Glassdrumman, near Crossmaglen, County Armagh.	not known	Killed by booby trap bomb attached to a friend's stolen car, which exploded when he attempted to open the door.
John Van Beck	18 September 1972	26	Unknown	British Army	Lecky Road, Derry.	Irish Republican Army	Died one day after being shot while on foot patrol.
Francis Bell	20 September 1972	18	Unknown	British Army	Springhill Avenue, Ballymurphy, Belfast.	Irish Republican Army	Died three days after being shot while on foot patrol.
Joseph McComiskey	20 September 1972	18	Catholic	Irish Republican Army Youth Section	Flax Street, Ardoyne, Belfast.	British Army	Shot during gun battle.
Thomas Bullock	21 September 1972	53	Protestant	Ulster Defence Regiment	Aghalane, near Derrylin, County Fermanagh.	Irish Republican Army	Off duty. Shot together with his wife at their home.
Emily Bullock	21 September 1972	50	Protestant	Civilian	Aghalane, near Derrylin, County Fermanagh.	Irish Republican Army	Shot together with her husband, an Ulster Defence Regiment member, at their home.
William Matthews	22 September 1972	47	Catholic	Civilian	Off Glencairn Road, Glencairn, Belfast.	non-specific Loyalist group	Found stabbed to death, beside Ballygomartin River.
Stewart Gardiner	22 September 1972	23	Unknown	British Army	Drummuckavall, near Crossmaglen, County Armagh.	Irish Republican Army	Shot by sniper while on foot patrol.
John Barry	25 September 1972	22	Unknown	British Army	Junction of Cyprus Street and McDonnell Street, Lower Falls, Belfast.	Irish Republican Army	Died two days after being shot while on mobile patrol.
Paul McCartan	26 September 1972	52	Catholic	Civilian	Park Avenue, Strandtown, Belfast.	Ulster Defence Association	Found shot near his home.
Daniel McErlane	27 September 1972	46	Catholic	Civilian	Upper Library Street, Belfast.	non-specific Loyalist group	Died one day after being injured during car bomb attack on social club.
Daniel Rooney	27 September 1972	19	Catholic	Civilian	St James Crescent, Falls, Belfast.	British Army	Shot by undercover British Army member, from passing car while walking along street.
George Lockhart	27 September 1972	24	Unknown	British Army	Lecky Road, Bogside, Derry.	Irish Republican Army	Died four days after being shot by sniper while on foot patrol.
Alexander Greer	27 September 1972	54	Protestant	Civilian	Corner of Ligoniel Road and Mill Avenue, Ligoniel, Belfast.	Irish Republican Army	Shot while standing with friend.
James Boyle	27 September 1972	17	Catholic	Civilian	Off Springfield Road, Belfast.	non-specific Loyalist group	Found shot by Flush River, Elswick Street.
Edward Pavis	28 September 1972	32	Protestant	Civilian	Glenvarlock Street, Belfast.	Ulster Volunteer Force	Shot at his home.
Thomas Paisley	29 September 1972	49	Protestant	Civilian	Straid Road, Ballynure, near Ballyclare, County Antrim.	Ulster Volunteer Force	Milkman, shot during armed robbery at farmhouse.
James Quigley	29 September 1972	18	Catholic	Irish Republican Army	Albert Street, Lower Falls, Belfast.	British Army	Shot during attempted sniper attack on foot patrol.
Ian Burt	29 September 1972	18	Unknown	British Army	Albert Street, Lower Falls, Belfast.	Irish Republican Army	Shot by sniper while on foot patrol.
Patricia McKay	30 September 1972	20	Catholic	Official Irish Republican Army	Ross Street, Lower Falls, Belfast.	British Army	Shot during attempted attack on foot patrol.
Francis Lane	30 September 1972	23	Catholic	Civilian	Glencairn Road, Glencairn, Belfast.	non-specific Loyalist group	Found shot on waste ground.
John Kelly	30 September 1972	43	Catholic	Civilian	Tullagh Park, Andersonstown, Belfast.	British Army	Died three days after being shot during altercation between local people and British Army patrol.
Thomas Rudman	30 September 1972	20	Unknown	British Army	Ladbrooke Drive, Ardoyne, Belfast.	Irish Republican Army	Shot by sniper while on foot patrol.
Patrick McKee	30 September 1972	25	Catholic	Civilian	Smithfield, Belfast.	Ulster Volunteer Force	Killed in car bomb attack outside Conlon's Bar.
James Gillen	30 September 1972	21	Catholic	Civilian	Smithfield, Belfast.	Ulster Volunteer Force	Injured in car bomb attack outside Conlon's Bar. He died 17 October 1972.
Joseph Lynskey	30 September 1972	45	Catholic	Irish Republican Army	Beechmount area, Belfast	Irish Republican Army	Went missing August/September 1972. Presumed killed. Body never found.
Michael Hayes	01 October 1972	27	Catholic	Civilian	Edlingham Street, New Lodge, Belfast.	British Army	Shot while walking along street.
Edward Stuart	02 October 1972	20	Protestant	British Army	Juniper Park, Twinbrook, Belfast.	Irish Republican Army	From Northern Ireland. Undercover British Army member. Shot while driving laundry van.
Edward Bonner	02 October 1972	50	Catholic	Civilian	Iveagh Street, Falls, Belfast.	Irish Republican Army	Shot while inside Grosvenor Homing Pigeon's Club, Alleged informer.
Seamus Wright	02 October 1972	25	Catholic	Irish Republican Army	Coghalstown, near Navan, County Meath.	Irish Republican Army	Abducted from his home, Bombay Street, Falls, Belfast. His remains eventually found, on general information supplied by the IRA, buried in farmland, formerly bogland on 25 June 2015. Alleged informer.
Kevin McKee	02 October 1972	17	Catholic	Irish Republican Army	Coghalstown, near Navan, County Meath	Irish Republican Army	Abducted somewhere in Belfast. His remains eventually found, on general information supplied by the IRA, buried in farmland, formerly bogland on 25 June 2015. Alleged informer.
Geoffrey Hamilton	03 October 1972	23	Protestant	Civilian	Murdoch Street, off Grosvenor Road, Belfast	Irish Republican Army	Abducted while taking photographs following bomb explosion, Distillery Street, Belfast. Found shot on 4 October 1972.
James McCartan	04 October 1972	21	Catholic	Civilian	off Mersey Street, Belfast.	Ulster Defence Association	Found shot on waste ground, beside Connswater River.
Patrick Connolly	04 October 1972	23	Catholic	Civilian	Portadown, County Armagh.	Ulster Volunteer Force	Killed by hand grenade thrown into his home, Deramore Drive.
John Magee	05 October 1972	54	Protestant	Civilian	Dublin Road, Belfast.	Ulster Defence Association	Killed in bomb attack on Capitol Bar.
Daniel McAreavey	06 October 1972	21	Catholic	Irish Republican Army	Osman Street, Lower Falls, Belfast.	British Army	Shot during bomb attack on British Army observation post.
Olive McConnell	07 October 1972	23	Catholic	Civilian	Leeson Street, Lower Falls, Belfast.	Ulster Volunteer Force	Killed in car bomb attack, outside Long Bar.
Alexander Moorehead	07 October 1972	16	Protestant	Civilian	Newtownstewart, County Tyrone.	Ulster Defence Regiment	Shot while walking along Mourne Park.
John Ruddy	10 October 1972	50	Catholic	Ulster Defence Regiment	Dromalane Park, Newry, County Down	Irish Republican Army	Off duty. Shot outside his home.
Patrick Maguire	10 October 1972	24	Catholic	Irish Republican Army	Balkan Street, Lower Falls, Belfast.	Irish Republican Army	Died in premature bomb explosion in house.
Joseph McKinney	10 October 1972	17	Catholic	Irish Republican Army	Balkan Street, Lower Falls, Belfast.	Irish Republican Army	Died in premature bomb explosion in house.
John Donaghy	10 October 1972	19	Catholic	Irish Republican Army	Balkan Street, Lower Falls, Belfast.	Irish Republican Army	Died in premature bomb explosion in house.
Robert Nicholl	13 October 1972	22	Protestant	Royal Ulster Constabulary	Castle Street, Belfast.	British Army	Off duty. Shot while driving car.
Terence Maguire	14 October 1972	23	Catholic	Civilian	Clandeboye Street, Belfast.	non-specific Loyalist group	Found shot in entry.
Leo John Duffy	14 October 1972	45	Catholic	Civilian	Tate's Avenue, off Lisburn Road, Belfast.	non-specific Loyalist group	Shot at his workplace, Northern Wine Company.
Thomas Marron	14 October 1972	59	Catholic	Civilian	Tate's Avenue, off Lisburn Road, Belfast.	non-specific Loyalist group	Shot at his workplace, Northern Wine Company.
James Doherty	15 October 1972	6	Catholic	Civilian	Norglen Crescent, Turf Lodge, Belfast.	not known	Died one week after being shot while in the garden at his home.
Patrick Mullan	16 October 1972	34	Catholic	Official Irish Republican Army	Outside St Patrick's Hall, Coagh, County Tyrone.	British Army	Shot while travelling in car at British Army Vehicle Check Point.
Hugh Herron	16 October 1972	38	Catholic	Official Irish Republican Army	Outside St Patrick's Hall, Coagh, County Tyrone.	British Army	Shot while travelling in car at British Army Vehicle Check Point.
John Clarke	16 October 1972	26	Protestant	Ulster Defence Association	Hornby Street, off Newtownards Road, Belfast.	British Army	Knocked down by British Army Armoured Personnel Carrier, which mounted pavement during street disturbances.
William Warnock	16 October 1972	15	Protestant	Ulster Defence Association	Newtownards Road, Belfast.	British Army	Knocked down by British Army Armoured Personnel Carrier, while at barricade during street disturbances.
Eleanor Cooke	17 October 1972	32	Protestant	Civilian	Bracken Street, Shankill, Belfast.	British Army	Shot during street disturbances near to her home.
John Todd	17 October 1972	23	Protestant	Ulster Defence Association	Wilton Street, Shankill, Belfast.	British Army	Off duty Ulster Defence Regiment member. Shot during street disturbances.
Anthony David	18 October 1972	27	Unknown	British Army	Falls Road, Belfast.	Irish Republican Army	Died four weeks after being shot while on mobile patrol.
Gordon Harron	21 October 1972	32	Protestant	Royal Ulster Constabulary	Shore Road, by Mount Vernon, Belfast.	Ulster Defence Association	Died four days after being shot after stopping car.
John Bell	22 October 1972	21	Protestant	Ulster Defence Regiment	Derrydoon, near Newtownbutler, County Fermanagh.	Irish Republican Army	Off duty. Shot at his farm.
Michael Naan	23 October 1972	31	Catholic	Civilian	Aghnahinch, near Newtownbutler, County Fermanagh.	British Army	Stabbed to death at his farm. His body found on 24 October 1972.
Andrew Murray	23 October 1972	24	Catholic	Civilian	Aghnahinch, near Newtownbutler, County Fermanagh.	British Army	Stabbed to death at his workplace, Michael Naan's farm. His body found on 24 October 1972.
Robert Mason	24 October 1972	19	Unknown	British Army	Naples Street, off Grosvenor Road, Belfast.	Irish Republican Army	Shot by sniper while on foot patrol.
John Morrell	24 October 1972	32	Unknown	British Army	Drumarg, Armagh.	Irish Republican Army	Died ten days after being injured when detonated booby trap bomb while searching house.
Thomas McKay	28 October 1972	29	Unknown	British Army	Bishop Street, Derry.	Irish Republican Army	Shot by sniper while on mobile patrol.
Michael Turner	29 October 1972	16	Catholic	Civilian	Cliftonville Road, Belfast.	Ulster Volunteer Force	Shot from passing car while walking along street.
James Kerr	31 October 1972	17	Catholic	Civilian	Lisburn Road, Belfast.	Red Hand Commando	Shot at his workplace, garage.
Richard Sinclair	31 October 1972	19	Unknown	British Army	Antrim Road, New Lodge, Belfast.	Irish Republican Army	Shot by sniper while on foot patrol.
Paula Strong	31 October 1972	6	Catholic	Civilian	Corner of Garmoyle Street and Ship Street, Belfast.	Ulster Defence Association	Killed when car bomb exploded outside Benny's Bar.
Clare Hughes	31 October 1972	4	Catholic	Civilian	Corner of Garmoyle Street and Ship Street, Belfast.	Ulster Defence Association	Killed when car bomb exploded outside Benny's Bar.
Irwin Long	08 November 1972	29	Protestant	Ulster Defence Regiment	Lake Street, Lurgan, County Armagh.	Irish Republican Army	Off duty. Shot while driving his car along street.
Ronald Kitchen	10 November 1972	20	Unknown	British Army	Oldpark Road, Belfast.	Irish Republican Army	Shot while at British Army Vehicle Check Point.
Gerard Kelly	11 November 1972	58	Catholic	Civilian	Crumlin Road, Belfast.	Red Hand Commando	Shot at his newsagent's shop.
Stanislaus Carberry	13 November 1972	34	Catholic	Irish Republican Army	La Salle Drive, Falls, Belfast.	British Army	Shot while travelling in car along street.
Joseph McCrystal	14 November 1972	28	Catholic	Civilian	Arthur Road, Greencastle, Belfast.	non-specific Loyalist group	Died two days after being shot near his home.
Stanley Evans	14 November 1972	19	Unknown	British Army	Stanhope Street, Unity Flats, Belfast.	Irish Republican Army	Shot while guarding British Army members searching homes.
George Doherty	15 November 1972	32	Catholic	Civilian	Sintonville Avenue, Strandtown, Belfast.	non-specific Loyalist group	Shot at his home.
Joseph Calvin	16 November 1972	42	Protestant	Royal Ulster Constabulary	Quay Lane, Enniskillen, County Fermanagh.	Irish Republican Army	Off duty. Killed by booby trap bomb attached to his car, in car park.
William Clarke	20 November 1972	41	Protestant	Civilian	Forthriver Road, Glencairn, Belfast.	Ulster Defence Association	Taxi driver. Died three weeks after being shot by passenger. Assumed to be a Catholic.
William Watson	20 November 1972	28	Unknown	British Army	Cullyhanna, County Armagh.	Irish Republican Army	Killed by booby trap bomb in derelict house.
James Strothers	20 November 1972	31	Unknown	British Army	Cullyhanna, County Armagh.	Irish Republican Army	Killed by booby trap bomb in derelict house.
Joseph McIlroy	21 November 1972	30	Catholic	Civilian	Sandhill Drive, Bloomfield, Belfast.	Ulster Volunteer Force	Shot at his home.
Samuel Porter	22 November 1972	30	Protestant	Ulster Defence Regiment	Ballinahone, near Maghera, County Londonderry.	Irish Republican Army	Off duty. Shot outside his home.
Liam Shivers	22 November 1972	48	Catholic	Civilian	Brough, near Castledawson, County Londonderry.	Ulster Defence Association	Shot outside his home.
Rory Gormley	27 November 1972	14	Catholic	Civilian	Junction of Downing Street and Ariel Street, Shankill, Belfast.	Ulster Volunteer Force	Shot while travelling in car.
Robert Keys	28 November 1972	55	Protestant	Royal Ulster Constabulary	County Fermanagh.	Irish Republican Army	Killed in rocket attack on Belleek Royal Ulster Constabulary / British Army base.
John Brady	28 November 1972	21	Catholic	Irish Republican Army	Meenan Drive, Bogside, Derry.	Irish Republican Army	Died in premature bomb explosion in house.
James Carr	28 November 1972	19	Catholic	Irish Republican Army	Meenan Drive, Bogside, Derry.	Irish Republican Army	Died in premature bomb explosion in house.
Paul Jackson	28 November 1972	21	Unknown	British Army	Strand Road, Derry.	Irish Republican Army	Member of bomb disposal team. Killed while sitting in Armoured Personnel Carrier monitoring bomb which exploded.
Gerard Gearon	30 November 1972	22	Catholic	Civilian	Crumlin Road, Belfast.	non-specific Loyalist group	Shot by other passenger while travelling in taxi, outside Mater Hospital.
Joseph McAuley	01 December 1972	47	Catholic	Civilian	Finvoy, near Ballymoney, County Antrim.	Ulster Defence Association	Died ten days after being shot while walking along laneway near his home.
George Bradshaw	01 December 1972	30	Unknown	Civilian	Sackville Place, off O'Connell Street, Dublin.	Ulster Volunteer Force	Killed in car bomb explosion. Inadequate warning given.
Thomas Duffy	01 December 1972	23	Unknown	Civilian	Sackville Place, off O'Connell Street, Dublin.	Ulster Volunteer Force	Killed in car bomb explosion. Inadequate warning given.
Patrick Benstead	02 December 1972	23	Catholic	Civilian	Off Crossley Street, Belfast.	non-specific Loyalist group	Found shot in entry.
Sandra Meli	02 December 1972	26	Protestant	Civilian	Off Beersbridge Road, Belfast.	non-specific Loyalist group	Shot at her home, Flora Street. Her Catholic husband was the intended target.
Samuel Hamilton	03 December 1972	50	Protestant	Civilian	Comber Street, Short Strand, Belfast.	non-specific Republican group	Found shot.
Bernard Fox	04 December 1972	16	Catholic	Irish Republican Army Youth Section	Junction of Brompton Park and Crumlin Road, Ardoyne, Belfast.	British Army	Shot while standing at the junction.
William Bell	05 December 1972	30	Protestant	Civilian	Corner of Berwick Road and Glenbryn Park, Ardoyne, Belfast.	British Army	Shot while repairing roof of house.
Roy Hills	05 December 1972	28	Unknown	British Army	Lurgan, County Armagh.	Official Irish Republican Army	Killed by booby trap bomb attached to rocket launcher, abandoned near Kitchen Hill British Army base.
William Bogle	05 December 1972	27	Protestant	Ulster Defence Regiment	Main Street, Killeter, near Castlederg, County Tyrone.	Irish Republican Army	Off duty. Shot outside post office.
Samuel White	06 December 1972	32	Protestant	Civilian	Lisbon Street, Short Strand, Belfast.	non-specific Republican group	Found shot.
Ernest Elliott	07 December 1972	28	Protestant	Ulster Defence Association	Off Donegall Avenue, Village, Belfast.	Ulster Defence Association	Found shot in back of abandoned car. Internal Ulster Defence Association dispute.
Jean McConville	07 December 1972	37	Catholic	Civilian	Shelling Hill beach, near Carlingford, Co. Louth	Irish Republican Army	From Northern Ireland. Abducted from her home, St. Judes Walk, Divis, Belfast. Her remains eventually recovered, on general instructions from the IRA, buried on 27 August 2003.
John Joesbury	08 December 1972	18	Unknown	British Army	Whiterock Road, Ballymurphy, Belfast.	Irish Republican Army	Died two days after being shot while on mobile patrol.
Joseph Kelly	08 December 1972	47	Catholic	Civilian	Castlereagh Street, Belfast.	non-specific Loyalist group	Shot while travelling on bus.
Stewart Middlemass	10 December 1972	33	Unknown	British Army	Turf Lodge, Belfast.	Irish Republican Army	Killed by booby trap bomb attached to rocket launcher in Fort Monagh British Army base.
James Ward	11 December 1972	53	Catholic	Civilian	North Queen Street, Belfast.	British Army	Shot as he walked past Royal Ulster Constabulary / British Army base.
James Nixon	13 December 1972	49	Protestant	Royal Ulster Constabulary	Antrim Road, Belfast.	Irish Republican Army	Off duty. Shot outside Chester Park Hotel.
Kathleen Dolan	14 December 1972	19	Catholic	Civilian	Killeter, near Castlederg, County Tyrone.	Ulster Volunteer Force	Killed by car bomb outside Dolan's Bar.
James Reynolds	15 December 1972	16	Catholic	Civilian	Dandy Street, Greencastle, Belfast.	non-specific Loyalist group	Shot from passing motorcycle while standing on street corner.
George Chambers	15 December 1972	44	Protestant	Royal Ulster Constabulary	Kilwilkie Gardens, Kilwilkie, Lurgan, County Armagh.	Official Irish Republican Army	Shot shortly after leaving house.
Frederick Greeves	15 December 1972	40	Protestant	Ulster Defence Regiment	Moy Road, Armagh.	Official Irish Republican Army	Off duty. Shot as he left his workplace, creamery.
Louis Leonard	16 December 1972	26	Catholic	Irish Republican Army	Derrylin, County Fermanagh.	non-specific Loyalist group	Found shot at his butcher's shop.
Joseph Blaney	16 December 1972	38	Catholic	Civilian	York Road, Belfast.	non-specific Loyalist group	Shot at his off-licence shop.
William Johnston	18 December 1972	48	Protestant	Civilian Political Activist	Knockbane, near Middletown, County Armagh.	Irish Republican Army	Ulster Unionist Party Councillor and member of Police Authority. Abducted from a house, Drumarg estate, Armagh. Found shot a short time later.
David McAleese	20 December 1972	37	Catholic	Civilian	Junction of Young's Row and Newtownards Road, Belfast.	non-specific Loyalist group	Shot while walking to work.
George Hamilton	20 December 1972	28	Protestant	Ulster Defence Regiment	Kildoag, Claudy, County Londonderry.	Irish Republican Army	Off duty. Shot at his workplace, building site.
Alphonsus McGeown	20 December 1972	19	Catholic	Civilian	Clonmore, near Charlemont, County Armagh.	Ulster Volunteer Force	Shot from passing car while walking along laneway.
Michael McGinley	20 December 1972	37	Catholic	Civilian	Strabane Old Road, Waterside, Derry.	non-specific Loyalist group	Shot during gun attack on Top of the Hill Bar.
Charles McCafferty	20 December 1972	31	Catholic	Civilian	Strabane Old Road, Waterside, Derry.	non-specific Loyalist group	Shot during gun attack on Top of the Hill Bar.
Bernard Kelly	20 December 1972	26	Catholic	Civilian	Strabane Old Road, Waterside, Derry.	non-specific Loyalist group	Shot during gun attack on Top of the Hill Bar.
Francis McCarron	20 December 1972	58	Catholic	Civilian	Strabane Old Road, Waterside, Derry.	non-specific Loyalist group	Shot during gun attack on Top of the Hill Bar.
Charles Moore	20 December 1972	31	Protestant	Civilian	Strabane Old Road, Waterside, Derry.	non-specific Loyalist group	Shot during gun attack on Top of the Hill Bar.
James Mullan	21 December 1972	25	Catholic	Civilian	Clandeboye Road, Bangor, County Down.	non-specific Loyalist group	Shot from passing car while walking along road.
Colin Harker	24 December 1972	23	Unknown	British Army	Lecky Road, Derry.	Irish Republican Army	Died three months after being shot by sniper, while on foot patrol. He was injured on 14th September 1972.
Eugene Devlin	27 December 1972	22	Catholic	Irish Republican Army	Townsend Street, Strabane, County Tyrone.	British Army	Shot during attempted sniper attack on British Army patrol.
Geraldine O'Reilly	28 December 1972	15	Unknown	Civilian	Main Street, Belturbet, County Cavan.	non-specific Loyalist group	Killed when car bomb exploded.
Patrick Stanley	28 December 1972	16	Unknown	Civilian	Main Street, Belturbet, County Cavan.	non-specific Loyalist group	Killed when car bomb exploded.
James McDaid	29 December 1972	30	Catholic	Irish Republican Army	Ballyarnet, Derry.	British Army	Shot while walking across field.
Hugh Martin	30 December 1972	56	Catholic	Civilian	Lichfield Avenue, Bloomfield, Belfast.	Ulster Volunteer Force	Found shot in his car shortly after leaving work.

== 1974 ==
Name	Date of death	Age	Religious affiliation	Status	Location of injury	Perpetrator	Notes
John Patrick Cunningham	15 June 1974	27	Catholic	Civilian	Benburb	British Army	Mentally disabled man who was killed while running in a field.
Jimmy Hasty	11 October 1974	38	Catholic	Civilian	Brougham Street, Belfast	Ulster Volunteer Force	Former Dundalk F.C. footballer. Killing claimed by 'Ulster Protestant Action Group'

== 1979 ==
Name	Date of death	Age	Religious affiliation	Status	Location of injury	Perpetrator	Notes
William James Carson	25 April 1979	32	Catholic	Belfast Brigade (IRA)	North Belfast	Ulster Volunteer Force	
