= 1971 Newry killings =

Killing of three Catholic civilians by undercover British soldiers in 1971

- Part of the Troubles
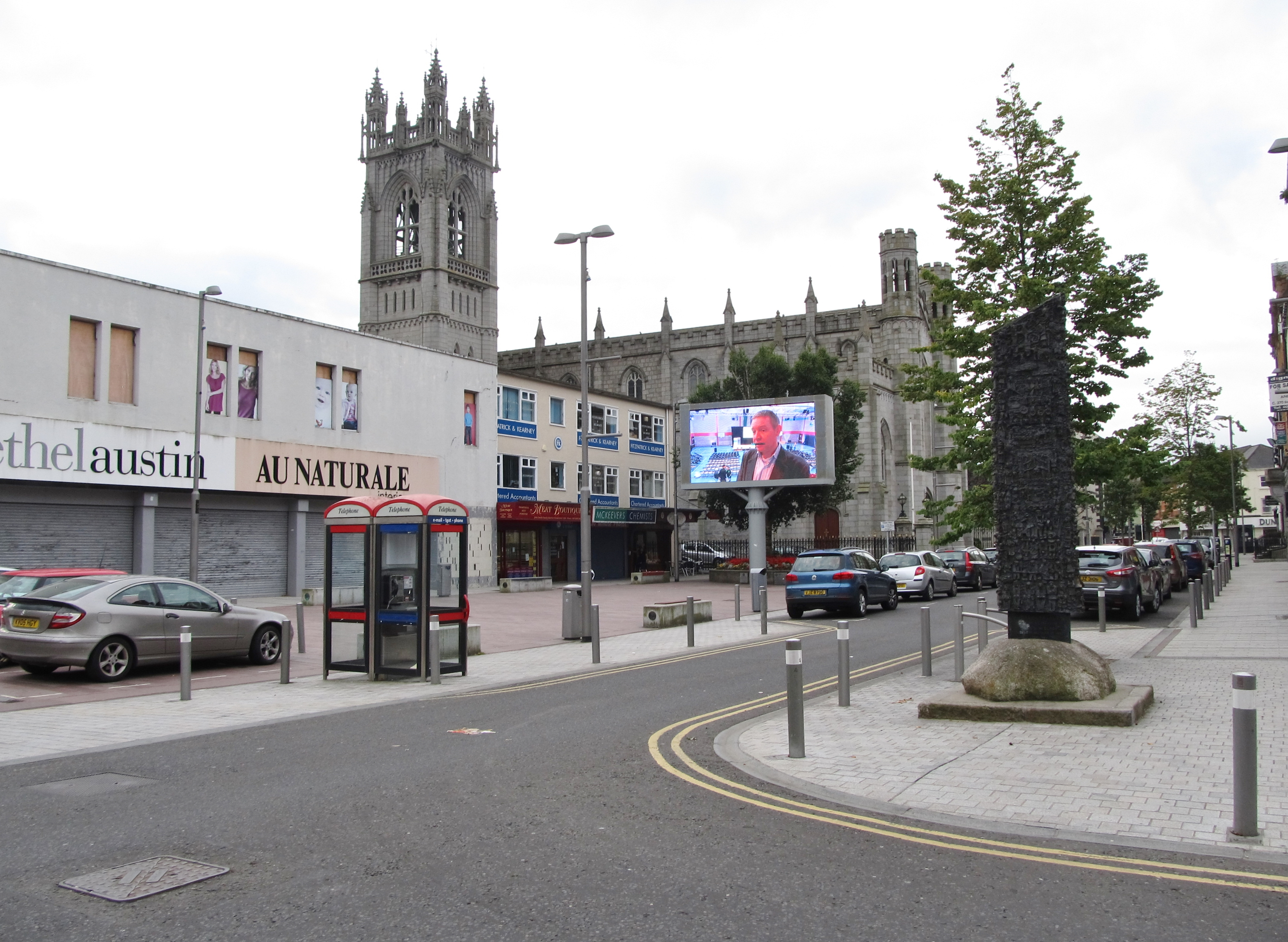
- A photograph of the former Woolworths shop taken in March 2016
- Date: 23 October 1971
- Location: Newry, Northern Ireland
- Participants: Sean Ruddy (19); Robert Anderson (25); Thomas McLoughlin (27); 4 undercover British Army soldiers
- Outcome: Riots by the Catholic community
- Deaths: 3 (Ruddy, Anderson, McLoughlin)

The 1971 Newry killings was an incident during the Troubles in Newry, Northern Ireland where undercover British Army soldiers shot and killed three Catholic civilians in disputed circumstances on 23 October 1971. Four Royal Green Jackets soldiers were stationed in the town's Woolworths department store after the army had received a tip-off that the Provincial Bank across the street would be the target of a bank robbery by the Provisional Irish Republican Army.

Three men, Sean Ruddy, Robert Anderson and Thomas McLoughlin, were spotted approaching the bank and after becoming involved in an altercation with two men depositing money were shouted at to stop by the soldiers. All three began running away and were subsequently shot and killed by the soldiers. After the killings, the soldiers involved were tried in a civil proceeding; a jury found the soldiers not guilty of murder. After news of the killings became public, angered mobs rioted in Newry for several days until security forces managed to bring the situation back under control.

== Background ==
The Troubles, also known as the "Northern Ireland conflict", were an ethno-nationalist conflict in Northern Ireland that lasted about 30 years from the late 1960s to 1998; it resulted from tensions between Irish Catholics and Ulster Protestants in the region. After the Battle of the Bogside and the 1969 Northern Ireland riots, the British Army was deployed to the region as part of Operation Banner, an effort by the government of the United Kingdom to provide military aid to the civil authorities.

Initially, Irish Catholics in Northern Ireland viewed the British Army as a welcome alternative to the predominantly-Protestant Royal Ulster Constabulary (RUC). However, tensions soon increased as the army was viewed by the Catholic community as favouring Protestants, a fact which was exploited by Irish republican paramilitary organisations, most prominently the Provisional Irish Republican Army (PIRA) in their campaign to reunite Northern Ireland with the Republic of Ireland. By the early 1970s, tension and violence in Northern Ireland had rapidly increased, particularly in the wake of the ongoing political instability of the Stormont government.

== Killings ==
On the night of 23 October 1971, four Royal Green Jackets soldiers stationed in the town of Newry were deployed undercover on the roof of the town's Woolworths department store after the army had received a tip-off that the Provincial Bank across the street would be the target of a bank robbery by the IRA. At some point during the night, the soldiers observed three men, Sean Ruddy, Robert Anderson and Thomas McLoughlin approaching the bank. When they were near the bank, the three men became involved in a scuffle with two other men who were attempting to deposit money. One soldier, witnessing the events unfolding nearby, called for the three men to stop by shouting "Halt!" Upon hearing the message, all three immediately ran away; the soldier responded by shouting "Halt. I am ready to fire!" When the three men refused to stop, all four soldiers opened fire on them, killing Ruddy, Anderson and McLoughlin. Upon recovering their bodies, it was discovered that all three were unarmed.

== Aftermath ==
After the killings, the soldiers involved were tried in a civil proceeding. The jury for the proceeding found the soldiers not guilty of murder, finding that they had opened fire after suspecting that the three men were planting an improvised explosive device at the bank; the jury also found that the Ruddy, Anderson and McLoughlin were attempting to rob the two men outside of the bank. After news of the killings became public, angered mobs rioted in Newry for several days, throwing stones and molotov cocktails at the British security forces. During the funerals for the three men, most businesses in the town temporarily closed themselves out of respect (the exceptions were the Provincial Bank and the Royal Mail post office in Newry, both of which had their windows broken by rioters throwing stones at them). The security forces eventually managed to bring the riots under control after using CS gas and baton rounds against rioters.

== See also ==
- Bloody Sunday
- Falls Curfew
- List of massacres in Ireland
- Operation Demetrius
- Springhill massacre
