= The Troubles in Limavady =

Incidents in Limavady, Northern Ireland during the Troubles

Four people were killed in violence relating to the Northern Ireland Troubles in the town of Limavady, County Londonderry. All were Protestants, and all were killed by the Provisional Irish Republican Army (IRA). One was a prison officer and one was a Royal Ulster Constabulary (RUC) officer. The other two victims were civilians killed by a van bomb explosion outside the Limavady RUC base on 28 March 1972. They were driving past at the time of the attack.

The Catholic Church of Christ the King in Limavady was also bombed by loyalist paramilitaries in October 1981 as it was nearing completion.

In the early hours of 13 June 1986 the IRA detonated a huge bomb in Castle Park, a predominantly Protestant residential area of Limavady. Police were still evacuating homes when the bomb went off but only minor injuries were incurred though about thirty homes were damaged, some of them very significantly.
