= Red Lion Pub bombing =

1971 IRA attack in Belfast, Northern Ireland

- Part of the Troubles
- Location: 54°35′07.8″N 5°55′22.7″W; Ormeau Road, Belfast, Northern Ireland
- Date: 2 November 1971; 21:00 (GMT)
- Attack type: Time bombing
- Deaths: 3 civilians
- Injuries: 26
- Perpetrator: Provisional IRA

The Red Lion Pub bombing was a bomb attack on 2 November 1971 in Belfast, Northern Ireland. Planted by the Provisional IRA, it exploded in the Red Lion pub on Ormeau Road, killing three people and injuring about 30 others. The IRA members had given customers less than ten seconds to flee the building. Police said the target was the neighbouring Royal Ulster Constabulary (RUC) station.

== Background ==
Since the introduction of internment in August 1971, the Troubles in Northern Ireland intensified. Along with IRA attacks against the British Army and Royal Ulster Constabulary (RUC), attacks on pubs by republicans and loyalists began. On 20 September, a bomb exploded outside the Bluebell Bar in the Protestant Sandy Row area of Belfast, injuring 27 people; none of them seriously. On 29 September, an IRA bomb exploded in the Four Step Inn on the Protestant Shankill area of Belfast, killing two men. The Ulster Volunteer Force (UVF) retaliated a week later, bombing a pub on the Catholic Falls Road in Belfast. The UVF wanted to kill Catholics but instead killed Winifred Maxwell (45), a Protestant woman.

== Bombing ==
At around 4:25 pm on Tuesday 2 November, three IRA members entered the Red Lion pub, beside Ballynafeigh RUC station on the Ormeau Road in Belfast. Two of them planted a bomb while the other guarded them with a gun. Before leaving the pub, one of the IRA men shouted "you have ten seconds to get out". Some customers ran out the front door, but others who tried to leave by the side door found it had been locked for security reasons. The bomb exploded only about six seconds after the warning. The walls collapsed and the roof fell in; around thirty people were injured and many of them were buried under rubble. Three Protestant civilians were killed: John Cochrane (67), Mary Gemmell (55), and William Jordan (31), who died two days later.

At the same time, another bomb exploded in a shop on the other side of the RUC station. The Belfast Telegraph reported: "There is no doubt in the minds of police that the police station was the target [...] both bombs were placed against the inner walls of the pub and the shop in an attempt to bring down the station on top of the RUC men inside". An RUC spokesman added: "even if they did miscalculate the fuse of the bomb, ten seconds was certainly not nearly enough to allow everyone to get out".

== Aftermath ==
A week later the Provisional IRA was again blamed for bombing another Loyalist public house, this time the "Toddle Inn" public house on York Street, no injuries were suffered in that bombing.

== See also ==
- Chronology of Provisional Irish Republican Army actions (1970–1979)
