= Newry customs bombing =

1972 IRA bombing in Northern Ireland

- Part of the Troubles
- Newry customs office
- Location: Newry County Armagh, Northern Ireland
- Date: 22 August 1972
- Target: Newry customs office
- Attack type: Time bomb
- Deaths: 9 (6 civilians 3 IRA volunteers)
- Injuries: 20
- Perpetrator: Provisional IRA

On 22 August 1972 a bomb planted by the Provisional Irish Republican Army, an Irish republican paramilitary group, detonated prematurely at a customs office in Newry. Three IRA members killed six civilians and themselves in the explosion. The event was one of the bloodiest of 1972, the deadliest year of the Troubles.

== Background ==
Since 1971, the Provisional IRA had been waging a campaign to end British rule in Northern Ireland. Gun and bomb attacks became daily occurrences in the province as the campaign continued. In January 1972, soldiers from the Parachute Regiment shot dead 14 civil rights protesters in Derry, in an event later known as Bloody Sunday. The attack enraged the nationalist community and as a result support for the IRA surged. In the following months the ferocity of the conflict, and as a result number of casualties, rose dramatically.

Military installations and civilian businesses were targeted frequently. Civilians often fell victim to the IRA's attacks. This most prominently occurred on Bloody Friday, when at least 20 bombs planted by the IRA exploded in quick succession in Belfast. As a result of the bombs, 9 people were killed and another 130 injured.

Newry, a mainly nationalist town near the Irish border, had a lot of IRA supporters. Attacks had already taken place in the town, leading to seven people - three civilians, two police officers, one British soldier and one IRA volunteer - being killed.

== Attack ==
Three IRA members walked into the office with a bomb. It exploded prematurely, killing all of them, two lorry drivers and four customs staff.

== See also ==
- List of terrorist incidents, 1972
